= Katame-no-kata =

Judo form/technique

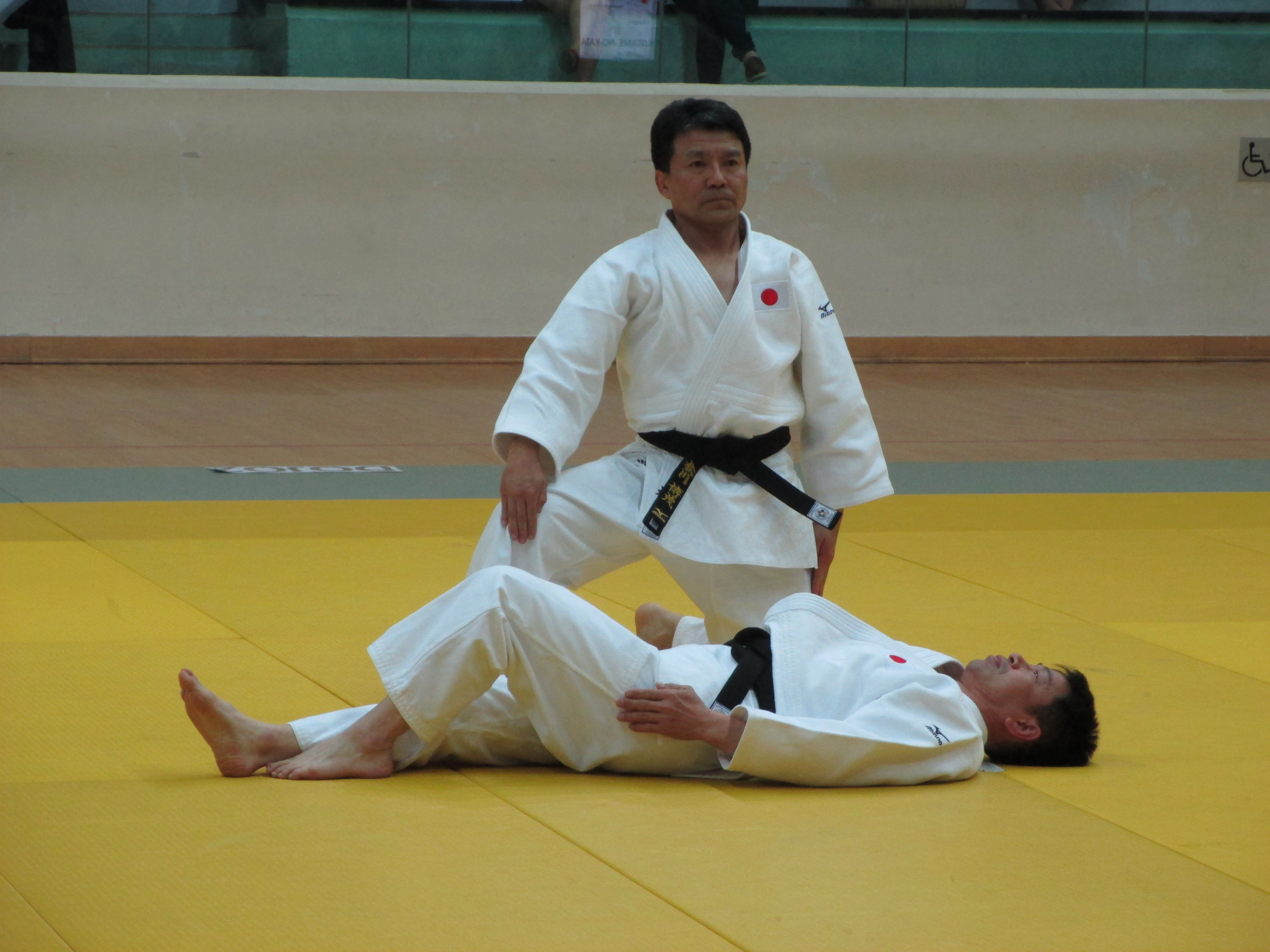
- Classification: Judo Kata
- Sub classification: Randori-no-kata
- Kodokan: Yes

Technique name
- Rōmaji: Katame-no-kata
- Japanese: 固の形
- English: Forms of grappling

Katame no Kata (固の形, Forms of grappling) is one of the two Randori-no-kata (乱取りの形, Free practice forms) of Kodokan Judo. It is intended as an illustration of the various concepts of katame-waza (固技, grappling techniques) that exist in judo, and is used both as a training method and as a demonstration of understanding.

== History ==
The katame-no-kata was developed by Jigoro Kano as a method of illustrating principles of grappling to allow students to more effectively apply them in randori. Initially, the kata consisted of ten techniques. These were subsequently appended, bringing the number to fifteen.

The Katame no Kata was developed at the Kodokan between 1884 and 1887 following the development of the Nage no Kata. It is composed of three groups of grappling techniques each with five representative techniques. Your goal is to acquire the methods of controlling your opponent in your practice of Katame No Kata.

== Description ==
The katame-no-kata consists of fifteen techniques, grouped in three categories:

- Osaekomi-waza (抑込技, holding or pinning techniques)
- Shime-waza (絞技, strangulation techniques)
- Kansetsu-waza (関節技, Joint techniques (locks))

=== Osae-komi-waza ===
The five holding techniques demonstrated in Katame no Kata are:

- Kesa-gatame (in the Kuzure-kesa-gatame variant) (袈裟固)
- Kata-gatame (肩固)
- Kami-shiho-gatame (上四方固)
- Yoko-shiho-gatame (横四方固)
- Kuzure-kami-shiho-gatame (崩上四方固)

=== Shime waza ===
The five chokes demonstrated are:

- Kata-juji-jime (片十字絞)
- Hadaka-jime (裸絞)
- Okuri-eri-jime (送襟絞)
- Kata ha jime (片羽絞)
- Gyaku-juji-jime (逆十字絞)

=== Kansetsu waza ===
The five joint locks demonstrated are:

- Ude-garami (腕緘)
- Ude-hishigi-juji-gatame (腕挫十字固)
- Ude-hishigi-ude-gatame (腕挫腕固)
- Ude-hishigi-hiza-gatame (腕挫膝固)
- Ashi-garami (足緘)

== Videos of katame-no-kata ==
- Katame-no-kata demonstration from Poland, filmed in 2006. No narration, but there is background music. Participants are identified as "Niedomagala and Nowakowski."
