= List of Brazilian jiu-jitsu techniques =

Brazilian jiu-jitsu (BJJ) does not have an established canon (formalized set of techniques), with significant regional variation seen in both application and naming. Brazilian jiu-jitsu initially consisted of judo katame-waza (newaza) techniques, but has since evolved to encompass a far greater variety by absorbing techniques from amateur wrestling, catch wrestling, sambo, and Japanese jujitsu (not to be confused with Brazilian jiu-jitsu). Due to its status as an eclectic martial art, much controversy surrounds the renaming of techniques derived from other martial arts. Many of these martial arts including Brazilian jiu-jitsu's parent art of judo, was itself a collection of adopted techniques from other older forms of martial arts before developing unique techniques. In recent times however, technical innovations exclusive to Brazilian jiu-jitsu (e.g. worm guard, inverted guard) have been developed, setting it apart from its predecessors.

Unlike its direct predecessor judo, which categorizes techniques on the basis of mechanism, Brazilian jiu-jitsu techniques are frequently eponyms, which leads to confusion among practitioners. Examples include:

- Sode guruma jime ("sleeve wheel constriction", referencing its mechanism) is a judo choke made famous by Ezequiel Paraguassu and as such was renamed the "Ezequiel choke"
- Gyaku Ude Garami ("reverse elbow entanglement", referencing its mechanism) is a Judo armlock that received notoriety for its use by Masahiko Kimura and has hence been renamed the 'Kimura"

Below is a partial list of techniques categorized by type.

== Takedowns ==
- Basic Things (setups / movements / controls):

Movement & Positioning Fundamentals

1. Stance
2. Footwork / Motion
3. Head Positioning
4. Level Change
5. Penetration Step
6. Shooting

Hand Fighting & Tie-Ups

1. Hand Fighting
2. Wrist Control
3. Collar Tie
4. Inside Tie
5. Pummeling
6. Underhook
7. Overhook (Whizzer)
8. Russian Tie (2-on-1)

Setups & Positional Attacks

1. Arm Drag
2. Slide By
3. Snapdown
4. Front Headlock

Defensive Fundamentals

1. Sprawl
2. Downblock
3. Crossface
4. Breakfalls (Ukemi)
- Wrestling takedowns / BJJ Takedowns
  - Double leg
  - Single leg
  - Body Lock Takedown (Clinch Lift or Trip)
  - Trips
    - Inside Trip (Uchi Mata-style or clinch-based)
    - Outside Trip (Osoto Gari-style)
    - Trip from Back Body Lock (Mat Return-style)
  - Duck Under to Back Take (Clinch Entry to Mat Return)
  - Hip Toss (Harai Goshi / Head-and-Arm Throw)
  - Ankle picks
  - Knee tap
  - High crotch Lift / Tree Top Single
  - Fireman's carry
  - Suplex
  - Hip throw
  - Judo Sweeps Ashi-waza + Foot Sweep (e.g., Khabib-style trip from cage)
- Judo Takedowns\Throws Nage waza
  - Te-waza (手技): hand throwing techniques
  - Koshi-waza (腰技): hip throwing techniques
  - Ashi-waza (足技): foot throwing techniques

== Escapes ==
1. Closed Guard (Full Guard)

  1. Knee-in-Tailbone Break
  2. Standing Guard Break
  3. Double Forearm/Wedge Break
  4. Hip Control + Elbow Wedge
  5. Can Opener (caution: often illegal in sport BJJ)

2. Half Guard (Top Position)

  1. Crossface + Knee Slice Pass
  2. Backstep Pass
  3. Twist Pass (Weave Arm Through Legs)
  4. Tripod Smash Pass
  5. Knee Pry + Hip Kickout

3. Mount Escapes

  1. Bridge and Roll (Upa Escape)
  2. Elbow Escape (Shrimp Escape)
  3. Knee-to-Elbow + Hip Escape Combo
  4. Foot Drag Escape
  5. Trap and Bridge vs High Mount
  6. Elbow Wedge to Knee Insert
  7. Technical Bridge to Turtle
  8. Knee Push + Elbow Pull
  9. Ghost Escape (Frame and Backdoor Slide Out)
  10. Kipping Escape

4. Open Guard

  1. Torreando (Bullfighter) Pass
  2. Leg Drag Entry
  3. X-Pass (Step-Over Guard Break)
  4. Tripod Push + Backstep
  5. Shin Pin Pass

5. Bottom Escapes

  1. Most important 3–5 (to be defined)

6. De La Riva Guard

  1. Backstep Escape
  2. Leg Pummel (Shin Kill)
  3. Knee Cut Through Hook
  4. Pant Grip + Push Knee Down

7. Spider Guard

  1. Posture Up + Elbow Peel
  2. C-Scoop Arm Escape
  3. Leg Drag vs Lasso
  4. Pin a Leg + Torreando

8. Lasso Guard

  1. Strip Sleeve Grip + Backstep
  2. Knee Pin + Pullout
  3. Step Over Lasso + Smash Pass
  4. High-Step Backward to Unwind Hook

9. Butterfly Guard

  1. Float and Smash (Low Hips, Heavy Pressure)
  2. Cross-Body Smash Pass
  3. Step-Back & Leg Drag
  4. Body Lock Pass

10. X-Guard / Single-Leg X

   1. Kick Out Leg (Push Shin Off)
   2. Backstep + Knee Twist
   3. Sit into Hip Smash
   4. Push Foot Off Hip

== Submissions (Most Frequent in UFC – Sorted by Frequency) ==
1. Rear Naked Choke
2. Guillotine Choke
3. Armbar
4. Arm Triangle
5. Triangle Choke
6. D’Arce Choke
7. Kimura
8. Anaconda
9. Kneebar
10. Neck Crank
11. Heel Hook
12. Ankle Lock
13. Keylock
14. Von Flue Choke
15. Bulldog Choke
16. Forearm Choke
17. North-South Choke
18. Ezekiel Choke
19. Inverted Triangle
20. Flying Triangle
21. Twister
22. Calf Slicer
23. Omoplata
24. Peruvian Necktie
25. Schultz Front Headlock
26. Shoulder Choke
27. Toe Hold
28. Other

== Chokeholds ==
- Triangle choke
  - Front
  - Side
  - Back
- Rear naked choke (Mata Leão / Hadaka Jime)
- North south choke
- Anaconda choke
- D'arce choke
- Arm triangle choke
- Punch Choke
- Peruvian Necktie
- Japanese Necktie
- Von Flue Choke
- Head scissor
- Guillotine choke
- Sode guruma jime (Ezequiel choke)
- Cross Collar Choke
- Bow and Arrow Choke
- Clock Choke
- Gogoplata

== Joint locks ==
- Arm locks
  - Elbow lock
    - Armbar
    - Straight armlock
  - Arm crush
  - Bicep slicer
  - Shoulder locks
    - Americana (Ude garami)
      - Mir Lock
    - Kimura (Gyaku ude garami)
    - Omoplata
  - Wrist locks
- Leg locks
  - Straight ankle locks
  - Heel hooks
  - Toe holds
  - Kneebars
  - Electric chair (Crotch ripper)
- Spinal locks
  - Can opener (Fisherman's crank)
  - Twister (wrestler's guillotine)
  - Boston crab
  - Spine lock

== Sweeps ==
(not to be confused with foot sweeps which are standing techniques)

- Closed guard
  - Hip bump sweep
  - Scissor sweep
  - Flower sweep
  - Lumberjack sweep
  - Waiter/Muscle sweep
  - Balloon sweep (helicopter armbar)
  - 100% sweep
  - Omoplata sweep
- Half guard
  - Old school sweep
  - John Wayne sweep
  - Pendulum Sweep
  - Foot grab sweep
- Open guard
  - Butterfly (hook) sweep
  - De La Riva sweep
  - Heel grab sweep
  - Balloon sweep
  - Tripod sweep
  - Tomahawk sweep

== Positional grappling ==
- Guard
  - Closed guard (full guard)
  - Half guard
  - Open guard
    - Butterfly
    - Spider
    - Squid
    - Lasso
    - Lapel
    - De la riva / reverse de la riva
- Guard passing
- Side Control
- Kesa-gatame (scarf hold)
- Kuzure kesa gatame
- North south
- Knee-on-belly
- Mount
- Back mount
- Double jump
- Leg attacks
  - 50-50
  - Ashi garami (single leg X)
  - Ushiro ashi garami
  - Leg Knot/Game Over position
  - Saddle/Honey Hole/411/Inside Sankaku
  - Russian cowboy
  - Russian leg lasso

== See also ==
- Gracie Jiu-Jitsu
- List of judo techniques
