= Yoko gake =

Judo technique

Yoko Gake
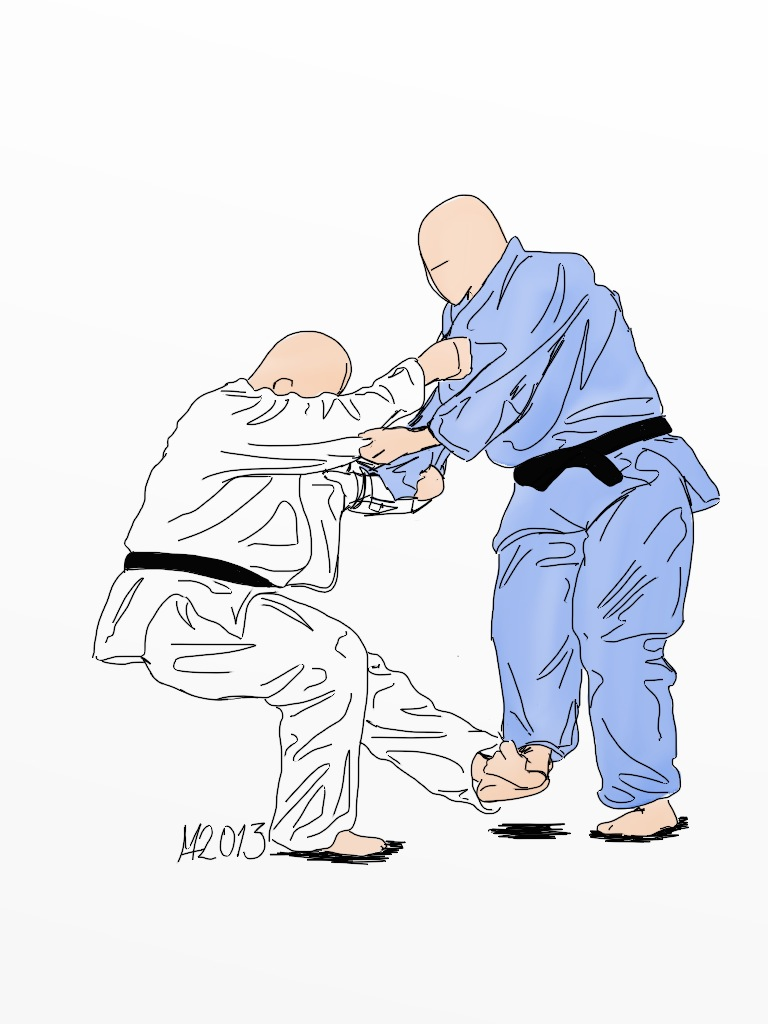
- Pen and ink Yoko-gake illustration
- Classification: Nage-waza
- Sub classification: Sutemi-waza
- Targets: Leg
- Kodokan: Yes

Technique name
- Rōmaji: Yoko-gake
- Japanese: 横掛
- English: Side hook
- Korean: 모로 걸기

Yoko gake (横掛) is one of the original forty throws of judo as developed by Jigoro Kano. It belongs to the fifth group, Gokyo, of the traditional throwing list, Gokyo (no waza), of Kodokan Judo. It is also part of the current 67 throws of Kodokan Judo. It is classified as a side sacrifice technique, Yoko-sutemi. Considered one of the techniques most dangerous for the Uke, its use in competition is infrequent; contributing to the risk is that Uke does not have sufficient space to dissipate the impact of the fall adequately. Another contributing factor is the necessity for Uke to compensate in order to achieve proper rotation in executing the breakfall; if the Uke does not succeed in meeting these criteria, the force of the impact can be severe, even to the point of possible spinal injury. For these reasons, the technique is generally reserved for expert judoka.

== Technique description ==
Ideal conditions for Yoko-gake include; a slight imbalance toward the front, simultaneous, coordinated action with Uke’s advancing foot. Tori initiates the throw by stepping to the same side as Uke’s advance, and rotating 90 degrees to a perpendicular position with Uke. To complete the throw Tori must lift the advanced leg, hooking and sweeping it with their own, in order to disrupt Uke’s balance, while simultaneously dropping themselves to the ground, consequently throwing Uke in the process.

== Similar techniques ==
Depending on the execution of Yoko-gake, it can be viewed as a sacrifice variation on any of the following trip throws:

- Kosoto gake
- Harai tsurikomi ashi
- De ashi harai
- Okuriashi harai
