= Ude hishigi waki gatame =

Judo technique

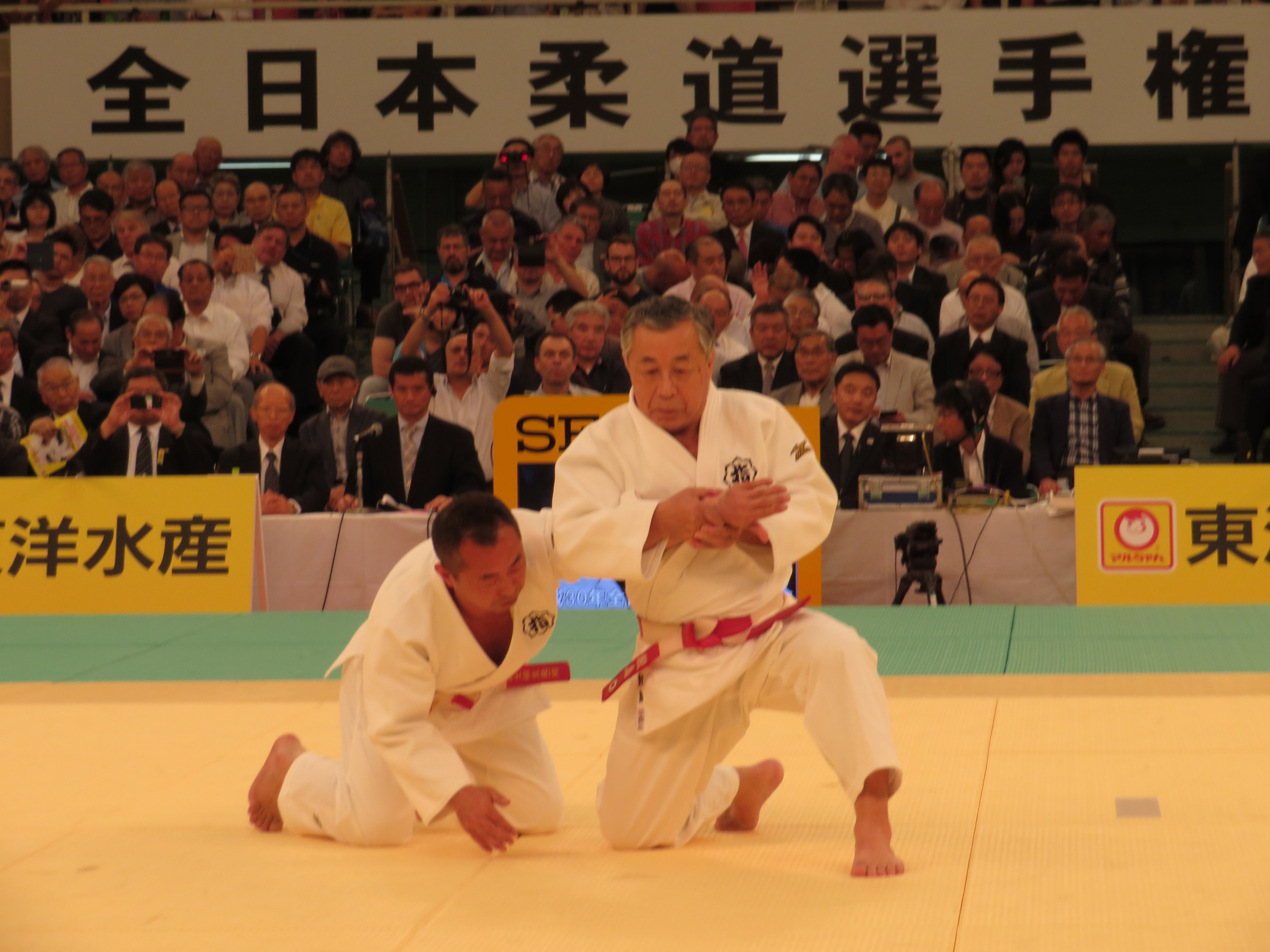
- Shinken-shobu-no-kata(Kime-no-kata)
- Classification: Katame-waza
- Sub classification: Kansetsu-waza
- Targets: Arm
- Kodokan: Yes

Technique name
- Rōmaji: Ude-hishigi-waki-gatame
- Japanese: 腕挫腋固
- English: Armpit arm-entanglement

Ude-Hishigi-Waki-Gatame (Japanese: 腕挫腋固) is an armlock and one of the official 29 grappling techniques of Kodokan Judo. It is one of the nine joint techniques of the Kansetsu-waza list, one of the three grappling lists in Judo's Katame-waza enumerating 29 grappling techniques. Falling directly to the mat while applying or attempting to apply the Waki gatame in competition is listed as an hansoku make (反則負け; literally "foul-play loss") by the International Judo Federation.

It is known as Fujiwara armbar in professional wrestling and occasionally in mixed martial arts.

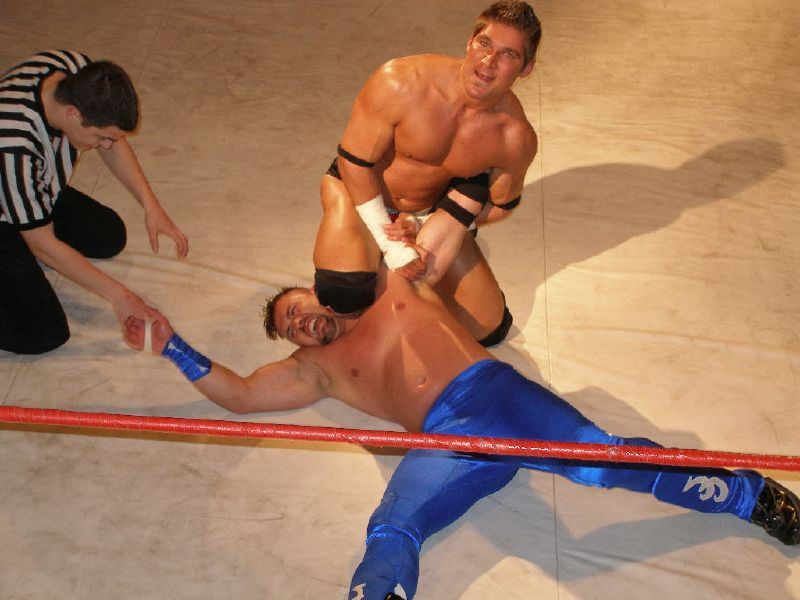
Wrestler Antonio Thomas applying a Kan'nuki gatame.

Kan'nuki gatame on standing position

== Technique description ==
This armlock is executed with Uke on their stomach, while tori has uke's arm trapped with the elbow beneath tori's armpit. Tori lifts uke's hand, causing hyperextension of the elbow joint in a similar manner to Ude-Hishigi-Juji-Gatame.

=== Variants ===
- Kan'nuki gatame (閂固) (Single overhook)
  - Inside shoulder armlock

== In mixed martial arts ==
The move was successfully used in mixed martial arts by Shinya Aoki in his debut on Shooto on January 25, 2005. He applied it on Keith Wisniewski during a clinch exchange, breaking his arm.

== Included systems ==
Systems:

- Kodokan Judo, List of Kodokan Judo techniques

Lists:

- The Canon Of Judo
- Judo technique
- The video, The Essence of Judo featuring Kyuzo Mifune
  - Tai gatame ude kujiki (1st pattern, 2nd pattern) (体固腕挫 その一,その二)

== Similar techniques, variants, and aliases ==
=== IJF official names ===
- Ude-hishigi-waki-gatame (腕挫腋固)
- U.H. waki-gatame
- Waki-gatame (腋固)
- WAK

=== Alias ===
- Armpit Armlock
- Body armlock (Ude-hishigi-tai-gatame)
- Fujiwara armbar
- Tai gatame ude kujiki

=== Similar techniques ===
- Ude-Hishigi-Kata-Osae-Tai-Gatame and variant Ude-Hishigi-Tai-Gatame are described in The Canon Of Judo.
- Kata osae tai gatame ude kujiki

Kata osae tai gatame ude kujiki is a joint hold demonstrated in The Essence Of Judo featuring Kyuzo Mifune. This is included in Ude hishigi hara gatame.
