= Ude hishigi sankaku gatame =

Judo technique

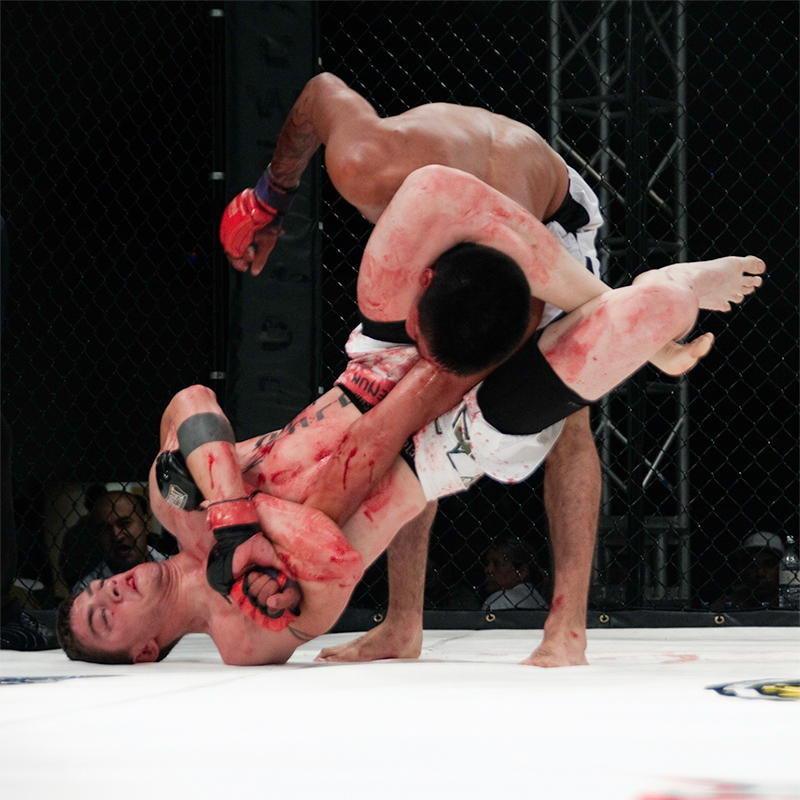
- Classification: Katame-waza
- Sub classification: Kansetsu-waza
- Targets: Arm
- Kodokan: Yes

Technique name
- Rōmaji: Ude-Hishigi-Sankaku-Gatame
- Japanese: 腕挫三角固
- English: triangular arm lock

Ude-Hishigi-Sankaku-Gatame (腕挫三角固), also referred to as Ao muke gata ude hishigi (背中方腕挫) in the Canon Of Judo, is one of the official 29 grappling techniques of Kodokan Judo. It is one of the nine joint techniques of the Kansetsu-waza list, one of the three grappling lists in Judo's Katame-waza, enumerating 29 grappling techniques, and is also demonstrated by Kyuzo Mifune in the video The Essence of Judo.

== Technique description ==
Sankaku is translated as "triangle," Ude-Hishigi as arm break, with gatame roughly translated as control. The triangle is formed by the legs of Tori that cross behind the head of Uke. The form created by the crossed legs resembles a triangle, hence the name. Sankaku-waza is a term that includes several control techniques (levers, chokes and fixed assets) that are characterized by this particular method of maintaining control with the legs.

== Escapes ==
=== Kesa-gata-sankaku-gatame-ude-hishigi ===
Scarf hold triangle armlock defense method

== Included Systems ==
Systems:

- Kodokan Judo, List of Kodokan Judo techniques

Lists:

- The Canon Of Judo
- Judo technique
- The video, The Essence of Judo featuring Kyuzo Mifune
  - Ude gatame ude kujiki (3rd pattern)(腕固腕挫 その三)
  - Sankaku-Gatame-Ude-Kujiki (1st pattern, 2nd pattern)(三角固腕挫 その一、三角固腕挫 その二)

== Similar Techniques, Variants, and Aliases ==
Variants

- Ao-Muke-Gata-Ude-Hishigi

Ao-Muke-Gata-Ude-Hishigi is described in the Canon Of Judo.

- Omote sankaku gatame (表三角固)
- Yoko sankaku gatame (横三角固)
- Ushiro sankaku gatame (後三角固)
- Shime garami (絞緘)

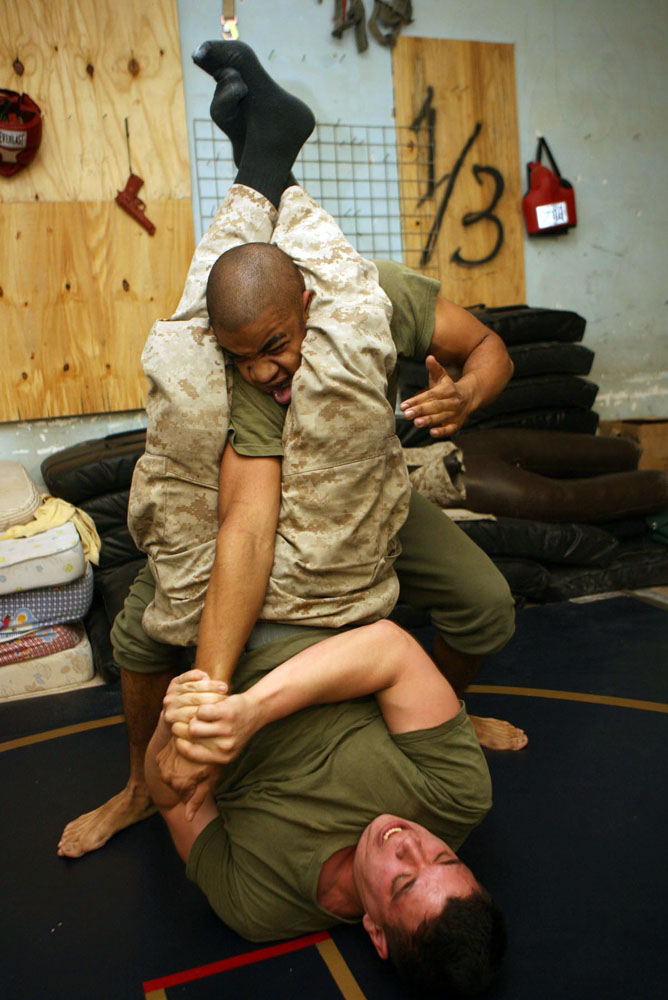
Shime garami

IJF Official Names:

- Ude-hishigi-sankaku-gatame(腕挫三角固)
- U.H. Sankaku gatame
- Sankaku gatame(三角固)
- SGT

Aliases

- Three corner armlock
