= Ude hishigi ude gatame =

Judo technique

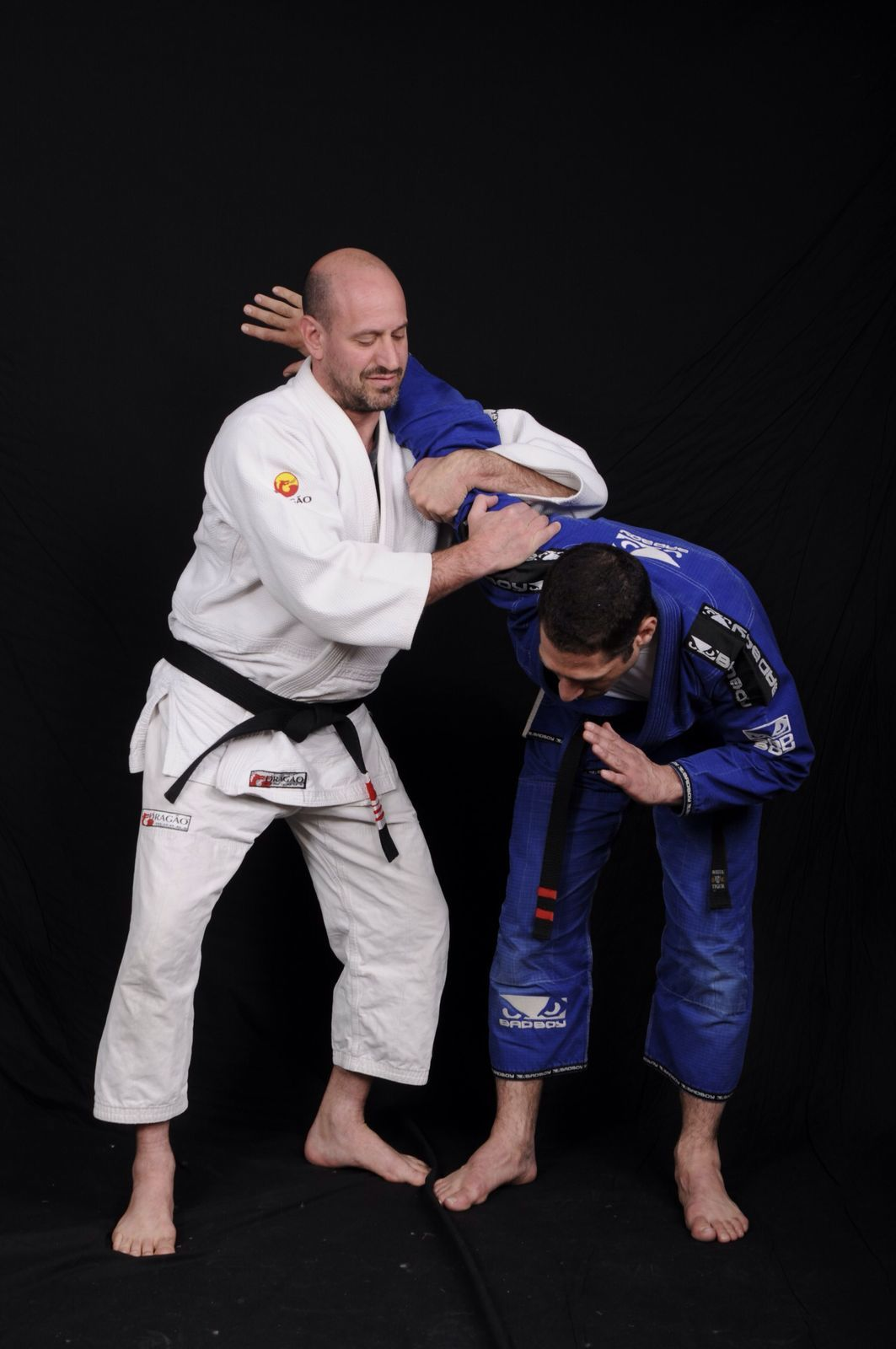
- Ude hishigi ude gatame from standing position
- Classification: Katame-waza
- Sub classification: Kansetsu-waza
- Targets: Arm
- Kodokan: Yes

Technique name
- Rōmaji: Ude-hishigi-ude-gatame
- Japanese: 腕挫腕固
- English: Arm lock

Ude-Hishigi-Ude-Gatame (腕挫腕固) is one of the official 29 grappling techniques of Kodokan Judo. It is one of the nine joint techniques of the Kansetsu-waza list, one of the three grappling lists in Judo's

Katame-waza enumerating 29 grappling techniques. All of Judo's competition legal joint techniques are arm locks.

== Technique Description ==
In the Ude-hishigi-ude-gatame arm lock, Tori executes an arm lock technique by hugging one of Uke’s arms against their chest. This is often in response to an escape attempt while trying to hold Uke down. Tori uses this technique specifically when Uke attempts to escape by extending an arm to grab Tori’s collar. Tori takes control of the extended arm with both hands and traps it to their chest. Tori draws Uke’s wrist to one side of the face and presses their knee against Uke’s side. With Uke then rolled onto one side with their arm trapped and their side locked, Tori employs the lever principle to hyperextend and bend Uke’s arm. While leaning back, Tori pulls Uke trapped arm toward his stomach to apply the elbow joint lock. Although it is possible to submit Uke if the technique is properly applied, there is a low percentage of finishing a match this manner. In actual competition, this technique is typically used as a transition to an Osaekomi-waza (pinning-hold technique).

== Included Systems ==
Systems:

- Kodokan Judo, Judo Lists

Lists:

- The Canon Of Judo
- Judo technique
- The video, The Essence of Judo featuring Kyuzo Mifune
  - Ude gatame ude kujiki(1st pattern)

== Similar Techniques, Variants, and Aliases ==
=== IJF Official Names ===
- Ude-hishigi-ude-gatame(腕挫腕固)
- U.H. ude gatame
- Ude gatame(腕固)
- UGA

=== Aliases ===
- Straight Arm Armlock
- Ude gatame ude kujiki

=== Variants ===
- Tachiai-Ude-Hishigi-Ude-Gatame is described in The Canon Of Judo. The throw and submission is quite similar to Danzan Ryu's (DZR) Tatsumaki Jime, which is found in DZR's Shime No Te list.
- Hiza-Gatame-Betsu-Gata too is described in The Canon Of Judo, this technique also bears resemblance to Ude-Hishigi-Juji-Gatame, except that uke's far arm is held and pressure is applied as in Ude-Hishigi-Ude-Gatame. Uke, originally on their back, are transferred sideways by the technique with their chest becoming placed against tori's shin and knee.

== Video ==
- "ASSMAA NIANG (MAR) - SALLY CONWAY (GBR) @ U70 BRONZE - GRAND PRIX BUDAPEST 2018". JudoInside. 2018-08-10.
  - Same match by two different cameras. "IJF Refereeing and Coaching Seminar 2019: Day 2" #124 40:40 "Judo(IJF)" channel YouTube. Retrieved 2019-04-08.

=== Variants ===
- "SALLY CONWAY (GBR) - MELISSA HELEINE (FRA) @ U70 - GRAND PRIX THE HAGUE 2018". JudoInside. 2018-11-16.
