= Kibisu gaeshi =

Judo technique

Kibisu-gaeshi
- Illustration of Kibisu-gaeshi Judo throw
- Classification: Nage-waza
- Sub classification: Te-waza
- Counter: Kani-basami
- Kodokan: Yes

Technique name
- Rōmaji: Kibisu-gaeshi
- Japanese: 踵返
- English: One-hand reversal
- Korean: 발목 잡아 메치기

Kibisu gaeshi (踵返) is a single leg takedown or "Ankle Pick" adopted later by the Kodokan into their Shinmeisho No Waza (newly accepted techniques) list. It is categorized as a hand technique, Te-waza.

== Technique ==
This technique involves tori reaching down toward the uke's legs and heel-picking the same side foot as the tori's chosen hand. When done as the uke is stepping backwards, this is hard to defend.

== Included Systems ==
Systems:

- Kodokan Judo, List of Kodokan Judo techniques

Lists:

- The Canon Of Judo
- Judo technique

== Similar Techniques, Variants, and Aliases ==
Aliases:

- Heel trip (reversal)
- Ankle Pick
