= Kuzure kesa gatame =

Judo technique

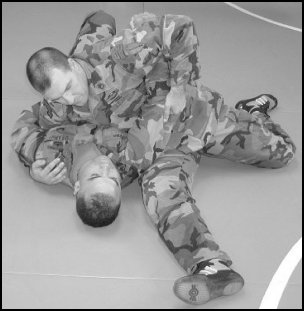
- Soldiers demonstrating Kuzure-kesa-gatame
- Classification: Katame-waza
- Sub classification: Osaekomi-waza
- Grip: Side control
- Counter: Sweep
- Kodokan: Yes

Technique name
- Rōmaji: Kuzure kesa gatame
- Japanese: 崩袈裟固
- English: Broken scarf hold

Kuzure-Kesa-Gatame (崩袈裟固) is one of the seven mat holds, Osaekomi-waza, of Kodokan Judo. In grappling terms, it is categorized as a side control hold.

== Technique description ==
Graphic from http://judoinfo.com/techdrw.htm

Kuzure-Kesa-Gatame occurs naturally with many Judo throws where tori wraps an arm around uke's waist, if tori follows the throw to the ground.

Exemplar Videos:

Demonstrated, Kuzure-Kesa-Gatame into Mune-Gatame, from http://www.sjjk.co.uk/videos.htm.

Instructional Video

== Escapes ==
- Kuzure-Kesa-Gatame Roll Over/Bridge Escape

== Submissions ==
- Kesa Ashi Gatame/Armbar with the legs
- Waki Gatame Arm Bar
- Calf and Forearm Choke
- Sankaku Jime

== Included systems ==
Systems:

- Kodokan Judo, Judo Lists

Lists:

- The Canon Of Judo
- Judo technique
- The video, The Essence of Judo featuring Kyuzo Mifune
  - Kuzure kesa gatame(崩袈裟固)
  - Ura gesa(裏袈裟)

== Similar techniques, variants, and aliases ==
IJF Official Names:

- Kuzure-kesa-gatame(崩袈裟固)
- KKE

English aliases:

- Broken scarf hold
- Modified scarf hold

Variants:

- Ura kesa gatame(Ura gesa)(裏袈裟固)
- Funakubo Gatame(舟久保固)

Similar:

- Kesa-Gatame
