= Ushiro-Kesa-Gatame =

Judo technique

Ushiro Kesa Gatame
- Classification: Katame-waza
- Sub classification: Osaekomi-waza

Technique name
- Rōmaji: Ushiro-Kesa-Gatame
- Japanese: 後袈裟固
- English: Reverse Scarf Hold

Ushiro-Kesa-Gatame is one of the variations of Kesa-Gatame, a mat hold, listed in The Canon Of Judo.

== Escapes ==
The main escape from this hold involves bridging and rolling your opponent over your shoulder. Although this hold is inherently vulnerable to this type of reversal, the individual performing the hold can mitigate this vulnerability by placing their trailing foot further back, making it substantially more difficult for their opponent to roll them.

== Included systems ==
Lists:

- The Canon Of Judo
- Judo technique

== Similar techniques, variants, and aliases ==
English aliases:

- Rear scarf hold

Similar:

- Kesa-Gatame
