= Kata te jime =

Judo technique

- Classification: Katame-waza
- Sub classification: Shime-waza
- Targets: Throat
- Kodokan: Yes

Technique name
- Rōmaji: Kata te jime
- Japanese: 片手絞
- English: Single hand choke

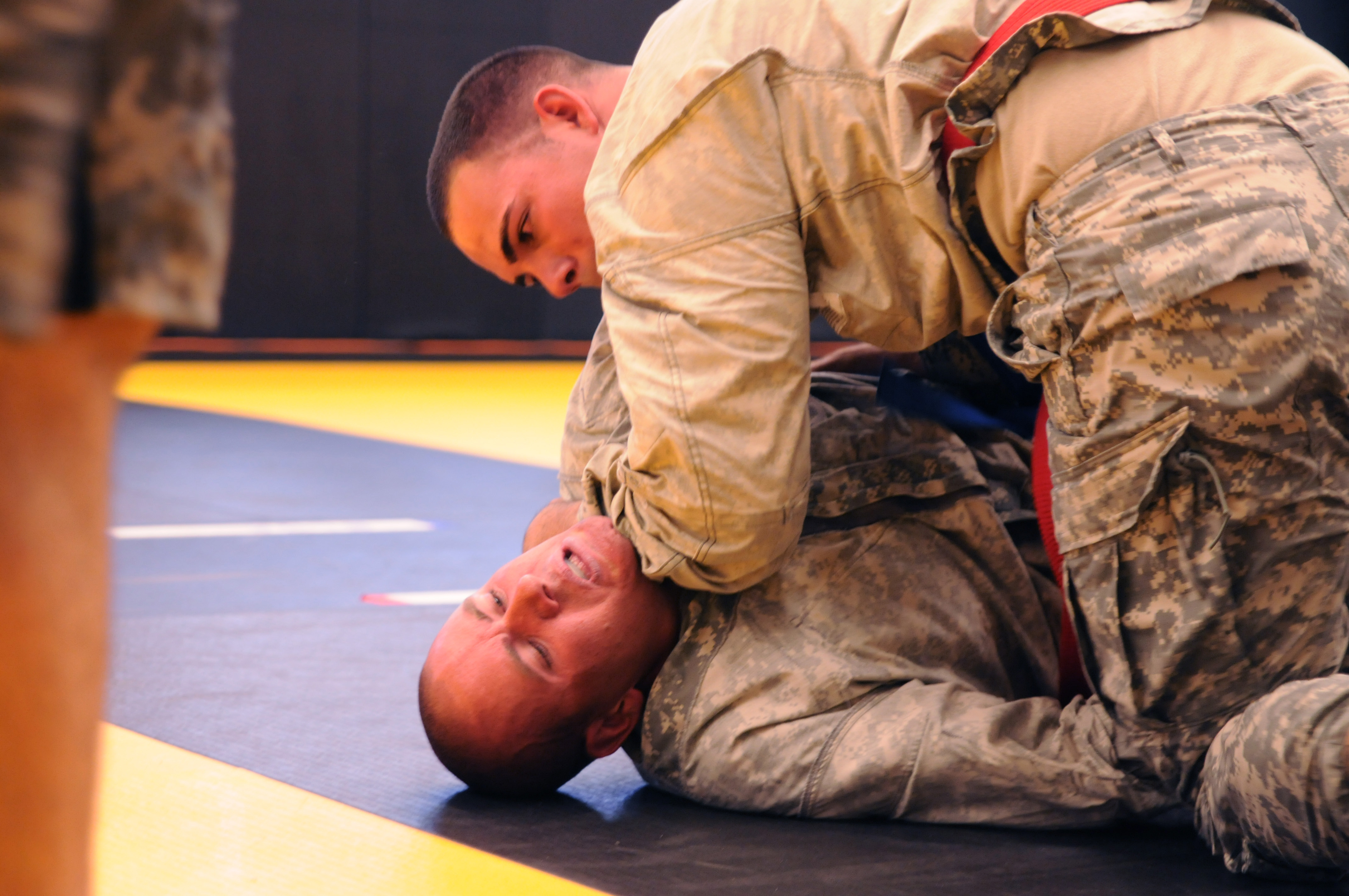
The 2012 Region VII Best Warrior Competition at Camp San Luis Obispo, Calif.

Kata-Te-Jime (片手絞) is a chokehold in judo. It is one of the twelve constriction techniques of Kodokan Judo in the Shime-waza list.

== Examples of contest this finished ==
=== Variants ===
- Itachi jime

- 2017 World Judo Championships – Mixed team Round 2 -73 kg

Win Miklós Ungvári (HUN) (3:46) Benjamin Axus (FRA) Loss IJF movie

- a variant grabbing back of uke's belt and using the back of tori's thigh

- Budapest Grand Prix 2019 Round 2 -52 kg

Loss Reka Pupp(Hungary) (2:44 katate jime(AJJF), okuri eri jime(IJF)) Chishima Maeda(Japan) Win IJF movie

== See also ==
- The Canon Of Judo
