= Ura kesa gatame =

Judo technique

Ura Kesa Gatame
- Classification: Katame-waza
- Sub classification: Osaekomi-waza

Technique name
- Rōmaji: Ura-Kesa-Gatame
- Japanese: 裹袈裟固
- English: Back scarf hold

Ura-Kesa-Gatame is one of the variations of Kuzure-Kesa-Gatame, a mat hold, listed in The Canon Of Judo. See Kesa-gatame "Similar techniques".

== Included systems ==
Lists:

- The Canon Of Judo
- Judo technique

== Similar techniques, variants, and aliases ==
English aliases:

- Back scarf hold

Similar:

- Kuzure-Kesa-Gatame
