= Scissors kick =

Scissors kick may refer to:

- Scissor kick (martial arts), a move in martial arts and wrestling
- Bicycle kick, a move in association football
- Scissor kick (finning)
