= Ashi-Hishigi =

Judo technique

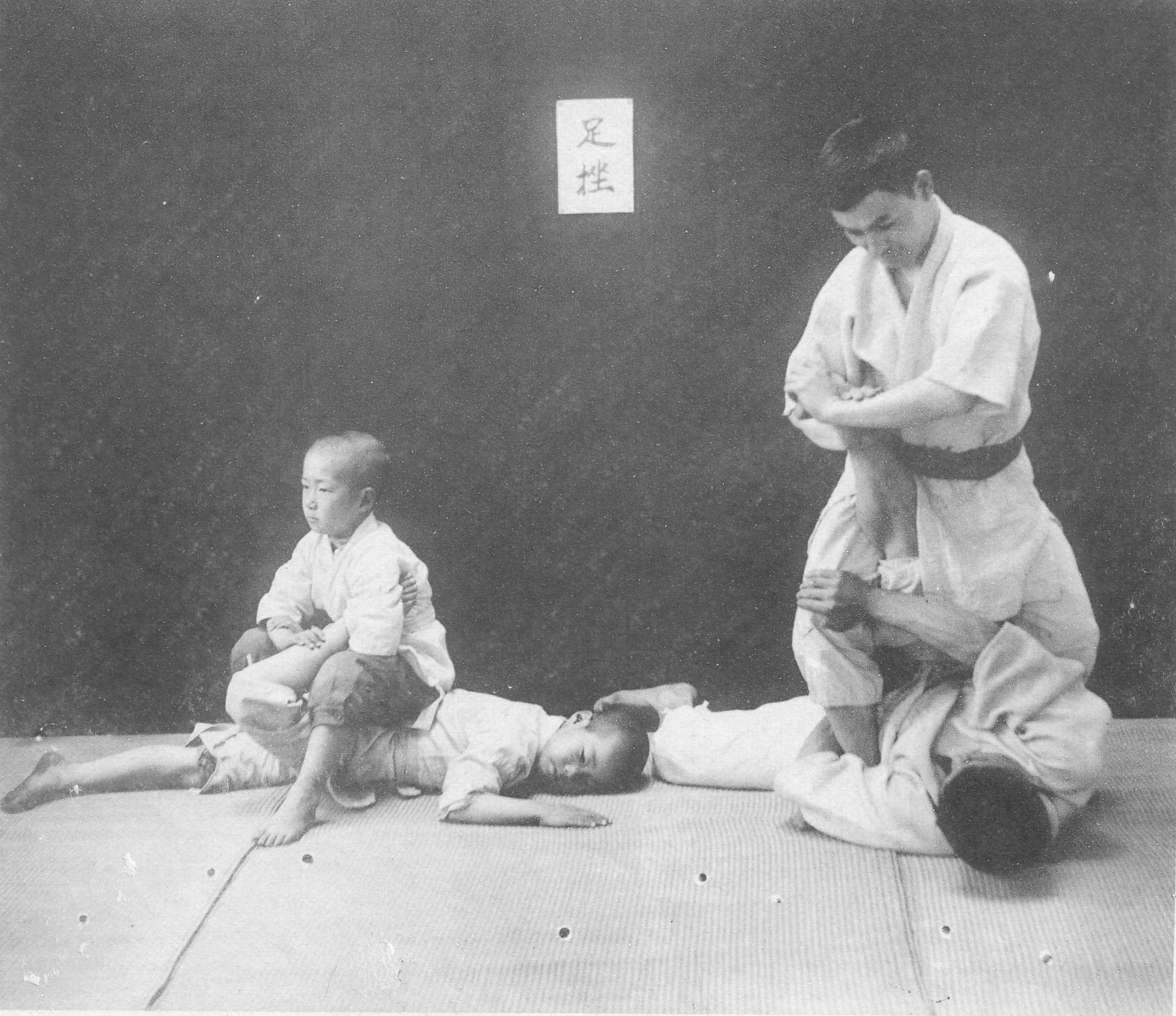
- An ankle-lock submission being performed in a Sport Sambo match in the United States
- Classification: Katame-waza
- Sub classification: Kansetsu-waza
- Kodokan: No

Technique name
- Rōmaji: Ashi-hishigi
- Japanese: 足挫
- English: Achilles ankle lock

Ashi-Hishigi (足挫) also called an Achilles lock or simply an ankle lock, is a technique described in both The Canon Of Judo by Kyuzo Mifune and Brazilian Jiu-Jitsu, Theory and Technique by Renzo Gracie and Royler Gracie as well as demonstrated in the video, The Essence Of Judo. It is classified as a joint lock (Kansetsu-waza), and is not a recognized technique of the Kodokan. However, it is a commonly used technique in both Brazilian Jiu-Jitsu tournaments, mixed martial arts competitions, and in professional wrestling by wrestlers such as Kurt Angle, Ken Shamrock, and later, Jack Swagger.

== Technique Description ==
Executing this lock involves pressing the achilles tendon into the back of the ankle or lower leg. It is typically performed by wedging a forearm, especially a bony part of it, into the Achilles tendon. Simultaneously leveraging the foot and the leg over the forearm, which serves as a fulcrum. This causes severe pressure on the Achilles tendon, often resulting in an ankle lock, since the ankle is being used as a point of leverage. Similarly, some ankle locks also cause a compression lock on the Achilles tendon, and hence the term "Achilles lock" is often also used to describe such ankle locks.

== Included Systems ==
Lists:

- The Canon Of Judo
- Judo technique

== Similar Techniques, Variants, and Aliases ==
Aliases:

- Achilles lock
- Ankle lock or Straight ankle lock
