= Okuri ashi barai =

Judo technique

Okuri ashi barai 送足払
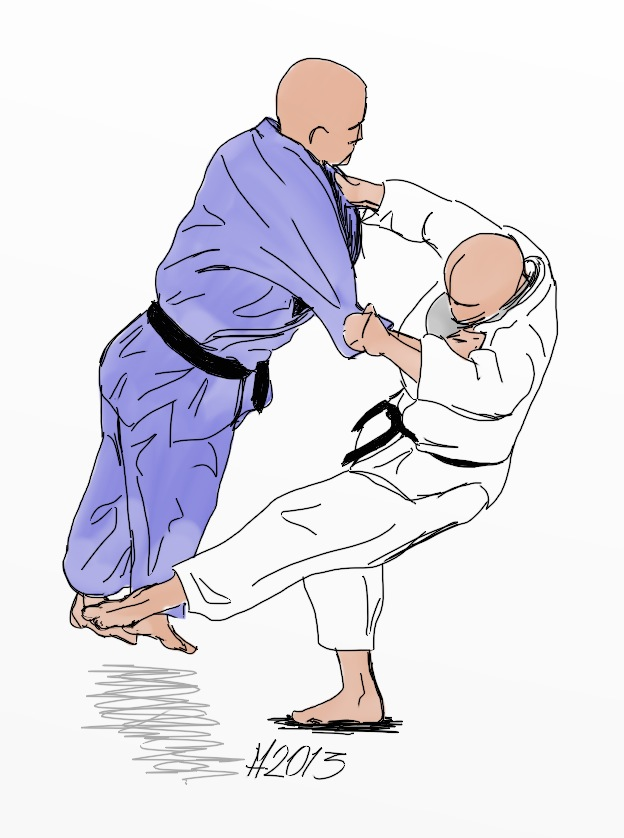
- An illustration of okuri ashi barai
- Classification: Nage-waza
- Sub classification: Ashi-waza
- Kodokan: Yes

Technique name
- Rōmaji: Okuri ashi barai
- Japanese: 送足払
- English: Sending foot sweep, or sliding foot sweep
- Korean: 모두 걸기

Okuri ashi barai or okuri ashi harai (送足払) is one of the original 40 throws of Judo as developed by Kano Jigoro. It is a foot sweep where both of uke's feet are swept from under them. It belongs to the second group of the traditional throwing list in the Gokyo no waza of the Kodokan Judo. It is also part of the current 67 Throws of Kodokan Judo. It is classified as a foot technique (ashiwaza).

== Technique description ==
Okuriashi harai is a double foot sweep from standing position. To execute the technique, extend the stepping motion of the opponent's leg towards his other leg by using your foot pushing against his foot's instep or side. The sweep is most effective against a retreating opponent and does not work if just one of his feet leaves the ground.

== Similar techniques ==
- De ashi barai: sweeping of one foot either forward or sideways
- Harai tsuri komi ashi: sweeping one foot backwards

== See also ==
- Judo technique
- The Canon Of Judo
