= Ryo te jime =

Judo technique

- Classification: Katame-waza
- Sub classification: Shime-waza
- Targets: Throat
- Kodokan: Yes

Technique name
- Rōmaji: Ryō-Te-Jime
- Japanese: 両手絞
- English: Two-hand strangle

Ryō-Te-Jime (両手絞) is one of the twelve constriction techniques of Kodokan Judo in the Shime-waza list.

== Included systems ==
Systems:

- Kodokan Judo, Judo Lists

Lists

- The Canon Of Judo
- Judo technique

== Similar techniques, variants, and aliases ==
Aliases:

- Both hand choke
- Two-hand choke
