= List of Kodokan judo techniques =

Like many other martial arts, Kodokan judo provides lists of techniques students must learn to earn rank. For a more complete list of judo techniques by technique classification, including Japanese kanji, see the article judo techniques.

== Ukemi (breakfalls) ==
Students first learn how to fall, and must master the fall exercises before moving on to the throws lists.

- Mae ukemi (前受け身): Forward breakfall
- Ushiro ukemi (後ろ受身): Backward breakfall
- Yoko ukemi (横受け身): Sideways breakfall (accompanied by hard slap of tatami mat)
- Mae Mawari Ukemi (前回り受身) or Zenpō Kaiten Ukemi (前方回転受身): Forward roll

== Nage-waza (throwing techniques) ==
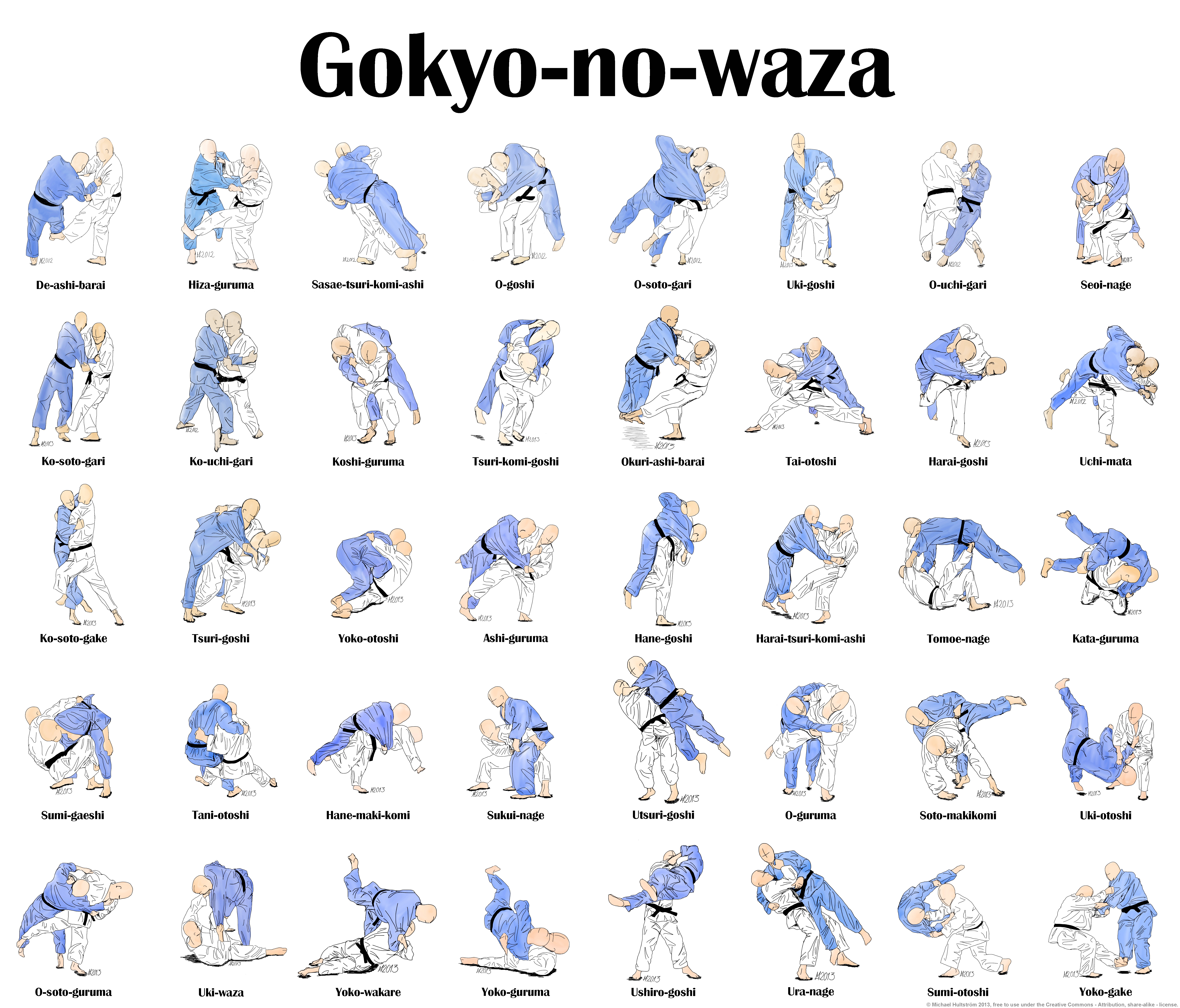
Media related to Judo Nage-waza at Wikimedia Commons Gokyo-no-waza (五教の技): Five sets of techniques Techniques are put into five groups of increasing difficulty that demonstrate progression through judo and may or may not correspond to belts.

The 68 throws of Kodokan judo:

=== Dai ikkyo (第一教) ===
(1st group)

1. De ashi barai (or harai) (出足払): Advanced foot sweep
2. Hiza guruma (膝車): Knee wheel
3. Sasae tsurikomi ashi (支釣込足): Propping and drawing ankle throw
4. Uki goshi (浮腰): Floating hip throw
5. O soto gari (大外刈): Big outer reap
6. O goshi (大腰): Full hip throw
7. O uchi gari (大内刈): Big inner reap
8. Seoi nage (背負投): Shoulder throw

=== Dai nikyo (第二教) ===
(2nd group)

1. Ko soto gari (小外刈): Small outer reap
2. Ko uchi gari (小内刈): Small inner reap
3. Koshi guruma (腰車): Hip wheel
4. Tsurikomi goshi (釣込腰): Lifting-and-pulling hip throw
5. Okuri ashi barai (送足払): Sliding foot sweep
6. Tai otoshi (体落): Body drop
7. Harai goshi (払腰): Sweeping hip throw
8. Uchi mata (内股): Inner-thigh

=== Dai sankyo (第三教) ===
(3rd group)

1. Kosoto gake (小外掛): Small outer hook
2. Tsuri goshi (釣腰): Lifting hip throw
3. Yoko otoshi (横落): Side drop
4. Ashi guruma (足車): Leg wheel
5. Hane goshi (跳腰): Spring hip throw
6. Harai tsurikomi ashi (払釣込足): Lift-pull foot sweep
7. Tomoe nage (巴投): Circle throw
8. Kata guruma (肩車): Shoulder wheel

=== Dai yonkyo (第四教) ===
(4th group)

1. Sumi gaeshi (隅返): Corner reversal
2. Tani otoshi (谷落): Valley drop
3. Hane makikomi (跳巻込): Springing wraparound
4. Sukui nage (掬投): Scoop throw
5. Utsuri goshi (移腰): Shifting hip throw
6. O guruma (大車): Large wheel
7. Soto makikomi (大外巻込): Big outer wraparound
8. Uki otoshi (浮落): Floating drop

=== Dai gokyo (第五教) ===
(5th group)

1. Osoto guruma (大外車): Big outer wheel
2. Uki waza (浮技): Floating technique
3. Yoko wakare (横分): Side separation
4. Yoko guruma (横車): Side wheel
5. Ushiro goshi (後腰): Rear hip throw
6. Ura nage (裏投): Rear throw
7. Sumi otoshi (隅落): Corner drop
8. Yoko gake (横掛): Side prop

=== Habukareta waza (省かれた技) ===
(preserved techniques from 1895 gokyo)

1. Obi otoshi (帯落): Belt drop
2. Seoi otoshi (背負落): Shoulder drop
3. Yama arashi (山嵐): Mountain storm
4. Osoto otoshi (大外落): Big outer drop
5. Daki wakare (抱分): High separation
6. Hikikomi gaeshi (引込返): Pulling in reversal
7. Tawara gaeshi (俵返): Rice bag reversal throw
8. Uchi makikomi (内巻込): Inner wraparound

=== Shinmeisho no waza (新名称の技) ===
(newly accepted techniques in 1987, 1997 and 2017)

1. Morote gari (双手刈): Two-hand reap
2. Kuchiki taoshi (朽木倒): Single leg takedown
3. Kibisu gaeshi (踵返): One-hand reversal
4. Uchi mata sukashi (内股透): Inner thigh void throw
5. Tsubame gaeshi (燕返): Swallow counter
6. Kouchi gaeshi (小内返): Small inner reap reversal
7. Ouchi gaeshi (大内返): Big inner reap counter
8. Osoto gaeshi (大外返): Big outer reap counter
9. Harai goshi gaeshi (払腰返): Hip sweep counter
10. Uchi mata gaeshi (内股返): Inner-thigh counter
11. Hane goshi gaeshi (跳腰返): Hip spring counter
12. Kani basami (蟹挟): Crab or scissors throw (Forbidden in competition)
13. Osoto makikomi (大外巻込): Big outer wraparound
14. Kawazu gake (河津掛): One-leg entanglement (Forbidden in competition)
15. Harai makikomi (払巻込): Hip sweep wraparound
16. Uchi mata makikomi (内股巻込): Inner thigh wraparound
17. Sode tsurikomi goshi (袖釣込腰): Sleeve lifting-and-pulling hip throw
18. Ippon seoi nage (一本背負投): Single-handed shoulder throw
19. Obi tori gaeshi (帯取返): Belt grab reversal
20. Ko uchi makikomi (小内巻込): Small inner wraparound
- Daki age (抱上): high lift, was excluded as a Kodokan officially recognized technique.

== Katame-waza (grappling techniques) ==
The 32 official grappling techniques of Kodokan judo

=== Osaekomi-waza "抑込技" ===
(pins / mat holds)

1. Kesa-gatame (袈裟固): Scarf hold
2. Kata-gatame (肩固): Shoulder hold
3. Kami-shiho-gatame (上四方固): Upper four quarter hold down
4. Kuzure-kami-shiho-gatame (崩上四方固): Broken upper four quarter hold down
5. Yoko-shiho-gatame (横四方固): Side four quarter hold
6. Tate-shiho-gatame (縦四方固): Vertical four quarter hold
7. Kuzure-kesa-gatame (崩袈裟固): Broken scarf hold
8. Uki-gatame (浮固): Floating hold (Added 2017)
9. Ura-gatame (裏固): Back hold (Added 2017)
10. Ushiro-kesa-gatame (後袈裟固): Reverse scarf hold (Added 2017)

=== Shime-waza ===
(chokes or strangles)

1. Nami-juji-jime (並十字絞): Normal cross strangle
2. Gyaku-juji-jime (逆十字絞): Reverse cross strangle
3. Kata-juji-jime (片十字絞): Half cross strangle
4. Hadaka-jime (裸絞): Naked strangle
5. Okuri-eri-jime (送襟絞): Sliding lapel strangle
6. Kata-ha-jime (片羽絞): Single wing strangle
7. Do-jime (胴絞): Trunk strangle (Forbidden in competition)
8. Sode-guruma-jime (袖車絞): Sleeve wheel strangle (Eziquiel/Ezekiel choke)
9. Kata-te-jime (片手絞): One-hand strangle
10. Ryo-te-jime (両手絞): Two-hand strangle
11. Tsukkomi-jime (突込絞): Thrust choke
12. Sankaku-jime (三角絞): Triangular strangle (Triangle choke)

=== Kansetsu-waza ===
(joint locks)

1. Ude-garami (腕緘): Arm entanglement (figure-four armlock)
2. Ude-hishigi-juji-gatame (腕挫十字固): Back-lying perpendicular armbar
3. Ude-hishigi-ude-gatame (腕挫腕固): Armlock
4. Ude-hishigi-hiza-gatame (腕挫膝固): Knee armbar
5. Ude-hishigi-waki-gatame (腕挫腋固): Armpit arm entanglement
6. Ude-hishigi-hara-gatame (腕挫腹固): Side-extended armbar
7. Ashi-garami (足緘): Leg entanglement (Forbidden in competition)
8. Ude-hishigi-ashi-gatame (腕挫脚固): Side-lying armbar
9. Ude-hishigi-te-gatame (腕挫手固): Hand lock
10. Ude-hishigi-sankaku-gatame (腕挫三角固): Triangular armbar

== Kinshi-waza (forbidden techniques) ==
These are techniques that have been removed from competition, mostly because of their high risk of injury.

1. Ashi-garami (足緘): Leg entanglement
2. Do-jime (胴絞): Trunk strangle
3. Kani-basami (蟹挟): Crab or scissors throw
4. Kawazu-gake (河津掛): One-leg entanglement

== See also ==
- List of judo techniques
