= Tsukkomi jime =

Judo technique

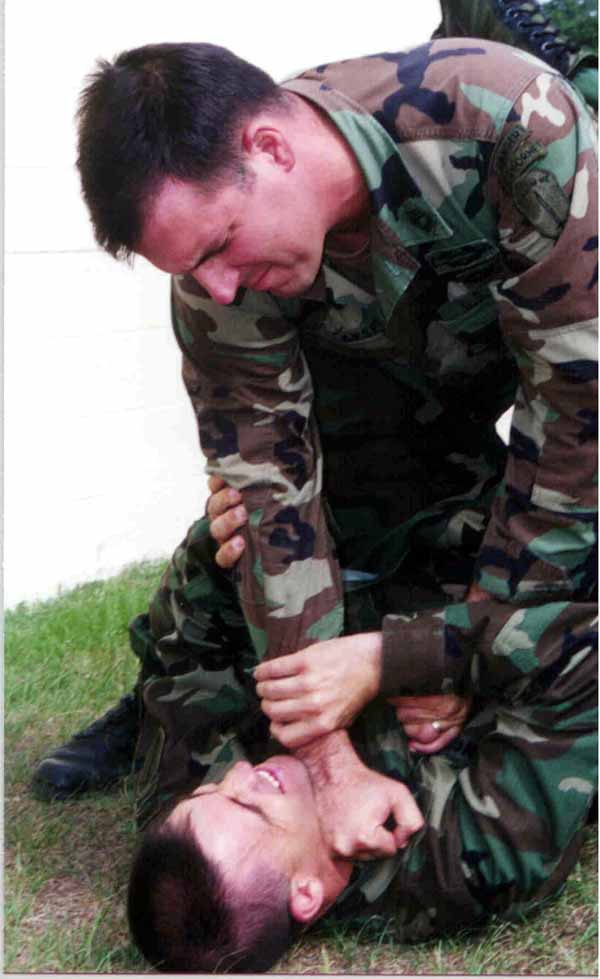
- Tsukkomi jime
- Classification: Katame-waza
- Sub classification: Shime-waza
- Kodokan: Yes

Technique name
- Rōmaji: Tsukkomi-Jime
- Japanese: 突込絞
- English: Thrust choke

Tsukkomi-Jime (突込絞) is one of the twelve constriction techniques of Kodokan Judo in the Shime-waza list.

== Technique description ==
Graphic from http://www.judoinfo.com/techdrw.htm

Exemplar videos:

== Included systems ==
Systems:

- Kodokan Judo, Judo Lists

Lists

- The Canon Of Judo
- Judo technique

== Similar techniques, variants, and aliases ==
Aliases:

- Thrust choke

Variants:

- Necktie jime
