= Kawazu gake =

Judo technique

- Classification: Nage-waza
- Sub classification: Sutemi-waza
- Targets: Leg
- Kodokan: Yes

Technique name
- Rōmaji: Kawazu gake
- Japanese: 河津掛
- English: One-leg entanglement

Kawazu Gake (河津掛) is a leg entanglement throw in Judo that targets an opponent's leg. It is one of the techniques adopted later by the Kodokan into their Shinmeisho No Waza (newly accepted techniques) list. It is categorized as a side sacrifice technique, Yoko-sutemi. It is also one of the four forbidden techniques, Kinshi-waza.

It is also a rarely used kimarite (winning technique) in sumo, where it is allowed.

== See also ==
- The Canon Of Judo
