= Osoto guruma =

Judo technique

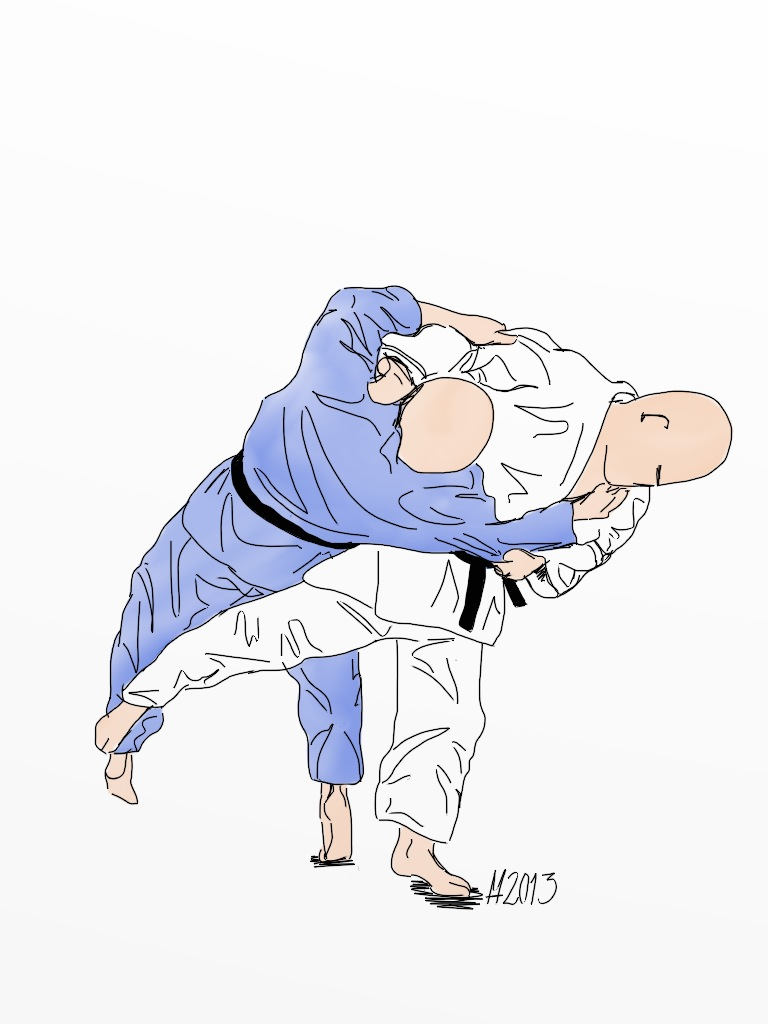
- O-soto-guruma illustration
- Classification: Nage-waza
- Sub classification: Ashi-waza
- Kodokan: Yes

Technique name
- Rōmaji: Osoto guruma
- Japanese: 大外車
- English: Major outer wheel
- Korean: 두밭다리 걸기

Osoto Guruma (大外車), is one of the original 40 throws of Judo as developed by Jigoro Kano. It belongs to the fifth group,

Gokyo, of the traditional throwing list, Gokyo (no waza), of Kodokan Judo. It is also part of the current 67 Throws of Kodokan Judo. It is classified as a foot technique, Ashi-waza.

== Technique description ==
Similar to Osotogari with the exception that the tori's attacking foot is placed behind both of uke's legs, rather that only the near leg.

== Included systems ==
Systems:

- Kodokan Judo, Judo Lists

Lists:

- The Canon Of Judo
- Judo technique

== Similar techniques, variants, and aliases ==
English aliases:

- Large outer wheel

Similar techniques:

- O Soto Gari: action on one leg
