= Ude hishigi ashi gatame =

Judo technique

- Classification: Katamewaza
- Sub classification: Kansetsu-waza
- Targets: Arm
- Kodokan: Yes

Technique name
- Rōmaji: Ude-hishigi-ashi-gatame
- Japanese: 腕挫脚固
- English: Side-lying arm bar

Ude-Hishigi-Ashi-Gatame (腕挫脚固), sometimes called Ashi-gatame for short, is one of the official 29 grappling techniques of Kodokan Judo. It is one of the nine joint techniques of the Kansetsu-waza list, one of the three grappling lists in Judo's Katame-waza enumerating 29 grappling techniques.

== Similar Techniques, Variants, and Aliases ==
IJF Official Names:

- Ude-hishigi-ashi-gatame(腕挫脚固)
- U.H. ashi-gatame
- Ashi-gatame(脚固)
- AGA

Alias:

- Leg Armlock
- Ude-hishigi-hara-gatame(腕挫腹固)

== Included Systems ==
- Judo

== See also ==
- Judo Techniques
- Judo Lists
