= Ude hishigi hiza gatame =

Judo technique

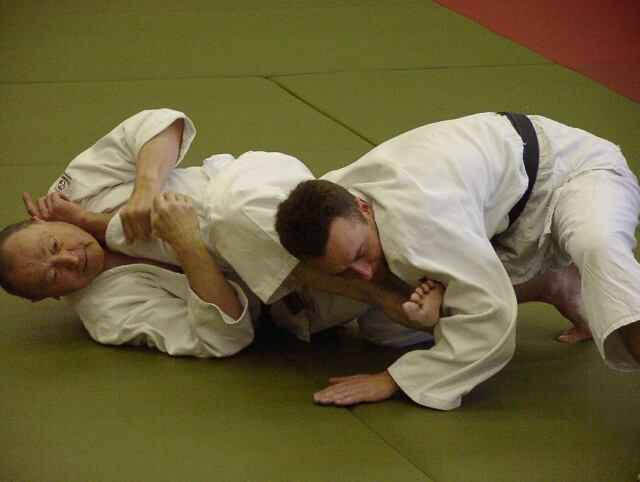
- Vladimir Lorenz shows Ude hishigi hiza gatame
- Classification: Katame-waza
- Sub classification: Kansetsu-waza
- Kodokan: Yes

Technique name
- Rōmaji: Ude-hishigi-hiza-gatame
- Japanese: 腕挫膝固
- English: Knee arm bar

Ude-Hishigi-Hiza-Gatame (腕挫膝固) is one of the official 29 grappling techniques of Kodokan Judo. It is one of the nine joint techniques of the Kansetsu-waza list, one of the three grappling lists in Judo's Katame-waza enumerating 29 grappling techniques. All of Judo's competition legal joint techniques are arm locks.

== Technique Description ==
Hiza refers to the knee, Gatame refers to pin. This technique involves using the knee to joint lock and pin the opponent. Once the opponent is face down an arm bar can be applied using the knee on the opponents elbow, the opponents hand must be pinky up. Upwards pressure can be applied on the wrist while downward pressure is applied with the knee on the elbow. The inside of the knee area can also be used to torque the elbow/shoulder from a bottom transition.

== Similar Techniques, Variants, and Aliases ==
Variants

- Sankaku garami(Omoplata)
- Reverse Omoplata
- V-cross armlock

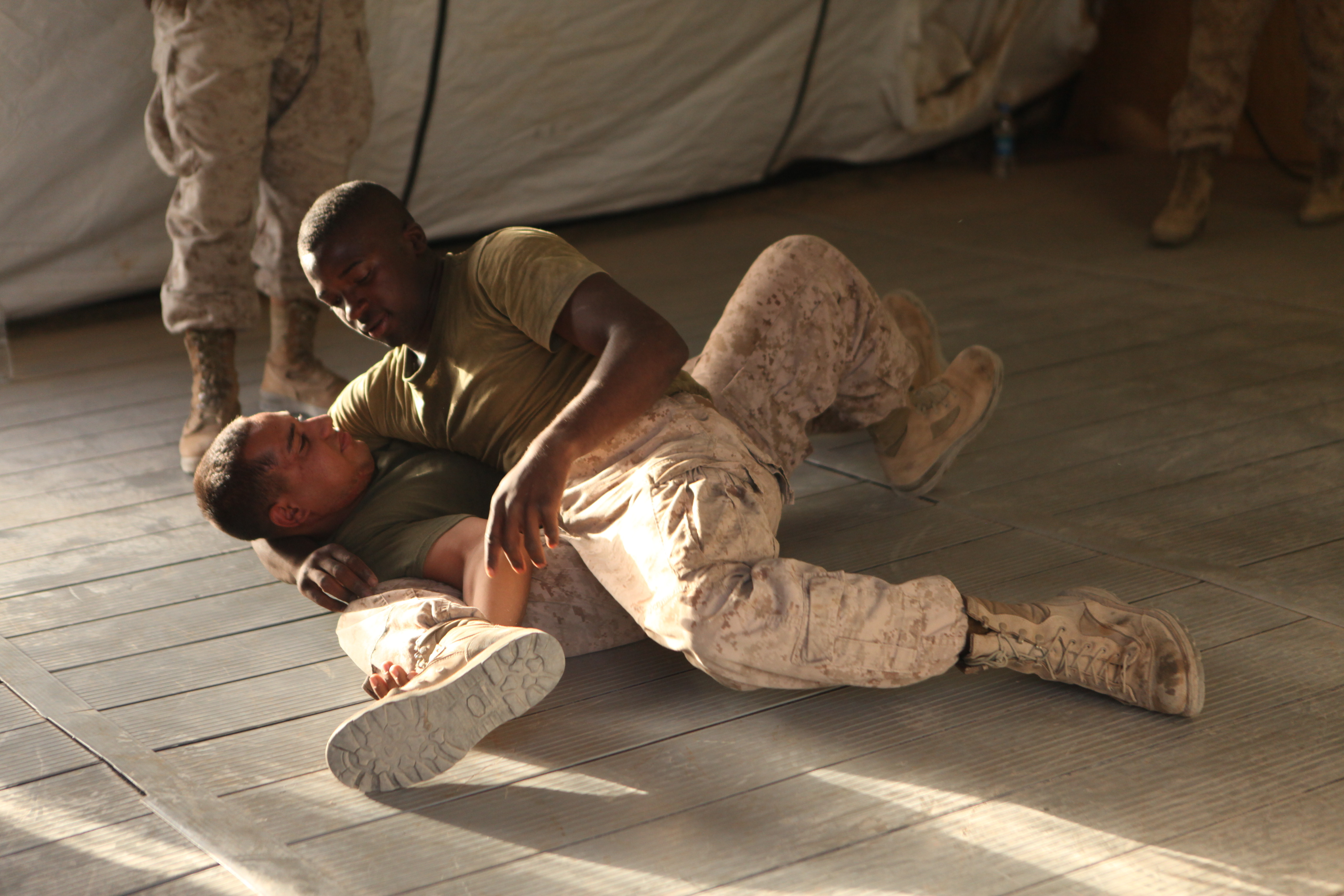
V-cross armlock(Unorthodox Americana shoulder lock applied using a leg)

IJF Official Aliases:

- U.H. hiza gatame
- Hiza gatame(膝固)

Variants or Aliases

- Ude-Hishigi-Betsu-Gata

Ude-Hishigi-Betsu-Gata is also described in The Canon Of Judo, this technique is similar to the second variation below, Ude-Hishigi-Ude-Gatame-Ni, except that Uke remains on their feet while Tori wraps one of his legs around Uke's arm.

- Hiza gatame ude kujiki
- Ude gatame ude kujiki
- Tachiai ude kujiki
- Tatsumaki Jime (Danzan Ryu)

== Included Systems ==
Systems:

- Kodokan Judo, Judo Lists

Lists:

- The Canon Of Judo
- Judo technique
- The video, The Essence of Judo featuring Kyuzo Mifune
  - Hiza gatame ude kujiki
  - Ude gatame ude kujiki (2nd pattern, 4th pattern)
  - Tachiai ude kujiki
