= Randori-no-kata =

Martial arts forms/techniques

- Classification: Kata
- Sub classification: Kodokan kata
- Kodokan: Yes

Technique name
- Rōmaji: Randori-no-kata
- Japanese: 乱取りの形
- English: Free practice forms

The Randori-no-kata (乱取りの形, Free practice forms) of Kodokan Judo consist of two kata that illustrate the principles behind techniques used in Randori (乱取り, free-practice), allowing them to be practiced with maximum efficiency. The randori-no-kata includes nage-no-kata (投の形, forms of throwing), which teach and demonstrate concepts of nage-waza (投げ技, throwing techniques) and katame-no-kata (固の形, forms of grappling), which are intended to teach concepts of katame-waza (固技, grappling techniques).

The randori-no-kata were developed by Jigoro Kano as a teaching aid when it became apparent that he had too many students to effectively demonstrate throws and grappling techniques in his classes. The kata were developed in five years that followed the establishment of the Kodokan, between 1882 and 1887. They originally consisted of ten techniques each and were expanded to fifteen techniques around 1906.
