= Do-jime =

Judo technique

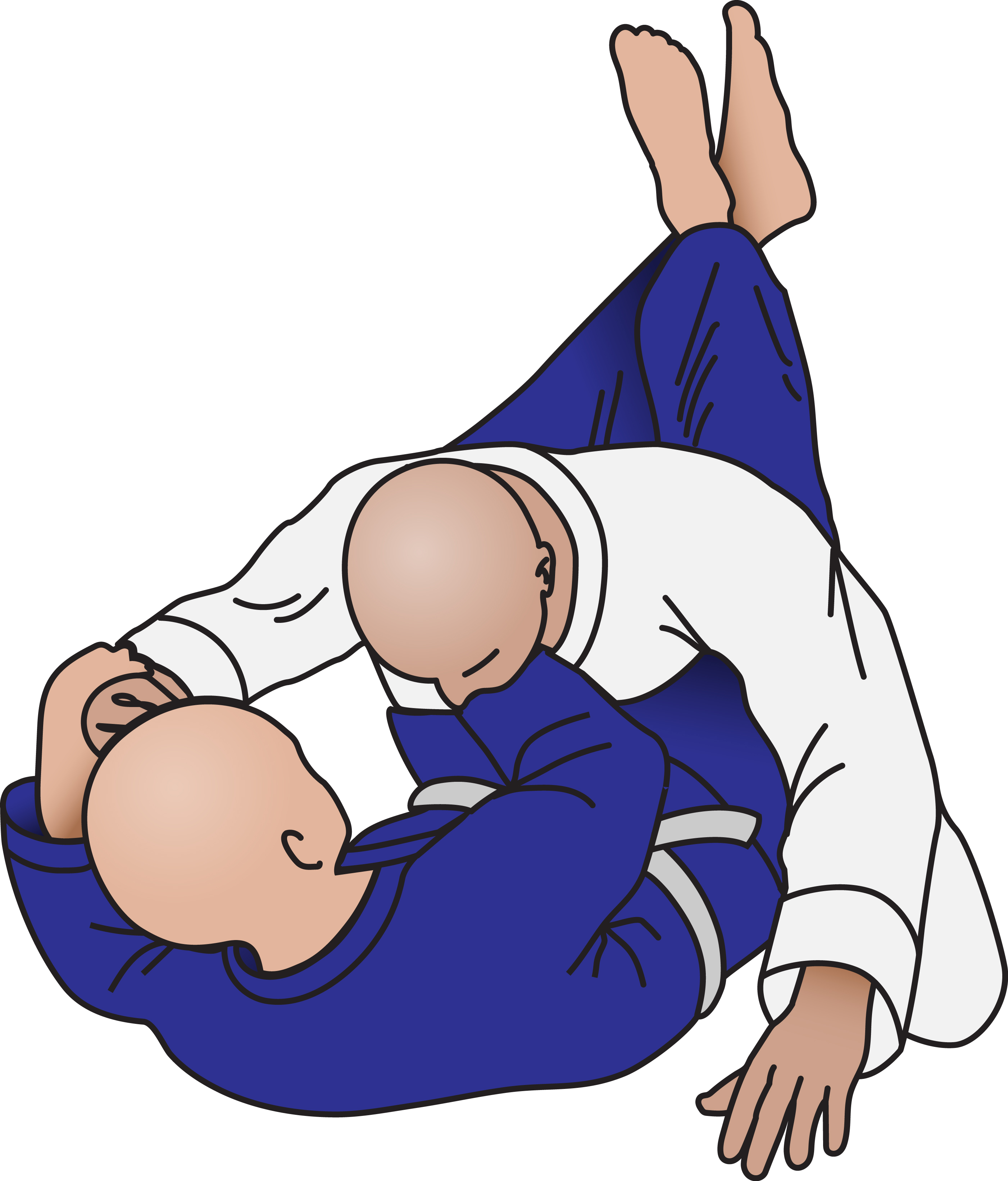
- Classification: Katame-waza
- Sub classification: Shime-waza
- Grip: Guard or Back control with legs crossed
- Successive techniques: Sankaku-jime
- Targets: Trunk
- Kodokan: Yes

Technique name
- Rōmaji: Do-jime
- Japanese: 胴絞
- English: Trunk lock

Do-jime (胴絞, Dō-jime; Trunk constriction) is a chokehold in judo. It is one of the twelve constriction techniques of Kodokan Judo in the Shime-waza list. Do-jime is one of the four forbidden techniques, Kinshi-waza. Do-jime is also a prohibited technique in Judo competitions, and is considered a 'major infringement', which awards the executer (Tori) with Hansoku-make (disqualification) according to IJF rules, Section 18.2.2: Prohibited acts and penalties, article 21.

== See also ==
- The Canon Of Judo
- Compressive asphyxia
