= Scissor kick (martial arts) =

Kicking or grabbing technique

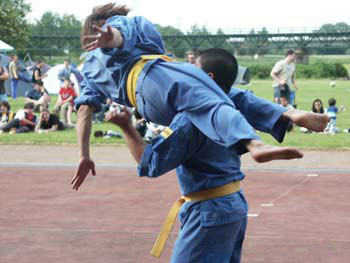
Flying scissors to the neck. The opponent is forced to the ground with a twist of the body.

A scissor kick in martial arts is any of certain kicking or grabbing techniques that resemble a pair of scissors.

== In the Asian martial arts ==
It may describe a mid-air kick in which both legs are swung or kicked out in different directions to strike two opponents simultaneously or in rapid succession. This is particularly common in some schools of Taekwondo, Vovinam, and some Chinese martial arts, also in Silat and Pencak Silat where it is referred to as Gunting (in Malay language).

In sanshou, the scissor kick is used as a mid air take down where one leg presses on the opponent's chest while the other leg positioned behind the opponent's knees, and is delivered with enough symmetrical force to knock the opponent down; the scissor leg take down is one of the more advanced take downs in san shou and is an effective tool used in many matches.

In Judo, Kani basami, also known as Kane Sute in Danzan-ryū, is classified as a sacrifice throw, known as "scissors throw." It is less of a strike however and tends to be more similar to a foot sweep.

== In wrestling ==
This move is also well known in the professional wrestling world among many wrestlers and fans. The attacker jumps (from a standing or running position) using one leg for momentum and drives the other leg into the back of the head and the neck of the opponent.

Throughout his career, Booker T, a former wrestler in WWE, WCW, and TNA, is credited to having popularizing the move in the United States.

Various other wrestlers who uses this technique, such as former WWE wrestler Bull Buchanan and former TNA wrestler and current WWE wrestler Ron Killings, currently known as R-Truth, uses this as a regular move but performs a corkscrew variation of the move.

WWE Diva Alicia Fox and FCW Diva Caylee Turner use the scissor kick as a finishing move.

NXT Superstar Carmelo Hayes uses a top-rope variation of the scissor kick as a finisher, referred to as Nothing But Net.

== Other martial arts ==
There are also different versions of this moved used in Capoeira takedowns.
