= Ude hishigi hara gatame =

Judo technique

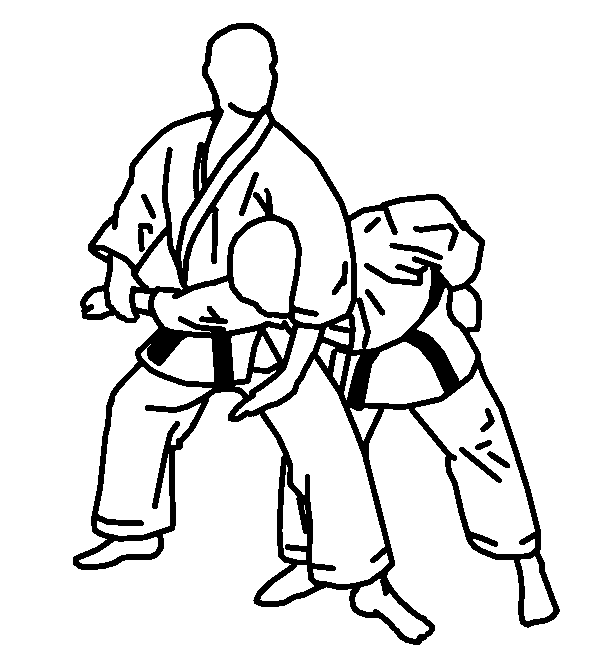
- Ude hishigi hara gatame at standing position
- Classification: Katame-waza
- Sub classification: Kansetsu-waza
- Kodokan: Yes

Technique name
- Rōmaji: Ude-hishigi-hara-gatame
- Japanese: 腕挫腹固
- English: Side-extended arm bar

Ude-Hishigi-Hara-Gatame (腕挫腹固) is one of the official 29 grappling techniques of Kodokan Judo. It is one of the nine joint techniques of the Kansetsu-waza list, one of the three grappling lists in Judo's Katame-waza enumerating 29 grappling techniques. All of Judo's competition legal joint techniques are arm locks.

== Similar Techniques, Variants, and Aliases ==
Variants or Aliases:

- Kata osae tai gatame ude kujiki

Kata osae tai gatame ude kujiki is a joint hold demonstrated in The Essence Of Judo feat. Kyuzo Mifune.

Examples of contests this finished

- 2018 Judo Grand Prix Zagreb men U66kg Round 1

Win Dzmitry Shershan(Belarus) (3:32 Hara gatame) Imad Bassou(Morocco) Loss IJF movie

IJF Official Names:

- Ude Hishigi Hara Gatame(腕挫腹固)
- U.H. hara gatame
- Hara gatame(腹固)
- HGA

Alias:

- Stomach Armlock

== Included Systems ==
Judo
