= Ushiro-kesa-gatame =

Judo technique

Ushiro-kesa-gatame (後袈裟固; Rear scarf hold) is an osaekomi-waza (holding technique) of judo. The hold works on the same basic principle as hon-kesa-gatame with the hold being applied across uke's chest with standard kesa-gatame leg positioning. What distinguishes ushiro-kesa-gatame from hon-kesa-gatame and kuzure-kesa-gatame is that tori's body positioning is reversed, facing towards uke's feet.
