= Kuzure kami shiho gatame =

Judo technique

- Illustration of Kuzure kesa gatame
- Classification: Katame-waza
- Sub classification: Osaekomi-waza
- Kodokan: Yes

Technique name
- Rōmaji: Kuzure-kami-shiho-gatame
- Japanese: 崩上四方固
- English: Broken upper four-quarter hold-down

Kuzure-Kami-Shiho-Gatame (崩上四方固) is one of the seven mat holds, Osaekomi-waza, of Kodokan Judo, a variation of Kami shiho gatame. In grappling terms, it is categorized as a north-south hold.

== Technique description ==
Executing the Kuzure-kami-shiho-gatame is similar to Kami shiho gatame, which involves pinning the opponent's arms to his or her side, typically by grabbing the opponent's belt and using the arms to press the arms of the opponent inwards. The difference between the two is instead of one or both arms of the opponent being pinned to the side, they are controlled for instance by pinning them in between an upper arm and a knee. Thus the 'broken' attribute for which the technique is named.

=== Escapes ===
- Ebi (Shrimp) Kami-Shiho-Gatame Escape
- Circling Bridge/Roll-over Kami-Shiho-Gatame Escape
- (Illegal) Tickle the pinners neck

=== Submissions ===
- North–south choke
- Various Gi chokes

== Included systems ==
Systems:

- Kodokan Judo, Judo Lists

Lists:

- The Canon Of Judo
- Judo technique

== Similar techniques, variants, and aliases ==
English aliases:

- Broken upper four quarter hold down
- Broken top four corner hold

Variants:

- Sankaku gatame(三角固)

Similar:

- Kami-Shiho-Gatame

== External Media ==
- Technique video demonstration
- Technique illustration
