= De ashi barai =

Judo technique

De ashi barai 出足払
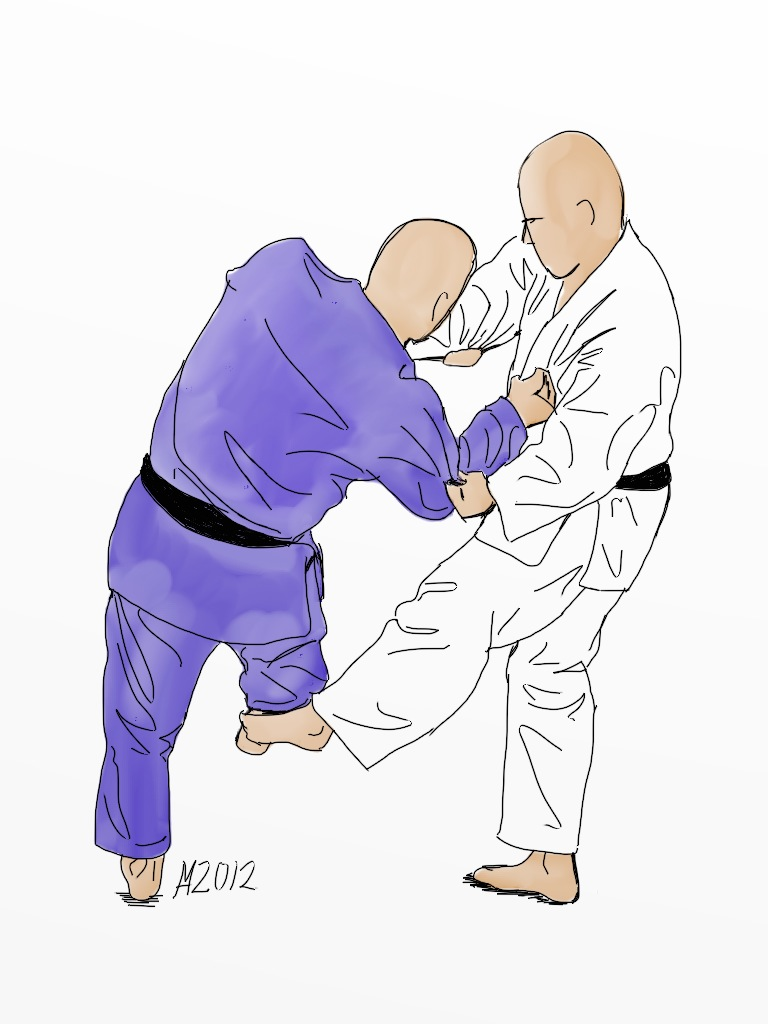
- An illustration of de ashi barai, showing how uke's lead foot is swept from under them
- Classification: Nage waza (throwing techniques)
- Sub classification: Ashi waza (foot techniques)
- Kodokan: Yes

Technique name
- Rōmaji: De ashi barai, or de ashi harai
- Japanese: 出足払
- English: Forward foot sweep or advancing foot sweep
- Korean: 나오는 발차기

De ashi barai or de ashi harai (出足払) ("forward foot sweep") is one of the original 40 throws of Judo as developed by Jigoro Kano. It is a foot sweep and is classified in judo as an ashi waza, or "foot technique". It belongs to the first group, Dai-Ikkyo, of the traditional throwing list, Gokyo-no-Nagewaza, of Kodokan Judo. It is also part of the current 67 Throws of Kodokan Judo. De ashi barai is also one of the 20 techniques in Danzan Ryu's (DZR) Nagete list.

== Description ==
Deashi Barai is one of the basic foot sweeps learned in the martial arts. As with most basic techniques, Deashi Barai has numerous variations.

One common method used in Danzan-ryu Jujitsu is the outside-in method of sweeping an opponent's foot. It is accomplished by initially having a firm grip on the opponent while facing him or her. The attacker then moves the foot to the opposite side of his opponent (right foot to opponent's left side, or vice versa), to sweep the opponent's opposite leg out from underneath him. Simultaneously the upper body must complement this push-pull motion with a great deal of power being generated from the rotation of the hips.

== Similar techniques, variants, and aliases ==
English aliases:

Similar techniques:

- okuri ashi barai: sweeping of both feet sideways
- harai tsurikomi ashi: the foot of uki is pushed backwards by the sweeping foot of tori instead of sideways in de ashi barai
- ko soto gari: sweeping of the foot that is planted on the ground and supports (a minimum amount of) weight. De ashi barai sweeps a foot that is not in contact with the ground and does not support any weight. The action of the sweeping foot of tori is roughly the same.
- Sasae tsurikomi ashi. This is a blocking action of the foot rather than a sweeping action.

== See also ==
- The Canon Of Judo
- Sasae Tsurikomi Ashi
- Okuriashi barai
- Kosoto Gari
