= Kosoto gake =

Judo technique

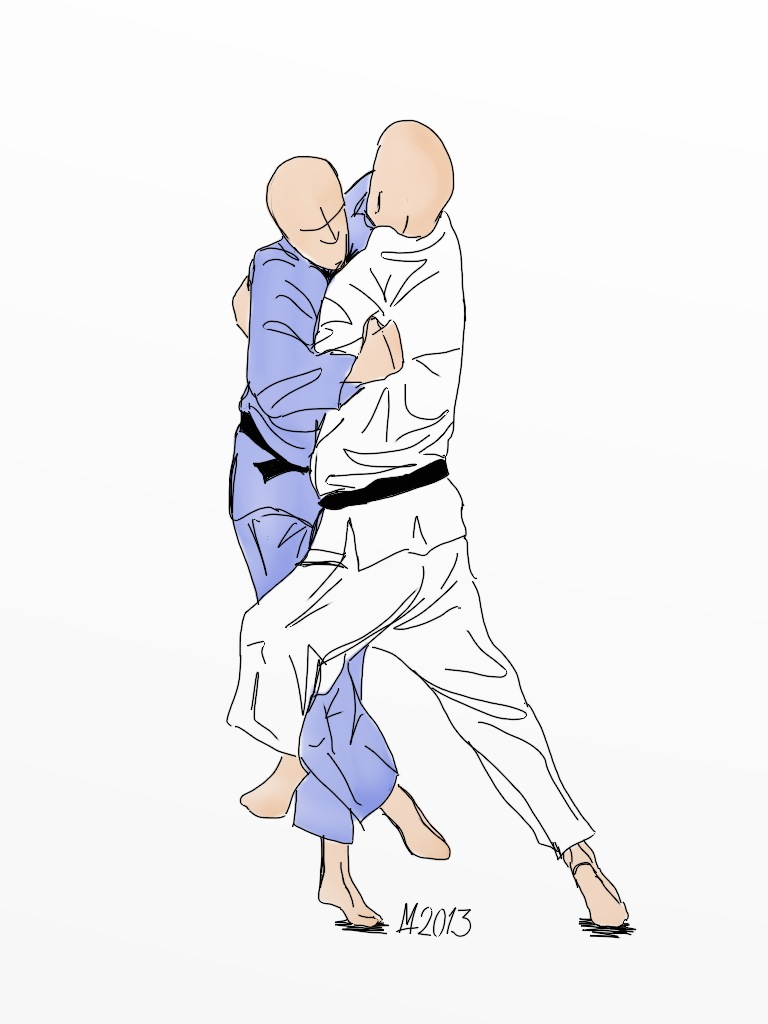
- Classification: Nage-waza
- Sub classification: Ashi-waza
- Kodokan: Yes

Technique name
- Rōmaji: Kosoto gake
- Japanese: 小外掛
- English: Small outer hook
- Korean: 발뒤축 걸기

Kosoto Gake (小外掛), sometimes known as "minor outer hook", the English translation, is one of the original 40 throws of Judo as developed by Jigoro Kano. It belongs to the third group, Sankyo, of the traditional throwing list, Gokyo (no waza), of Kodokan Judo. It is also part of the current 67 Throws of Kodokan Judo. It is classified as a foot technique, Ashi-waza. It is often used as a counter-throw to tai-otoshi, after having stepped over the leg. To perform the technique, the tori grabs uke using one of several compatible grips - the traditional example being the sleeve collar grip. He then steps forwards diagonally to place all of uke's weight on the foot tori wishes to reap. This leg is reaped by wrapping the leg around his leg from the outside (doing it from the inside is Ōuchi gari) and plucking the ankle or calf upward with the back of tori's own ankle or calf respectively. Because the weight was planted on this foot due to off-balancing uke, tori can make him fall. If uke's weight is not on the leg being swept, uke will remain stable and be able to keep his balance. This should all be done in a fluid motion so that uke's weight is moving backwards whilst the leg is being reaped, otherwise it will be too heavy to lift although the throw can still work sometimes from this position.

The opposite of this is Gyaku-kosoto Gake (Reverse Minor Outside Hook), which resembled the "step-over takedown" and is the first "throw" taught in Yanagi-Ryu.
