= Kata gatame =

Judo technique

- Classification: Katame-waza
- Successive techniques: Side choke
- Counter: Sweep
- Kodokan: Yes

Technique name
- Rōmaji: Kata gatame
- Japanese: 肩固め
- English: Shoulder hold

Kata-Gatame (肩固) is one of the seven mat holds, Osaekomi-waza, of Kodokan Judo. It is also one of the 25 techniques of Danzan Ryu's constriction arts, Shimete, list. In grappling terms, it is categorized as a side control hold. Primarily used as a hold down in Judo, it is mostly used as a choke in Jiu-Jitsu and mixed martial arts (also called arm triangle choke). WWE wrestler Braun Strowman and former Impact Wrestling Superstar, Samuel Shaw use this move as their finishing maneuver.

== Technique Description ==
Can be thought of as a variation of Kesa gatame, often employed when the Uke (person being pinned) gives the Tori (person pinning) trouble in securing the sleeve of the arm. If the Uke's arm is left unencumbered it can be used in various ways to break the Tori's pin control. The Tori will compensate by using his head and shoulder to press the Uke's arm up against the Uke's own head/neck in an effort to control the Uke's arm movement. The Tori should be up on at least one knee, keeping the knee as close to the Uke's body as possible. The Tori's other leg can be outstretched and used in an effort to provide adequate leverage and forward pressure.

== Escapes ==
- Elbow Drive Kata Gatame Escape
- Kata-Gatame Escape And Reverse

== Submissions ==
- Arm-triangle choke

== Variations ==
- Sitted Kata-Gatame
- Kneeling Kata-Gatame
- Sprawled Kata-Gatame
- Kneeling Stance Kata-Gatame , DZR's is often done as a Kneeling Stance Kata-Gatame, where tori keeps uke on his side with his thigh pressing against uke's back.
- Mounted Kata-Gatame

== See also ==
- The Canon Of Judo
- Kesa-Gatame
