= Kata ha jime =

Judo chokehold

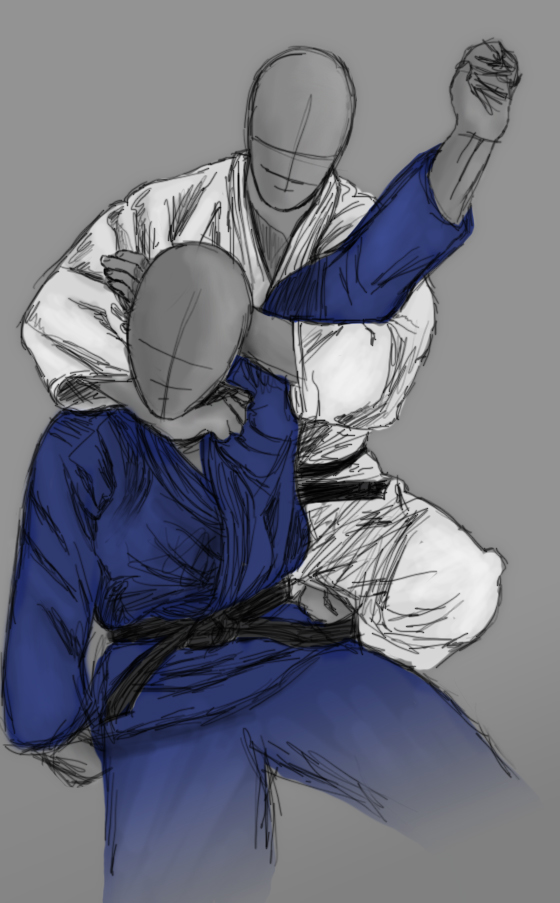
- Illustration of Kataha-jime judo choke
- Classification: Katame-waza
- Sub classification: Shime-waza
- Targets: Throat
- Kodokan: Yes

Technique name
- Rōmaji: Kata ha jime
- Japanese: 片羽絞
- English: Single wing choke

Kata-Ha-Jime (片羽絞), also spelled Katahajime, is a chokehold in judo. It is one of the twelve constriction techniques of Kodokan Judo in the Shime-waza list.

== Description ==
Kataha jime uses the lapel of the judo uniform to exert pressure on the carotid arteries (minimal pressure also being applied to the windpipe). The opponent's left arm is lifted and controlled as part of the technique.

== Examples of contests this finished ==
- "MUSA MOGUSHKOV (RUS) - MASASHI EBINUMA (JPN) @ U73 - GRAND SLAM DÜSSELDORF 2019". JudoInside. 2019-02-22.

== See also ==
- The Canon Of Judo
- Tazmission, a professional wrestling variation, dubbed and utilized by retired professional wrestler Taz
