= Kesa-gatame =

Judo technique

- Classic Kesa Gatame
- Classification: Katame-waza
- Sub classification: Osaekomi-waza
- Kodokan: yes

Technique name
- Japanese: 袈裟固
- English: Scarf hold
- Korean: 곁누르기

Kesa-Gatame (袈裟固) is one of the seven mat holds, Osaekomi-waza, of Kodokan Judo. In grappling terms, it is categorized as a side control hold. It is commonly referred to as scarfhold in English. The Japanese term kesa (袈裟) refers to a Buddhist Monk's sash worn from the left shoulder towards the right hip. It is also known in wrestling as the head and arm ride.

== Description ==
Many Judo throws lead naturally to Kesa-Gatame, since the classic judo hold places one grip on the opponent's lapel and one grip near the opponent's elbow. As one enters newaza (ground fighting), one arm encircles uke's neck while tori's sleeve grip provides control over uke's arm. In The Canon Of Judo, Kyuzo Mifune points out that tori's arm should lift uke's head and tori's leg should be under uke's shoulder.

== Technique ==
- Tori's Head Position:

Tori's head ought to be as low to the ground as possible, on the side of the held arm which greatly lowers tori's center of gravity and prevents a common roll-over counter by uke. This is frequently confused for the ideal head position in kuzure kesa gatame which ought to be more upright and above uke's.

- Tori's Arm Position:

Tori's arm should encircle and elevate uke's occiput as this diminishes the power of uke's bridge, which is a fundamental component of the roll-over and elbow escapes from kesa gatame. Significant variation exists for gripping strategies in kesa gatame but this is most commonly accomplished by gripping the back of uke's lapel, tori's own thigh, tori's far lapel or even clasping hands (Gable grip).

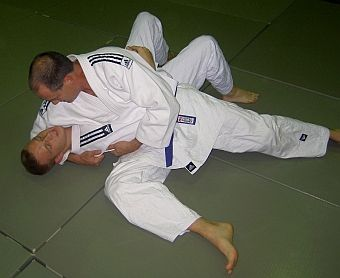
Tori (top) demonstrates a common mistake where the lead leg is flexed

- Tori's Leg Position:

Kodokan's technique guide (2020) and Kashiwazaki (1997) posits that tori's lead leg should be almost parallel to uke's trunk and be fully extended at the knee; this allows for foot plantar-flexion to be used as a post in countering uke's bridge. A common mistake for tori is to maintain their knee in a flexed (bent) position, this results in the loss of foot plantar-flexion as a primary post and renders tori susceptible to any forward momentum generated by uke's bridge. Another common mistake is for tori to leave their lead leg and thigh extended at the knee but perpendicular to uke's trunk, this results in the same problem as having a flexed knee. Tori's inability to maintain their leading leg in an extended parallel position puts him/her at risk of the roll-over counter to kesa gatame.

Tori's trail leg should be flexed at the knee with his/her knee touching the ground. Knee flexion allows for tori trail leg to counter a sit-up escape via foot plantar-flexion as this orientation causes tori's foot to be pointed rearwards. Maintaining tori's knee close to the mat prevents the initiation of the leg hook (niju ashi garami) escape; this lowers tori's center of gravity and also prevents the roll over escape. A common mistake is for tori to have their knee pointed upwards (in a squat) in an attempt to increase the amount of pressure exerted on uke. This causes more weight to be loaded onto uke's trunk at the expense of overall stability of the position as it increases tori's center of gravity (increasing susceptibility to the roll over escape) and significantly increases the susceptibility to the leg hook escape due to knee exposure.

== Escapes ==
- Elbow Pullout Escape:

Uke escapes by pulling out his held elbow and attempts to take tori's back or pull tori backwards into yoko-shiho-gatame.

- Roll-over Escape:

Uke clasps tori's trunk and bridges into tori, causing a forward shift of tori's weight off uke's abdomen. This is followed by a quick change in torque in the opposite direction, pulling tori across uke's shoulders or upper chest, landing in mune gatame.

- Leg Hook (niju ashi garami) Escape:

Uke turns his lower body to face tori in an attempt to hooks tori's thigh with his leg. If successful, uke can either hold tori in niju-ashi-garami and wait to be stood up or use tori's hooked thigh as leverage and roll to take tori's back.

- Sit Up Escape:

As tori circles towards uke's head to tighten kesa-gatame or avoid the leg hook counter, uke can use his/her legs as a counterweight to rapidly sit up and reverse tori into his/her own kesa-gatame. The kuzushi for this move stems from tori's rapid movement towards uke's head and would not otherwise be possible unless there is a significant difference in weight.

== Submissions ==
- Kesa-Ashi-Gatame, Double Leg Gatame Arm Bar
- Single Leg Gatame Arm Bar

And with some transitioning, the arm held is at risk of many other locks.

Also one step away is Kata-Gatame. Although categorized as a mat hold, it is also a choke if enough pressure is exerted correctly.

== Included systems ==
Systems:

- Kodokan Judo, Judo Lists

Lists:

- The Canon Of Judo
- Judo technique

== Similar techniques, variants, and aliases ==
=== Aliases ===
- Hon-Kesa-Gatame (Basic Scarf Hold)
- Scarfhold
- Headlock
- Head and Arm Hold

=== Variants ===
- Makura-Kesa-Gatame (Pillow Scarf Hold)

Tori places his right thigh under uke's head raising uke's head up.
Tori's right hand wraps under uke's left shoulder, and holds on to his right knee or thigh to lock his head and shoulder.
Tori leans forward to trap uke's head and spreads his legs.

=== Similar techniques ===
- Kuzure-Kesa-Gatame
- Ushiro-Kesa-Gatame(Rear Scarf Hold)

Ushiro-Kesa-Gatame is a mat hold demonstrated in The Essence Of Judo and described in The Canon Of Judo by Kyuzo Mifune, but unrecognized by the Kodokan. See also North south position.

- Ura-Kesa-Gatame(Back Scarf Hold)

Ura-Kesa-Gatame is a mat hold demonstrated in The Essence Of Judo and described in The Canon Of Judo by Kyuzo Mifune, but unrecognized by the Kodokan. See also North south position.
