= Ashi garami =

Judo technique

- Illustration of Ashi-Garami leglock
- Classification: Katame-waza
- Sub classification: Kansetsu-waza
- Targets: Leg
- Kodokan: Yes

Technique name
- Rōmaji: Ashi-Garami
- Japanese: 足緘
- English: Leg entanglement

Ashi garami (足緘) is a joint lock in judo that targets an opponent's leg. It is one of the official 29 grappling techniques of Kodokan Judo. It is one of the nine joint techniques of the Kansetsu-waza list, one of the three grappling lists in Judo's Katame-waza enumerating 29 grappling techniques. Ashi garami is one of the four Kinshi-waza, techniques now forbidden in competition for safety reasons.. This technique is also often utilized in modern Bjj in both gi and nogi grappling.

== See also ==
- The Canon Of Judo
- Joint lock
- Leglocks
