= Ude hishigi juji gatame =

Judo technique

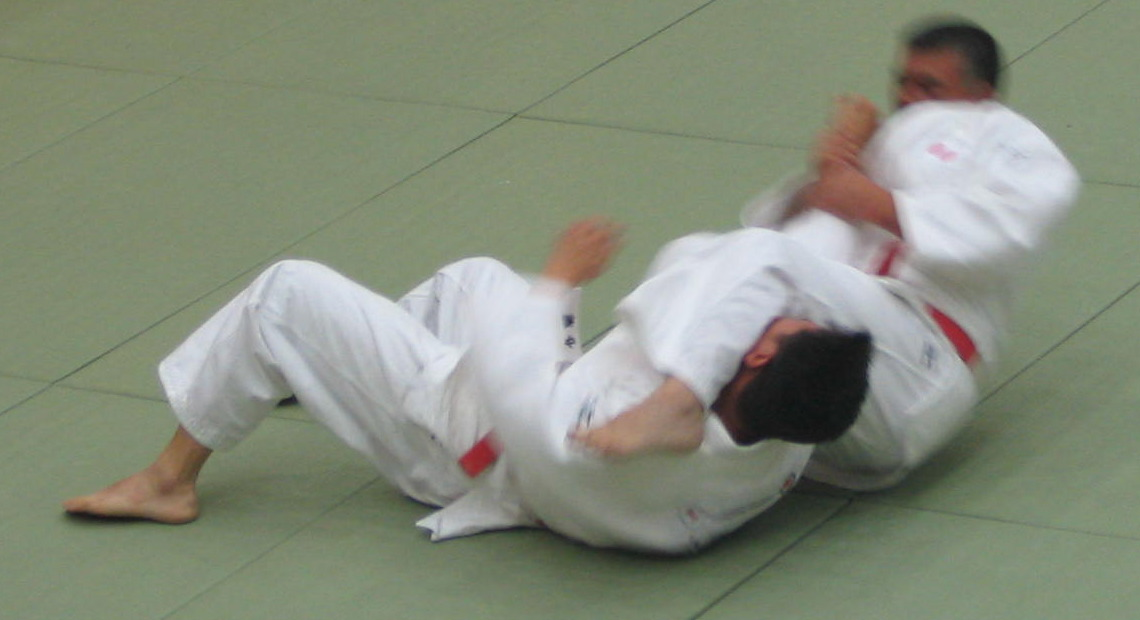
- Juji-gatame in Katame-no-kata
- Classification: Katame-waza
- Sub classification: Kansetsu-waza
- Kodokan: Yes

Technique name
- Rōmaji: Ude-hishigi-juji-gatame
- Japanese: 腕挫十字固
- English: Back-lying perpendicular armbar.

Ude-Hishigi-Juji-Gatame (腕挫十字固) is one of the official 29 grappling techniques of Kodokan Judo. It is one of the nine joint techniques of the Kansetsu-waza list, one of the three grappling lists in Judo's Katame-waza enumerating 29 grappling techniques. All of Judo's competition legal joint techniques are arm locks.

== Included systems ==
Systems:

- Kodokan Judo, Judo Lists

Lists:

- The Canon Of Judo
- Judo technique
- The video, The Essence of Judo featuring Kyuzo Mifune
  - Jumonji-Gatame-Ude-Kujiki(十文字固腕挫)
  - Ao-Muke-Gata-Ude-Kujiki(仰向形腕挫)
  - Sankaku-Gatame-Ude-Kujiki(3rd pattern)(三角固腕挫 その三)

== Similar techniques, variants, and aliases ==
IJF Official Names:

- Ude-hishigi-juji-gatame(腕挫十字固)
- U.H. juji-gatame
- Juji-gatame(十字固)
- JGT

Aliases:

- Upper cross arm armlock
- Arm Bar
- Cross armbar
