= Harai tsurikomi ashi =

Judo technique

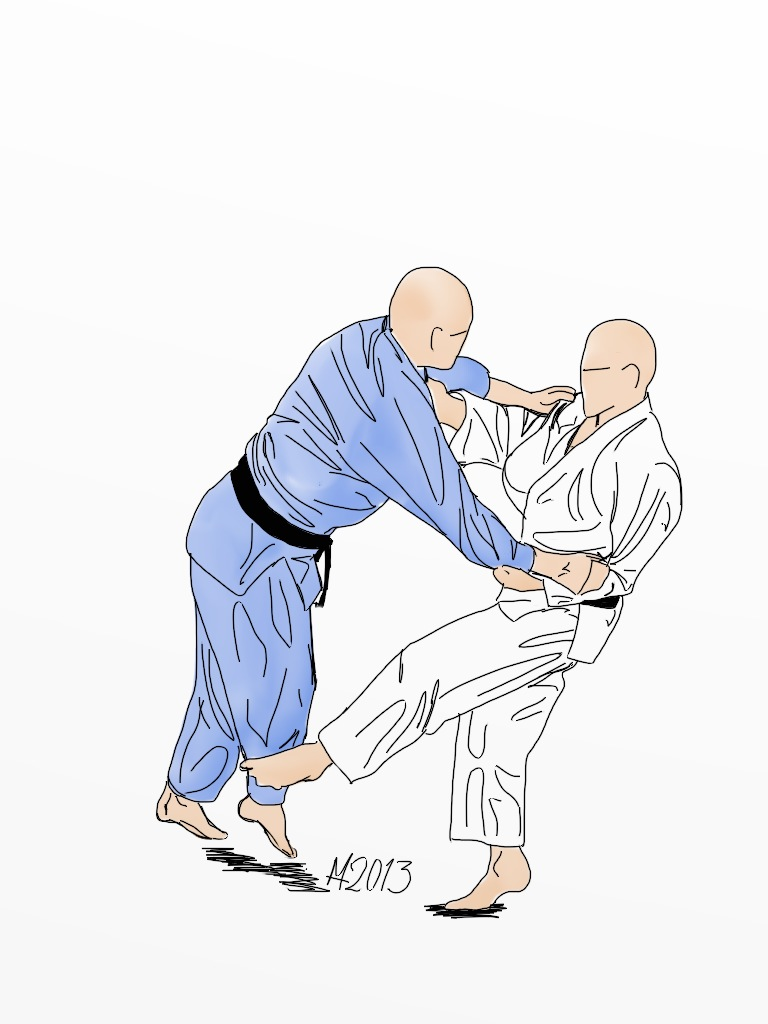
- Classification: Nage-waza
- Sub classification: Ashi-waza
- Kodokan: Yes

Technique name
- Rōmaji: Harai-tsurikomi ashi
- Japanese: 払釣込足
- English: Lift-pull foot sweep
- Korean: 무릎 받치기

Harai Tsurikomi Ashi (払釣込足) is one of the original 40 throws of Judo as developed by Jigoro Kano. It belongs to the third group, Sankyo, of the traditional throwing list, Gokyo (no waza), of Kodokan Judo. It is also part of the current 67 Throws of Kodokan Judo. It is classified as a foot technique, Ashi-waza.

== Similar techniques, variants, and aliases ==
- De Ashi Harai: sweeping of one foot either to the front or sideways.
- Sasae Tsuri Komi Ashi: Blocking of the foot to prevent it from stepping forward in contrast to the sweeping motion backwards in Harai Tsuri Komi Ashi.

== See also ==
- The Canon Of Judo
