= Foot sweep =

Martial art technique

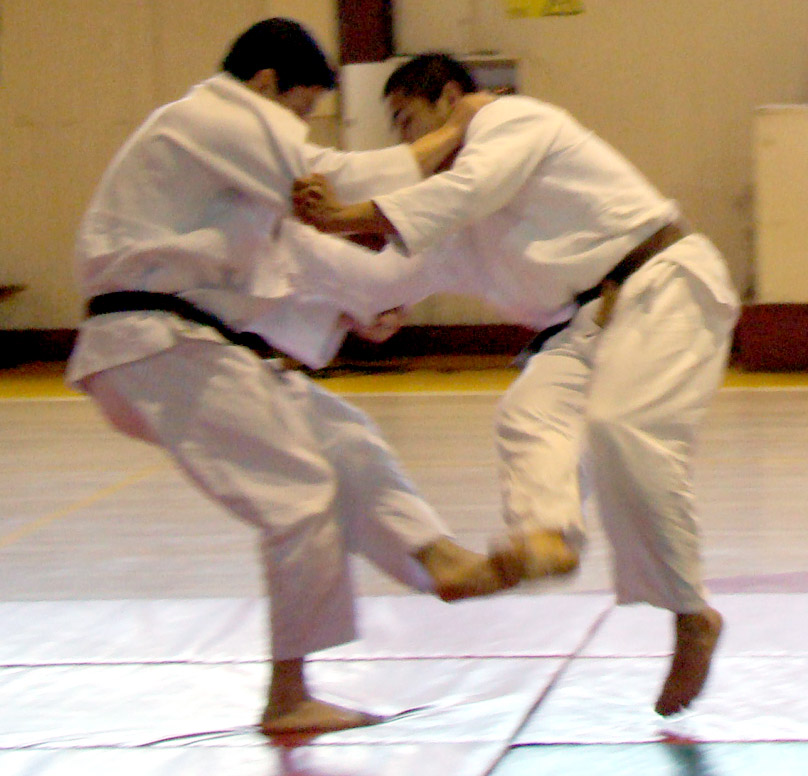
Demonstration of a foot sweep in judo. The attacker on the left is sweeping the right foot of the opponent

The foot sweep (also footsweep) is a move in many different styles of martial arts. It refers to the use of any part of the foot or leg to trip an opponent or cause them to lose balance. Foot sweeps as an act of human aggression have likely existed worldwide since prehistory, which explains why it is prevalent in many martial arts across the world. However, the earliest documentation of foot sweeps used in self-defense, sport fighting and combat is seen in Chinese Martial arts, Judo, Jujutsu as well as Karate and Muay Thai.

== Judo ==
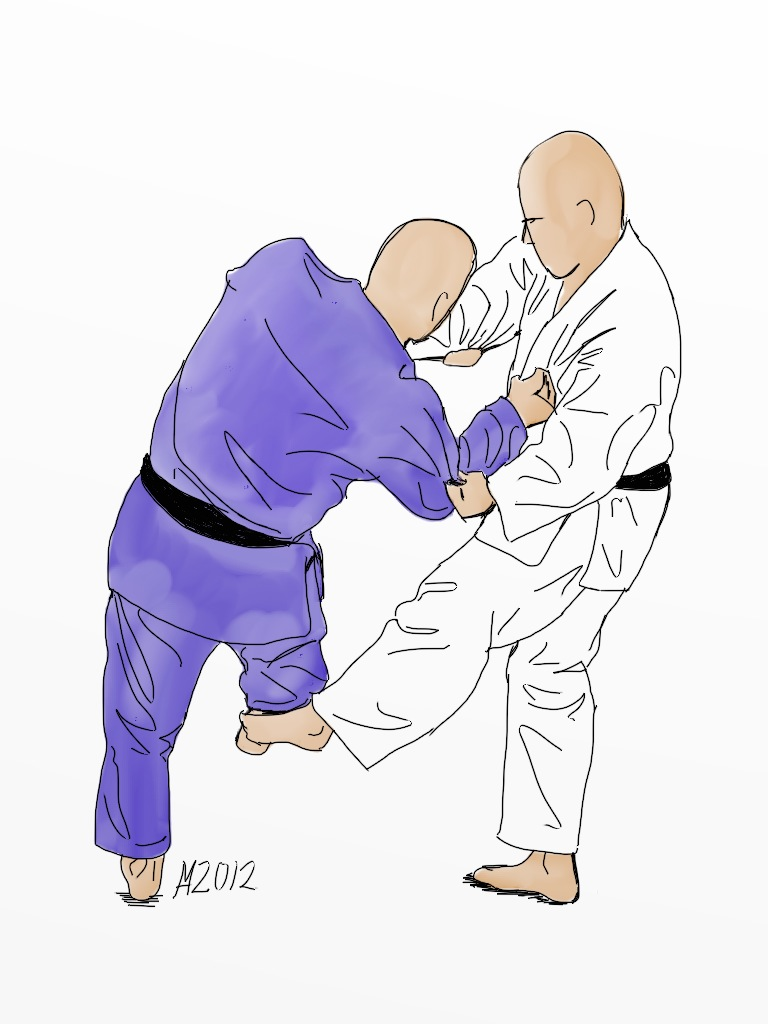
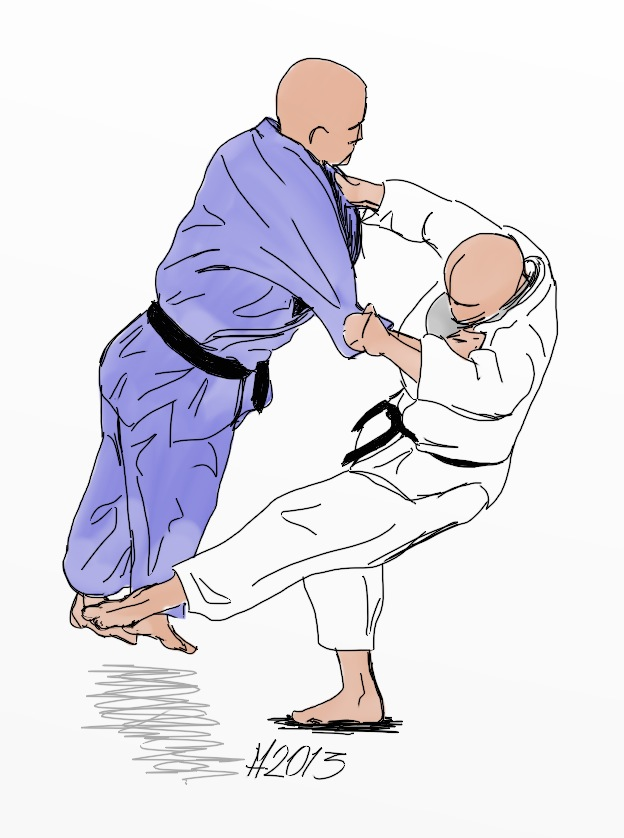
Illustrations of the judo foot sweeps de ashi barai (left) and okuri ashi barai (right)

Foot sweeps are part of Judo's ashi waza (足技). Examples of foot sweeps in judo include:

- De ashi barai
- Okuri ashi barai
- Harai tsurikomi ashi
- Ko uchi gari

== Other types ==
=== Drop sweep ===
Commonly thought of when someone hears “foot sweep,” the drop sweep involves spinning and sweeping one or two legs from a crouched position. This move is also known as the back sweep(后扫腿) in many styles of Kung-fu.

=== Single-leg sweep ===
When the opponent has one foot off the ground (usually in mid-kick) and the defender moves past this kick and sweeps out the standing leg.

=== Trap sweep ===
A variant of the single-leg sweep, this involves catching the opponent's kick with one hand and sweeping the back leg. The advantage is closer proximity and less chance of failure, but it leaves the defender open to hand attacks to the head.

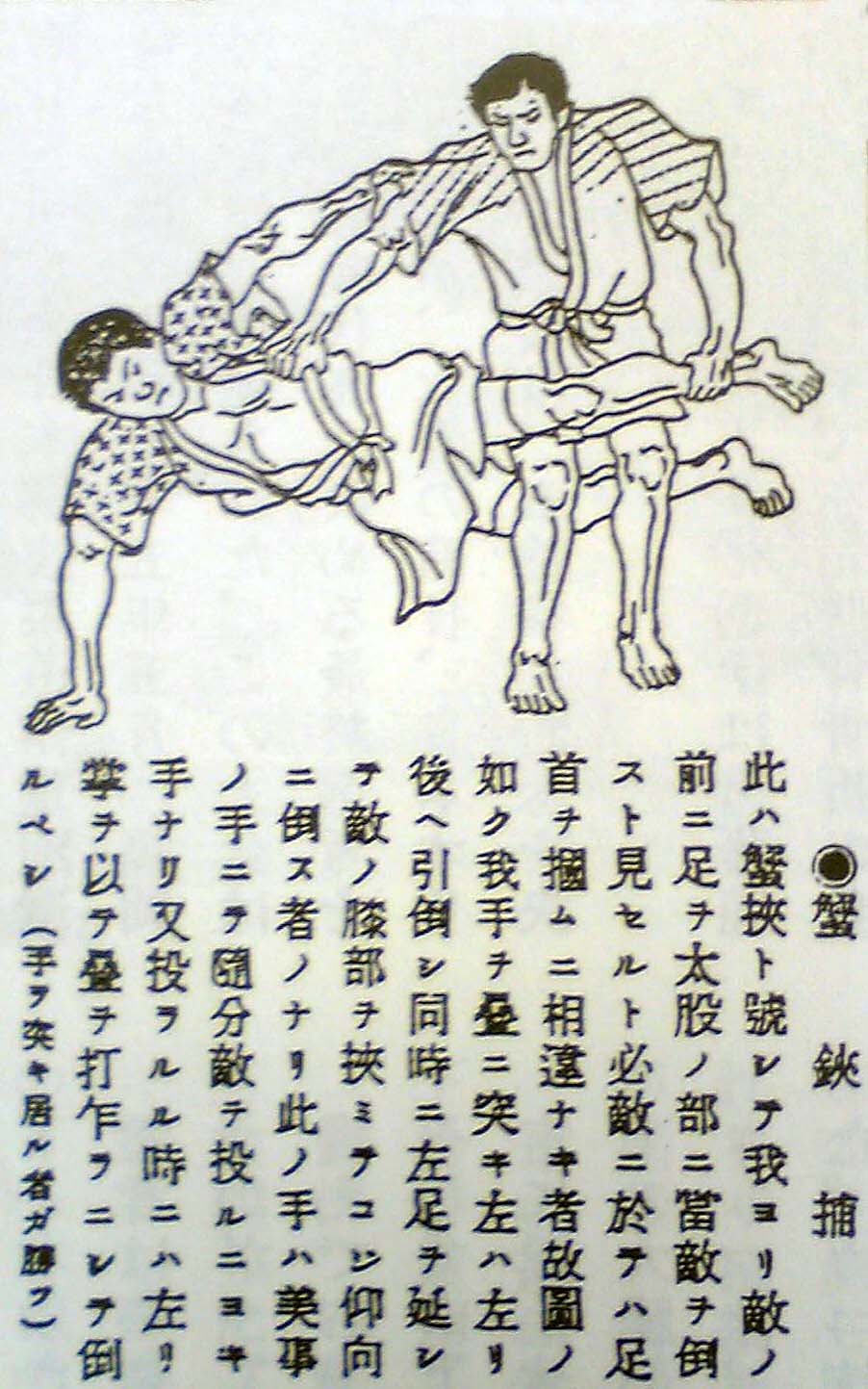
Scissor sweep, known as kani basami (蟹挟) in jujutsu and judo. This move is also seen in Chinese Dog Pugilism(Gǒuquán, 狗拳).

=== Two-leg sweep ===
When the opponent has both feet on the ground and the defender strikes behind both legs, usually accompanied by a blow across the chest to further off-balance the opponent.

=== Forward sweep ===
A sweep aimed at the front of the opponent's legs, as opposed to the more conventional behind-the-legs strike. This is considered more dangerous due to the possibility of injuring the opponent's knees or shins if the sweep is too powerful or misapplied.

=== Scissor sweep ===
The scissor sweep involves positioning one leg across the opponent's lower chest/stomach and striking behind the knee or calves with the other leg, closing the legs in a “scissor” motion. This can be done as an offensive technique, leaping into the air toward the opponent, but is more commonly used as an escape when the opponent has trapped the defender's kick across his chest.

==== Reverse scissor sweep ====
A variant of the scissor sweep, it is an offensive technique used in opposite position from a traditional scissor; that is, the higher leg strikes at the opponent's back and the lower leg scissors against the front of the opponent's knees. Like the forward sweep, this can be very dangerous due to potential injury to the opponent's knees, spine, and kidneys.

== See also ==
- Sweep (martial arts)
- Rasteira, sweep in capoeira
