= Tori (martial arts) =

Term in Japanese martial arts

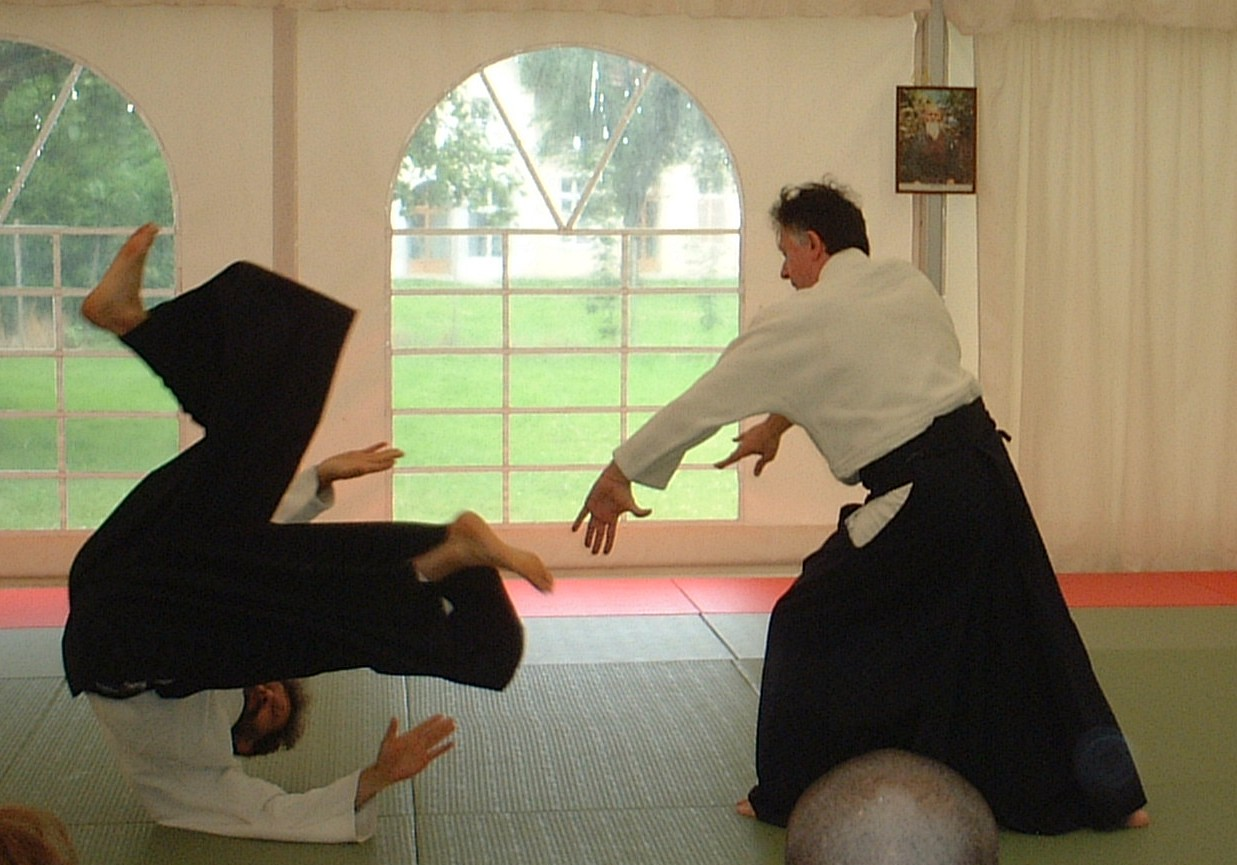
- Tori, on right, executes a throw against uke, on left.

Japanese name
- Kanji: 取り
- Hiragana: とり
Transcriptions
- Revised Hepburn: tori

Tori (取り) is a term used in Japanese martial arts to refer to the executor of a technique in partnered practice. The term "tori" comes from the verb toru (取る), meaning "to take", "to pick up", or "to choose".

In judo and some other martial arts, tori is the person who completes the technique against the training partner, called uke. Regardless of the situation, the principle is that "tori" is always the one who successfully completes a technique. The terms "tori" and "uke" are not synonymous with attacker and defender, because the role is determined by who completes a successful technique, not who initiates one.

In aikido and related martial arts, tori executes a defensive technique against a designated attack initiated by uke. Aikido has alternative terms describing the role of tori, depending on the particular style or situation, including "thrower" (投げ, nage) and "performing hand" (仕手, shite).
