= Kyuzo Mifune =

Japanese judoka (1883–1965)

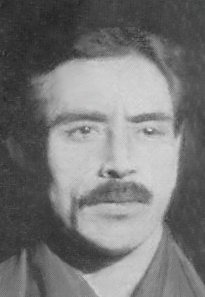
- K. Mifune

Personal information
- Native name: 三船 久蔵
- Born: April 21, 1883 Iwate Prefecture, Japan
- Died: January 27, 1965 (aged 81) Tokyo, Japan
- Occupation: Judoka

Sport
- Sport: Judo
- Rank: 10th dan black belt
- Coached by: Kanō Jigorō

Kyuzo Mifune (三船 久蔵, Mifune Kyūzō; April 21, 1883 – January 27, 1965) was a Japanese judoka and one of the greatest exponents of the art of judo after the founder, Kanō Jigorō. He is considered by many to be the greatest judo technician ever, after Kanō.

== Early life ==
Mifune was born on April 21, 1883, in Kuji City, Iwate Prefecture, on Honshū Island in Japan, a year after the Kodokan was founded. He was reportedly incorrigible as a boy, always performing some mischief or organizing others in a similar pursuit. When Mifune was 13 years old, his father, a strict disciplinarian who finally gave up on the youngest of his seven children, sent the boy to a junior high school at Sendai, in northern Japan. There, the young Mifune discovered judo, and decided to dedicate himself to it. At age 14, he defeated nine opponents in a row at one tournament with another high school. At the end of his time in Sendai, in 1903, he faced veteran master Matsugoro Okuda in a sparring match in his dojo. Okuda won easily, but he praised Mifune's skills highly and predicted he would become a legend of the art.

After graduating, Mifune was sent to a Tokyo preparatory school, anticipating entry into Waseda University. He immediately attempted to join the Kodokan. In those days, this required a personal interview with Kano, upon the recommendation of ranking judoka, and then signing a blood oath. Mifune did not know anyone at the Kodokan, but picked out Sakujiro Yokoyama, who then had a fearsome reputation, as 'Demon Yokoyama,' whose fast, powerful judo had gained much reputation for the Kodokan. Mifune camped at Yokoyama's doorstep until the latter consented to recommend him to Kano. In July 1903, Mifune joined the Kodokan, and the next year he joined Waseda University too. However his father, finding out he was spending more time at judo than studying, cut off his allowance, and Mifune, now 22, went out to find work. He began a newspaper, sold advertising, and built it into a thriving enterprise. He was able to sell it at a substantial profit, and entered the economics program at Keio University.

== Career ==
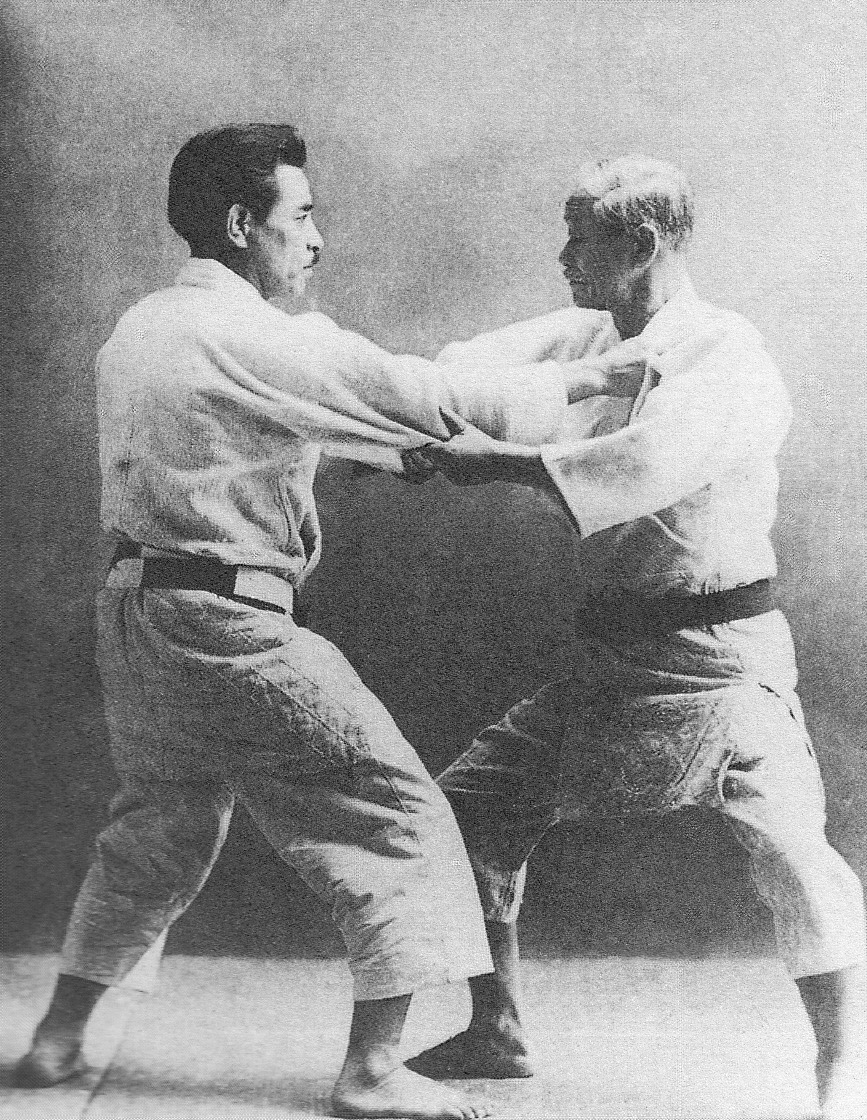
Mifune (left) in training with Kanō

After 15 months of training, Mifune achieved the rank of shodan ("beginning dan", indicating 1st dan ranking) in Kodokan judo, and after the remarkably short time of four more months, nidan (2nd dan). Through timing and speed, Mifune quickly gained a reputation, and was never defeated at the annual Red and White Kodokan tournament. By 1910, he was ranked godan (5th dan) and an instructor. He was already being called the "God of Judo". He was 30. His father recommended a girl in his hometown and, for only the second time since he had left home, he returned, to marry.

During the next 20 years, Mifune's reputation continued to grow. He became 6th dan (rokudan) in 1917 and 7th dan (shichidan) in 1923. When he was 40, he was challenged by a 6 foot tall and 240 lb. sumo wrestler. Mifune, 5 feet 2 inches tall and 145 lb., finally slammed the wrestler with his trademark "airplane" throw (kuki nage or sumi otoshi). He ate sparingly, slept on a Western-style bed, and did not smoke. In 1931, Kano promoted Mifune to 8th dan (hachidan) and in 1937, to the rank of kudan (9th dan).

With Kano's death in 1938, Mifune became the most influential instructor. Students had long complained that Mifune would get carried away with lectures, and he was "feared more than loved." On May 25, 1945, he was promoted to judan (10th dan), the fourth of 15 judoka to ever be so honored. Mifune was given the title of Hanshi then Meijin by the International Martial Arts Federation (IMAF) and in 1956, he wrote his classic book, The Canon of Judo, still a remarkable exposition of judo history, philosophy, and technical description. To E. J. Harrison, he wrote a book foreword that was simple but expressed Mifune's philosophical nature: "Freedom in continuous change!"

Trevor Leggett, a frequent visitor to the Kodokan over many years, remarked that judo was much "rougher" at the Kodokan prior to World War II than afterward; this was, perhaps, the influence of Mifune.

== Awards and honors ==
In 1964, Mifune was awarded the Order of the Rising Sun (3rd Class).

== Death ==
Mifune died on January 27, 1965, of throat cancer, in the Nichidai University Hospital in Tokyo.

== Anecdotes ==
In his book The Fighting Spirit of Japan (published in 1913), E.J. Harrison writes about an anecdote as told to him by Sakujiro Yokoyama:

I remember during the early part of January, 1909, I went to a certain restaurant, accompanied by Mr. Kyuzo Mifune, a fifth Dan teacher of the Kodokan. We noticed in one corner of the room a group of thirteen young fellows drinking sake, while in an adjoining apartment there were an elderly couple and some other visitors taking food. The members of the first-named group were seen to be putting their heads together at frequent intervals and to be busily whispering, at the same time casting glances in our direction. I did not take any special notice of what was going on, nor did I suspect that they had any designs upon us. Mr. Mifune and I went on chatting over our drinks. Presently one of the rascals approached us, calmly picked up my overcoat and hat, and tried to make off with them under our very noses. Of course I remonstrated, when the thief, evidently bent on picking a quarrel, insisted that the coat and hat were his property. A warm altercation arose, in the midst of which he assumed a threatening attitude, and was speedily joined by half a dozen of his comrades from the other side of the room. There being no alternative, Mr. Mifune took a hand in the game. He avoided unnecessary roughness, but in less than a minute he had them all down with a succession of swift blows. Then the rest of the gang set upon me, but I knocked them down one after the other, and the affair was over in less than three minutes. As our victims regained consciousness they lost no time in making themselves scarce, but we detained one of them, and forced him to confess. He admitted that their object had been to extort money from us by intimidation. They had been misled by our good clothes and had imagined that we would be easy prey. We let the fellow go instead of handing him over to the police, as we considered he had received punishment enough at our hands. After the rascals had gone the old couple who had been interested spectators of the occurrence told us that they had just witnessed for the first time in their lives a practical display of jujutsu and were amazed at the wonderful feats which experts were able to perform against such odds.

== See also ==
- The Canon of Judo
