= The Canon of Judo =

Book by Kyuzo Mifune

- First English edition
- Author: Kyuzo Mifune
- Translator: Francoise White
- Language: English
- Genre: Martial Arts
- Publisher: Seibuno Shinkosha
- Publication date: 1956
- Media type: Print (Hardcover)
- Pages: 224
- ISBN: 4-7700-2979-9 (1st edition, hardcover)
- OCLC: 56015517
- Preceded by: Canon of Judo

The Canon of Judo is a book that was originally published in 1956, and written by Kodokan 10th dan, Kyuzo Mifune (1883–1965). The book covers almost all of the Kodokan recognized techniques, adds variations and new techniques, including Do-Jime in passing as well. The book also describes fifteen Kata developed by Mifune to teach adaptation through reversal and counters. The book organizes the techniques differently from the official Kodokan Gokyo.

This book is based on new and revised material by the author made between the original publish date and the authors death. The original book, "Canon of Judo", does not contain this information. Furthermore, the original book was translated by K. Sugai whose translations were poor at best. (For example, "Or this is to throw him down by foot sweeping instant before his advanced-feet are fixed in order to change his position or break your balance.")

== Subjects covered ==
The book gives a brief history of Jujutsu in Japan, and gives the lineage of Judo, referencing Jujutsu masters prior to Jigoro Kano. To show the early origins and continuous development of the martial arts in Japan, a long list of historical text sources, people, and schools and styles are mentioned.

In the book, Kyuzo Mifune explains his metaphysical view of Judo, its role in Japanese society (and the world), and benefits to the individual player. He notes that Judo initially only included throws, and explains the difference between Judo and Ju-jutsu. He discusses the role of competition in Judo, and the purpose of free practice, randori, and explains that it is an indispensable part of the sport.

Although the book mentions the five kata,

1. Nage (Throwing Forms)
2. Kime (Forms of Decision)
3. Katame (Grappling Forms)
4. Ju (Forms of Gentleness)
5. Koshiki (Ancient Forms)

it does not cover them.

Furthermore, it does not cover Atemi-waza, but states that Atemi-waza include strikes, kicks, hits, and attacks using the fist, foot, elbow, kneecap, side of the palm, shoulder, or head, to attack the opponents vital points.

Lastly before going into each technique in detail, the book covers some basic concepts of techniques, such as Tai-sabaki (body control) and Hen-nou (adaptability). It can be surmised that throwing techniques have at least three phases:

1. Kuzushi, balance breaking
2. Tsukuri, positioning
3. Kake, execution
