= List of public art in Tokyo =

List of public artworks in Tokyo, Japan

Public artworks in Tokyo, Japan, include:

Statue	Image	Sculptor	Location	Coordinates	Notes
Flame of Freedom		Marc Couturier	Tokyo, Japan	35.624160°N 139.773944°E	
Godzilla head			Shinjuku, Tokyo	35.695034°N 139.701909°E	
Growing Gardener		Inges Idee			
Maman		Louise Bourgeois	Roppongi Hills, Tokyo		
Ni-Tele Really Big Clock		Hayao Miyazaki			
Statue of Hachikō		Teru Andō (original) Takeshi Andō			
Statue of Inoue Masaru					
Statue of Kanō Jigorō, Bunkyō				35°42′28.8″N 139°45′12.6″E	
Statue of Kanō Jigorō, Shinjuku					
Statue of Pierre de Coubertin					
Statue of Shinran					
Statue of Umashimadenomikoto					
Statue of Unicorn Gundam			Odaiba, Tokyo		
Statue of Yasuhito, Prince Chichibu					
Tokyo Brushstroke I and II		Roy Lichtenstein			
