= Statue of Kanō Jigorō, Tokyo =

Statue of Kanō Jigorō, Tokyo may refer to:

- Statue of Kanō Jigorō, Bunkyō
- Statue of Kanō Jigorō, Shinjuku
