= Canada Place =

Building in Vancouver, British Columbia, Canada

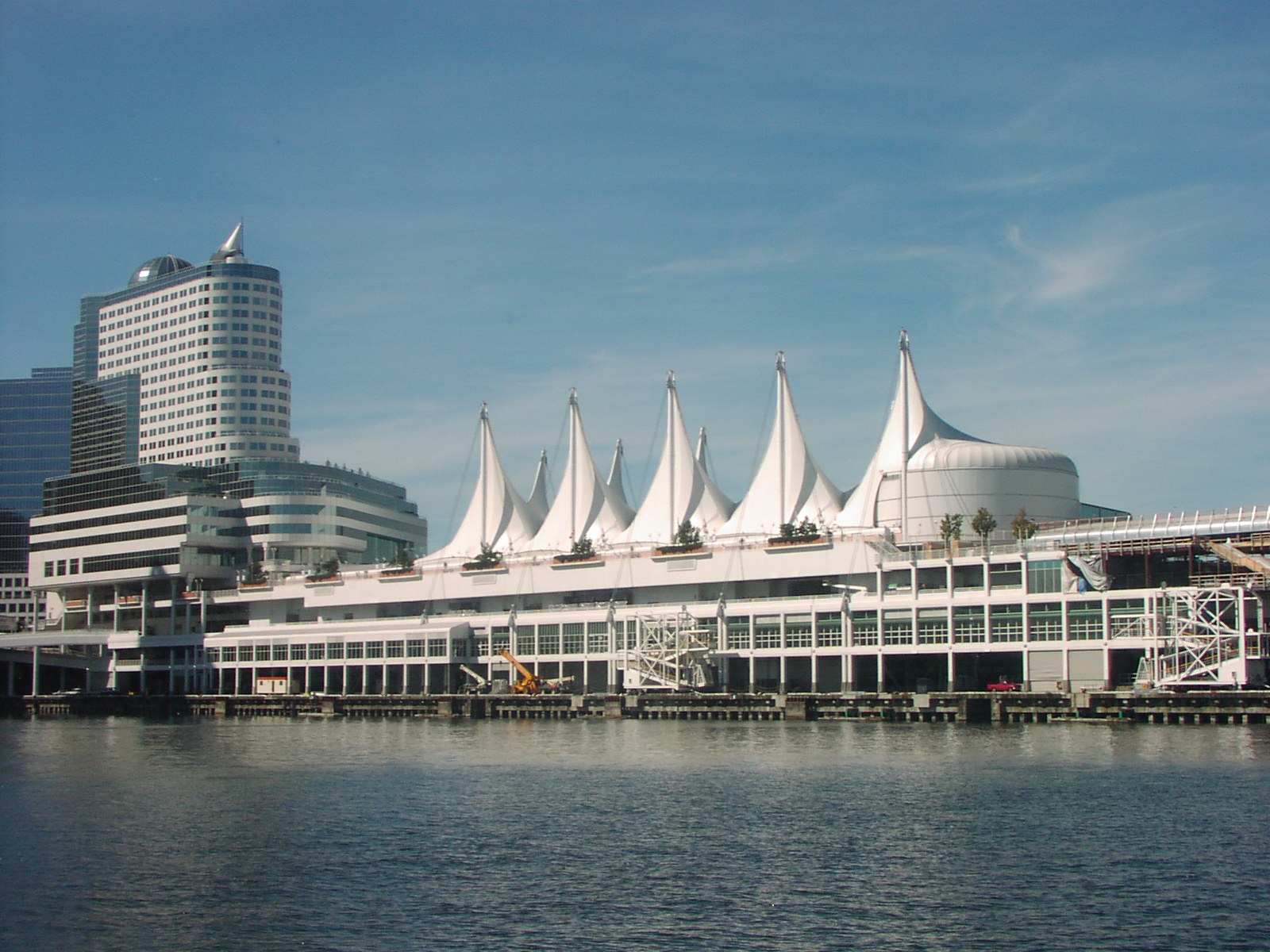

General information
- Status: Completed
- Type: Convention center; Cruise ship terminal
- Location: 999 Canada Place; Vancouver, British Columbia; V6C 3T4, Canada
- Coordinates: 49.288635°N 123.111119°W
- Current tenants: Vancouver Convention Centre; Pan Pacific Vancouver Hotel; Vancouver World Trade Centre
- Construction started: March 9, 1983
- Completed: December 1985
- Opened: May 2, 1986
- Renovated: 2011
- Cost: CA$400 million
- Renovation cost: CA$21 million
- Owner: Port Metro Vancouver

Height
- Height: 81.5 metres (267 ft)

Technical details
- Floor count: 23

Design and construction
- Architect: Eberhard Zeidler / Barry Downs
- Architecture firm: Joint venture: Zeidler Roberts Partnership, MCMP & DA Architects + Planners
- Structural engineer: Geiger Engineers

Renovating team
- Renovating firm: Ledcor Group of Companies

Website
- www.canadaplace.ca

Canada Place is a building situated on the Burrard Inlet in Vancouver, British Columbia, Canada. It is home to the Vancouver Convention Centre East Building, the Pan Pacific Vancouver Hotel, the Vancouver World Trade Centre, and the virtual flight experience Flyover in Vancouver. The building's exterior is covered by fabric roofs resembling sails. It is also the main cruise ship passenger terminal for the region, where cruises to Alaska originate. The building was designed by architects Zeidler Roberts Partnership in joint venture with Musson Cattell Mackey Partnership and DA Architects + Planners.

Canada Place is accessed via West Cordova Street and near Waterfront Station, a major transit hub with connections to SkyTrain, SeaBus, and the West Coast Express.

The structure was expanded in 2001 to accommodate another cruise ship berth. During the 2010 Winter Olympics, Canada Place served as the Main Press Centre.

== History ==
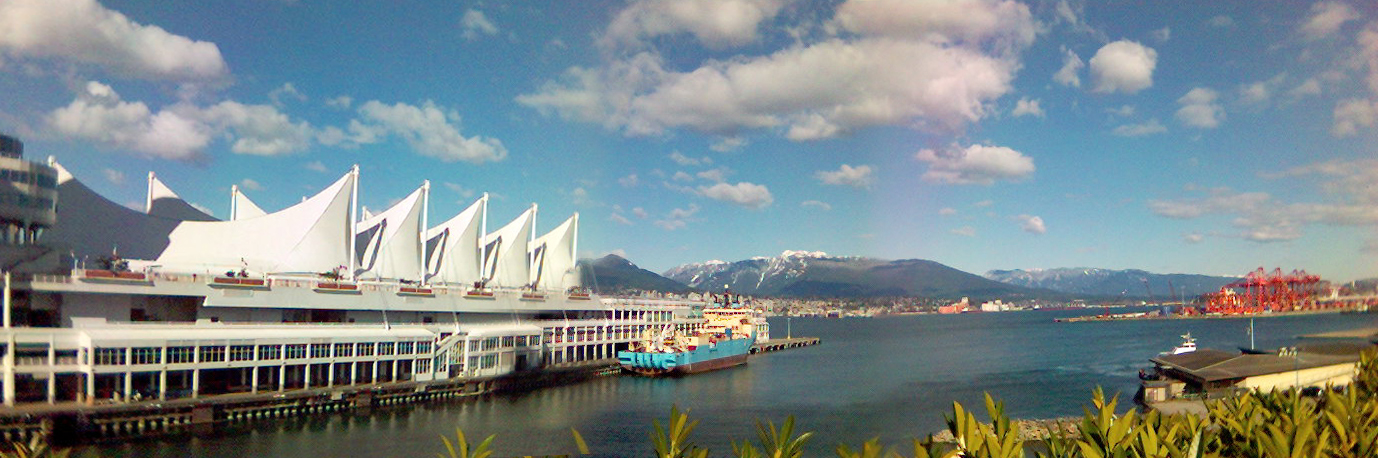
Panorama view of Canada Place's sails with the North Shore in the background

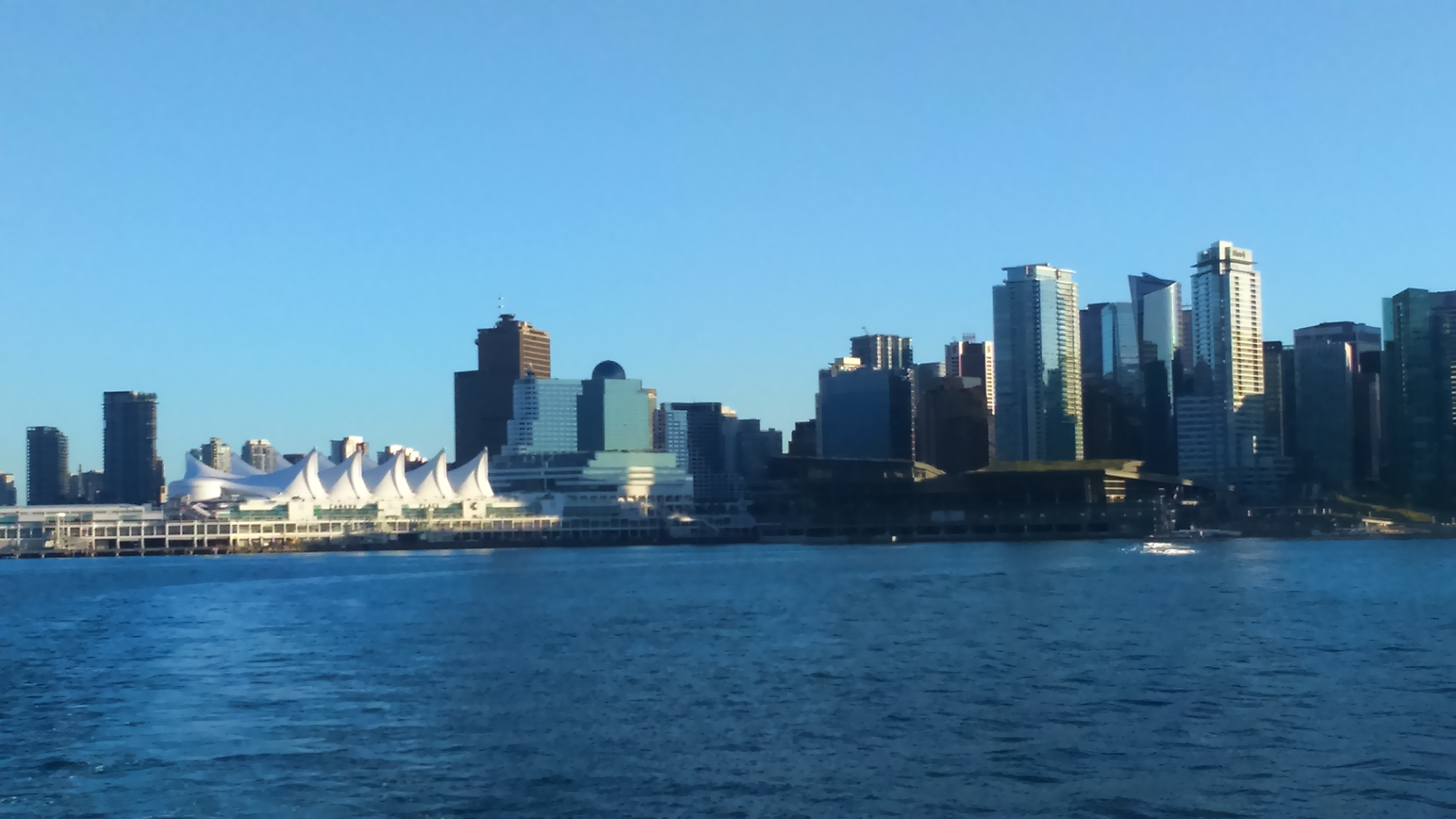
Canada Place with Downtown Vancouver

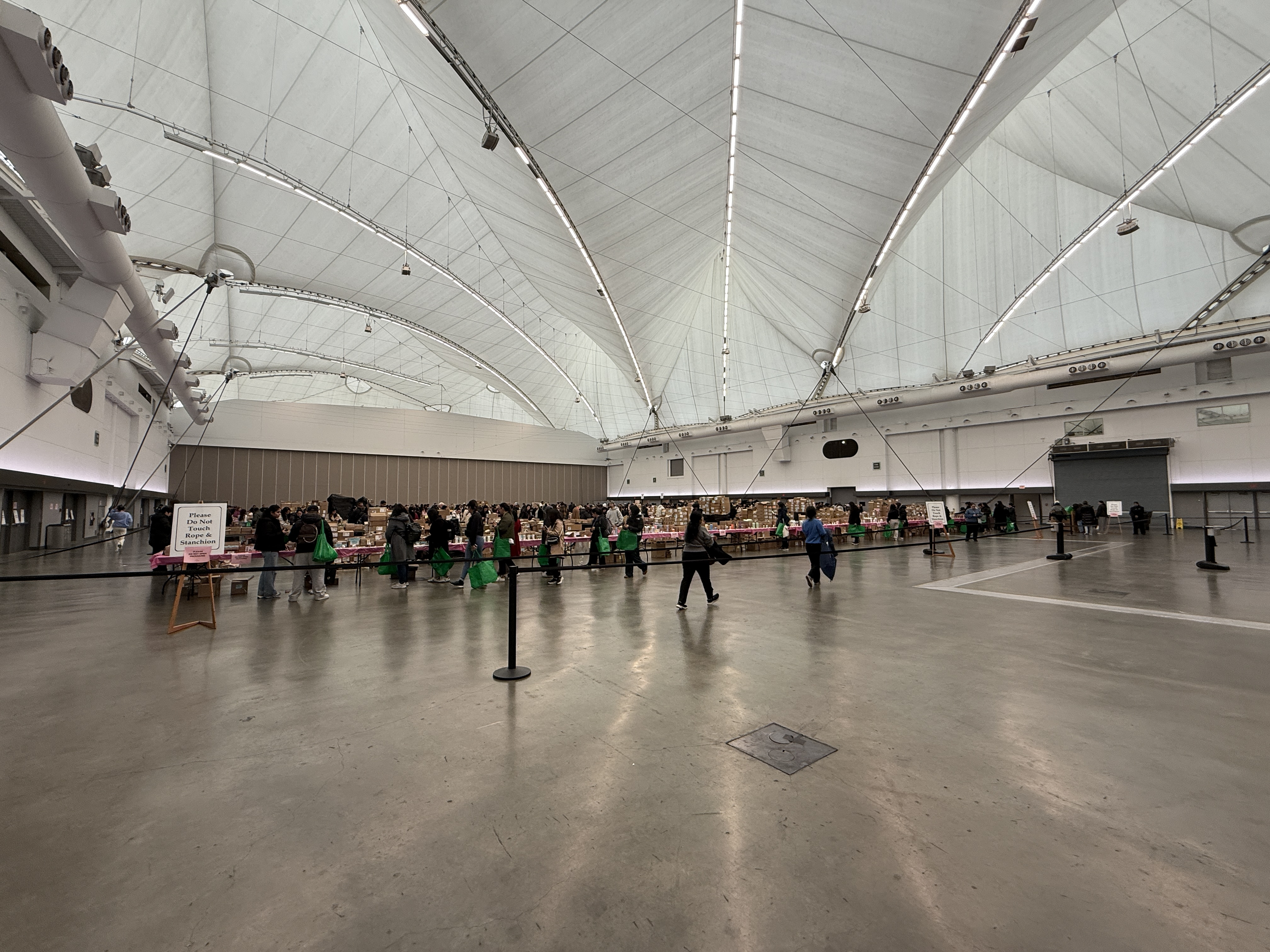
Exhibiton hall in Canada Place

Canada Place was built on the land which was originally the Canadian Pacific Railway's Pier B–C. Built in 1927, its primary purpose was to serve CPR and other shipping lines trading across the Pacific Ocean.

In 1978, federal, provincial and municipal levels of government began planning for the development of convention, cruise ship and hotel facilities. Four years later, the Government of Canada created a crown corporation, the Canada Harbour Place Corporation (known as Canada Place Corporation until 2012), to develop the Canada Place project on the Pier B–C site. Construction began when Queen Elizabeth II arrived on the Royal Yacht Britannia with Pierre Trudeau, Prime Minister of Canada, and William R. Bennett, Premier of British Columbia, to initiate the first concrete pour.

During Expo 86, the Canada Pavilion at Canada Place was opened by Prince Charles and Prime Minister Brian Mulroney. Among the largest and most elaborate pavilions presented by any nation at any World's Fair, the Canada Pavilion hosted more than 5 million visitors prior to the October 13, 1986, closing date.

Canada Place Corporation (CPC), a Crown agent, continues to act as the coordinating landlord for Canada Place facilities.

=== Events ===
Throughout the year many community events are held at and hosted by Canada Place.

== Pan Pacific Vancouver ==
The Pan Pacific Vancouver opened in January 1986 and has 503 rooms and suites, two restaurants, and a lounge.

The hotel is operated by Pan Pacific Hotels and Resorts.

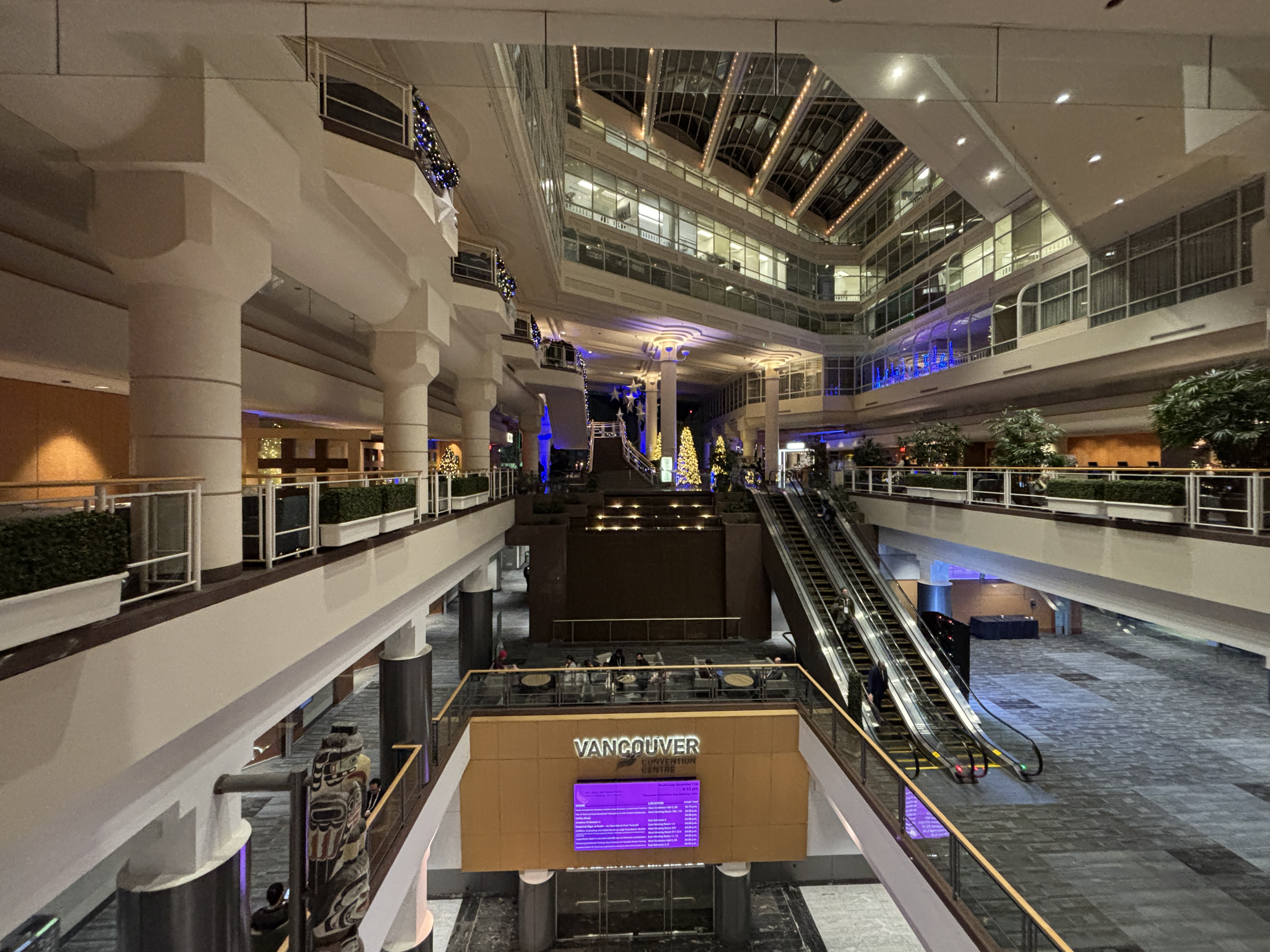
Canada Place Atrium

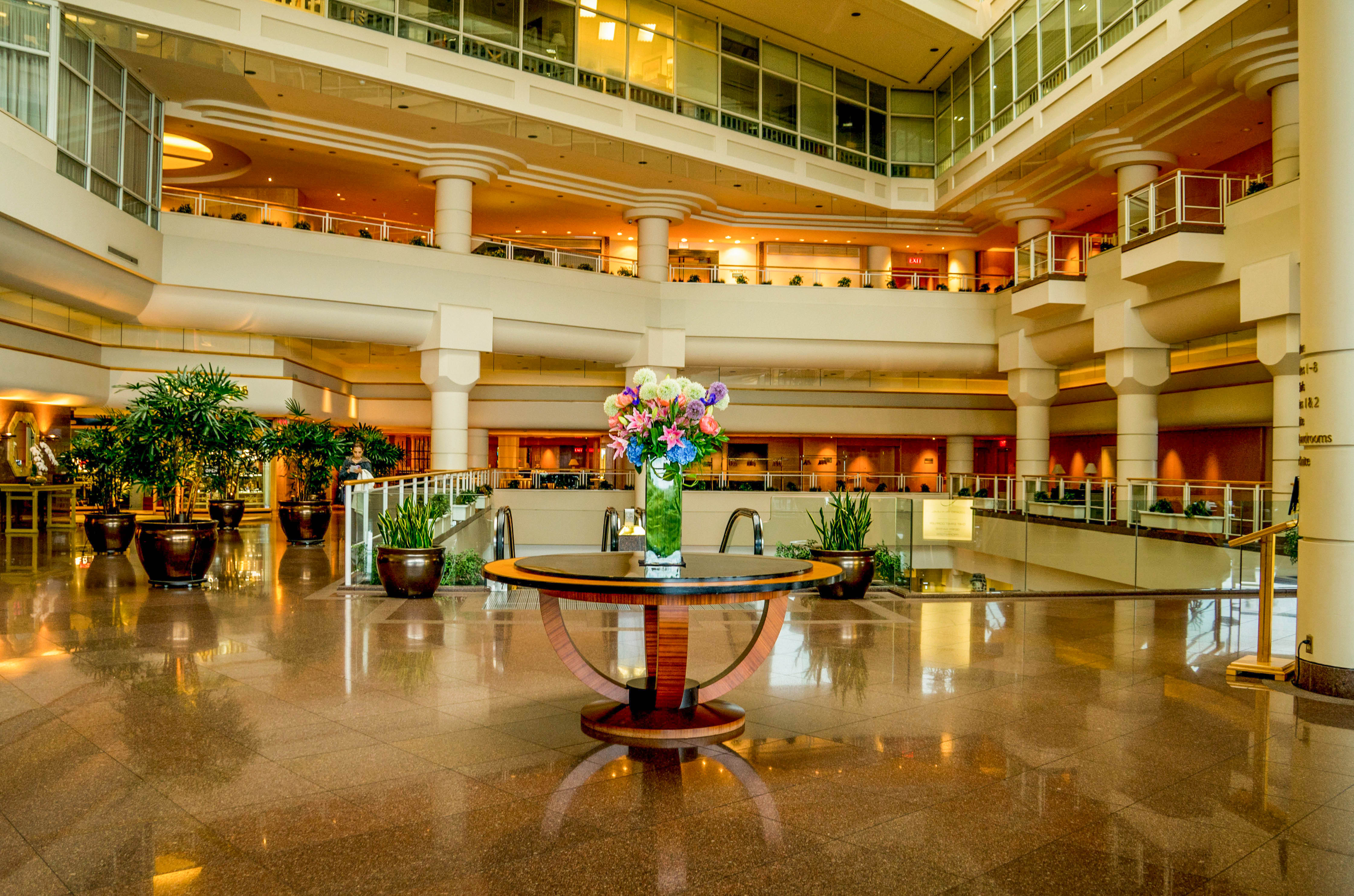
Pan Pacific Vancouver lobby

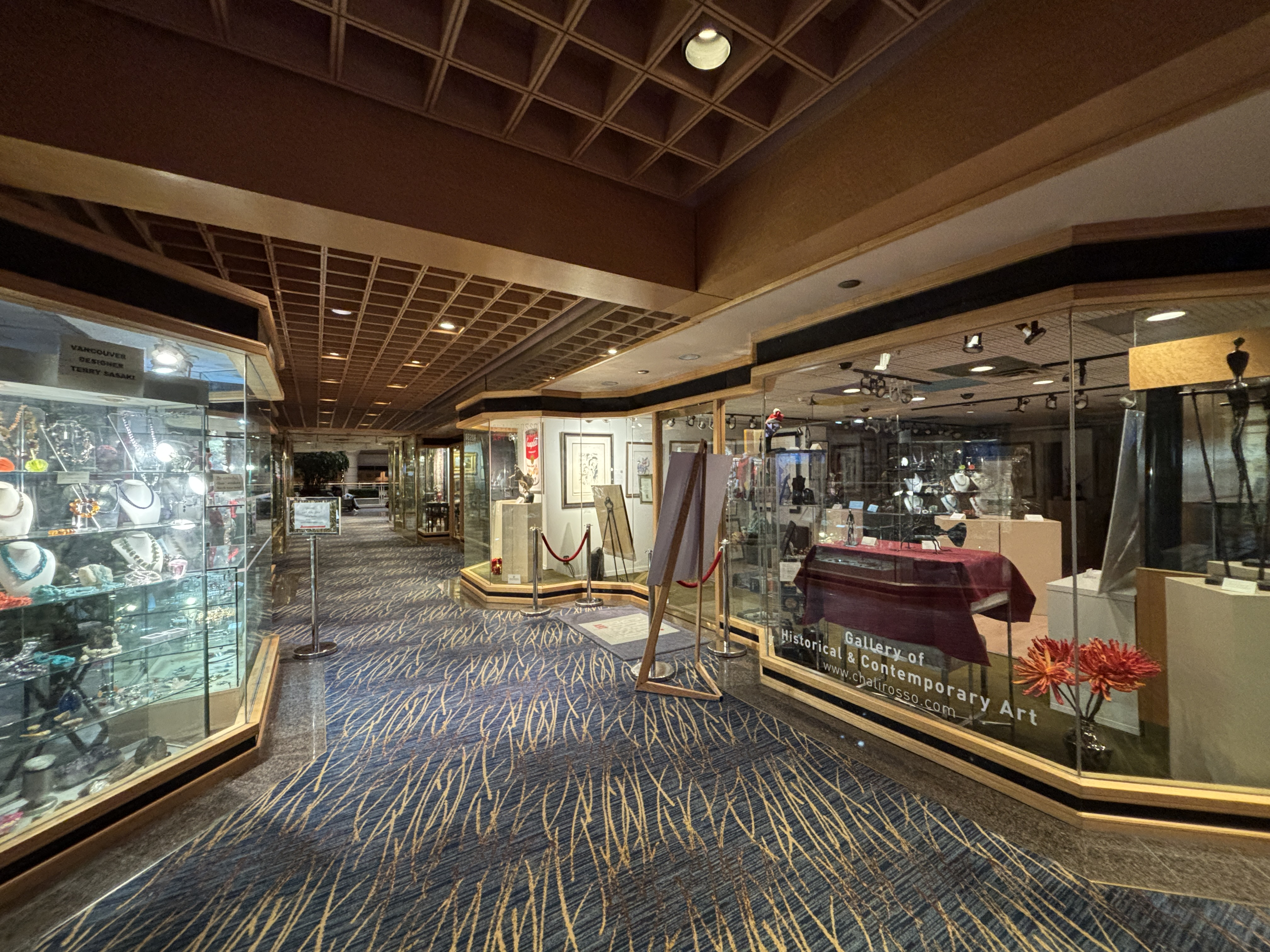
Pan Pacific Vancouver Arcade

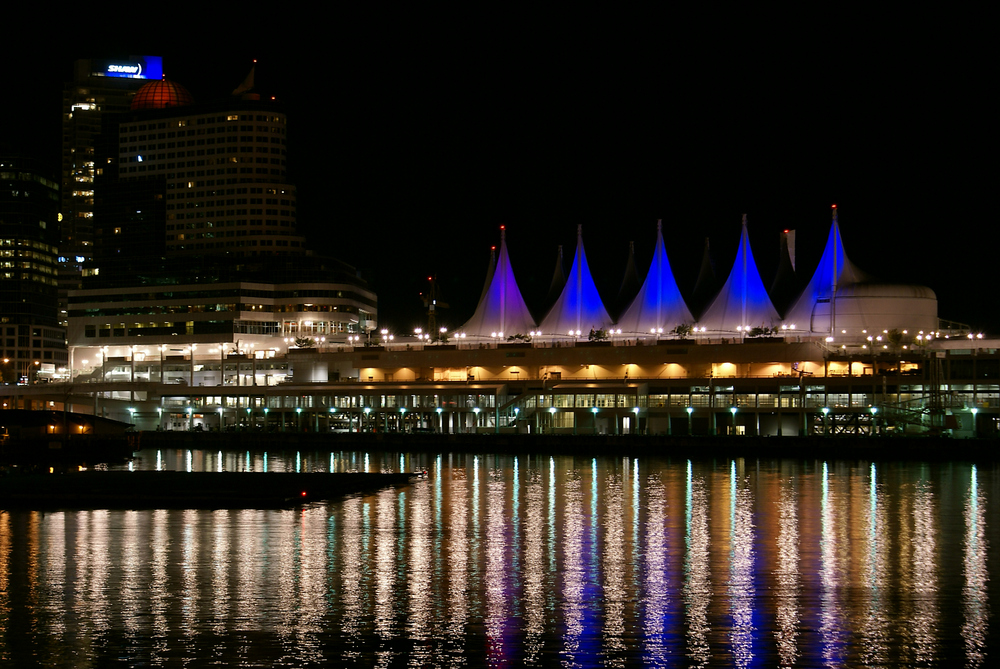
Canada Place, night view

== Heritage Horns ==
Touch "play" to hear horns

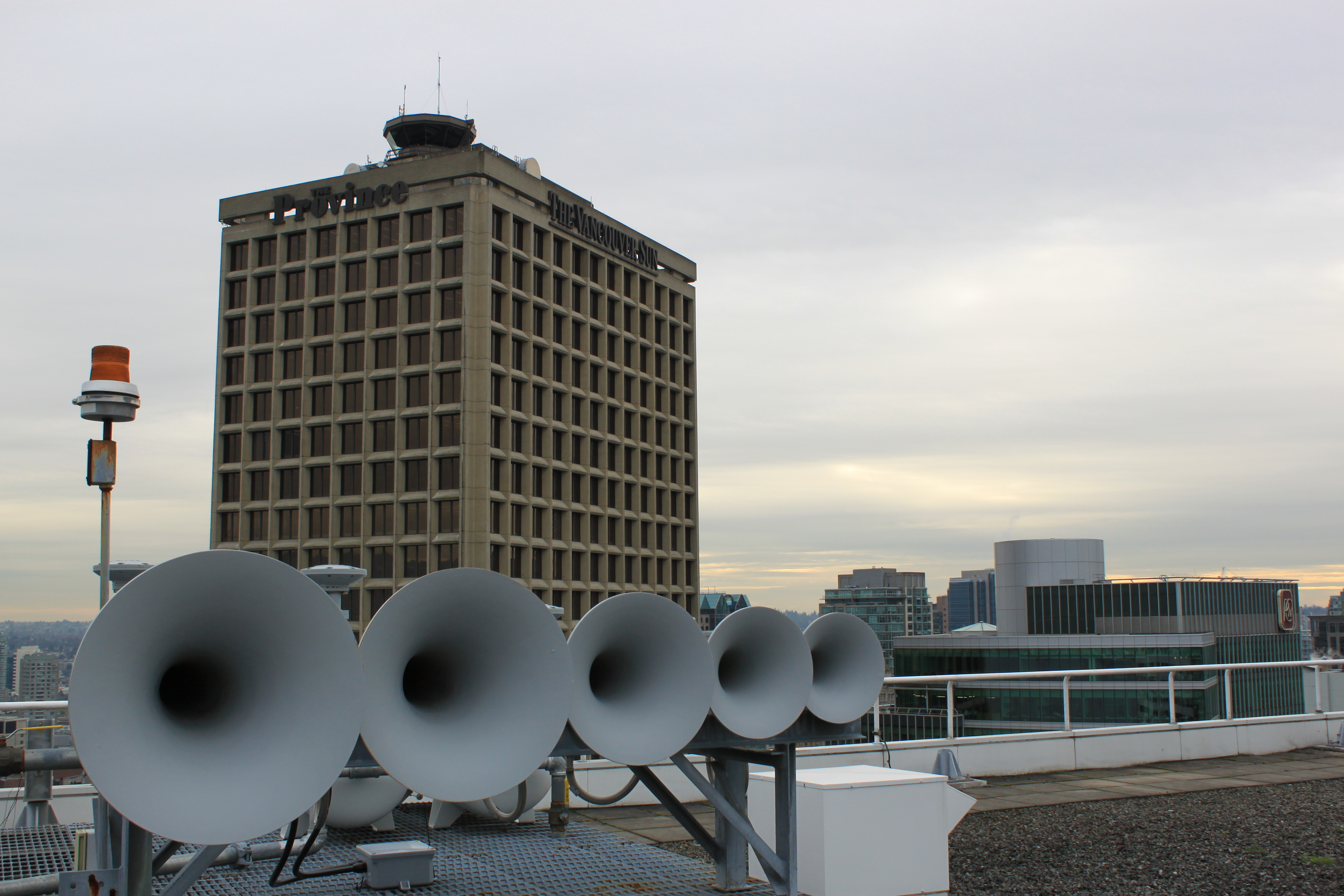
The north five of the ten Heritage Horns

The Heritage Horns, formerly known as the 12 O'clock Horn, sound the first four notes of O Canada every day at noon and can be heard throughout Downtown Vancouver and beyond. The ten horns have five facing north and five facing east on the roof of the Pan Pacific hotel and have an output of 115 decibels. They were originally on the roof of the BC Electric building (now the Electra) and were silent when the headquarters was converted to condominiums in the early 1990s. The horns started sounding again on November 8, 1994, after being acquired, refurbished, and relocated to Canada Place. Due to complaints, the timer was changed from mechanical to electrical soon after to make them accurate. They sounded 26 times during the 2010 Olympics, once for each medal won by Canada. The first was at 7:30pm on February 13 for a silver won by Jennifer Heil. The Heritage Horns were also sounding at 7:00 p.m. each evening from March 26 to April 16, 2020, in support of essential service workers across Canada during the early days of the COVID-19 pandemic.

== See also ==
- Ballantyne Pier — overflow cruise ship terminal in Vancouver
- The Drop (sculpture)
- Expo 86
