= Dream Bridge =

Bridge in Tokyo, Japan

Dream Bridge 夢の大橋 (Yume-no-ōhashi)
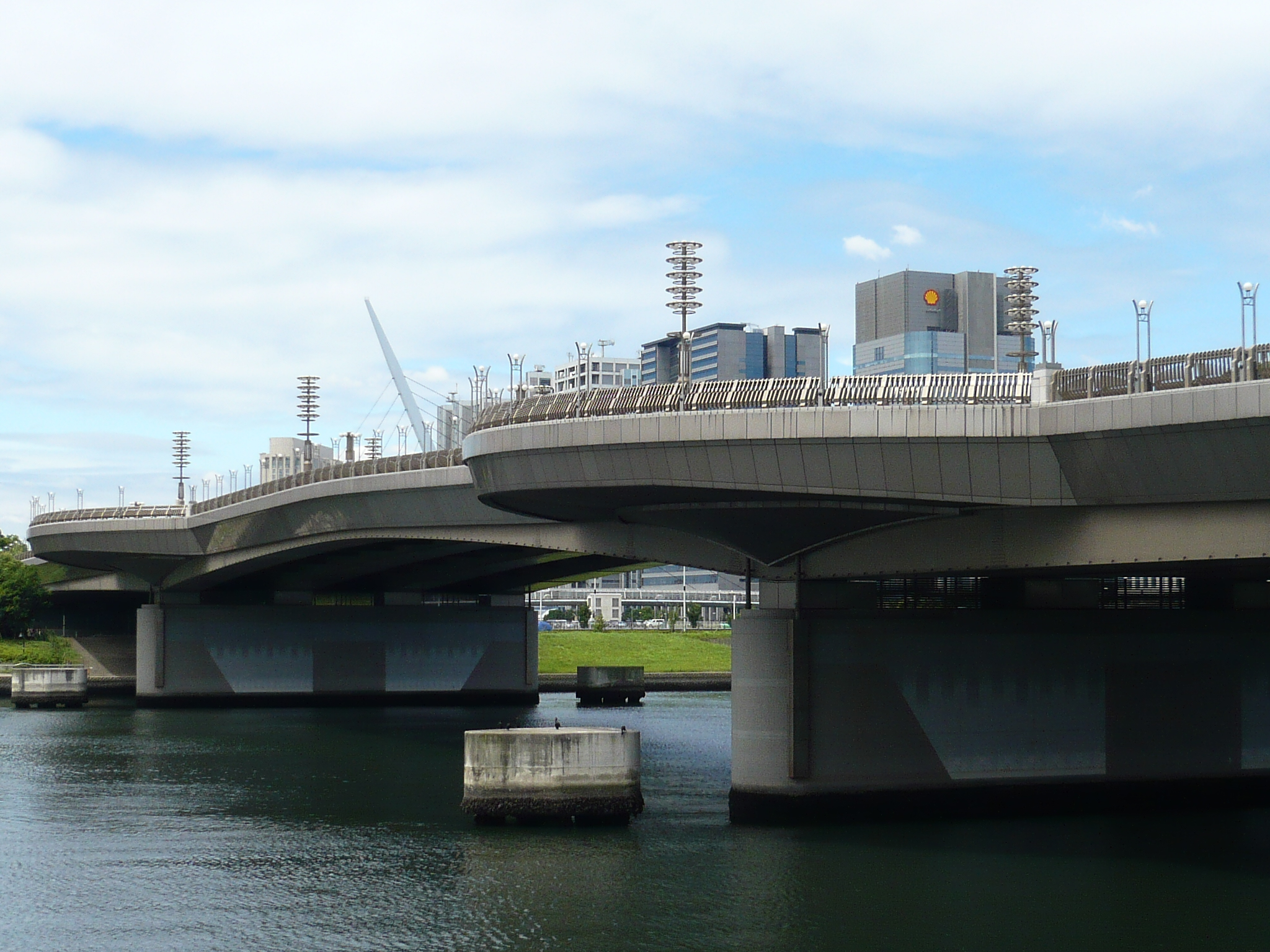
- The bridge, 2007
- Coordinates: 35°37′44″N 139°47′04″E
- Locale: Odaiba, Tokyo, Japan

Location
- Interactive map of Dream Bridge

The Dream Bridge (Japanese: 夢の大橋 Yume-no-ōhashi) is a bridge in Odaiba, Tokyo, Japan. It crosses the Ariake West Canal within the Symbol Promenade Park, and is only open to pedestrian and bicycle traffic. It was the location of the 2020 Summer Olympics cauldron in 2021.

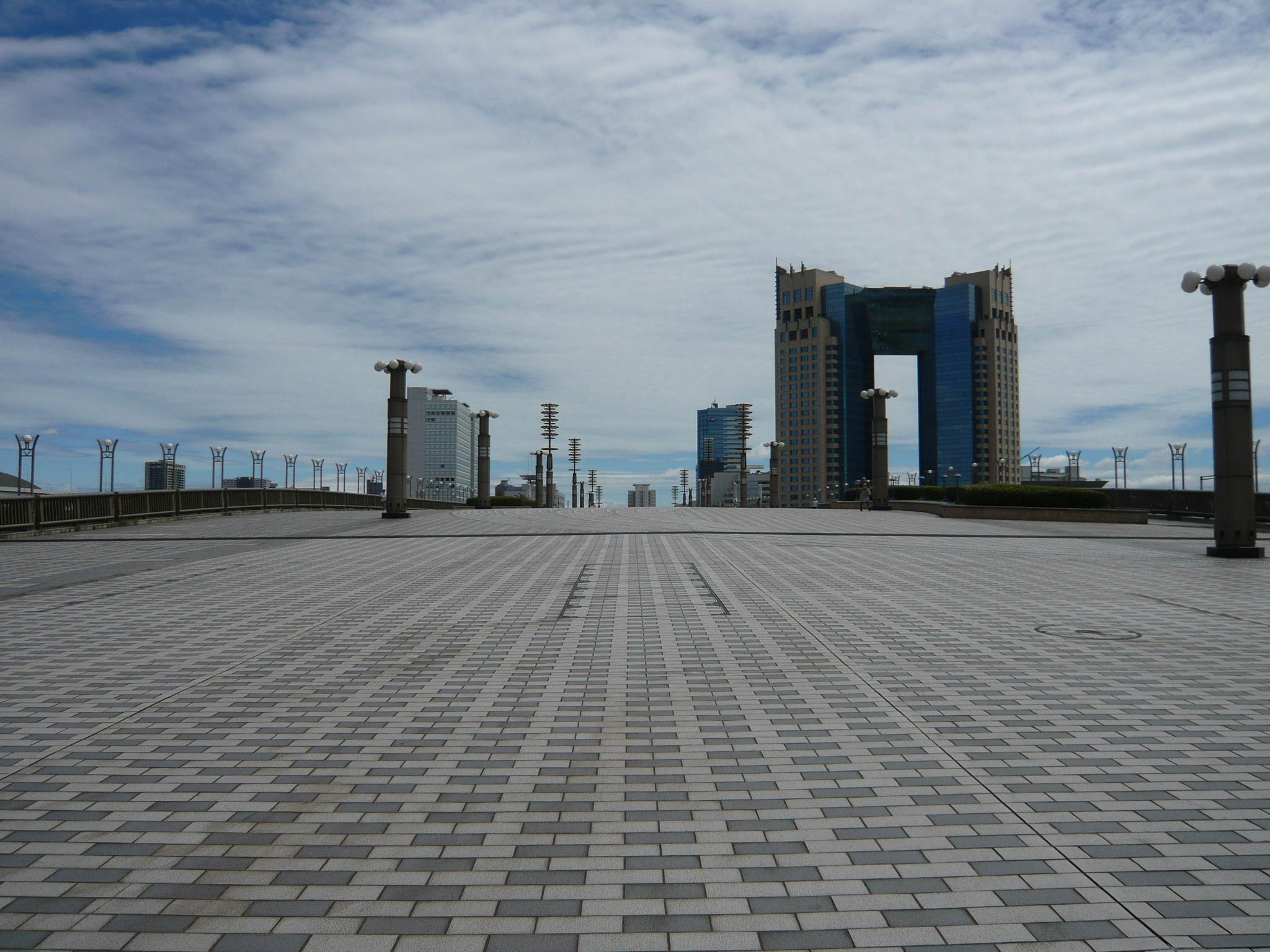
The bridge in 2007
