= Japan Sport Olympic Square =

Building in Tokyo, Japan

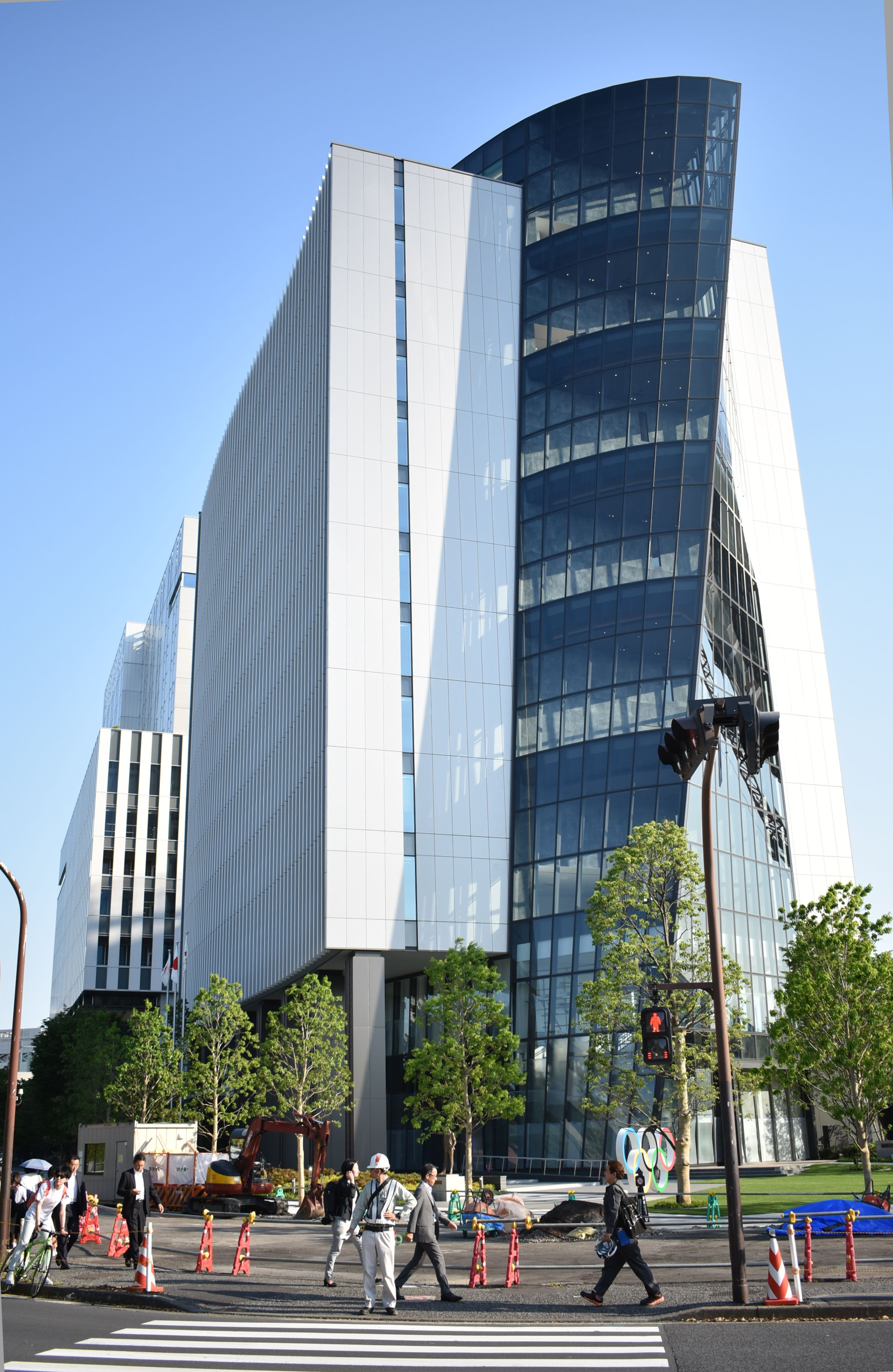
- The building's exterior in 2019
- Interactive map of the Japan Sport Olympic Square area

General information
- Type: Administrative center for the 2020 Summer Olympics
- Location: Tokyo, Japan
- Coordinates: 35.67514°N 139.71517°E
- Current tenants: Japan Olympic Museum

Japan Sport Olympic Square is a building in Tokyo, Japan, which served as an administrative center for the 2020 Summer Olympics. The first two floors house the Japan Olympic Museum, which opened in September 2019.The area around Japan Sport Olympic Square was developed as Tokyo Olympic Park. Installed outside the building are bronze statues of Pierre de Coubertin and Kanō Jigorō, as well as a replica of the Olympic cauldron from the 1964 Summer Olympics (Tokyo), 1972 Winter Olympics (Sapporo), and 1998 Winter Olympics (Nagano). The Olympic symbol is also set up in Tokyo Olympic Park, making it a popular commemorative photo spot.

== See also ==
- Statue of Kanō Jigorō, Shinjuku
- Statue of Pierre de Coubertin, Tokyo
