= Kazuzo Kudo =

Japanese judoka

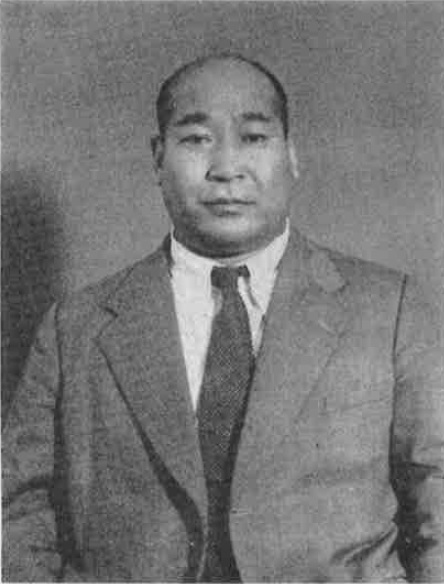
Kazuzo Kudo

Kazuzo Kudo (1898–1970) is a former Judo instructor and author. Kudo was born in 1898. Kudo reached the 9th dan in 1967. Kudo was the author of Judo books, Judo in Action Throwing Techniques, and Judo in Action Grappling Techniques. He was also the author of Dynamic Judo. By 1970, he was the sole living person to have studied under Kanō Jigorō. In the same year he served as the director of the Kodokan Judo Institute. He died in 1970.
