= Takemaru Wakaki =

Japanese bodybuilder

- Born: January 20, 1911; Tokyo, Japan
- Died: January 3, 2000 (aged 89); Tokyo, Japan
- Other names: The Monster of Showa, the Lion of Kanda

Takemaru Wakaki (若木竹丸, Wakaki Takemaru; January 20, 1911 – January 3, 2000) was a Japanese bodybuilder and boxer. Nicknamed the "Monster of Shōwa", was known as a pioneer of bodybuilding and strength training in Japan.

== Biography ==
He was born in a wealthy family, son of a policeman and a businesswoman. During his childhood he was bullied for his slim and weak built, so he started training to overcome it. He initially did exclusively calisthenics due to his lack of other options, but at the age of 17 he found Eugen Sandow's book Sandow's System of Physical Training, published in Japan by judo founder Jigoro Kano. As weights and related gear were not available in Japan until 1934, Wakaki started self-training with all the resources he could find to lift weight, such as chairs, car wheels, iron bars and concrete buckets.

His training regime caused reality to mix with legend. It was said that he trained for 15 hours per day, only rested after fainting of exhaustion and even sleep with weights on top of him to exercise every time he got up. He published his own treatise on bodybuilding in 1928, when he was already known by the nicknames of the "Monster of Showa" and the "Lion of Kanda" due to his impressive physique and strength feats.

Wakaki not only developed the field of muscle hypertrophy, as he believed it was useless to sacrifice functionality only to achieve a certain appearance. He came to be able to perform handstands over his fingers and bridges with up to five men standing on his body. His record were 228 kg in bench press and 300 kg in ground press. His biceps reached 51 cm, despite he was only 1.62m tall and weighed only 69 kg. He acted as a trainer for famous martial artists, like judoka Masahiko Kimura and karateka Masutatsu Oyama. He himself learned some judo and boxing, training the latter under Yujiro Watanabe, reportedly with great success although without ever competing.

Through his life Wakaki adhered to Japanese militarism, and worked as a bodyguard for Mitsuru Toyama, founder of the ultranationalist Gen'yōsha society. Wakaki might have performed at least one political murder for Toyama, who helped him escape consequences. However, the two seemed to have a falling out, with Toyama once attacking him with a katana. After World War II, Wakaki suffered a stroke which paralyzed part of his body, but he found the way to keep training and teaching. He died at 89 years old, being buried in a coffin especially built for his body, still imposing for his advanced age.

== In popular culture ==
The character Takeshi Wakatsuki from manga series Kengan Ashura was inspired by Wakaki.
