= Itsutsu-no-kata =

Judo form/technique

Itsutsu no Kata
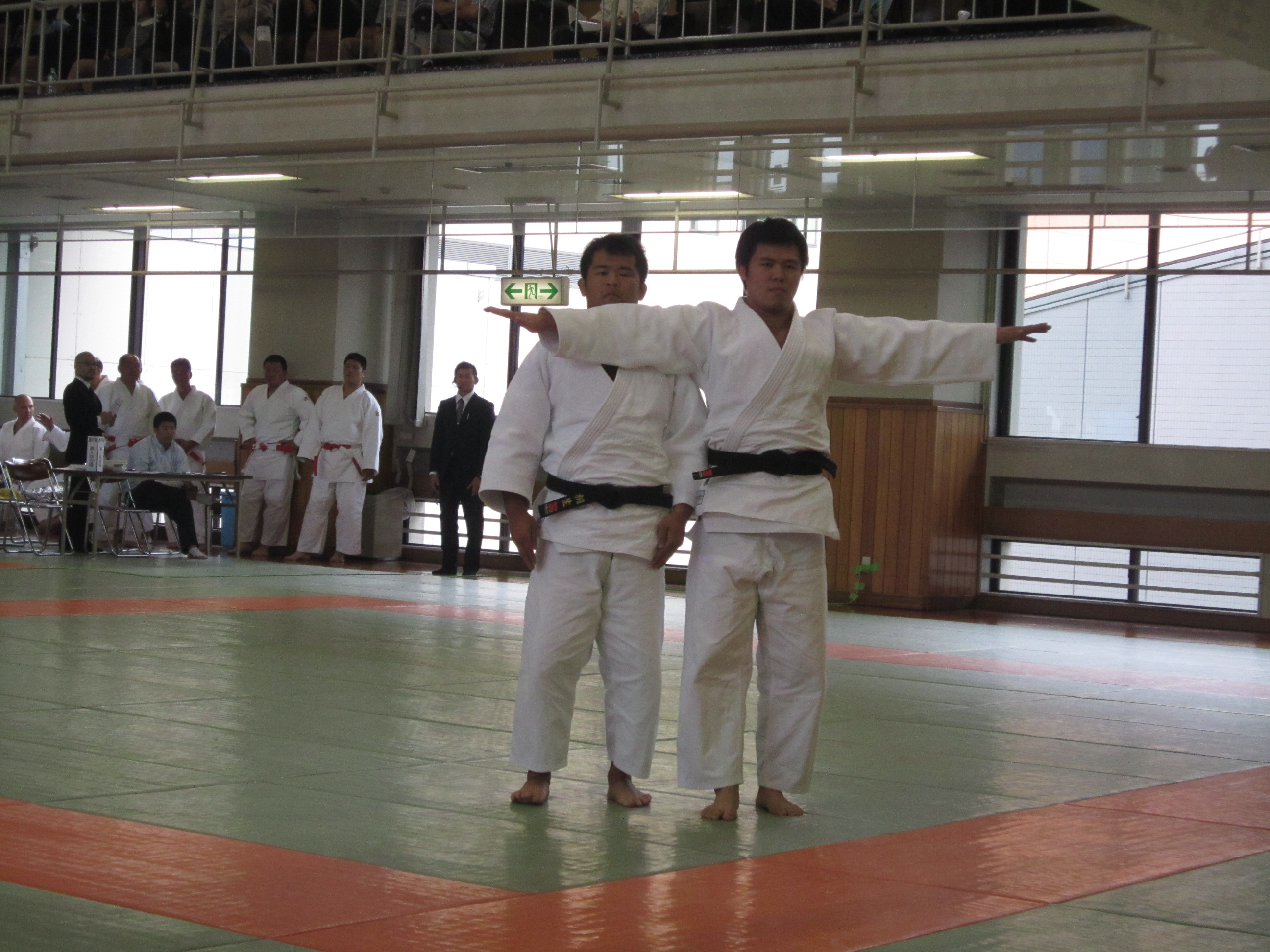
- Classification: Kata
- Sub classification: Kodokan kata
- Kodokan: Yes

Technique name
- Rōmaji: Itsutsu-no-kata
- Japanese: 五の形
- English: Forms of five

Itsutsu-no-kata (五の形; "forms of five") is a kata (a set of prearranged techniques) in Judo. It consists in five techniques, known only by their number. Although popular media generally claim that it was developed by Jigoro Kano, recent scientific research has conclusively shown that the kata predates the foundation of Kodokan judo and that Jigoro Kano took it from Tenjin Shinyō-ryū jujutsu and merely imported it into judo after he made minor amendments to it. The kata is generally considered unfinished. However, an unofficial completed performance version of the kata, expanded to ten techniques (by a European judoka as part of a Master’s level academic programme in judo coaching) was presented in 2012 under the name Tō-no-kata (十の形; "forms of ten"). The techniques of Itsutsu-no-kata are composed of gentle movements evocative of natural forces.

== Techniques ==
- Ichi - direct concentrated energy - direct push
- Ni - deflection - avoid and use Uki otoshi
- San - circular energy or whirlpool - using form of Yoko wakare
- Shi - action and reaction - as the sea sweeps clean the shore
- Go - the void - using form of Yoko wakare

== Videos ==
- Mifune version
