= Growing Gardener =

Sculpture in Tokyo, Japan

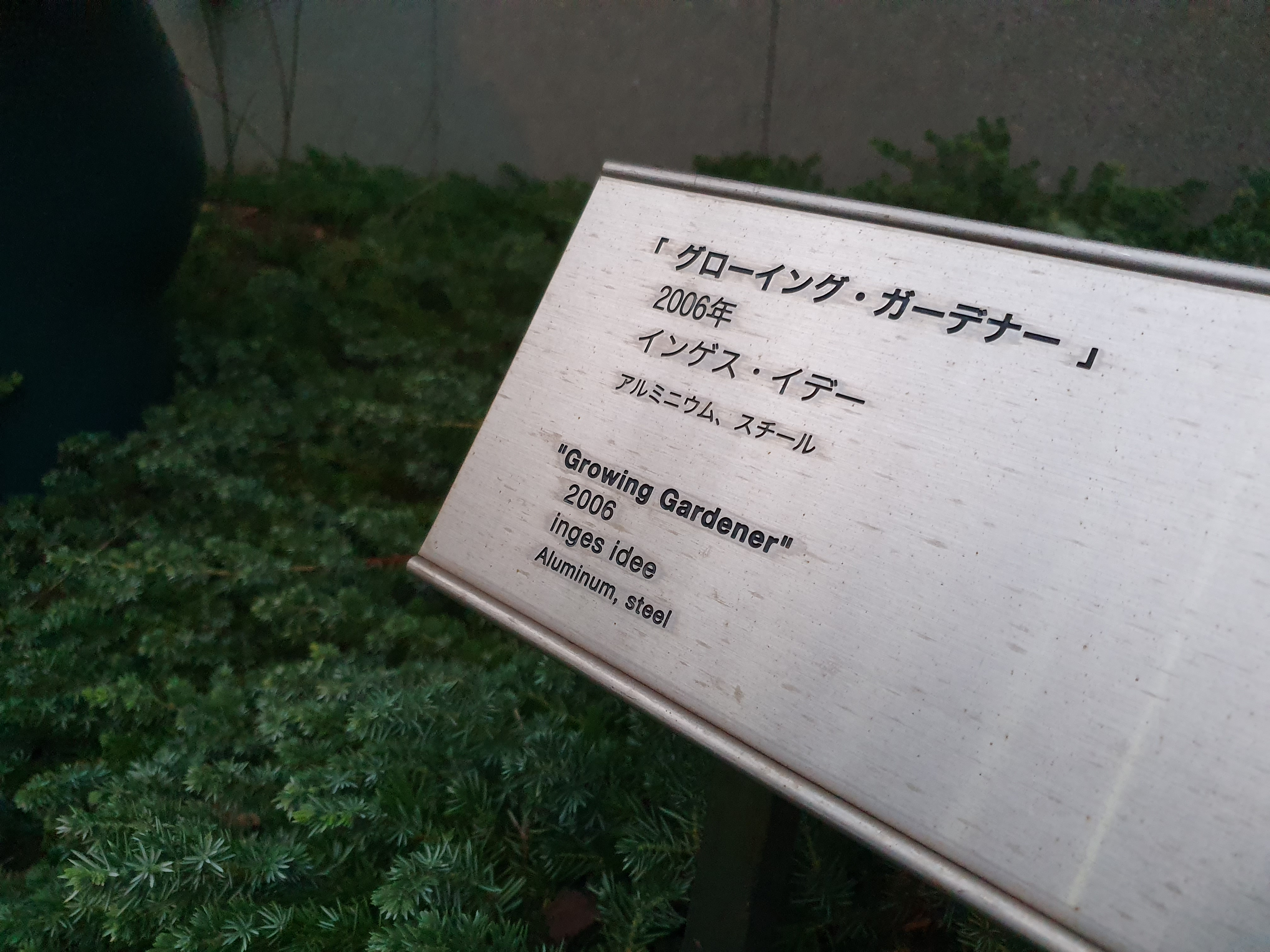
- Plaque for the sculpture
- Artist: Inges Idee
- Location: Tokyo, Japan
- 35.62203°N 139.72707°E

Growing Gardener is a sculpture by Inges Idee, installed in Tokyo, Japan.

== Reception ==
Time Out Tokyo editors Matt Schley and Kaila Imada included Growing Gardener in their 2019 list of the city's "best public art sculptures", writing: "This quirky, cheerful sculpture of a gnome dwarfed by his ludicrously long red hat is the work of German artist collective Inges Idee and can be found near Osaki Station. He's a fun one to catch and will certainly bring a smile to your face – you can sometimes even spot him while you're passing Osaki Station on the JR Yamanote Line."
