= Flame of Freedom =

Sculpture in Tokyo, Japan

- Artist: Marc Couturier
- Location: Tokyo, Japan
- 35.624160°N 139.773944°E

The Flame of Freedom (sometimes called Flame of Liberty) is an artwork by French sculptor Marc Couturier, installed in Odaiba's Symbol Promenade Park, in Tokyo, Japan. The 27-metre (89 ft) sculpture was presented to Japan by France to commemorate France Year.
