= The Drop (sculpture) =

Sculpture by Inges Idee in Vancouver, British Columbia, Canada

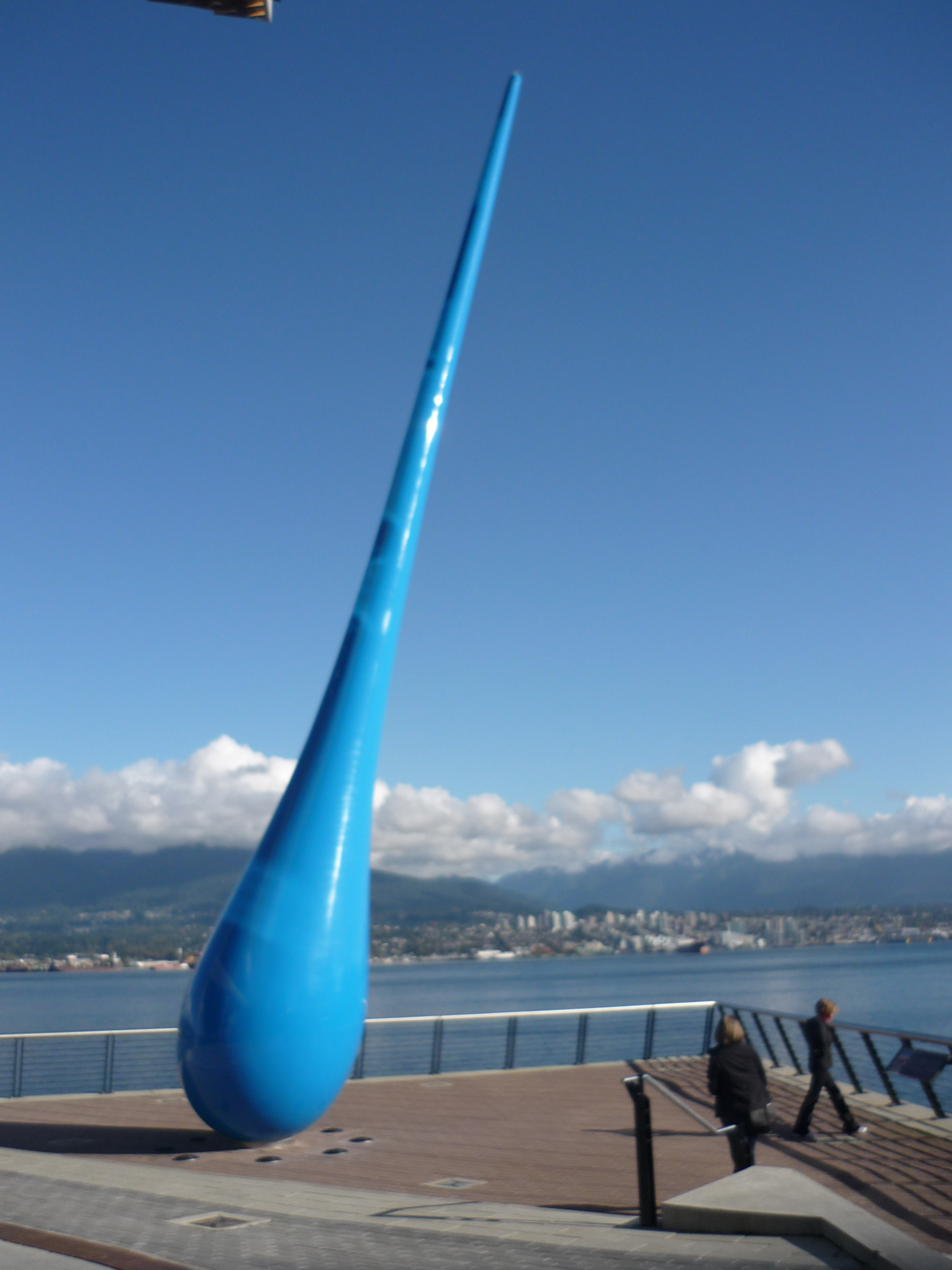
- The Drop in 2010
- Artist: Inges Idee
- Year: 2009
- Type: Sculpture
- Medium: Steel; Styrofoam; polyurethane
- Subject: Raindrop
- Dimensions: 20 m (65 ft)
- Location: Vancouver, British Columbia, Canada; 49°17′21.80″N 123°6′51.00″W
- Owner: BC Pavco
- Website: The Drop at IngesIdee.de

The Drop is a steel sculpture resembling a raindrop designed by the group of German artists known as Inges Idee, located at Bon Voyage Plaza in the Coal Harbour neighborhood of downtown Vancouver. The 65-foot (20 m) tall piece is covered with Styrofoam and blue polyurethane. According to Inges Idee, the sculpture is "an homage to the power of nature" and represents "the relationship and outlook towards the water that surrounds us". The Drop was commissioned as part of the 2009 Vancouver Convention Centre Art Project and is owned by BC Pavco.

== Description and history ==
According to the City of Vancouver Public Art Registry, The Drop is a blue 65-foot (20 m) tall sculpture depicting a "large, gentle 'raindrop' captured in its descent at the moment of contact". The central "spine" of the sculpture is composed of steel and covered with Styrofoam and blue polyurethane. The piece's color complements the sky and contrasts with the large yellow sulfur piles visible on the opposite shoreline.

The Drop was commissioned as part of the Vancouver Convention Centre Art Project and marked the first North American project for Inges Idee, a group of four German artists. The sculpture was installed in 2009 at Bon Voyage Plaza (adjacent to the Vancouver Convention Centre) at the end of Burrard Street, along the waterfront in the Coal Harbour neighborhood of downtown Vancouver. The piece was removed temporarily during the 2010 Winter Olympics for interrupting the view of the television cameras.

== Reception ==
The Vancouver Observer referred to the sculpture as the "quintessential Vancouver piece". According to the publication, The Drop has a "playful relationship with the viewer" and serves as a "big inside joke" for Vancouver residents. This refers to the high amount of rain the city receives; Vancouver is Canada's third most rainy large city, after Abbotsford and Halifax, with over 162 rainy days per year.
