= Statue of Pierre de Coubertin, Tokyo =

Sculpture in Tokyo, Japan

Statue of Pierre de Coubertin
- Medium: Bronze sculpture
- Subject: Pierre de Coubertin
- Location: Tokyo, Japan; 35°40′30.8″N 139°42′54.4″E

A bronze statue of Pierre de Coubertin is installed outside Japan Sport Olympic Square, in Shinjuku, Tokyo, Japan.
