= Tokyo Brushstroke I and II =

Sculpture by Roy Lichtenstein

- Artist: Roy Lichtenstein
- Year: 1994
- Location: Tokyo, Japan; Watermill, New York, U.S.

Tokyo Brushstroke I and II, or Tokyo Brushstrokes, refers to two 1994 aluminum sculptures by Roy Lichtenstein. Copies are installed outside Shinjuku I-Land Co, Ltd., in Tokyo, Japan, and at the Parrish Art Museum in Watermill, New York.

== See also ==
- 1994 in art
