= Inges Idee =

German artist collective

- Formation: 1992
- Type: Artist collective
- Headquarters: Berlin, Germany
- Key people: Hans Hemmert; Axel Lieber; Thomas Schmidt; George Zey
- Website: ingesidee.de

Inges Idee is a German artist collective, formed in 1992, composed of Hans Hemmert, Axel Lieber, Thomas Schmidt, and George Zey.

== Works ==
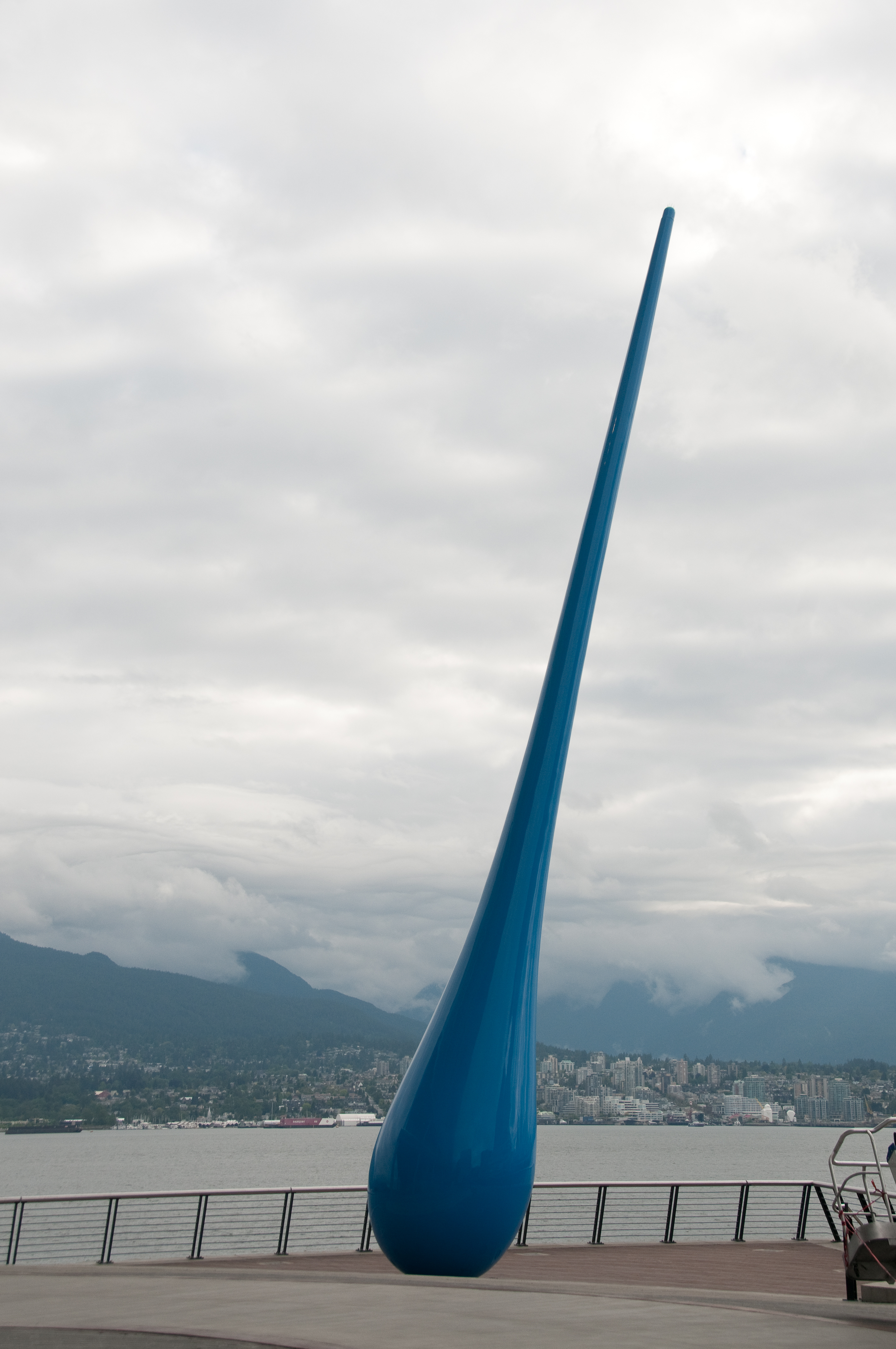
The Drop in 2010

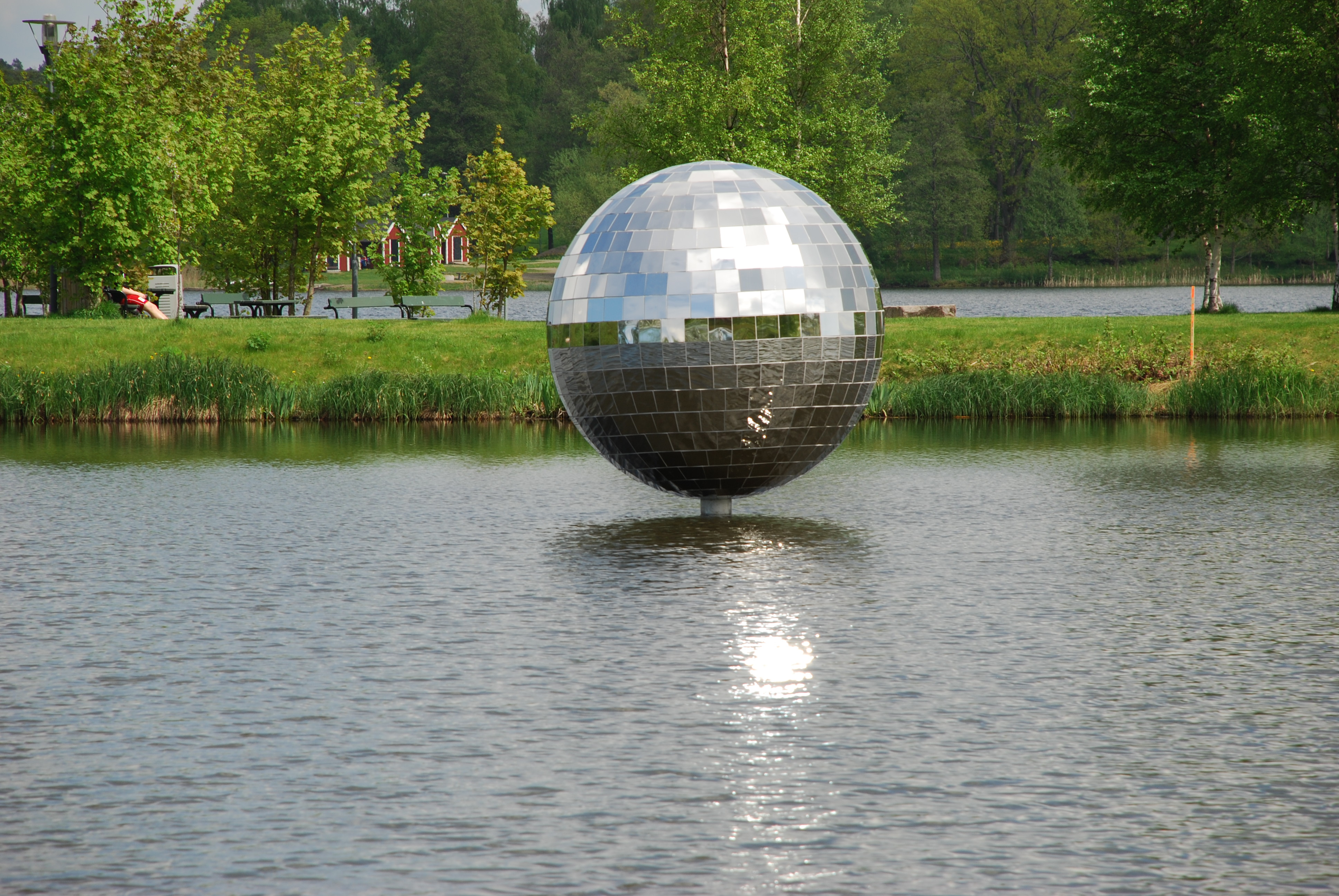
Diskokugel, Växjö

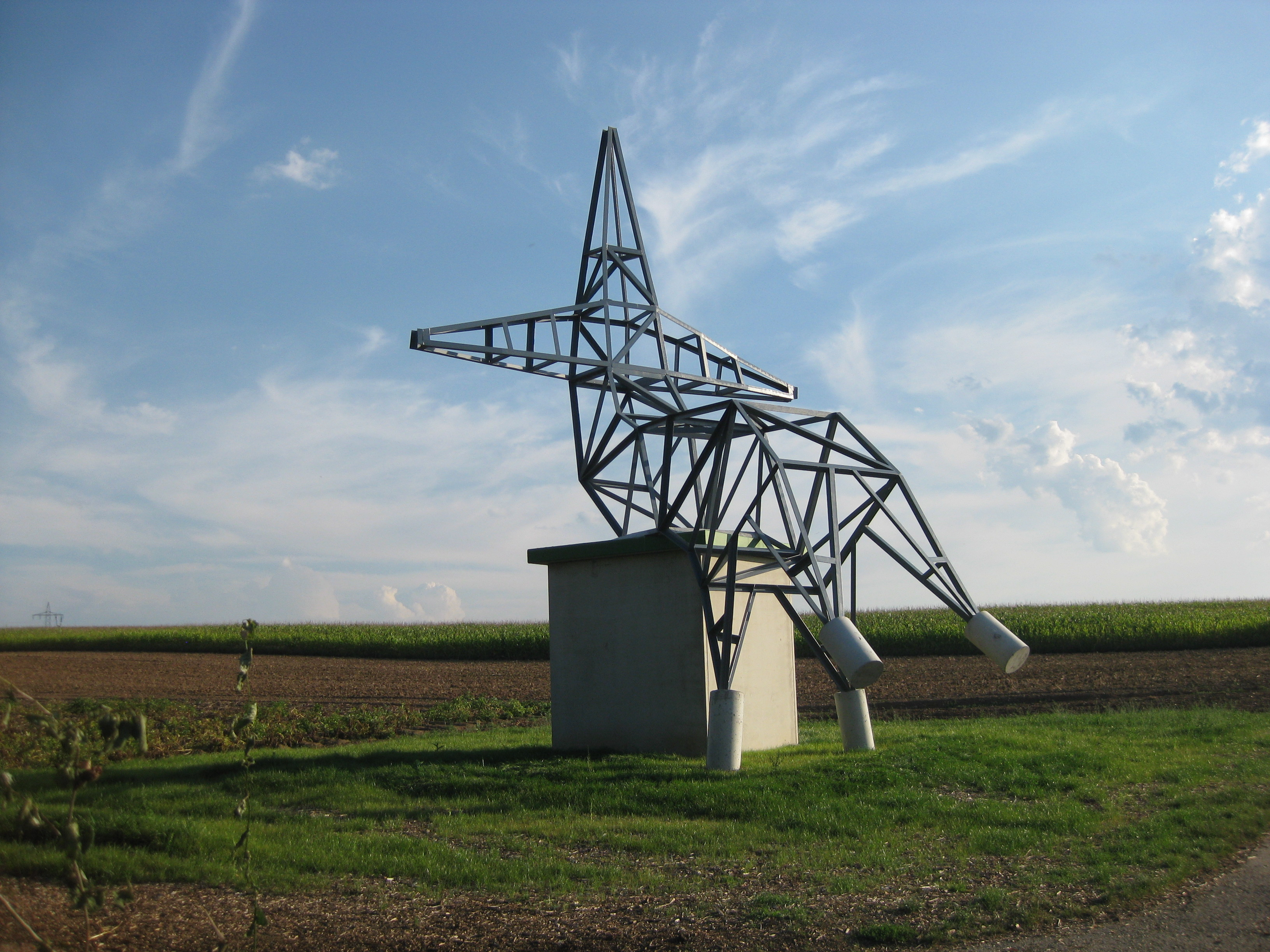
Freizeit/Muße in Fellbach

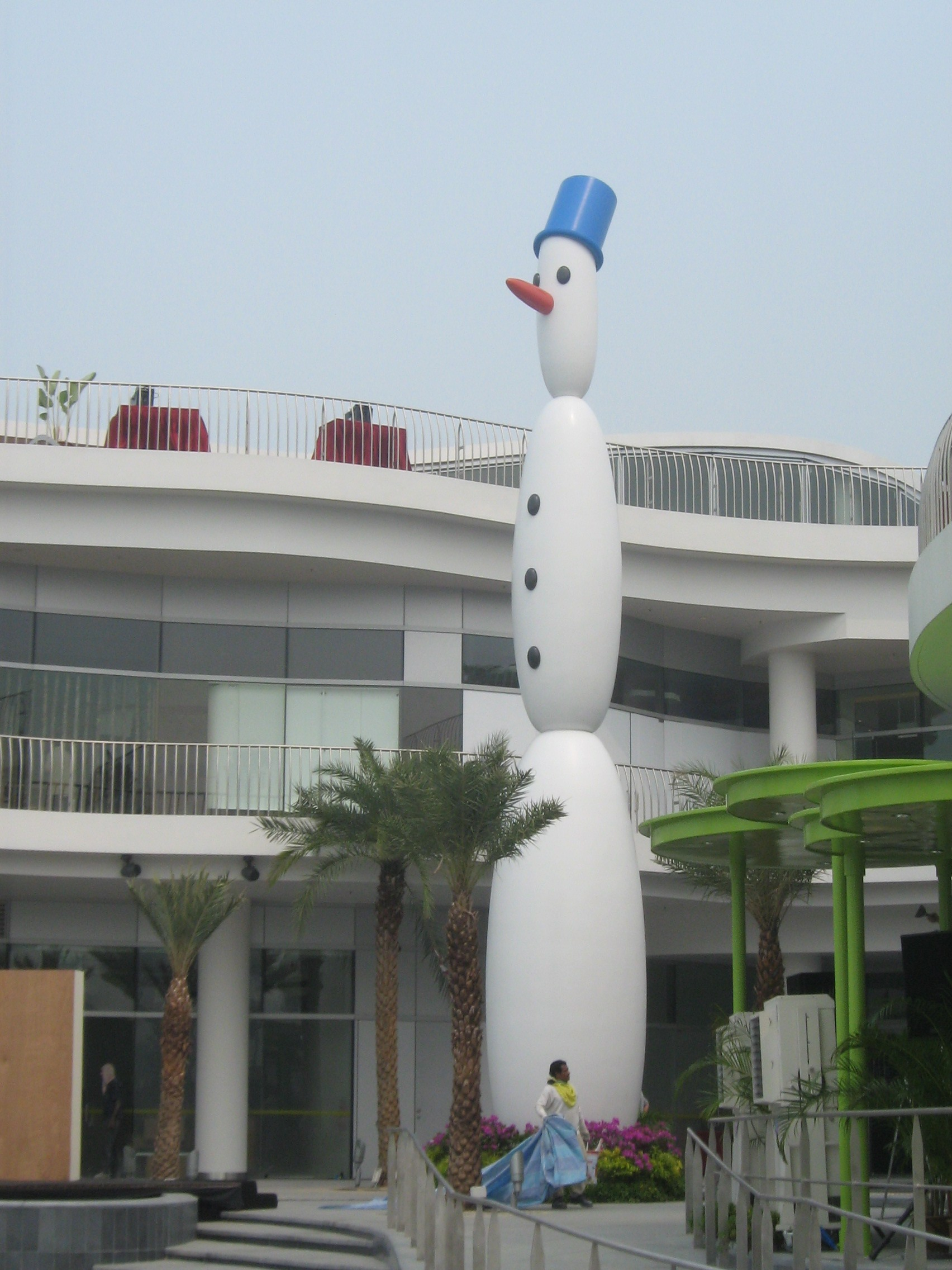
Snowman in Vivocity

Works by Inges Idee:

- 1995: Furnish, Berlin, Germany
- 1999: Streetlight, Linköping, Sweden
- 1999: Magpies, Potsdam, Germany
- 2001: Undeveloped Playground, Emsdetten, Germany
- 2001: Piercing, Germany
- 2001: Langer Banker, Luxembourg
- 2001: In the Same Boat/In International Waters, Germany
- 2004: Zebra, Germany
- 2004: Jewelry, Düsseldorf, Germany
- 2006: 3D², Munich, Germany
- 2006: Limited Liability, Germany
- 2006: Snowman /Snowflake, VivoCity, Singapore
- 2006: Growing Gardener, Tokyo, Japan
- 2007: Place Jean Jaurès, Paris, France
- 2008: Wild Horses, Berlin, Germany
- 2008: Trojan, Germany
- 2008: Parcour, Liechtenstein
- 2008: LETS GO!, Taiwan
- 2008: Chandelier, Stockholm, Sweden
- 2009: Tall Girl, Singapore
- 2009: Exotics, Utrecht, Netherlands
- 2009: The Drop, Vancouver, British Columbia, Canada
- 2010: Running Track, Edmonton, Canada
- 2010: Mirror Ball, Växjö, Sweden
- 2010: Ghost / Unknown Mass, Towada, Japan
- 2010: Receive, Copenhagen, Denmark
- 2011: Brickman, Toronto, Canada
- 2011: From Above, Japan
- 2011: Little Red Riding Hood and…, Potsdam, Germany
- 2011: Upswing, München-Pullach, Germany
- 2011: Leaf, Worms, Germany
- 2013: Zauberlehrling, Oberhausen, Germany
- 2013: Travelling Light, Calgary, Canada
- 2014: Dandy, Frösundavik, Solna, Schweden
- 2016: Freizeit/Muße, Fellbach, Germany

== See also ==
- List of German artists
