= Symbol Promenade Park =

Park in Odaiba, Tokyo, Japan

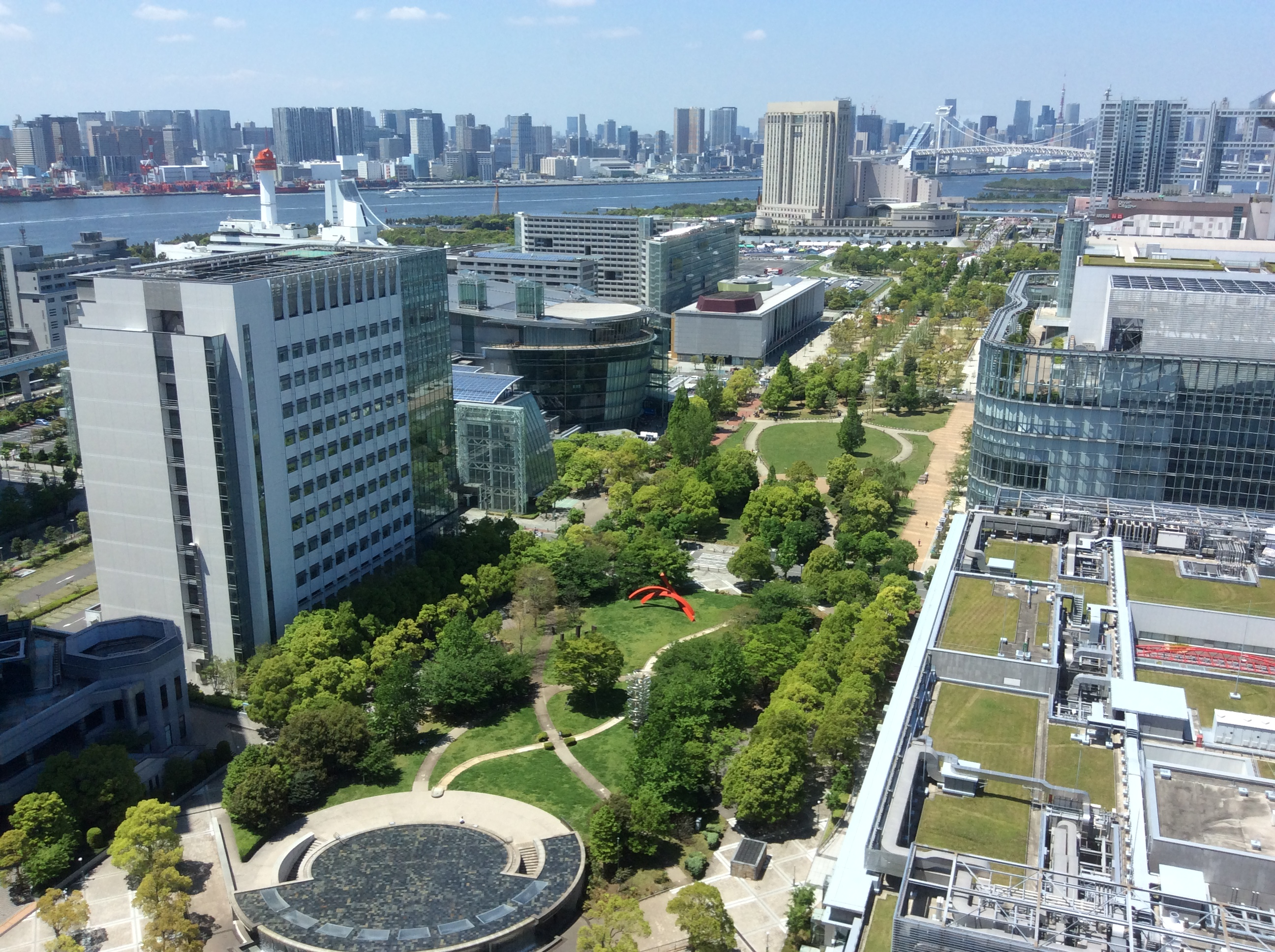
- View of the southern section of the park in 2017
- Interactive map of Symbol Promenade Park
- Type: Park
- Location: Odaiba
- Nearest city: Tokyo
- Created: 1996

Symbol Promenade Park is a park in Odaiba, Tokyo, Japan. The park opened in 1996.

The Flame of Freedom is installed in the park.
