= Statue of Kanō Jigorō, Shinjuku =

Sculpture in Tokyo, Japan

Statue of Kanō Jigorō
- Medium: Bronze sculpture
- Subject: Kanō Jigorō
- Location: Tokyo, Japan; 35°40′31.3″N 139°42′53.5″E

A bronze statue of Kanō Jigorō is installed outside Japan Sport Olympic Square, in Shinjuku, Tokyo, Japan.
