= Kanō Jigorō =

Japanese judoka, educator and politician (1860–1938)

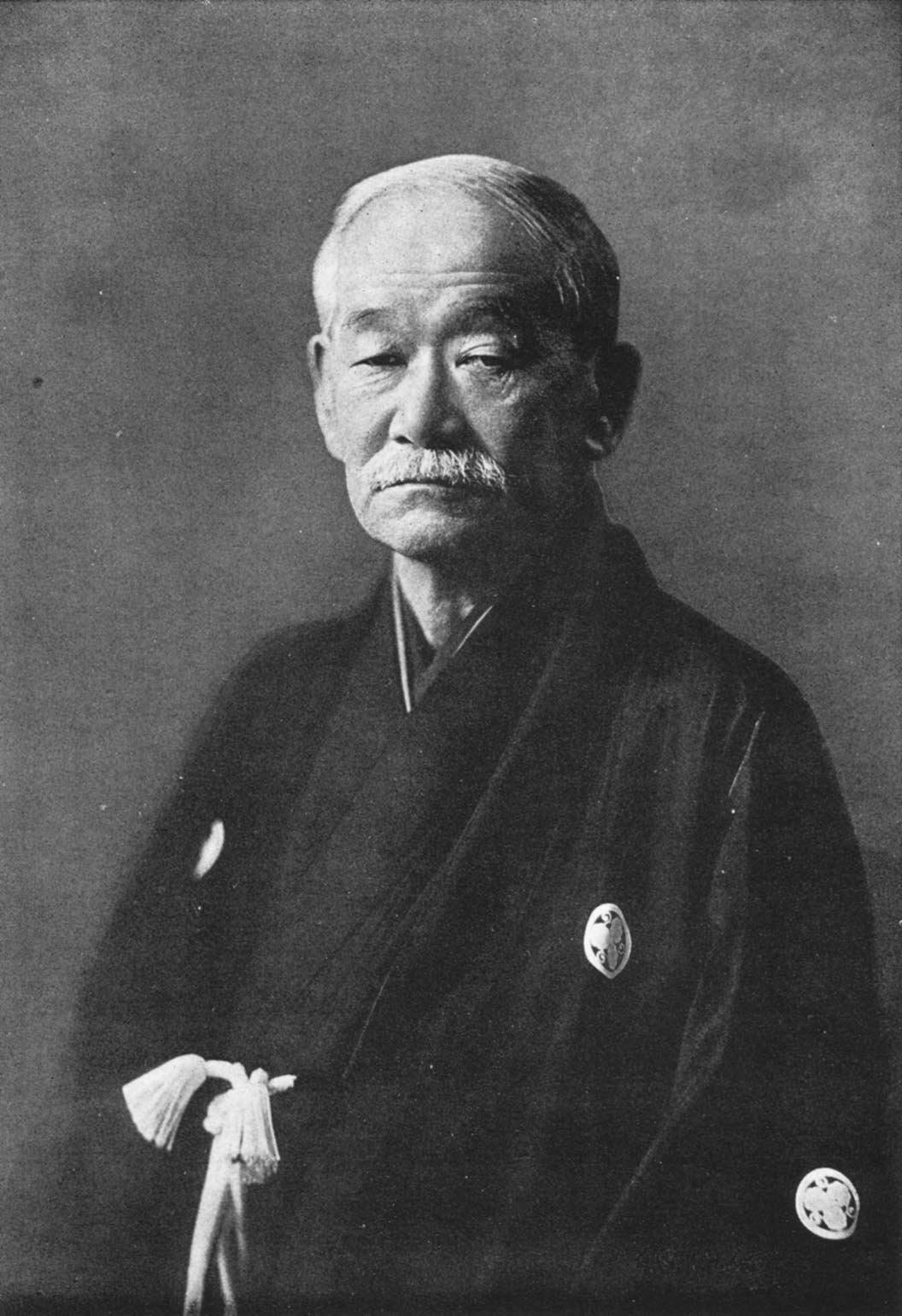
- Born: 28 October 1860 (in lunar calendar, Man'en 1st year) (Note: Kanō was born on 10 December 1860 in the Gregorian calendar, which corresponds to the 28th day of the 10th month in the first year of the Man'en era in lunar calendar. Since Japan only switched to the Gregorian calendar in 1873, it became customary to celebrate Kanō's birthday on 28 October in Japan and elsewhere.); Mikage, Ubara-gun, Settsu Province, Edo Japan (present-day Hyogo Prefecture, Japan)
- Died: 4 May 1938 (aged 77); Pacific Ocean (aboard Hikawa Maru)
- Native name: 嘉納 治五郎
- Style: Judo, Jūjutsu
- Teachers: Fukuda Hachinotsuke; Iso Masatomo; Iikubo Tsunetoshi
- Rank: Kōdōkan jūdō: Shihan (founder); Kitō-ryū: Menkyo kaiden (total transmission license); Tenjin Shin'yō-ryū: Instructor (formal rank unclear)

Other information
- Occupation: Politician; educator; judoka
- University: Tokyo Imperial University
- Notable students: Mitsuyo Maeda; Tomita Tsunejirō; Fukuda Keiko; Mifune Kyūzō; Kotani Sumiyuki; Mochizuki Minoru; Saigō Shirō; Yokoyama Sakujirō; Yamashita Yoshitsugu; Vasili Oshchepkov; Gunji Koizumi; Kenji Kanō

Member of the House of Peers
- In office 1921 – 4 May 1938 Nominated by the Emperor

Kanō Jigorō (嘉納 治五郎; 10 December 1860 – 4 May 1938) was a Japanese judoka, educator, politician, and the founder of judo. Judo was one of the first Japanese martial arts to gain widespread international recognition, and the first to become an official Olympic sport since 1964 (for men) and 1992 (for women), as well as the Commonwealth Games sport in 1990. Pedagogical innovations attributed to Kanō include the use of black and white belts, and the introduction of dan ranking to show the relative ranking among members of a martial-art-style. Well-known mottoes attributed to Kanō include "maximum efficiency minimal effort" (精力善用, seiryoku zen'yō) and "mutual welfare and benefit" (自他共栄, jita kyōei).

In his professional life, Kanō was an educator and a promoter of multiple sports in Japan, including swimming, athletics, weightlifting and other forms of physical education. Aside from judo, he is considered by some to be the originator of modern strength training in Japan. He also helped Gichin Funakoshi and other masters to introduce and systematize karate in the country. He was also a high member of the Dai Nippon Butoku Kai martial arts organization, and played a key role in making judo and kendo part of the Japanese public school programs. His cousin Kenji Kanō, founder of one of the first western boxing clubs in Japan, was also influenced by him.

Important postings included serving as director of primary education for the Ministry of Education (文部省, Monbushō) from 1898 to 1901, and as president of Tokyo Higher Normal School from 1900 until 1920. He was the educational founder of Nada Middle High School in Kobe, Japan. Accomplishments included being the first Asian member of the International Olympic Committee (IOC) (serving from 1909 to 1938), officially representing Japan at most Olympic Games held between 1912 and 1936, and serving as a leading spokesman for Japan's bid for the 1940 Olympic Games.

His official honors and decorations included the First Order of Merit and Grand Order of the Rising Sun and the Third Imperial Degree. Kanō was inducted as the first member of the International Judo Federation (IJF) Hall of Fame on 14 May 1999.

== Early years ==
=== Childhood ===
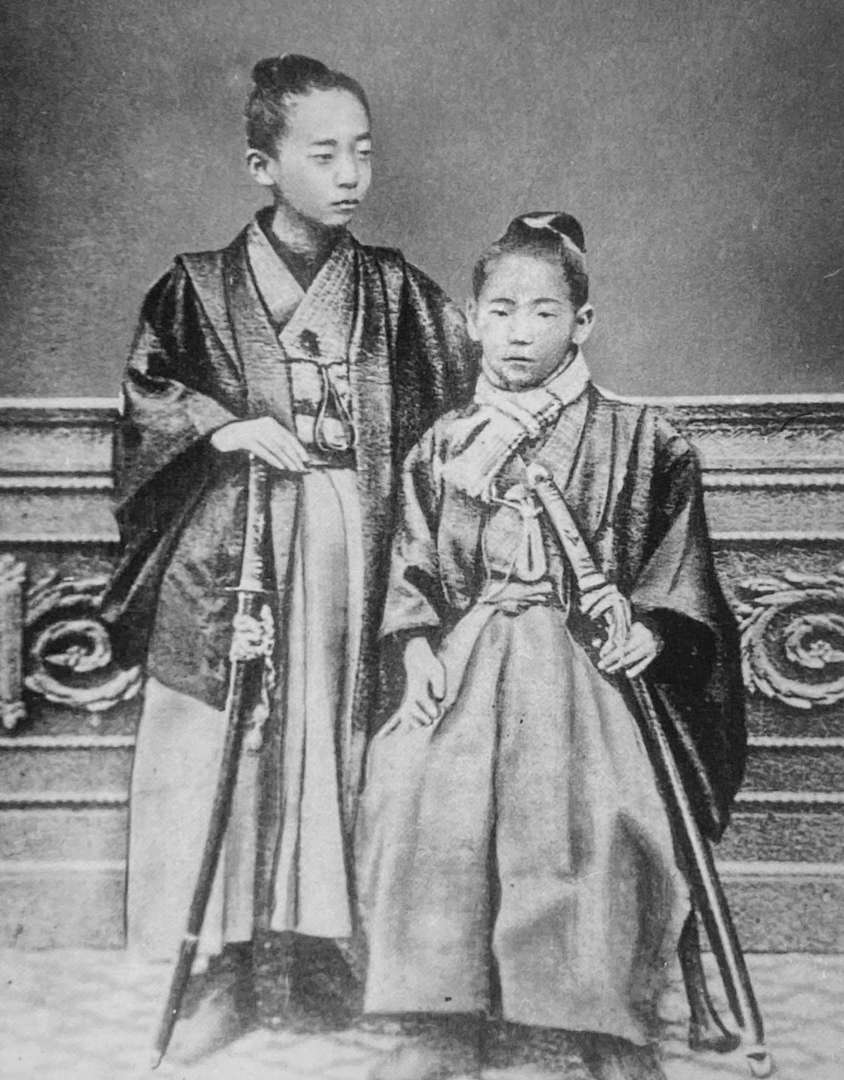
Kanō as a child (right)

Kanō Jigorō was born to a sake-brewing family in the town of Mikage, Japan (now within Higashinada-ku, Kobe). The family sake brands included "Hakushika", "Hakutsuru", and "Kiku-Masamune". However, Kanō's father Kanō Jirōsaku (né Mareshiba Jirōsaku) was an adopted son and he did not go into the family business. Instead he worked as a lay priest and as a senior clerk for a shipping line. Kanō's father was a great believer in the power of education in the modern world, and he provided Jigorō, his third son, with an excellent education. The boy's early teachers included the neo-Confucian scholars Yamamoto Chikuun and Akita Shusetsu. Kanō's mother died when the boy was nine years old, after which his father moved the family to Tokyo. The young Kanō was enrolled in private schools, and had his own English language tutor. In 1874 he was sent to a private school run by Europeans, Ikuei Academy, to improve his English and German language skills. He was fluent in English, kept his diary in that language and wrote it in a very elegant style.

At the time of his adolescence, Kanō stood 1.57 m (5 ft 2 in) but weighed only 41 kg (90 lb). He was frequently bullied at Ikuei due to this small size and his intellectual nature, to the point other students sometimes dragged him out of the school buildings to beat him up, so he wished he were stronger in order to defend himself. One day, Nakai Baisei, a friend of the family who was a member of the shōgun's guard, mentioned that jūjutsu was an excellent form of physical training, and showed Kanō a few techniques by which a smaller man might overcome a larger and stronger opponent. Seeing potential for self-defense on this, Kanō decided he wanted to learn the art, despite Nakai's insistence that such training was out of date and dangerous. By the time Kanō moved to Kaisei Academy, his bullying had died off, but his interest in jūjutsu had not. His father also discouraged him from jūjutsu, as he ignored the bullying his son had suffered, but after noting Kanō's deep interest in the art, he allowed him to train on condition Kanō would strive to master it.

== Jūjutsu ==
Kanō matriculated at Tokyo Imperial University in 1877 and graduated with a B.A. in Political Science and Philosophy in 1882. During his time at the university, he started looking for jūjutsu teachers. He first looked for bonesetters, called seifukushi. His assumption was that doctors who knew the martial art were better teachers. His search brought him to Yagi Teinosuke, who had been a student of Emon Isomata in the Tenjin Shin'yō-ryū school of jūjutsu. Yagi, in turn, referred Kanō to Fukuda Hachinosuke, a bonesetter who taught Tenjin Shin'yō-ryū in a 10-mat room adjacent to his practice. Tenjin Shin'yō-ryū was itself a combination of two older schools: the Yōshin-ryū and Shin no Shindō-ryū.

Fukuda's training method consisted mostly of the student taking fall after fall for the teacher or senior student until he began to understand the mechanics of the technique. Fukuda stressed applied technique over ritual form. He gave beginners a short description of the technique and had them engage in free practice (randori) in order to teach through experience. It was only after the student had attained some proficiency that he taught them traditional forms (kata). This method was difficult, as there were no special mats for falling, only the standard straw mats (tatami) laid over wooden floors.

Kanō had trouble defeating Fukushima Kanekichi, who was one of his seniors at the school. Therefore, Kanō started trying unfamiliar techniques on his rival. He first tried techniques from sumo taught by a former practitioner named Uchiyama Kisoemon. When these did not help, he studied more, and tried a technique ("fireman's carry") that he learned from a book on western catch wrestling. This worked, and kataguruma, or "shoulder wheel", remains part of the judo repertoire, although at this moment the judo organizations of some countries prohibit this throw in competition judo.

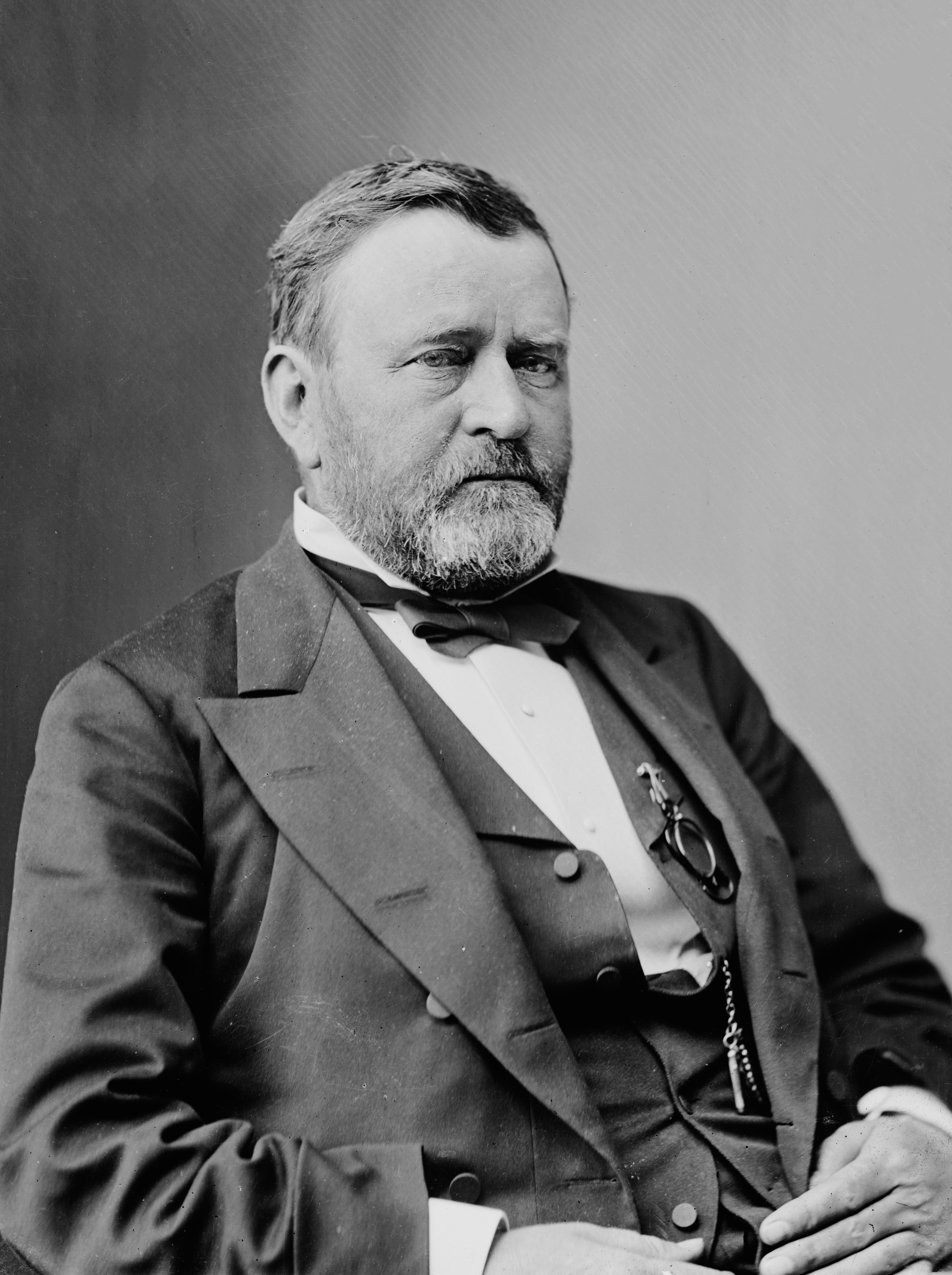
Kanō demonstrated jūjutsu for Ulysses S. Grant when the former U.S. president visited Japan in 1879.

On 5 August 1879, Kanō participated in a jūjutsu demonstration given for former United States president Ulysses S. Grant. This demonstration took place at the home of the prominent businessman Shibusawa Eiichi. Other people involved in this demonstration included the jūjutsu teachers Fukuda Hachinosuke and Iso Masatomo, and Kanō's training partner Godai Ryusaku. Fukuda died soon after this demonstration, at the age of 52. Fukuda's students were not a large group, and among them Kanō was suitably skilled in randori and was clearly the most advanced in kata, and so Fukuda's widow chose Kanō to inherit the scrolls of his school. She also asked that the dojo remain open under Kanō's leadership, and he did assume this teaching responsibility for a time, but he soon decided that he should train more before accepting the duty of being a lead instructor.

Kanō began studying with Iso, who had been a friend of Fukuda. Despite being 62 years old and standing only 5 feet (1.52 m) tall, Iso had gained a powerful build from jūjutsu training. He was known for excellence in kata, and was also a specialist in atemi, or the striking of vital areas. In Iso's method, one began with kata and then progressed to free fighting (randori). Due to Kanō's intense practice and his solid grounding in the jūjutsu taught by Fukuda, Kanō became an assistant instructor at Iso's school. Iso Masatomo died in 1881. While under Iso's tutelage, Kanō witnessed a demonstration by the Yōshin-ryū jūjutsu teacher Totsuka Hikosuke and later took part in randori with members of Totsuka's school. Kanō continued to associate with students and teachers of the other schools of his era, and learned that Motoyama Masahisa, who was on a baseball team with Kanō and also was a graduate of the University of Tokyo, was the son of a master of the Kitō-ryū school. The senior Motoyama was now elderly and taught only kata, but Kanō had been seeking a teacher to train under actively after his previous teacher had died. Due to Kanō's persistence, Motoyama introduced Kanō to Iikubo Tsunetoshi as a more suitable Kitō-ryū master.

Kanō began training in Kitō-ryū with Iikubo Tsunetoshi (Kōnen). Iikubo was an expert in kata and throwing, and fond of randori. Kanō applied himself thoroughly to learning Kitō-ryū, believing Iikubo's throwing techniques in particular to be better than in the schools he had previously studied. Iikubo issued Kanō a formal jūjutsu rank and teaching credential, namely a certificate of menkyo in Kitō-ryū, dated October 1883.

== Kodokan judo ==
=== Establishment ===
"Judo" (柔道, jūdō), written in Kanji.

During the early 1880s, there was no clear separation between the jūjutsu that Kanō was teaching and the jūjutsu that his teachers had taught in the past. Kanō's Kitō-ryū teacher, Iikubo Tsunetoshi, came to Kanō's classes at the early Kodokan two or three times a week to support Kanō's teaching. Eventually student and master began to exchange places, and Kanō began to defeat Iikubo during randori:

Usually it had been him that threw me. Now, instead of being thrown, I was throwing him with increasing regularity. I could do this despite the fact that he was of the Kito-ryu school and was especially adept at throwing techniques. This apparently surprised him, and he was quite upset over it for quite a while. What I had done was quite unusual. But it was the result of my study of how to break the posture of the opponent. It was true that I had been studying the problem for quite some time, together with that of reading the opponent's motion. But it was here that I first tried to apply thoroughly the principle of breaking the opponent's posture before moving in for the throw...

I told Mr. Iikubo about this, explaining that the throw should be applied after one has broken the opponent's posture. Then he said to me: "This is right. I am afraid I have nothing more to teach you."

Soon afterward, I was initiated in the mystery of Kito-ryu jujitsu and received all his books and manuscripts of the school.

— Kanō Jigorō, in reporting his discovery

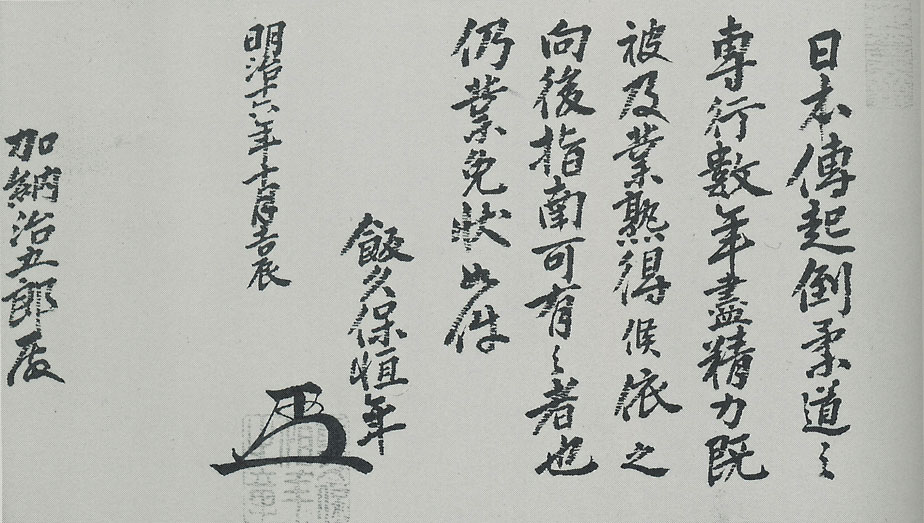
Menkyo certificate issued by Iikubo to Kanō, October 1883. The term Jūdō (柔道), which had already been in use within Kitō ryū, appears in the first (rightmost) column: the art is identified as Nihonden Kitō Jūdō.

After these events, Iikubo granted Kanō menkyo. Iikubo conferred this certification "along with a densho (a document that a master confers on a student who gains master-level proficiency) and everything else that he could bestow". Kanō continued to offer instruction in Kitō-ryū jūjutsu for a few years after this, and the limited records documented from the era show that he was further granted menkyo kaiden: a hontai-no-maki scroll of Kitō-ryū Takenaka-ha (issued in June 1885 to Saigō Shirō) survives which bears the signature of Kanō Jigorō personally.

To name the gradually evolving system he was teaching at the Kodokan, Kanō revived a term that Terada Kan'emon, the fifth headmaster of the Kitō-ryū, had adopted when he founded his own style, the Jikishin-ryū: "jūdō". The name combined the characters jū (柔), meaning "pliancy", and dō, which is literally "The Way", but figuratively meaning 'method.'

From a technical standpoint, Kanō combined the throwing techniques of the Kitō-ryū and the choking and pinning techniques of the Tenjin Shin'yō-ryū. As such, judo's Koshiki-no-kata preserves the traditional kata of Kitō-ryū, while Itsutsu-no-kata is from Tenjin Shin'yō-ryū; in both cases there are only minor differences from the mainline tradition of each school as learned by Kanō. Similarly, a number of techniques from Tenjin Shin'yō-ryū are preserved in judo's Kime-no-kata, although Kime-no-kata itself was newly composed by Kanō for his judo students.

Kanō's initial work was influenced by various methods and institutions. As he wrote in 1898, "By taking together all the good points I had learned of the various schools and adding thereto my own inventions and discoveries, I devised a new system for physical culture and moral training as well as for winning contests." However, after judo was introduced into the Japanese public schools, a process that took place between 1906 and 1917, there was increasing standardization of kata and tournament technique.

=== Development ===
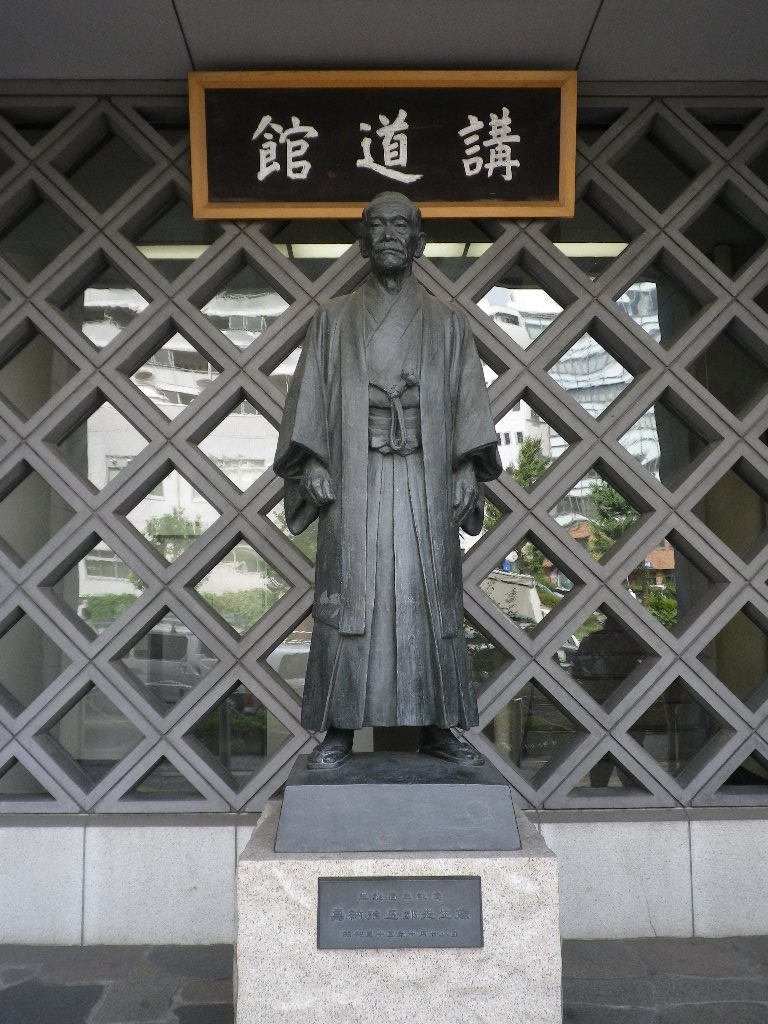
Statue of Kanō Jigoro outside the Kodokan Institute in Tokyo

Kanō also oversaw the development and growth of his judo organization, the Kodokan Judo Institute. This was a remarkable effort in itself, as the Kodokan's enrollment grew from fewer than a dozen students in 1882 to more than a thousand dan-graded members by 1911.

In May or June 1882, Kanō started the Kodokan judo with twelve mats, in space belonging to the Eishō-ji (永昌寺), a Buddhist temple in what was then the Shitaya ward of Tokyo (now the Higashi Ueno district of Taitō ward), with Iikubo attending the dōjō three days a week to help teach. Kanō had only a handful of students at this time, but they improved their technique through regular contests with local police jūjutsu teams.

The Kodokan moved to a 60-mat space in April 1890. In December 1893, the Kodokan started moving to a larger space located in Tomizaka-cho, Koishikawa-cho, and the move was completed by February 1894.

The Kodokan's first kangeiko, or winter training, took place at the Tomizaka-cho dojo during the winter of 1894–1895. Midsummer training, or shochugeiko, started in 1896. "In order to inure the pupil to the two extremes of heat and cold and to cultivate the virtue of perseverance", Britain's E.J. Harrison wrote:

all [Japanese judo] dojo including the Kodokan hold special summer and winter exercises. For the former, the hottest month of the year, August, and the hottest time of the day, from 1 pm, are chosen; and for the latter commencing in January, the pupils start wrestling at four o'clock in the morning and keep it up until seven or eight. The summer practice is termed shochugeiko and the winter practice kangeiko. There is likewise the 'number exercise' on the last day of the winter practice when as a special test of endurance, the pupils practice from 4 am till 2 pm and not infrequently go through as many as a hundred bouts within that interval.

During the late 1890s, the Kodokan moved two more times; first to a 207-mat space in November 1897, and then to a 314-mat space in January 1898. In 1909, Kanō incorporated the Kodokan, and endowed it with 10,000 yen (then about US$4,700). The reason, said Japan Times on 30 March 1913, was "so that this wonderful institution might be able to reconstruct, for that is what it really does, the moral and physical nature of the Japanese youth, without its founder's personal attention."

The Kodokan moved once again during Kanō's lifetime, and on 21 March 1934, the Kodokan dedicated this 510-mat facility. Guests at the opening included the Belgian, Italian, and Afghan ambassadors to Japan. In 1958, when the Kodokan moved to its current eight story facility, that now has more than 1200 mats, the old building was sold to the Japan Karate Association.

=== Ideals ===
On 18 April 1888, Kanō and Reverend Thomas Lindsay presented a lecture called "Jiujitsu: The Old Samurai Art of Fighting without Weapons" to the Asiatic Society of Japan. This lecture took place at the British Embassy in Tokyo. Its theme was that the main principle of judo involved gaining victory by yielding to strength.

Being an idealist, Kanō had broad aims for judo, which he saw as something that simultaneously encompassed self-defense, physical culture, and moral behavior.

Since the very beginning, I had been categorizing Judo into three parts, rentai-ho, shobu-ho, and shushin-ho. Rentai-ho refers to Judo as a physical exercise, while shobu-ho is Judo as a martial art. Shushin-ho is the cultivation of wisdom and virtue as well as the study and application of the principles of Judo in our daily lives. I therefore anticipated that practitioners would develop their bodies in an ideal manner, to be outstanding in matches, and also to improve their wisdom and virtue and make the spirit of Judo live in their daily lives. If we consider Judo first as a physical exercise, we should remember that our bodies should not be stiff, but free, quick and strong. We should be able to move properly in response to our opponent's unexpected attacks. We should also not forget to make full use of every opportunity during our practice to improve our wisdom and virtue. These are the ideal principles of my Judo.

"Because judo developed based on the martial arts of the past, if the martial arts practitioners of the past had things that are of value, those who practice judo should pass all those things on. Among these, the samurai spirit should be celebrated even in today's society"

In 1915, Kanō gave this definition to judo:

Judo is the way of the highest or most efficient use of both physical and mental energy. Through training in the attack and defence techniques of judo, the practitioner nurtures their physical and mental strength, and gradually embodies the essence of the Way of Judo. Thus, the ultimate objective of Judo discipline is to be utilized as a means to self-perfection, and thenceforth to make a positive contribution to society.

In 1918, Kanō added:

Don't think about what to do after you become strong – I have repeatedly stressed that the ultimate goal of Judo is to perfect the self, and to make a contribution to society. In the old days, Jūjutsu practitioners focused their efforts on becoming strong, and did not give too much consideration to how they could put that strength to use. Similarly, Judo practitioners of today do not make sufficient efforts to understand the ultimate objective of Judo. Too much emphasis is placed on the process rather than the objective, and many only desire to become strong and be able to defeat their opponents. Of course, I am not negating the importance of wanting to become strong or skilled. However, it must be remembered that this is just part of the process for a greater objective... The worth of all people is dependent on how they spend their life making contributions.

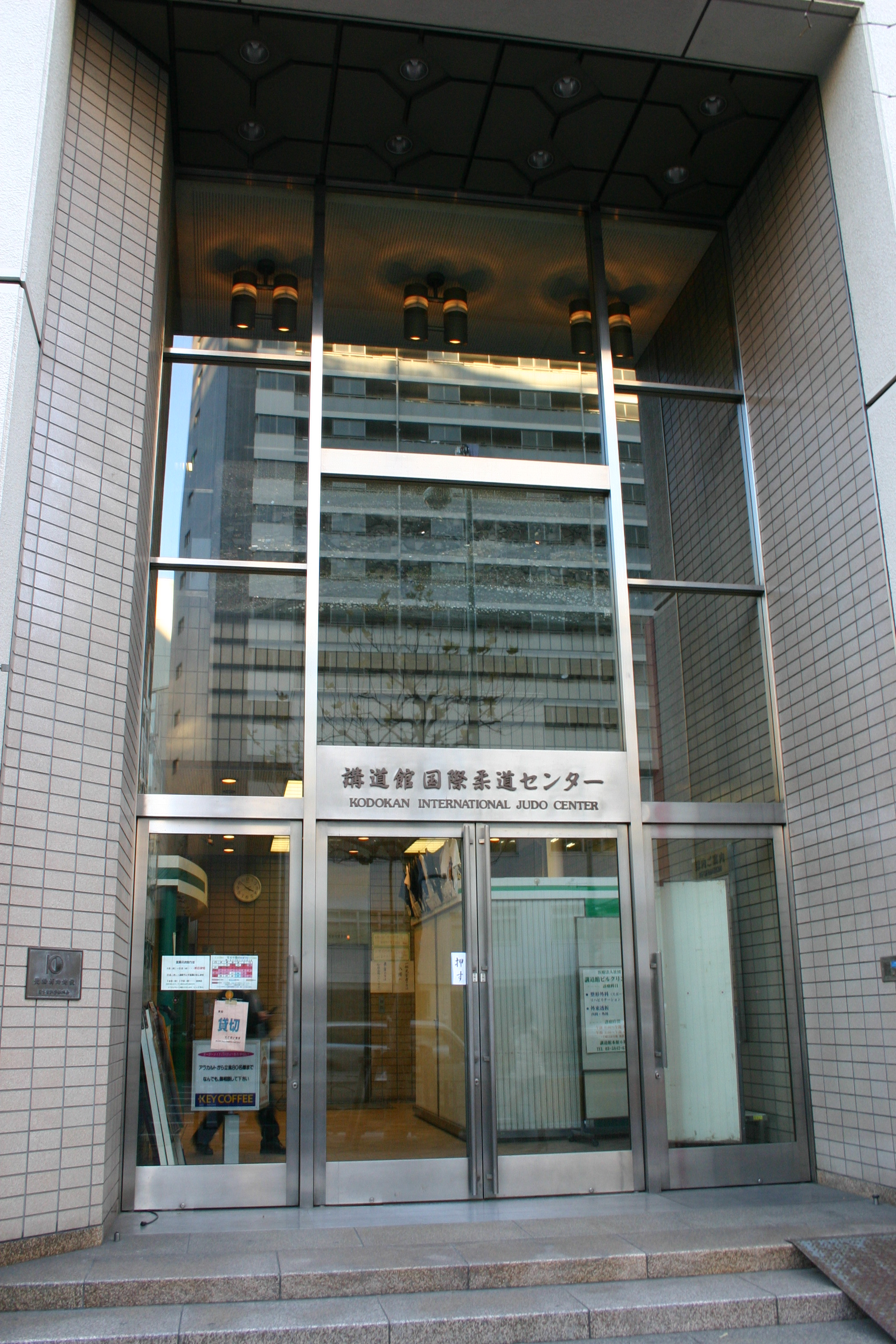
The Kodokan dojo main entrance in Tokyo

During March 1922, Kanō brought all this to fruition through the introduction of the Kodokan Bunkakai, or Kodokan Cultural Association. This organization held its first meeting at Tokyo's Seiyoken Hotel on 5 April 1922, and held its first public lecture three days later at the YMCA hall in Kanda. The mottoes of the Kodokan Cultural Association were "Good Use of Spiritual and Physical Strength" and "Prospering in Common for Oneself and Others." Although those are literal translations, the phrases were usually translated into English as "Maximum Efficiency with Minimum Effort" and "Mutual Welfare and Benefit." The theories of this organization were described in some detail in an article published in an American magazine Living Age in September 1922.

The purpose of my talk is to treat of judo as a culture: physical, mental, and moral, – but as it is based on the art of attack and defense, I shall first explain what this judo of the contest is…

A main feature of the art is the application of the principles of non-resistance and taking advantage of the opponent's loss of equilibrium; hence the name jūjutsu (literally soft or gentle art), or judo (doctrine of softness or gentleness)...

...of the principle of the Maximum Efficiency in Use of Mind and Body. On this principle the whole fabric of the art and science of judo is constructed.

Judo is taught under two methods, one called randori, and the other kata. Randori, or Free Exercise, is practised under conditions of actual contest. It includes throwing, choking, holding down, and bending or twisting the opponent's arms or legs. The combatants may use whatever tricks they like, provided they do not hurt each other, and obey the general rules of judo etiquette. Kata, which literally means Form, is a formal system of prearranged exercises, including, besides the aforementioned actions, hitting and kicking and the use of weapons, according to rules under which each combatant knows beforehand exactly what his opponent is going to do.

The use of weapons and hitting and kicking is taught in kata and not in randori, because if these practices were resorted to in randori injury might well arise...

As to the moral phase of judo, – not to speak of the discipline of the exercise room involving the observance of the regular rules of etiquette, courage, and perseverance, kindness to and respect for others, impartiality and fair play so much emphasized in Western athletic training, – judo has special importance in Japan...

=== In the Dai Nippon Butoku Kai ===
Aside from his role in Kodokan, Kanō became an important member of the Dai Nippon Butoku Kai, the largest martial arts organization in Japan. He was appointed president of the committee for the establishment of jujutsu randori in 1899 and of jujutsu kata in 1906. He was also one of the three members of the council tasked with establishing the teaching ranks of all martial arts, called hanshi and kyoshi, along with Kunimichi Kitagaki and Noboru Watanabe. Kanō himself was appointed judo hanshi, being one of the youngest masters in the organization. Moreover, he was president of the committee tasked with surveying all martial arts in the Butoku Kai in 1914, covering judo, kendo, iaido, kyūjutsu and sōjutsu, among others.

Kano acknowledged that while not all koryu styles practised randori principles, there were many of them worthy to preserve, like Daitō-ryū Aiki-jūjutsu and Yagyū Shingan-ryū. He visited their dojos to manage the recopilation of the techniques he did not deem useful to be integrated into judo.

=== Physical education ===
In 1927, following his maxim, Kanō created the "Maximum-Efficiency National Physical Education" (精力善用国民体育, seiryoku zenyō kokumin taīku), a method of multipurpose physical education for children, adults and elders alike. It was divided in two forms, the offensive-defensive style (攻防式, kōbō-shiki), based around judo and karate moves, and the dance style (舞踊式, buyō-shiki), a mix of movements from dance, noh theater and natural principles similar as those found in the judo itsutsu-no-kata. Kanō considered that judo principles had to be applied not only to judo and physical education, but other national sports like kenjutsu and bōjutsu, western sports like boxing and wrestling, and eventually the whole society. This National Physical Education is still practiced in judo as the Seiryoku Zen'yo Kokumin Taiiku no Kata.

Related to the previous, Kanō also developed the judo-dance (柔道舞踊, jūdō buyō), an artistic form mixing judo techniques with dance moves, conceived to popularize judo among Japanese women of the 20th century. It was taught by one of the Kodokan's first female instructors, Atsuko Futase, and staged in championships and events. It eventually died out with the popularization of women's judo and the death of Futase in 1998.

== Professional life ==
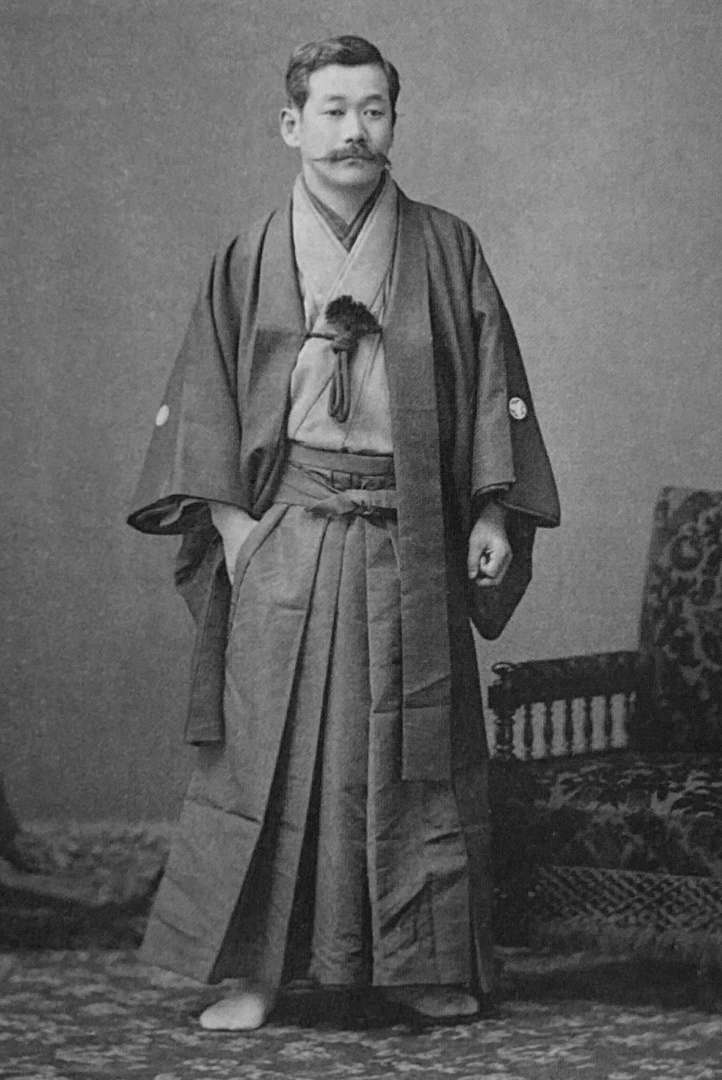
Kanō Jigorō, 32 years old, c. 1892

=== Educator ===
Although Kanō promoted judo whenever he could, he earned his living as an educator.

Kanō entered University of Tokyo during June 1877. He majored in political science and economics, which at that time were taught by the Department of Aesthetics and Morals. One of his most beloved teachers was the American scholar Ernest Fenollosa. He graduated in July 1882, and the following month he began work as a professor, fourth class, at the Gakushuin, or Peers School, in Tokyo. In 1883, Kanō was appointed professor of economics at Komaba Agricultural College (now the Faculty of Agriculture at University of Tokyo), but during April 1885, he returned to Gakushuin, with the position of principal.

In January 1891, Kanō was appointed to a position at the Ministry of Education. In August 1891, he gave up this position to become a dean at the Fifth Higher Normal School (present-day Kumamoto University). One of the teachers at Fifth Higher between 1891 and 1893 was Lafcadio Hearn. Around this same time, Kanō married. His wife, Sumako Takezoe, was the daughter of a former Japanese ambassador to Korea. Eventually, the couple had six daughters and three sons.

During the summer of 1892, Kanō went to Shanghai to help establish a program that would allow Chinese students to study in Japan. Kanō revisited Shanghai during 1905, 1915, and 1921.

In January 1898, Kanō was appointed director of primary education at the Ministry of Education, and in August 1899, he received a grant that allowed him to study in Europe. His ship left Yokohama on 13 September 1899, and he arrived in Marseille on 15 October. He spent about a year in Europe, and during this trip, he visited Paris, Berlin, Brussels, Amsterdam, and London. He returned to Japan in 1901. Soon after returning to Japan, he resumed his post as president of Tokyo Higher Normal School, and he remained in this position until his retirement on 16 January 1920. He also helped establish Nada Middle High School in 1927 at Kobe, which later became one of highest-ranked high schools in Japan.

Considering that he majored in political science and economics, Kanō's family thought that after graduating from university, he would pursue a career in some government ministry. Indeed, through influential friends of his father's, he was initially offered a position with the Ministry of Finance. However, his love for teaching led him instead to accept a position teaching at Gakushuin. The students of Japan's elite attended Gakushuin and were of higher social positions than their teachers. The students were allowed to ride in rickshaws (jinrikisha) right to the doors of the classes, whereas teachers were forbidden. The teachers often felt compelled to visit the homes of these students whenever summoned to give instruction or advice. In effect, the teachers were treated as servants.

Kanō believed this to be unacceptable. He refused to play such a subservient role when teaching his students. To Kanō, a teacher must command respect. At the same time, he employed the latest European and American pedagogical methods. The theories of the American educator John Dewey especially influenced him. Kanō's manner had the desired effect upon the students, but the administration was slower to warm to his methods and it was not until the arrival of a new principal that Kanō's ideas found acceptance.

All this is to say that Kanō's educational philosophy was a combination of both traditional Japanese neo-Confucianism and contemporary European and American philosophies, to include Instrumentalism, Utilitarianism, and "evolutionary progressivism", as Social Darwinism was then known.

The goals of Kanō's educational philosophies and methods (indeed, the goals of most Japanese educational programs of the early 20th century) were: to develop minds, bodies, and spirits in equal proportion; to increase patriotism and loyalty, especially to the Emperor; to teach public morality; and to increase physical strength and stamina, especially for the purpose of making young men more fit for military service.

Calisthenics, especially as done in the huge formations favored at the time, could be boring, and at the high school and college levels, games such as baseball and rugby were more often spectator sports than a practical source of physical exercise for the masses. Moreover, at elite levels, baseball, football, and even judo did not put much emphasis on moral or intellectual development. Instead, elite coaches and athletes tended to emphasize winning, at almost any cost.

For Kanō, the answer to this conundrum was one word: judo. Not judo in the sense of simply throwing other people around, and definitely not judo in the sense of winning at any cost. Instead, it was judo in the sense of "Maximum Efficiency with Minimum Effort" and "Mutual Welfare and Benefit." Or, as Kanō himself put it to a reporter in 1938: "When yielding is the highest efficient use of energy, then yielding is judo."

=== International Olympic Committee ===
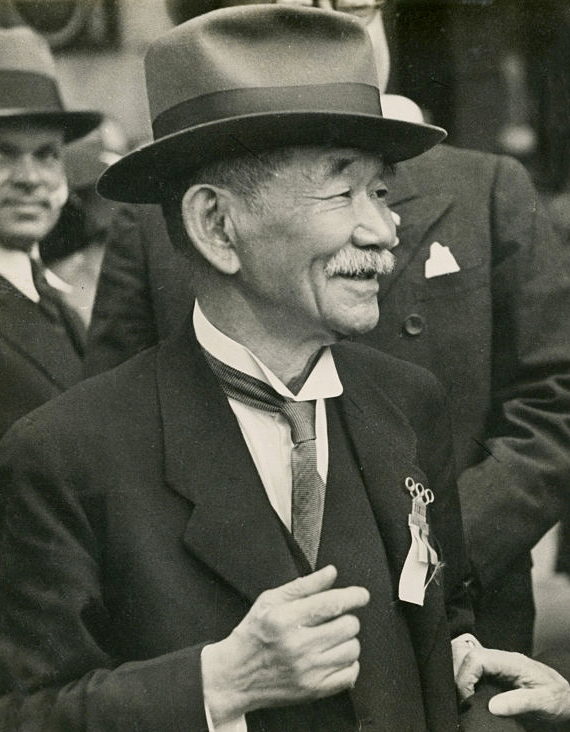
Kanō Jigorō after the IOC vote on 31 July 1936 in Berlin, which decided to organize the 1940 Olympics in Tokyo

Kanō became active in the work of the International Olympic Committee (IOC) in 1909. This came about after Kristian Hellström of the Swedish Olympic Committee wrote to the governments of Japan and China to ask if they were going to send teams to the 1912 Olympics. The Japanese government did not want to embarrass itself on an international stage by saying no, so the Ministry of Education was told to look into this. The Ministry logically turned to Kanō, who was a physical educator with recent experience in Europe. Kanō agreed to represent Japan at the International Olympic Committee, and, after talking to the French ambassador to Japan and reading pamphlets sent by the Swedes, developed, in his words, "a fairly good idea of what the Olympic Games were."

Toward fulfilling his duties as a member, in 1912, Kanō helped establish the Japan Amateur Athletic Association (Dai Nippon Tai-iku Kyokai), which had the mission of overseeing amateur sport in Japan. Kanō was the official representative of Japan to the Olympics in Stockholm in 1912, and he was involved in organizing the Far Eastern Championship Games held in Osaka during May 1917. In 1920, Kanō represented Japan at the Antwerp Olympics, and during the early 1920s, he served on the Japanese Council of Physical Education. He did not play much part in organizing the Far Eastern Championship Games held in Osaka in May 1923, nor did he attend the 1924 Olympics in Paris, but he did represent Japan at the Olympics in Amsterdam (1928), Los Angeles (1932), and Berlin (1936). From 1931 to 1938, he was also one of the leading international spokesmen in Japan's bid for the 1940 Olympics.

Kanō's chief goal in all this was, in his words, to gather people together for a common cause, with friendly feeling. His goals did not, however, particularly involve getting judo into the Olympics. As he put it in a letter to Britain's Gunji Koizumi in 1936:

I have been asked by people of various sections as to the wisdom and the possibility of Judo being introduced at the Olympic Games. My view on the matter, at present, is rather passive. If it be the desire of other member countries, I have no objection. But I do not feel inclined to take any initiative. For one thing, Judo in reality is not a mere sport or game. I regard it as a principle of life, art and science. In fact, it is a means for personal cultural attainment. Only one of the forms of Judo training, the so-called randori can be classed as a form of sport... [In addition, the] Olympic Games are so strongly flavoured with nationalism that it is possible to be influenced by it and to develop Contest Judo as a retrograde form as Jujitsu was before the Kodokan was founded. Judo should be as free as art and science from external influences – political, national, racial, financial or any other organised interest. And all things connected with it should be directed to its ultimate object, the benefit of humanity.

=== Strength training ===
Kanō got in contact with western strength training in 1900, when he read Sandow's System of Physical Training by pioneer bodybuilder Eugen Sandow. Becoming immediately interested in its workings, he acquired the book's rights to publish it in Japanese under publisher Zoshikai, and also imported Sandow's signature weightlifting gear for its commercialization in Japan. He further researched into the topic while visiting Vienna in 1933 as part of his work in the COI, leading to introduction of powerlifting to the Japanese Ministry of Education. His activities deeply influenced Takemaru Wakaki, considered the pioneer of Japanese bodybuilding, who also trained judoka like Masahiko Kimura and karateka like Mas Oyama.

=== Karate ===
In May 1922, thanks to his influence in the Ministry of Education, Kanō authorized a karate exhibition by pioneer and Shotokan founder Gichin Funakoshi, marking the beginning of the expansion of karate in Japan. In June of the same year, he invited Funakoshi to demonstrate karate at the Kodokan, which preceded much collaboration between the two. Kanō's martial philosophy went to influence several other karate masters, like Chōjun Miyagi and Kenwa Mabuni, founders of the Goju-ryu and Shitō-ryū schools respectively. He met them upon visiting Okinawa in 1927 to survey the local karate expertise, after which he urged them to move to Tokyo and share their teachings.

=== Hepburn romanization ===
Kanō was a member of the Rōmaji Hirome-kai (ローマ字ひろめ会, Society for the Spread of Romanization), one of the two groups that emerged after the Russo-Japanese War from the Rōmaji-kai (羅馬字会, Romanization Club), a group that sought to replace written Japanese with a romanized script instead of kanji and kana. The Rōmaji Hirome-kai supported Hepburn romanization, while the other group, the Nihon no Rōmaji-sha (日本のローマ字社, Romanization Society of Japan), supported Nihon-shiki romanization. In 1908, Hepburn romanization was revised by Kanō and others of the Rōmaji Hirome-kai, which began calling it the Shūsei Hebon-shiki (修正ヘボン式, "modified Hepburn system") or Hyōjun-shiki (標準式, "standard system").

== Death and legacy ==
In 1934, Kanō stopped giving public exhibitions. The reason was his failing health, probably compounded by kidney stones. The British judoka Sarah Mayer wrote "People don't seem to think he will live much longer" to his friends in London. Nevertheless, Kanō continued attending important Kodokan events such as kagami-biraki (New Years' ceremonies) whenever he could, and he continued participating in Olympics business.

On 4 May 1938, Kanō died at sea, during a voyage that he made as member of the IOC on board the NYK Line motor ship Hikawa Maru. Because the Japanese merchant fleet of the 1930s used Tokyo time wherever it was in the world, the Japanese date of death was 4 May 1938 at about 5:33 am JST, whereas the international date of death was 3 May 1938 at 20:33 UTC. The cause of death was officially listed as pneumonia but other sources list food poisoning as the cause of death. During the 1990s, there appeared allegations that Kanō was murdered by poisoning rather than dying of pneumonia. Although there is no known contemporary documentation to support this claim, Kanō's opposition to Japanese militarism was well-known, and many others who also opposed it were allegedly assassinated.

Judo did not die with Kanō. Instead, during the 1950s, judo clubs sprang up throughout the world, and in 1964, judo was introduced as an Olympic sport when Tokyo eventually hosted the 1964 Summer Olympics initially for men, and was reintroduced for good at the 1972 Summer Olympics. Judo events in the Commonwealth Games were first introduced at the 1990 Commonwealth Games, initially classified as an optional sport before becoming a core sport from 2022 onwards. The women's judo events were first introduced at the 1992 Summer Olympics. Kanō's posthumous reputation was therefore assured. Nonetheless, his true legacy was his idealism. As Kanō said in a speech given in 1934, "Nothing under the sun is greater than education. By educating one person and sending him into the society of his generation, we make a contribution extending a hundred generations to come."

Kanō has also been compared to the 9th Marquess of Queensberry in the way his legacy left a whole new set of rules:

Dr Kano's Kodokan rules for his version of jujitsu brought a new, safer kind of fighting to Japan in the same way that the Queensberry Rules, introduced some two decades earlier in 1867, did for boxing in England. Both the Marquess of Queensberry and Dr Kano transformed their sports, making them cleaner and safer. One man took the grappling out of boxing; the other took the boxing out of grappling. One worked with a padded fist; the other with a padded floor. In the latter years of the nineteenth century, the martial histories of eastern and western civilisation had reached a point at which two men at opposite ends of the globe produced, within a few years of each other, the rules which were to herald unarmed combat's own age of enlightenment.

=== Honors ===
- Order of the Rising Sun, Gold Rays with Neck Ribbon, 1938 (Japan).
- On 28 October 2021, Google celebrated Jigorō's 161st birth anniversary with a doodle on its homepage.

== Published works ==
- Kanō, Jigorō. (October 1898 – December 1903). Kokushi.
- Lindsay, Thomas and Kanō, Jigorō. (1889, 1915 reprint). "The Old Samurai Art of Fighting without Weapons", Transactions of the Asiatic Society of Japan, XVI, Pt II, pp. 202–217.
- Kanō, Jigorō. (Jan. 1915 – December 1918). Jūdō.
- Kanō, Jigorō. (1922). "Jiudo: The Japanese Art of Self Defence", Living Age, 314, pp. 724–731.
- Kanō, Jigorō. (1932). "The Contribution of Judo to Education", Journal of Health and Physical Education, 3, pp. 37–40, 58 (originally a lecture given at the University of Southern California on the occasion of the Xth Olympiad).
- Kanō, Jigorō. (1934). "Principles of Judo and Their Applications to All Phases of Human Activity", unpublished lecture given at the Parnassus Society, Athens, Greece, on 5 June 1934, reprinted as "Principles of Judo" in Budokwai Quarterly Bulletin, April 1948, pp. 37–42.
- Kanō, Jigorō. (1936). "Olympic Games and Japan", Dai Nippon, pp. 197–199. In Thomas A. Green and Joseph R. Svinth, eds., Martial Arts in the Modern World. Westport, Connecticut: Greenwood, 2003, pp. 167–172.
- Kanō, Jigorō. (1937). Judo (jujutsu) by Prof. Jigorō Kanō. Tokyo: Board of Tourist Industry, Japanese Government Railways.
- Kanō, Jigorō. (1937). "Jujutsu and Judo; What Are They?" Tokyo: Kodokwan.
- Kanō, Jigorō. (Undated). Jujutsu Becomes Judo.
- Kanō, Jigorō. (1972). Kanō Jigorō, watakushi no shōgai to jūdō. Tokyo: Shin Jinbutsu Oraisha. ISBN 978-4820542414
- Kanō, Jigorō. (1983). Kanō Jigorō chosakushū. Tokyo: Gogatsu Shobo. ISBN 978-4772700214
- Kanō, Jigorō. (1986). Kodokan judo/Jigorō Kanō; edited under the supervision of the Kodokan Editorial Committee. Tokyo and New York: Kodansha International.
- Kanō, Jigorō. (1995). Kanō Jigorō taikei/kanshū Kōdōkan. Tokyo: Hon no Tomosha.
- Kanō, Jigorō. (2013). Mind over muscle – writings from the founder of judo Kodansha USA, English translation from Japanese anthology 2005 ISBN 978-1568364971

== See also ==
- Hard and soft (martial arts)
- Idaten (TV series)
- Judo at the Summer Olympics
- Judo at the Summer Paralympics
- Judo at the Commonwealth Games
- Judo technique
- Kosen judo
- Kuzushi
- Matsugoro Okuda
- The Principle of Ju
- Sanshiro Sugata
- Statue of Kanō Jigorō, Shinjuku

== Sources ==
- Watson, Brian N. (2000). The father of judo : a biography of Jigoro Kano (1st ed.). Tokyo: Kodansha. ISBN 978-4770025302.
- Stevens, John (2013). The way of judo : a portrait of Jigoro Kano and his students (First ed.). Boston: Shambhala. ISBN 978-1590309162.
- Committee for the Commemoration of the 150th Anniversary of the Birth of Jigoro Kano, ed. (2020). The legacy of Kano Jigoro : judo and education (First English ed.). Tokyo, Japan: Japan Publishing Industry Foundation for Culture. ISBN 978-4-86658-136-1. Archived from the original on 7 June 2021.

Sporting positions
New title	Chairman of the Japan Sports Association; 1911–1921	Succeeded by Seiichi Kishi
