= Statue of Kanō Jigorō, Bunkyō =

Sculpture in Tokyo, Japan

Statue of Kanō Jigorō
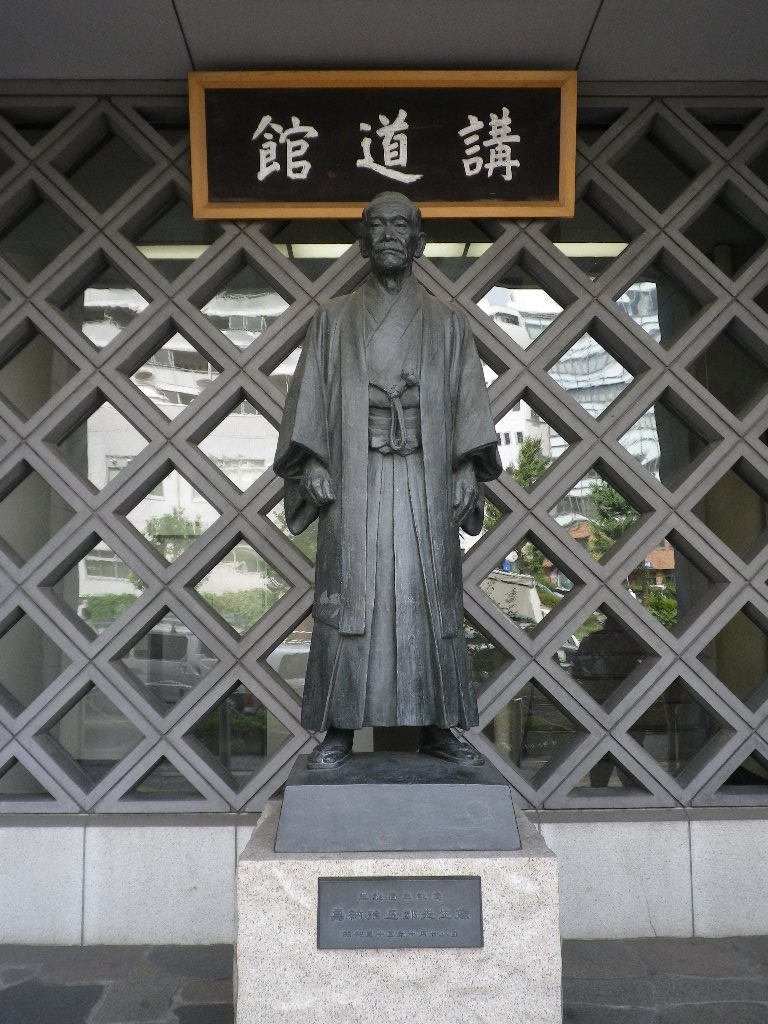
- The statue in 2011
- Medium: Bronze sculpture
- Subject: Kanō Jigorō
- Location: Tokyo, Japan; 35°42′28.8″N 139°45′12.6″E

A statue of Kanō Jigorō is installed outside the Kodokan Judo Institute, in Bunkyō, Tokyo, Japan.
