= Ura juji jime =

Judo technique

Ura-Juji-Jime is the fourth variation of the cross lock, Juji-Jime, demonstrated in The Canon Of Judo, the first three being Katate-, Gyaku-, and Nami- Juji-Jime.

== See also ==
- Judo technique
