= Mataemon Tanabe =

Japanese martial artist

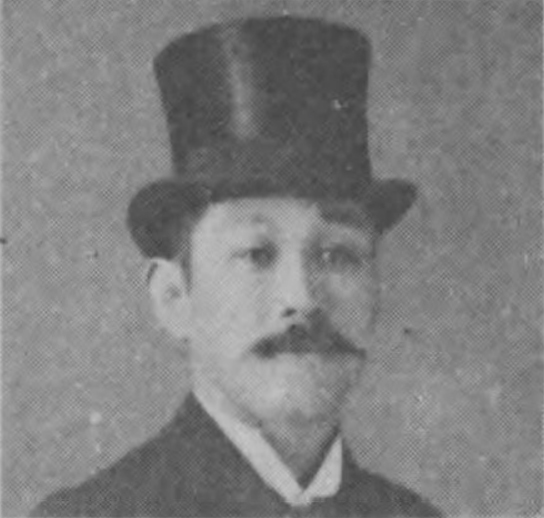
- Born: 1869; Okayama, Japan
- Died: 1942 (aged 72–73); Japan
- Native name: 田辺又右衛門
- Nationality: Japanese
- Style: Fusen-ryū
- Teacher: Torajirō Tanabe

Other information
- Children: Teruo Tanabe
- Notable students: Taro Miyake, possibly- though unlikely Yukio Tani, Sadakazu Uyenishi

Mataemon Tanabe (田辺 又右衛門, Tanabe Mataemon; 1869–1942) was a Japanese jujutsu practitioner and master of the Fusen-ryū school. He became famous for defeating multiple members of the Kodokan in challenge matches, and came to be considered one of the greatest modern jujutsuka.

== Biography ==
=== Early years ===
Tanabe was born in Okayama to Torajiro Tanabe, head of the Fusen-ryū founded by Motsugai Takeda. He started training in jujutsu at 9 years old, and at 14 he started accompanying his father to competitions and challenges, often fighting grown-up men and much heavier opponents. At 17 he received his menkyo kaiden, and he and his father became teachers of their art around the country.

Over the years, he devised a personal strategy of enduring his enemies' holds long enough to get them tired, and then coming back and making them submit with chokes and joint locks. He defined his style as devised by "practicing catching eels in his bare hands and watching snakes swallow frogs." His main field of strength was ne-waza, being nicknamed "Newaza Tanabe" (寝技田辺, "Groundwork Tanabe") and "Newaza no Tatsujin" (寝技の達人, "The Master of Groundwork") for his mastery of ground techniques. However, contrary to popular belief, he was also equally skilled in tachi-waza, to the extent he was described as "at the level of a judo 4th dan" later in his life.

=== First challenges ===
In 1890, Tanabe travelled to Tokyo, where he was appointed hand-to-hand instructor of the Tokyo Metropolitan Police Department under the recommendation of his close friend from Okayama Senjuro Kataoka/Kanaya of the Takenouchi-ryū school and inventor of Ashi Garami and leg scissor strangles. Here he trained with him and other Takenouchi-ryū masters like Kotaro Imai and Hikosaburo Oshima. It would be in January 1891, however, when he became famous due to a challenge fight against a fellow police instructor, 3rd dan Kodokan Judoka and Tenjin Shin'yō-ryū exponent Takisaburo Tobari. The fight happened at the Hisamatsu police station and was refereed by Kanaya. During the match, Tanabe reversed an osoto makikomi attempt by Tobari, and after pinning him with kami-shiho-gatame he choked him unconscious by juji-jime choke. The match was the hardest defeat suffered by the Kodokan school against a jujutsu challenger, and it was soon made public that Tanabe had found the Kodokan style's weak point thanks to his dexterity at groundfighting.

In spring 1892, Tanabe was challenged to a rematch by Tobari in an event hosted by the Tokyo police department, again with Kanaya as the referee. Although the judoka came with improved skills and managed to block Tanabe's first tomoe nage attempt, he made the mistake to try to engage him voluntarily on the ground. Thanks to Tanabe's defense and patience, Tobari exhausted himself trying to submit him, allowing Mataemon to place him lying flat on the mat and choke him again by juji-jime. After those bouts, Tanabe appeared in the Osaka branch of the Kodokan at the kagami-biraki annual event and challenged Jigoro Kano personally, without receiving an answer. He would face more judokas after this bout, among them Yoshitsugu Yamashita, Kunisaburo Iizuka, Norimasu Iwasaki, Yuji Hirooka and Shichigoro Baba, defeating them all. His victory over Yamashita was particularly sound, as he also challenged the rest of the Kōdōkan Shitennō, but both Sakujiro Yokoyama and Tsunejiro Tomita rejected the offer. Only Shiro Saigo accepted, but the match never happened due to undisclosed reasons.

The rivalry with Tobari didn't end without a third match, celebrated in December at Kanda Izumi-cho police station. Before the fight, Tobari would have a physical altercation with another fighter, Senjuro Kanaya himself, as Tobari had challenged both him and Tanabe the same day. This offended Kanaya, who fought Tobari, both men ending up worn and battered. The match started the same way as the previous one, but this time Tanabe countered a throw attempt and scored fully his tomoe nage, following up by pinning Tobari and applying ebi-jime for the victory.

=== At the Butoku Kai ===
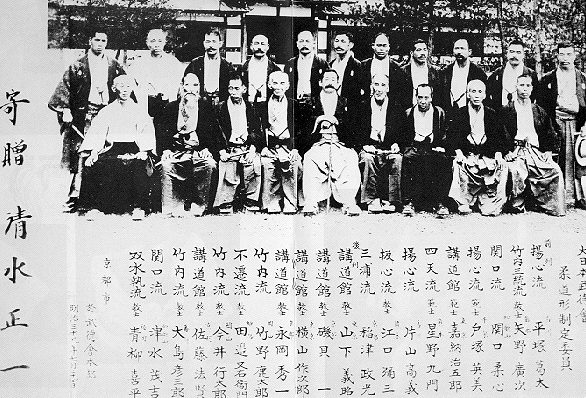
Tanabe (standing, sixth from left to right) among the jujutsu masters at the Butoku Kai

After those fights, Tanabe's renown was such that he was one of the twenty representing masters chosen in 1895 to open up the jujutsu division at the Dai Nippon Butoku Kai, an idea promoted by Kodokan founder Jigoro Kano. Tanabe taught at the Butokukai for a long time, and also competed against martial artists from other styles.

In spring 1898, Tanabe was involved in an exhibition fight in front of Prince Yoshihito in Kyoto, going against Kasumi Shin-ryū jujutsuka and 3rd dan judoka Yuji Hirooka in a rematch of a past challenge fight. Hirooka blocked Tanabe's first morote gari, but fell to the second, after which Tanabe applied an ashi garami (足挫, a name used mainly for ashi hishigi, although the technique might have been a variation of 足緘, the current canonical ashi garami included in the Kodokan katame-no-kata). Hirooka's leg was rendered injured with an audible noise before he could tap out, leaving him unable to properly walk out after the match. At the next reunion at the Butoku Kai in May, Kano proposed to forbid the technique from regular jujutsu/judo competition due to the possibility of lasting damage. Tanabe objected, noting that the entire martial art could be considered dangerous as well; however, out of all the masters of traditional jujutsu gathered, only Kaisuke Masuda from Shinnuki-ryū agreed with Tanabe, and thus the ban was decided by majority.

The same day of the reunion, Tanabe fought 3rd dan judoka Hajime Isogai under referee Masaaki Samura from Takeuchi Santo-ryū. Tanabe attempted his signature tomoe nage, and although Isogai blocked it, Tanabe managed to pull him down. The match stalled, with Isogai showing signs of fatigue first, but eventually the referee called for a draw on the basis that both opponents were tired and not making advances. Tanabe demanded for the match to continue until a finish, but the decision was not reversed.

The same year, Tanabe visited the dojo of Yataro Handa in Dojima, Osaka, a year after it was opened. Handa was a master of Daito-ryū (actually a filial of Sekiguchi-ryū; not to be confused with the late style Daitō-ryū Aiki-jūjutsu), as well as Tenjin Shinyo-ryū. Knowing Tanabe's reputation, Handa introduced him to Soji Kimotsuki, a former student of his who had joined Kodokan, and the two fought a match. It would to be the first time Tanabe lost a bout against a judoka, as Kimotsuki threw him on his head with deashi barai and knocked him out. The Fusen-ryū master got his retribution the next day by sitting on the mat and goading Kimotsuki to meet him on the ground, where he choked him out (according to another version, Tanabe reversed an uchi mata with a kuchiki taoshi to pull Kimotsuki to the mat). After those matches, Tanabe and Kimotsuki became friends and training partners, and Mataemon became also a usual teacher in Handa's dojo.

In May 1899, Tanabe would fight another Kodokan judoka, the regarded Shuichi Nagaoka, also refereed by Samura. Tanabe almost locked a juji-gatame at one point, but his body got out of the tatami bounds, making the referee restart the match on the center. Tanabe disagreed with this decision and abandoned the match, after which Samura called for another draw. Mataemon then rematched Isogai in Fukuoka, but this time Tanabe was unable to take the fight to the ground and was repeatedly threatened by Isogai's mastery with the hane goshi. The match was ultimately declared a draw again.

=== Last matches ===
In May 1900, Tanabe had his third and last match against Hajime Isogai, challenging him to an event that was going to take place in Okayama, Mataemon's land. The bout would be refereed by Kotaro Imai, Takenouchi-ryū exponent and Isogai's personal enemy. However, this time Isogai had trained with Kaichiro Samura, a ground expert judoka originally from Takenouchi Santo-ryū (as well as the elder son of the aforementioned Masaaki Samura), and had greatly improved his ne-waza skills. After a lengthy ground battle in which Isogai gradually started to dominate, Mataemon reportedly tried to drag them both out of the tatami zone in order to force a restart, but Isogai dragged them back while the crowd cried for a tie. At the end, Imai stopped the fight and declared a draw. Tanabe claimed to be suffering from hemorrhoids to explain his performance, though he also commended Isogai's effort.

Tanabe always declined to officially join the Kodokan school, even although his own acquitances pressed him into such, but it's known that he was friends and usual training partners with judokas Yuji Hirooka and Soji Kimotsuki. It is also possible, but not proven, that he was directly hired by Jigoro Kano to teach his ne-waza style in the Kodokan. He was appointed judo kyoshi in 1906, teaching at the Butoku Kai until his retirement in 1922, and was promoted to hanshi in 1927. Tanabe died in 1942 in Osaka. Years after his death, his career was praised by judo historian Takeshi Kuroda, who called him "the last great jujutsuka" and a figure of utmost importance for the history of Kodokan. He was the inspiration for the character Gennosuke Higaki in Tsuneo Tomita's popular novel series Sanshiro Sugata.

His heir Teruo later joined the Kodokan, placing second at the 1931 All Japan Judo Championships after Shuzan Takahashi and eventually reaching the 8º dan.
