= Takisaburo Tobari =

Japanese martial artist

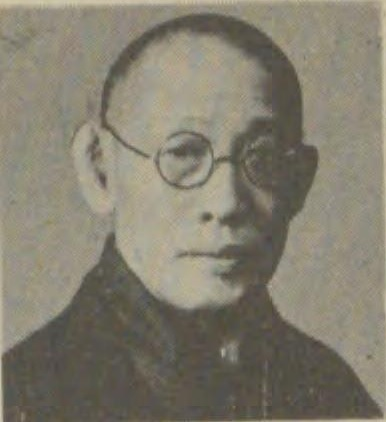
- Born: 1866; Totsuka, Saitama, Japan
- Died: Unknown; Japan
- Native name: 戸張瀧三郎
- Nationality: Japanese
- Style: Tenjin Shin'yō-ryū; Judo
- Teachers: Mataichiro Iso; Kentaro Inoue; Jigoro Kano

Other information
- Spouse: Kazu Tobari
- Notable students: Kazu Tobari; Morihei Ueshiba

Takisaburo Tobari (戸張瀧三郎, Tobari Takisaburo; 1866–?) was a Japanese jujutsu and judo practitioner. He was one of the earliest members of Kodokan.

== Biography ==
Born in 1865, Tobari graduated as a jujutsuka of the Tenjin Shin'yō-ryū school in Edo, later known as Tokyo. He trained under Kentaro Inoue, the same master as Sakujiro Yokoyama, and like Yokoyama himself, Tobari would join Jigoro Kano's Kodokan school, becoming an early judoka. After reaching the 3rd dan, he was placed as a hand-to-hand teacher at the Tokyo Metropolitan Police Department, along with other practitioners of judo and jujutsu.

=== Challenge matches ===
In January 1891, Tobari fought a challenge match against a fellow professor, Mataemon Tanabe from the Fusen-ryū jujutsu school, in the police station of Hisamatsu. During the bout, although Tobari was significantly heavier than his opponent, Tanabe reversed an osoto makikomi attempt, and after Tanabe pinned him with kami-shiho-gatame, the judoka was choked unconscious by juji-jime choke. The match was the hardest defeat suffered by the Kodokan school against a jujutsu challenger at the time.

In spring 1892, having feverishly worked in his grappling skills, Tobari challenged Tanabe in order to avenge his loss. Although Tobari successfully blocked Tanabe's signature tomoe nage, he committed the mistake to voluntarily engage him on the ground. Pitted against Tanabe's strong defense and patience, Tobari exhausted himself trying to submit him, allowing Mataemon to place him lying flat on the mat and choke him again by juji-jime.

The rivalry with Tanabe didn't end without a third match, celebrated in December at Kanda Izumi-cho police station. Before the fight, however, Tobari would have a physical altercation with another fighter, Takenouchi-ryū exponent Senjuro Kanaya, who had served as the referee in the previous two bouts. Tobari challenged both him and Tanabe the same day, which offended Kanaya into a brawl, leaving both of them worn and battered. The match started the same way as the previous one, but this time Tanabe countered a throw attempt and scored fully his tomoe nage, following up by pinning Tobari and applying ebi-jime for the victory.

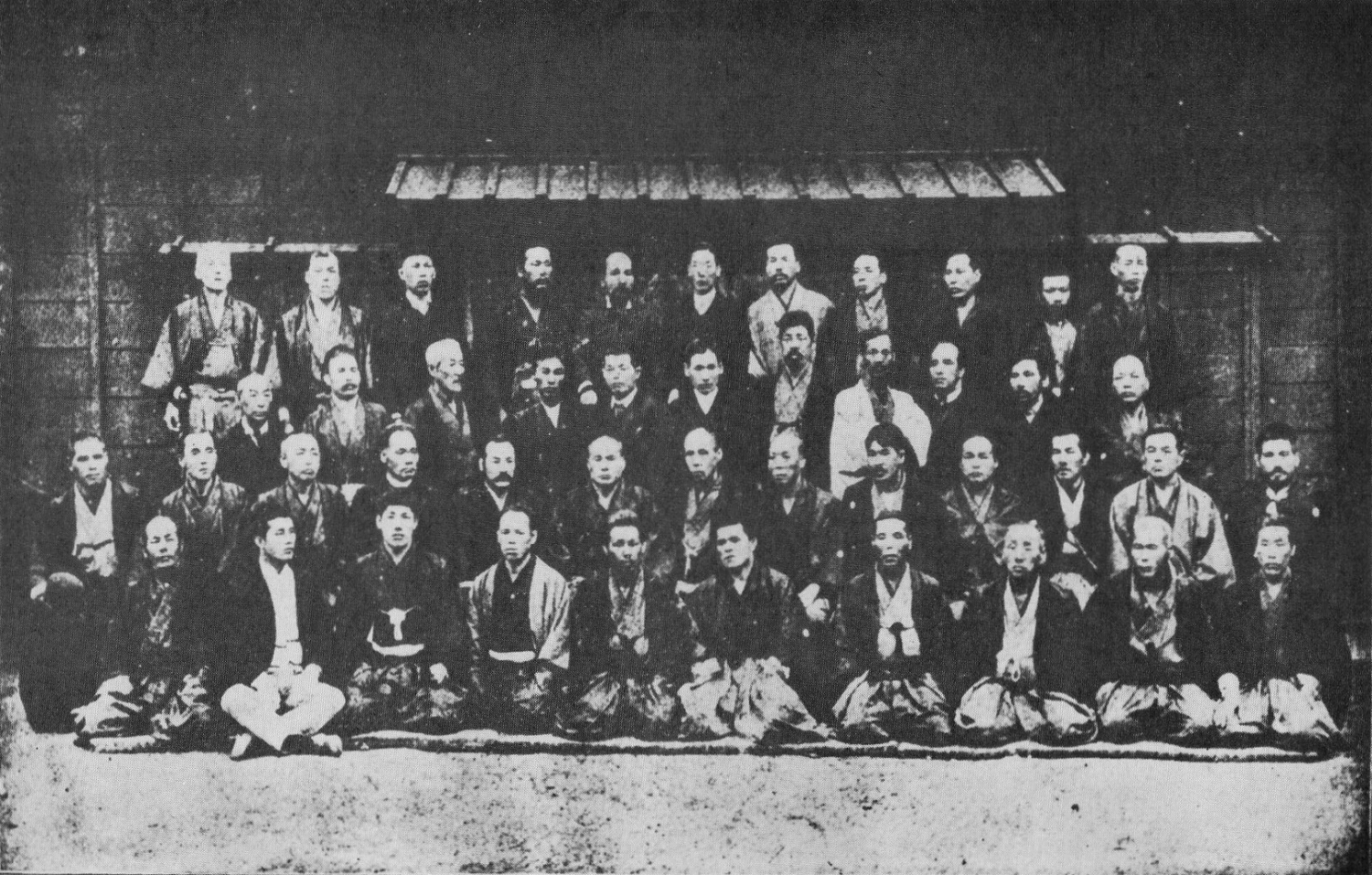
Tobari (first row, eighth from the right) among other jujutsu masters in 1888.

Immediately after losing to Tanabe, Tobari fought Kanaya too as he had intended. This time their ground skill was evenly matched, and after 30 minutes, the referee declared a draw or hikiwake. Kanaya was offended again, as Tobari had demanded Tanabe to fight for any time as it was needed to get a finish, and Senjuro believed they should fight the same way. While Kanaya was berating the referee, Tobari suddenly grabbed him and threw him down, shouting that he would please him if he wanted to keep the match going. The action drew laughs from the crowd, after which a Kanaya finally accepted the draw. Tobari left his job at the Metropolitan police shortly after, possibly due to the incidents of the day.

Despite Tobari's losses against him, his fighting spirit was praised by Tanabe himself, especially in comparison to other judoka.

=== Later life ===
In 1904, Tobari toured through Europe for five years, where he learned the Austrian system of osteopathy of Heil-Gymnastik.

Tobari taught his martial expertise to his wife Kazu, who succeeded him in the lineage of Tenjin Shin'yō-ryū.
