= Doshin =

Doshin may refer to:

- Dōshin, low-ranking officials of the Tokugawa shogunate in Edo period Japan
- Doshin the Giant, a Nintendo god simulation game for the Nintendo 64DD and GameCube
- Doshin So (1911–1980), creator and founder of Shorinji Kempo, a Japanese martial art
- Hokkaido Shimbun, abbreviated to Dōshin, regional newspaper in Hokkaidō, Japan

== See also ==
- Onmitsu Dōshin Ōedo Sōsamō, a 1979 film
