= Byakuren Kaikan =

Combat sports organization

- Focus: Hybrid
- Hardness: Full-contact
- Country of origin: Japan
- Creator: Sugihara Masayasu
- Famous practitioners: Takehiro Minami, Takatugu Naito, Shoto Yamaguchi, Masato Fukuchi, Yuto Fukuchi, Chisato Yamaguchi, Yuyu Kitajima, Reza Goodary, Pouya Salehi Chakousari, Akbar Abbasi, Asghar Jabari, Mehrdad Ramezani, Judd Reid
- Parenthood: Shorinji Kempo

The Byakuren Kaikan (Japanese: 白蓮会館 - literally translated: "White Lotus Association") or Byakuren Karate is a full contact karate style founded in 1984 by Sugihara Masayasu (Japanese: 杉原 正康).

The Byakuren Kaikan is a member of the Japan Fullcontact Karate Organization (JFKO)

The Byakuren Kaikan is registered in Japan as a nonprofit organization (NPO).

== History ==
Despite being classified as a Karate school its origins date actually back to the Shorinji Kempo, a martial art considered to be derived from Shaolin Kung Fu. Henceforth, Byakuren Kaikan, much like its parent, divides the techniques into two main categories: Gōhō (剛法 - i.e. "hard techniques": punches, kicks, etc.) and Jūhō (柔法 - "soft techniques": throws, joint locks, etc.).

Sugihara Masayasu (Born in Osaka, Japan, In 1951) started practicing Judo and Karate from a very young age, and eventually discovered and trained mainly under Shorinji Kempo. By the age of 28, Sugihara held a 6th Dan rank in the art, and he was a bodyguard and close student of the founder of Shorinji Kenpo Dōshin Sō. This martial art did not allow its followers to take part in contact competitions but Sugihara, eager to test his fighting skills against real opponents, decided to enroll anyway in a Karate contest. In 1983 he joined a national tournament organized by the Seidō Kaikan using "Byakuren Kaikan" as pseudonym for his school. Although he ended up among the winners the truth was soon to be discovered and to avoid further trouble to the Shorinji Kenpo organization he decided in 1984 to establish his own style which he called "International Karate-Kempo Federation Byakuren".

There are three reasons why the name was chosen: the bodyguard corps which he belonged to in Shorinji Kempo was called "Byakuren"(White Lotus), it was also the name of a technique of the martial art; furthermore, since he was about to undertake a new path in Karate, he would have had to start from the very beginning using the white belt.

Despite the rather acrimonious split from the Shorinji Kempo organization, Sugihara expressed great gratitude for his previous master.

Unlike many other schools of the time, since its foundation the members of Byakuren began to participate in many competitions organized by other styles, becoming a new contender on the scene. In the full contact karate environment Sugihara will earn the title of "Fighting Master" and "invader".

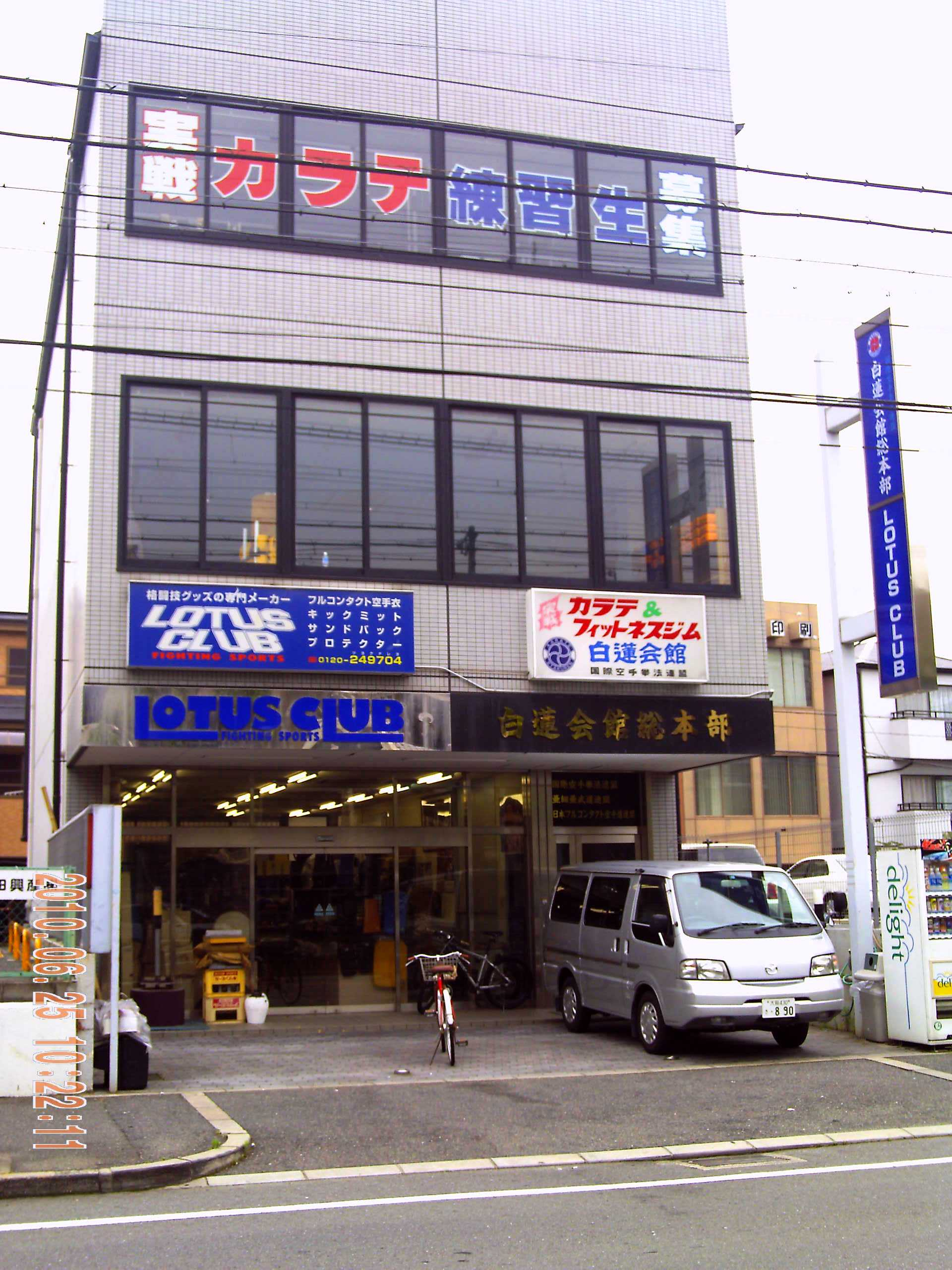
Headquarters in Osaka

Since 1985 the Byakuren Kaikan regularly organizes regional and national Full Contact Karate tournaments.

In 2004, on the 20th anniversary of the foundation, the Byakuren Kaikan organized its first world Karate tournament in Osaka.

Currently the style is present with schools all over Japan and in the following countries: Russia, the Netherlands, Belgium, France, Italy, Spain, India, Sri Lanka, Canada, USA, New Zealand, Korea, Hong Kong, United Arab Emirates (UAE)

== Techniques and Training ==
Practice in Byakuren Karate can be divided into four main categories:

Gōhō (剛法): i.e. "hard techniques". These include punches, kicks, knee and elbow strikes. Students are also taught how to dodge, block, counterattack and in a final phase how to anticipate the intentions of the opponent.

Jūhō (柔法): the "soft techniques" are mostly focused on self-defense. They include throws, pins, joint locks and submission techniques.

Muscle strengthening and physical training: Byakuren Karate in strongly aimed at competition matches, therefore the curriculum includes many exercises to improve endurance, speed and power.

Tameshiwari (試割り): for artistic and demonstration purposes at the highest levels breaking techniques are also imparted.

Byakuren Karate employs the principles of Sabaki (体さばき) for dodging and counterattack the opponent. The fighting pose is relaxed and natural.

Since competition rules include winning by K.O. great emphasis is placed on Kumite (組手 - fighting with a real opponent) which is integral part of the training since the lower grades.

The employment of Kata (型) is more limited compared to more traditional Karate styles. There is a number of customized katas mainly performed during tests for upgrading to the next belt.

The rules for competition are those of the traditional Japanese Full Contact Karate as established by the Kyokushin Kaikan: upper limb strikes are prohibited to neck and face, attacks with the lower limbs can also be thrown to the head instead; it is forbidden to pull or grab the opponent, hitting the genitals or the knees directly from the front.

In training and matches protectors are worn on legs, knees, hands and genitals. No protectors are employed in competitions among black belts.

== Philosophy ==
Despite being highly focused on competition, the Association values are based on humility, respect and altruism. Seriousness and dedication is required while training but also to be able to recognize one's own limits in order to avoid injuries.

The ultimate purpose of the dōjō is not to produce absolute champions but to cultivate personal growth. The goal is to ensure that what is learned at the Byakuren Kaikan be brought in one's everyday life in order to be helpful.
