= Tsunetane Oda =

Japanese judoka

Oda Tsunetane
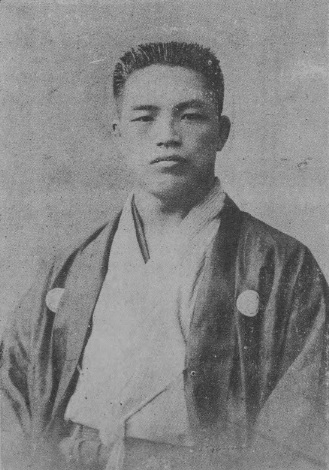
- Born: Oda Tsunetane; March 10, 1892; Yamanashi Prefecture, Japan
- Died: February 11, 1955 (aged 62)
- Native name: 小田常胤
- Style: Judo
- Teachers: Kotaro Okano, Kanō Jigorō; Kyuzo Mifune
- Rank: Judo: 9th Dan

Tsunetane Oda (小田常胤, Oda Tsunetane; March 10, 1892 – February 11, 1955) was a judoka who was influential in the development of Kosen judo. His correct name was Tsunetane Oda, but through a misinterpretation of the kanji 常胤 he is more commonly known as Join.

== Biography ==
Oda was born in Yamanashi Prefecture, Honshu, Japan in 1892. He started studying judo in 1909 at the age of 17 at Numazu Kōtō senmon gakkō (高等専門学校, Higher Special School), joining the Kodokan the following year and receiving his 1st Dan in 1911.

== Judo career ==
He excelled at newaza (ground work) and felt that it warranted greater emphasis than the Kodokan gave it. He worked with Hajime Isogai to develop the groundwork-emphasizing style of judo taught at the Kōtō senmon gakkō schools, known as kosen judo. It is said that Oda vision of newaza completed that of Kano's.

Although sources often cite Yaichibei Kanemitsu on his place, Oda is sometimes credited with developing the strangulation technique sankaku-jime (三角絞). This technique has been adopted into other martial arts and fighting systems including Brazilian jiu-jitsu, and mixed martial arts. The triangle choke was said to be able to be applied in most directions.

Oda was awarded the rank of 9th dan in judo in 1948 and died in 1955.

== Bibliography ==
- Oda, Tsunetane (1919), Jūdō wa Kakushite Kate (柔道は斯うして勝て)
- Oda, Tsunetane (1941), Jūdō Taikan (柔道大觀)
- Oda, Tsunetane (1949), Jūdō wa Kakushite Susume (柔道は斯うして進め)
- Oda, Tsunetane (1950), Jūdō Manabu Hito no Tame ni (柔道―学ぶ人のために)
