= Kanemitsu =

Kanemitsu (written: 金光) is a Japanese surname. Notable people with the surname include:

- Matsumi Kanemitsu (1922–1992), Japanese-American painter
- Tsuneo Kanemitsu (金光 庸夫, 1877–1955), Japanese businessman and politician
- Yaichihyōe Kanemitsu (1892–1966), Japanese judoka

== See also ==
- Kanemitsu Bakery, a bakery of Hawaii, United States
