= Triangle choke =

Judo technique

Triangle Choke
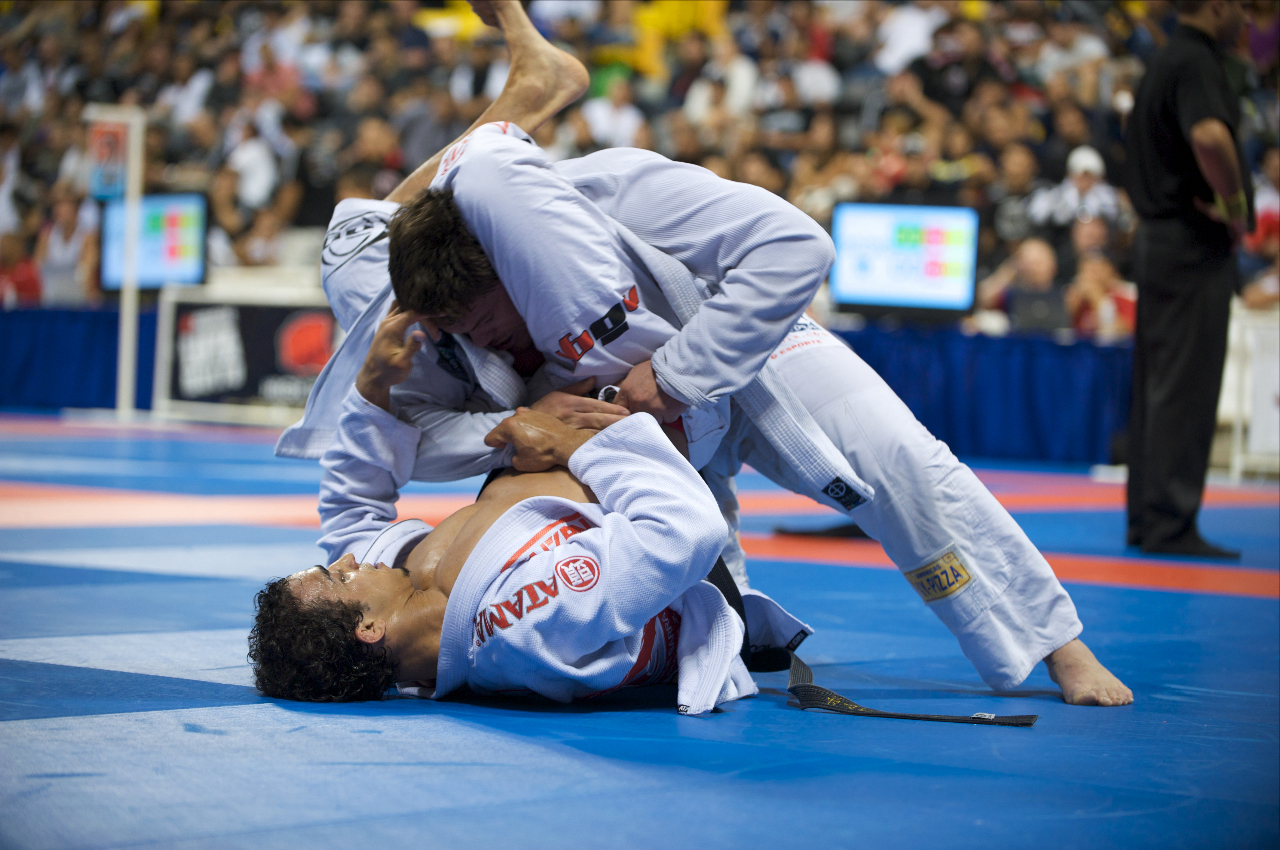
- A triangle choke attempt in a Brazilian jiu-jitsu competition
- Classification: Chokehold
- Style: Judo, Brazilian Jiu-Jitsu, Sambo, No-gi grappling
- AKA: Sankaku-Jime, Triangle Choke
- Parent hold: Guard

A triangle choke (Japanese: 三角絞 sankaku-jime), is a type of figure-four chokehold that encircles the opponent's neck and one of their arms within the legs of the attacker. The configuration of the legs is similar to the shape of a triangle. Applying pressure using both legs and the opponent's own arm/shoulder, the technique is a type of lateral vascular restraint that constricts the blood flow from the carotid arteries to the brain, resulting in loss of consciousness in seconds when applied correctly. Recent studies have shown that the triangle choke takes an average of 9.5 seconds to render an opponent unconscious from the moment it is properly applied.

== History ==
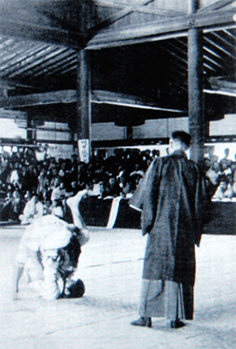
Historical Kosen judo triangle choke

The triangle choke was seen in early kosen judo competition. While details of its origin are unknown, it is strongly associated to Yaichibei Kanemitsu and his apprentice Masaru Hayakawa, who featured the first registered use of the move in a kosen judo tournament in Kobe, Hyogo in November 1921. Earlier names for the technique would have been matsuba-gatame (松葉固め), sankaku-garami (三角緘み) or sankaku-gyaku (三角逆) before finally settling down on sankaku-jime (三角絞め). According to Kanemitsu himself, a primitive version of the move had been shown by Takenouchi-ryū master Senjuro Kanaya around 1890, though it was apparently a simpler form of neckscissors without the posterior triangle action. The sankaku-jime was officially adopted and endorsed by important judokas like Masami Oyama, and soon met plenty of use both in kosen judo and mainstream judo. Tsunetane Oda, a fellow kosen judoka, demonstrated the technique on video and is also credited with the creation of the move in some sources.

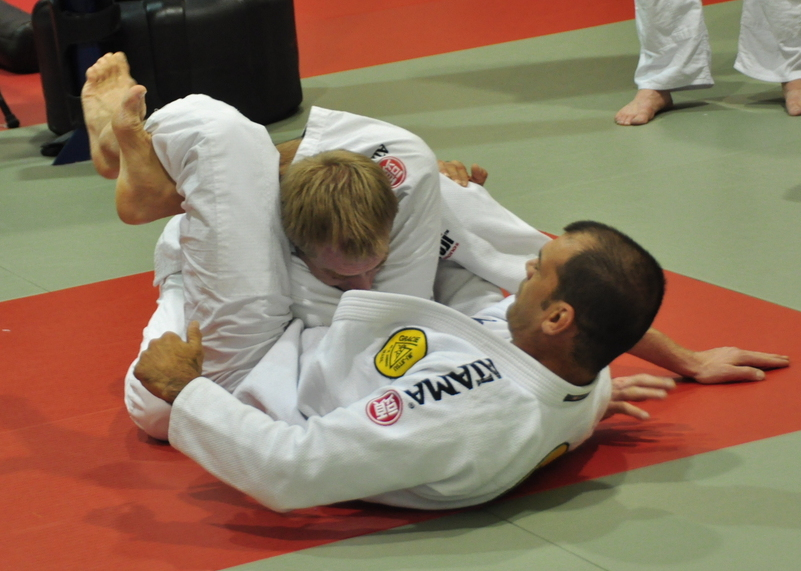
Brazilian jiu-jitsu practitioner Megaton Dias demonstrating a triangle choke

The first reported variation was the front triangle choke or mae-sankaku-jime (前三角絞め), applied from the position known in modern times as guard, often after a pull down or hikikomi (引込). Another variation was the horizontal triangle or yoko-sankaku-jime (横三角絞め), performed from the side. Martial arts historian Toshiya Masuda has attributed its innovation to Masahiko Kimura, who would have created it during the Takudai kosen judo tournament at Takushoku University and accomplished prolonged success with it, though he also deems probable that Kimura only popularized the variation instead of creating it. The inverted variation or ushiro-sankaku-jime (後三角絞め), typically seen in modern judo competition, was the next addition, preceding many others.

Among those variations, the front triangle is particularly favored by practitioners of Brazilian jiu-jitsu. According to a popular belief maintained by Romero Cavalcanti, the technique was introduced in Brazilian jiu-jitsu by Rolls Gracie after finding it in a judo book. Márcio "Macarrão" Stambowsky, who was named by Rickson Gracie as one of the earliest Brazilian competitors to popularize the concept, has also credited Rolls. Other sources, like Toshiya Masuda and Roberto Pedreira, believe it might have been introduced in Brazil much earlier by Yasuichi and Naoichi Ono, disciples of Yaichibei Kanemitsu himself, as well as possibly other judo practitioners like Ryuzo Ogawa. Rolls trainee Mario Tallarico lends credibility to this theory, as does a 1935 newspaper clipping that depicts Yasuichi Ono performing a Triangle Choke in his training for an upcoming fight with Helio Gracie.

The triangle choke was seen in Japanese shoot wrestling in the 1980s. The triangle choke was first shown in mixed martial arts on March 11, 1994, when Jason Delucia used a triangle to defeat Scott Baker at UFC 2. This variation has remained as the most commonly seen in MMA, although the side or inverted triangle has been also used; on September 26, 1995, Shooto fighter Rumina Sato submitted Isamu Osugi with a flying inverted triangle choke. Many years later, Toby Imada won 2009 Submission of the Year with an inverted triangle choke over Jorge Masvidal at Bellator 5. Even more complex holds, like Chris Lytle's inverted mounted triangle/straight armbar combination at UFC 116 in 2010, have also surfaced.

== Technique ==
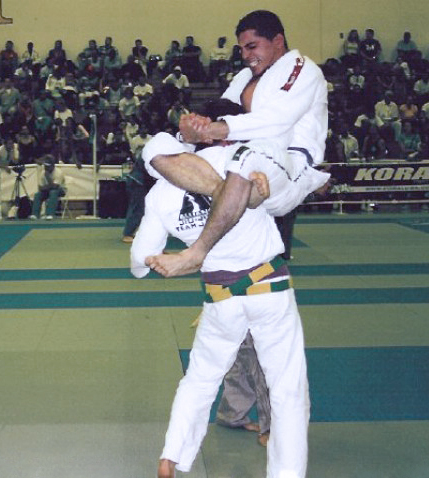
Brazilian jiu-jitsu black belt Marcos Torregrosa landing a flying triangle choke.

Tactically speaking, the triangle choke is a very effective attack employed from the bottom position, generally applied from the guard. The choke can also be applied in the mount, side mount and back mount positions by more advanced grappling practitioners. A flying triangle choke is performed when the attacker leaps into the air to apply the hold on a standing opponent.

=== Defence ===
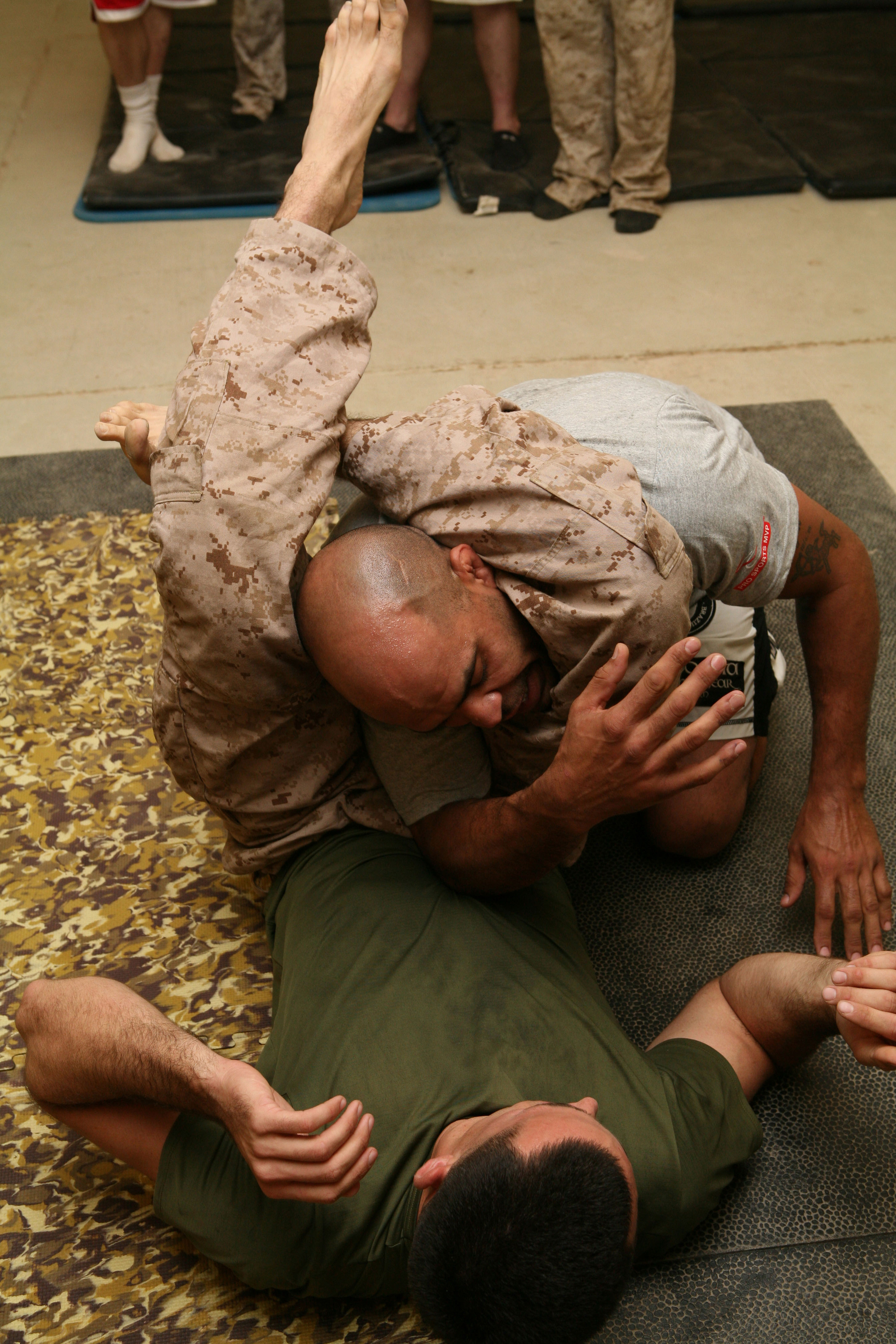
A demonstration of the triangle choke

To escape a triangle choke, the defending practitioner must first elevate their head so as to preclude the full force of the submission, and subsequently must bring their arm away from opposition with their own carotid artery. Once out of immediate danger of loss of consciousness, the practitioner can concentrate on reversing or escaping the figure-four lock. One method for this is to break the opponent's legs apart. With the opposing practitioner applying the choke in a bottom guard position, the defender should start to stand up, with both hands stacked and bearing weight on or above the breast opposite the arm in the choke (or gripping the collar of the opponent's gi). When the defender is nearly standing and leaning over so as to bring their weight to bear on their opponent, the defender should start to walk to the side opposite the captured arm. This pushes the defender's back and shoulder into the leg wrapped around their back, and forces the opponent's other leg to reach forward to maintain the lock. This weakens the strength of the choke and allows the defender to muscle out or force the attacker to release the choke.

In some rule sets such as mixed martial arts, it is possible for the defender to lift the person applying the choke and to slam them to the ground in an attempt to get them to release the hold. In many grappling rule sets such slams are not allowed.

== See also ==
- Arm triangle choke
- List of Brazilian jiu-jitsu techniques
- List of judo techniques
- Ground fighting
