= Yaichihyōe Kanemitsu =

Japanese judoka (1892–1966)

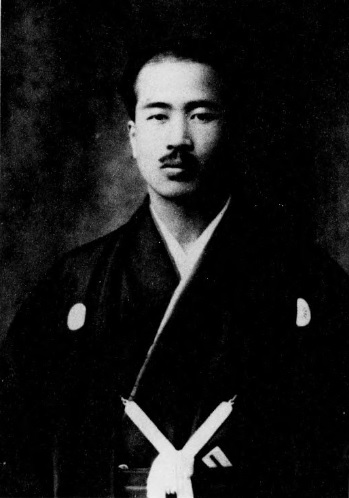
- Born: Kanemitsu Yaichihyōe; March 30, 1892; Okayama, Japan
- Died: December 25, 1966 (aged 74)
- Native name: 金光弥一兵衛
- Style: Judo, Takenouchi-ryū, Kitō-ryū
- Teachers: Shuichi Nagaoka; Shotaro Tabata; Kotaro Imai; Shigetaro Kishimoto
- Rank: Judo: 9th Dan

Yaichihyōe Kanemitsu (金光 弥一兵衛, Kanemitsu Yaichihyōe; March 30, 1892 – December 25, 1966) was a judoka who was influential in the development of kosen judo. He is credited with the invention of judo techniques like sankaku-jime and hiza-juji-gatame, which were subsequently incorporated into other disciplines, including sambo, Brazilian jiu jitsu and mixed martial arts. He was also known as the teacher of Yasuichi and Naoichi Ono, who took part in the earlier Brazilian vale tudo scene.

== Biography ==
=== Early life ===
Kanemitsu was born in Okayama Prefecture, Japan in 1892. He started training in traditional jiu-jitsu as a child, learning the styles of Kitō-ryū under Shigetaro Kishimoto and Takenouchi-ryū under Kotaro Imai. After moving to Tokyo in 1910, he joined the Kodokan school and completed his training at the Dai Nippon Butoku Kai and the Budo Senmon Gakko, where he trained under Shuichi Nagaoka and Shotaro Tabata. His previous knowledge about jiu-jitsu was such that he received a shodan or black belt in just 48 days, after which he became a teacher in several schools and universities.

=== Kosen judo ===
He was especially active in the kosen judo environment of Okayama, Nagoya and Tohoku, standing out as the third greatest figure of this competition only behind Hajime Isogai and Tsunetane Oda. Kanemitsu had a particular rivalry with Oda, being referred together as "Higashi no Oda" (東の小田, "Oda of the East") and "Nishi no Kanemitsu" (西の金光, "Kanemitsu of the West") due to their respective teaching places.

In July 1921, just before the 8º national kosen taikai or interschool competition, Kanemitsu was appointed judo teacher at the koto senmon gakko of Okayama (currently Okayama Asahi High School) while Oda was at its Kanazawa counterpart (currently Kanazawa University). This led to an inevitable confrontation between their teams, adding to the fact that the Kanazawa school was having a seven years winning streak that many other schools wanted to break. The day of the tournament, Kanemitsu's team met Oda's at the semi-finals in an event which lasted from the morning to the night. A turmoil took place when the Okayama team put to use a new submission hold taught to them by Kanemitsu, the hiza-juji-gatame (膝十字固め), which the Kanazawa side protested to be too similar to ashi garami, a technique banned in 1916. The referee, Hajime Isogai himself, gathered a joint of judges to evaluate the technique, but they decided it was legal under kosen rules, which at the time still allowed most leglocks. The final match between the two schools saw Noboru Hayakawa, 1º dan under Kanemitsu, facing Rakuzo Satomura, 2º dan under Oda, in a bout that lasted one hour and 40 minutes before being declared a draw. As neither Okayama nor Kanazawa had the victory, they were both eliminated and the Kumamoto school was declared winner by default after winning its own semi-finals tournament match.

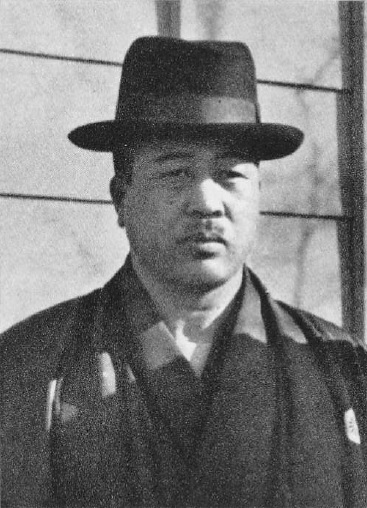
Kanemitsu in 1924.

The next year, the Okayama school led by Kanemitsu finally defeated Kanazawa. Victory was accomplished in a large part by the introduction of yet another new technique, the sankaku-jime (三角絞), which has been speculated to have been innovated by Yaichihyōe and his student Masaru Hayakawa, Noboru's younger brother, as well as other apprentices like Katsusaburo Ichinomiya and Tokubei Takahashi. Not only breaking the Kanazawa school's winning streak, the Okayama koto senmon gakko under Kanemitsu went to have its own streak, conquering the national kosen taikai eight times from 1922 to 1929. The sankaku-jime was officially adopted and endorsed by the president of the Kagawa Prefectural Judo Federation, Shozo Oyama, and soon met plenty of use both in kosen judo and in mainstream judo.

In 1923, now a 5th dan, Kanemitsu opened the Genbukan Chuo Dojo (later known as Genryukai Dojo) in Okayama, patterned after the Genbukan Dojo opened by his former master Kishimoto. Many successful judoka would be trained there, among them Toshiji Oshima, Chikao Nogami and future 9th dan Kame Nishida.

=== Late career ===
In 1924, Kanemitsu took part in the first judo tournament of the Meiji Shrine Games and obtained victory in its senior category. He submitted 5th dan Kazuo Yamauchi by okuri eri jime, pinned Sumitake Shinmen with yoko-shiho-gatame, and went to fight the feared Tokyo judoka Shojiro Hashimoto, who was thought to be as proficient on his feet as Kanemitsu was on the ground. They fought for 20 minutes to no avail and the referee Shuichi Nagaoka called a draw, but their match had been met with so much enthusiasm by the crowd and judges alike that another extra round was granted. This time, Hashimoto tried to finish with ouchi gari, but Kanemitsu countered and took him to the ground, where he pinned him with kami-shiho-gatame for the win.

In 1940, at 8º dan, Kanemitsu was chosen to perform a judo exhibition in front of the Emperor Showa, being paired with Shinaichi Amano. Afterwards, he worked as a judo instructor for the Okayama police department, a job he kept for several years. One of his last trainees would be Jon Bluming, the top foreign judoka at his time.

== Death ==
Kanemitsu died in 1966 at 77 years old and 9º dan, counting the Order of the Rising Sun among his accomplishments. His final rank was criticized by judo writer Takeshi Kuroda, who described Kanemitsu as undoubtedly worthy of the prestigious 10º dan.

== Bibliography ==
- Kanemitsu, Yaichihyōe (1953), Jūdō no Hongi (柔道の本義)
- Kanemitsu, Yaichihyōe (1958), Okayama Ken Jūdō Shi (岡山県柔道史)
