= Kata juji jime =

Judo technique

- Classification: Katame-waza
- Sub classification: Shime-waza
- Targets: Carotid arteries
- Kodokan: Yes

Technique name
- Rōmaji: Kata juji jime
- Japanese: 片十字絞
- English: Half cross strangle

Kata Jūji-jime (片十字絞) is a chokehold in judo. It is one of the twelve constriction techniques of Kodokan Judo in the

Shime-waza list. In The Canon Of Judo, it is called Katate-Juji-Jime.

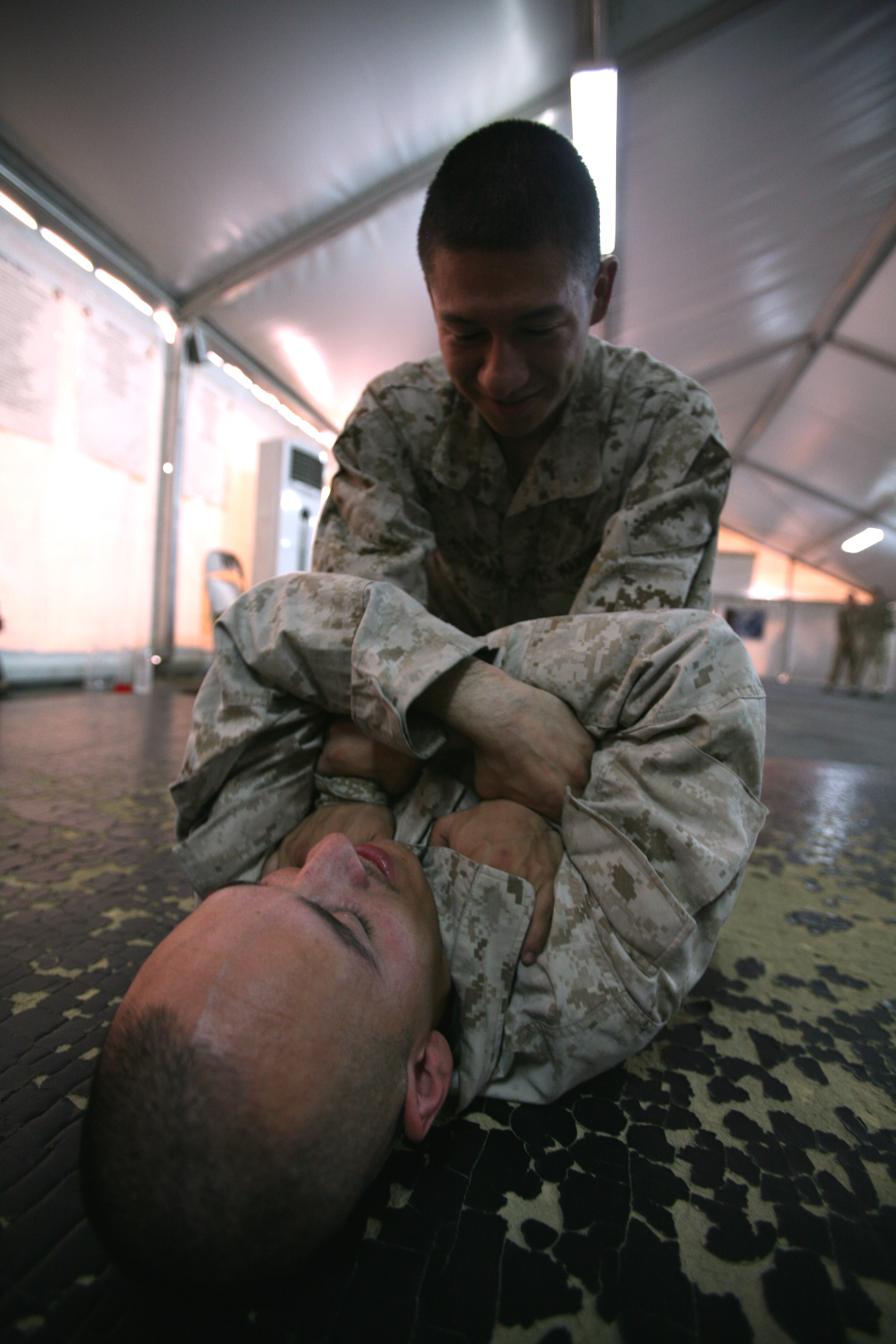
Grabbing the opponent's hands is the simpliest way to prevent the collar choke

The technique is called a 'half cross strangle' because the palm of one hand of the person applying the choke is facing the person who is applying the choke and the back of other hand is facing the person applying the choke. The hands are high up each side of the neck. Scissoring the hands applies pressure to the carotid arteries reducing blood flow, rapidly resulting in loss of consciousness. In judo, this technique is always taught under supervision and is similarly closely observed by referees in competition.

== Gallery ==
Collar choke from guard

Collar choke from mount

== Similar techniques, variants, and aliases ==
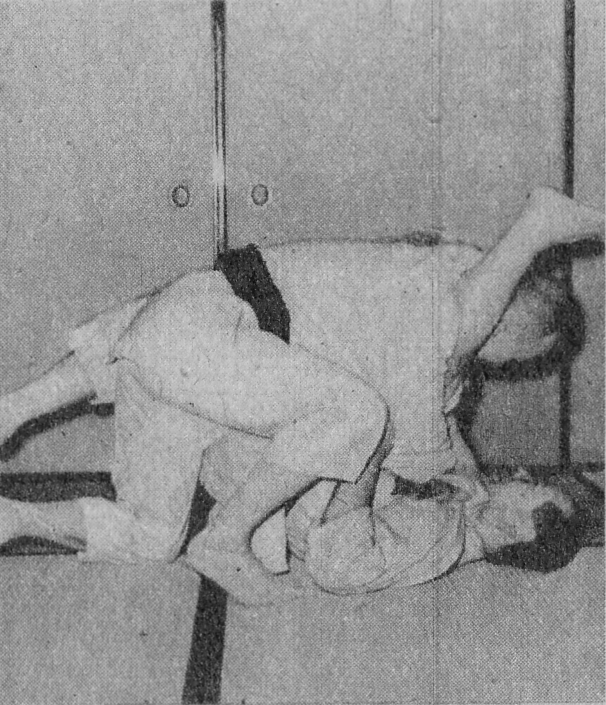
Teruo Tanabe, Mataemon Tanabe's successor, demonstrating ebi-gatame in 1953.

=== variants ===
- Ebi-gatame (海老固め) or ebi-jime (海老絞)
- Paper cutter choke
- Bat jime(Baseball bat choke, Baseball choke, バット絞)

Chokehold handed down by Kokuji Honda(born in 1925) to the Judo Club of Tohoku University.

=== Similar techniques ===
- Nami-Juji-Jime
- Gyaku-Juji-Jime

=== Aliases ===
- Cross choke
- X choke

== See also ==
- The Canon Of Judo
