= Oya Soichi Bunko =

Japanese library

Coordinates: 35°39′52.47″N 139°37′9.46″E

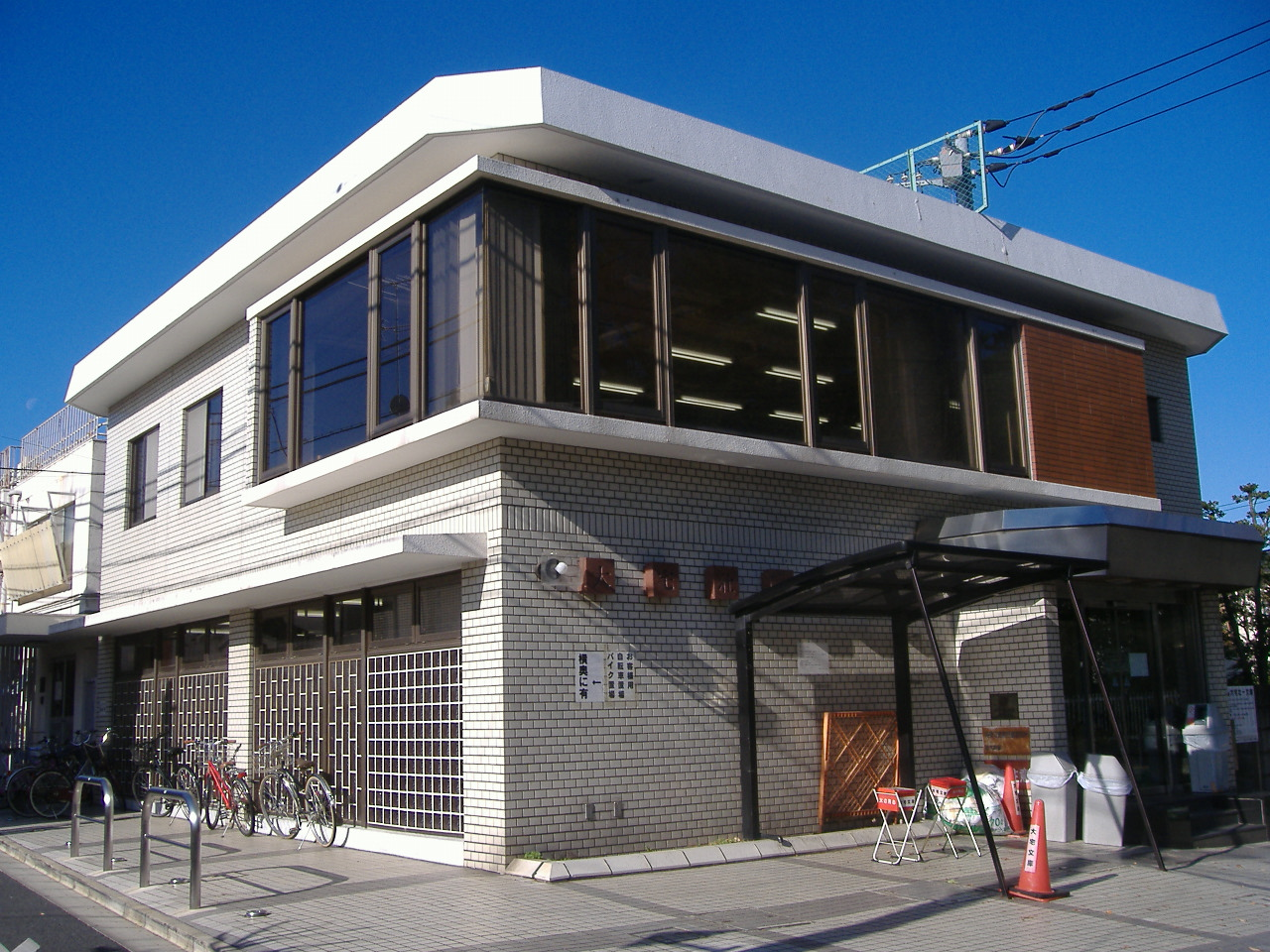
Oya Soichi Bunko

Soichi Bunko is a library in Japan that holds the popular, non-academic magazines and books collected and prized by Oya Soichi, with continuations of the collection after he died. Magazines include those about the popular culture of the day. Oya Soichi played an important role as a social critic for 50 years, during which time he published translations, anthologies, and books and also accumulated over 200,000 magazines, journals, and books. After he died in 1970, Oya Soichi Bunko was founded in Hachimanyama, Tokyo and later in Ogose, Saitama in an effort to catalog the books written by Oya Soichi as well as make available his own significant body of work.

== Collection ==
As of March 2005, Oya Soichi Bunko holds over 640,000 volumes of 10,000 magazines titles and 70,000 books.

Magazines, ranging from the Meiji period to the present, are located in the Setagaya Main Library. The catalog mainly comprises popular magazines, including apparel, cosmetics, gossip, lifestyle, cooking, health, hobbies, sports, arts, music, literature, entertainment, and travel. A few additional collections cover politics, economics, science, history, education, and criticism. Most of the magazines are contributions from publishing companies and individuals.

70,000 books are stored in the Ogose Branch Library in Saitama prefecture. Oya’s book collection does not contain primarily academic works. Instead, he preferred to collect books that were minor, trivial and uninteresting to some people because he considered those books great ingredients for his articles. As such, his library is an invaluable resource for scholars and reporters interested in the popular culture of the past 130 years in Japan.

== Index ==
The Oya collection is divided into two indexes: one of persons and the other of topics. There are currently over 120,000 persons and 7,000 topics represented in the collection. The Index Ranking on their web page, gives the users a hint of various indexes but also provides a brief overview of the Japanese social trends for the past few decades.

== User information ==
Users are not allowed to remove items from the library, but can browse and read them in the library's reading room. Users are not permitted in the stacks in the Oya Soichi Bunko Libraries; instead, librarians retrieve articles upon request. The articles are non-circulating but can be copied for ¥100 per page. The monochrome articles can also be sent by mail for ¥600 or colored articles for ¥700 per page, excluding shipping charges. Members of Oya Soichi Bunko can also request that articles be faxed at a cost of ¥600 per page plus a service charge.

As of 2005, the daily admission fee of ¥500 allows users to browse a maximum of 10 items. In order to browse more than that, the user must pay an additional ¥300, which allows the perusal of up to 50 items per day. As a corporate or individual member, 100 items can be examined per day. However, browsing is limited to 10 items per day in the Ogose Branch Library.

Users can search the articles in four different ways. The main source is the Magazine Article Catalog that covers the Meiji period to the present. It is published every year from Books Kinokuniya and can be found in major Japanese libraries. Second, the Oya Soichi Library Magazine Index System enables users to find over 2,700,000 articles from 1988 to the present. The system is categorized into five different indexes: persons, subjects, keywords, magazines, and writers. In addition, the Magazine Article Catalog CD-ROM has been published every year since 1997. The CD-ROM ranges from 1992 to the present; it is searchable by topic, keyword, issue date, and genre of magazines. Lastly, the Web Oya Bunko is the newest search engine exclusively for educational institutions. It covers over 2,000,000 articles from 1988 to the present, with subscriptions costing a minimum of ¥12,600 per annum.

== Locations and hours ==
Setagaya Main Library

3-10-20 Hachimanyama Setagaya, Tokyo, 156-0056 JAPAN TEL +81 3 3303 2000

Accessible by foot from Hachimanyama Station on the Keiō Line

Open Monday to Saturday (except Sundays, holidays, year-end and new-year) from 10 a.m. – 6 p.m..

The circulation desk is open until 5:15 p.m. and the copying desk until 5:30.

Ogose Branch Library

28-45-2 Ueno Ogose-cho Irima-gun, Saitama prefecture, 350-0415 JAPAN TEL +81 49 277 1151

Accessible by 20 minutes walk from Ogose Station on the Tobu Ogose Subway Line

Open Monday to Friday (except Saturday, Sunday, holidays, year-end, new-year, and summer).
