= Koji Komuro =

Japanese judoka

Koji Komuro (Japanese: 小室 宏二, Komuro Kōji; born 29 July 1977) is a Japanese judoka and amateur mixed martial arts fighter.

Taught by kosen judo master Kanae Hirata, Komuro is a ne waza (ground techniques) expert known for its use of sutemi (sacrifice throws) such as variations of tomoe nage, and submission techniques like jujigatame (armlock) and sode guruma jime (circular choke with the sleeves).

He is the author of a book dedicated to ground techniques, Judo Newaza of Koji Komuro Komlock!.

== Achievements ==
Former member of the Japanese national team, Koji Komuro won several international judo competitions including the Veteran World Championship (in 2010 et 2017), the 2010 Kata World Championship with his uke Takano Kenji (in the katame no kata category), and was also awarded the bronze medal at the Kodokan Cup in 1999.

Advocating flexible thinking and believing that "one can adopt strategies from other martial arts and learn from many players," Koji Komuro also trained Brazilian Jiu-jitsu (BJJ) and obtained in 2005 a black belt under Yuki Nakai who happened to be another former student of kosen judo master Kanae Hirata. Komuro does not define himself as a BJJ practitioner, and though he trained and competed in BJJ tournaments he considered it "extra judo ne waza training" where he "concentrated on quick transitions intro groundwork from standing and explosiveness instead of practising techniques which were banned in judo competitions rules such as leglocks." Komuro's achievements in BJJ tournaments include 2nd place (-68kg) at the 2005 Rickson Gracie's Budo Challenge, losing to Leonardo Vieira (Brazil) by points.

== Mixed martial arts record ==
Professional record breakdown
4 matches	4 wins	0 losses
By submission	1	0
By decision	3	0

Res.	Record	Opponent	Method	Event	Date	Round	Time	Location	Notes
Win	4-0	Masaki Yanagisawa	Submission (armbar)	Amateur Shooto - Freshman Tournament	April 15, 2001	2	1:53	Japan	
Win	3-0	Fanjin Son	Decision (unanimous)	Amateur Shooto - Freshman Tournament	April 15, 2001	1	4:00	Japan	
Win	2-0	Satoshi Sasaki	Decision (unanimous)	Amateur Shooto - Freshman Tournament	April 15, 2001	1	4:00	Japan	
Win	1-0	Takeichi Haraguchi	Decision (unanimous)	Amateur Shooto - Freshman Tournament	April 15, 2001	1	4:00	Japan	

== Submission grappling record ==
KO PUNCHES

Result	Opponent	Method	Event	Date	Round	Time	Notes
Loss	(Japan) Norifumi Yamamoto	Decision (unanimous)	THE CONTENDERS Millennium-1	2001			
