= Toshinari Masuda =

Japanese novelist

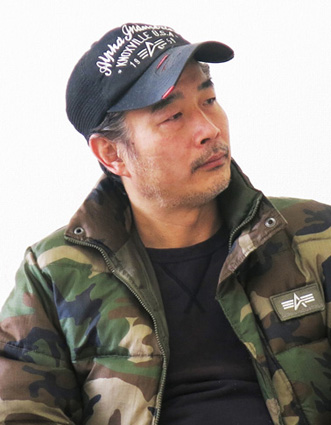
- Toshinari MASUDA (2014)
- Born: November 8, 1965 (age 60); Japan, Aichi Prefecture
- Education: Hokkaido University dropout
- Occupation: Novelist
- Writing career
- Period: 2006–
- Genres: Novel non-fiction essay criticism
- Subject: Novel
- Notable works: Shatoon/Brown bear Forest (2007); Why Masahiko Kimura Didn't Kill Rikidozan (2011); Memories of Nanatei Judo (2013)
- Notable awards: This mystery is great! Award (2006); Sōichi Ōya Nonfiction Award (2012); Shincho Document Award (2012)

Toshinari Masuda (増田 俊也, born November 8, 1965) is a Japanese novelist, critic, and visiting professor of Nagoya University of Arts.

After winning the Grand Prize for the This mystery is great! Award in 2006, he started expanding his work into other genres such as nonfiction, essays, and criticism. Later, he won the Sōichi Ōya Nonfiction Award for his work, Why Masahiko Kimura Didn't Kill Rikidozan.

== Biography ==
Born in Aichi Prefecture. Graduated from Asahigaoka High School.

Two years after graduating high school, he enrolled in Hokkaido University, and during his stay there, he joined the judo club where experienced the newaza-centered Nanatei Judo, which follows the Kosen Judo style. One of his seniors in the Hokkaido University Judo Club is Masao Kosuge, who was the director of Asahiyama Zoo.... Because he wanted to become a polar bear ecologist, he wanted to join the brown bear research group at Hokkaido University in addition to the judo club, but gave up because he could not balance his work with the judo club.

In this senior year, after his final Nanatei Judo tournament, he retired from the club and dropped out of college. He started working as a newspaper reporter at the Hokkai Times in 1989. In 1992, he started working at Chunichi Shimbun to become a reporter for the Sports Department.

In 2006, after winning the grand prize for the This mystery is great! Award for his work, Shatoon/Brown bear Forest, manga version, Masuda became an author. The inspiration for this piece came from the rage he felt when he was part of an environmental protection movement group back in college, fighting the forced logging of the Shiretoko virgin forests.

In 2012, he won both the 43rd Soichi Oya Nonfiction Award and the 11th Shincho Document Award for his book Why Masahiko Kimura Didn't Kill Rikidozan.

In 2013, he was nominated as a finalist for the 4th Yamada Futaro Award for his work Memories of Nanatei Judo.

In April 2016, Masuda took early retirement from the Chunichi Shimbun, where he had worked for 25 years, and became a full-time writer.

In 2017, he won the second "Books About Hokkaido Award" for his work, "Hokkai Times Story.”

== Writing style ==
He admires García Márquez, Milan Kundera, and has mentioned Shichio Shiono, Yasutaka Tsutsui, Robert B. Parker, Kurt Vonnegut, Truman Capote, Hemingway, and Dostoevsky as his favorite authors.

His debut novel, Shatoon/Brown bear Forest, is an entertaining piece influenced by Steven Spielberg, and it also received attention from creators of other genres such as Hideaki Sorachi and Hitoshi Iwaaki. He was a finalist for the Sogen SF Short Story Prize, and also showed a slapstick writing style in "Attack of the Saturn People", which was featured in NOVA: A Newly Written Japanese SF Collection 7 (published in 2012).

On the other hand, his autobiography novel, Memories of Nanatei Judo, is a novel based on his experience as a member of the Hokkaido University Judo club featuring both real and fictional characters. Masuda started this piece on a memo pad when his fellow judo club member died unexpectedly. There are also other characters in the novel modeled after those who had died. He said the novel was like a "Requiem for those who aren't with us anymore" in an interview.

In his 1600-page nonfiction piece, Why Masahiko Kimura Didn't Kill Rikidozan, he used a distinct writing style where he used himself as one of the main characters of the story. Some criticized Masuda's depiction of Masahiko Kimura, saying it was biased in his favor, but writers such as Baku Yumemakura, Keiichiro Hirano, Hiroyuki Itsuki, Riku Onda, and Yoshiko Sakurai said they enjoyed the book.

Many of his works have been made into manga. Shatoon/Brown bear Forest was published in Business Jump (in three volumes), Why Masahiko Kimura Didn't Kill Rikidozan was published in Weekly Populous under the title KIMURA/manga version (in 13 volumes), and Memories of Nanatei Judo was also published in Big Comic Original (in three volumes).

== Character ==
- Masuda is a fan of Robert B. Parker from the Private Detective Spenser series. When his college professor asked him about his potentials when he decided to drop out, he cited The Judas Goat and replied, "One a scale of one to ten? Ten." And when he was looking for a new apartment, he told his real estate agent to find him a nice room with a "view that reminds me of Boston". Spencer's influence on him was pretty evident and it confused many people around him. He wears a blazer from Brooks Brothers, the same as Spencer's. He even got the same size, 44. He constantly adjusts his bench press routine to make sure the jacket fits him perfectly.
- Being a competitor himself, he also works as a critic of mixed martial arts. Yuki Nakai (former mixed martial artist and current president of the Japan Brazilian Jiu-Jitsu Federation) joined the Hokkaido University Judo Club three years after Masuda. Shiko Yamashita (former Pro Shooto light heavyweight world champion) is also from the same team, joining the team 6 years after Masuda. In his nonfiction book, Yuki Nakai on the Eve of VTJ, he reflects on what Yuki Nakai was like when he joined the Judo Club as a new student, and tells the story leading up to his fight against Rickson Gracie, despite losing his sight in the first match of the tournament Vale Tudo Japan Open 95.
- Yasushi Inoue, in his trilogy of autobiographical novels, Shirobanba and Natsukusa Fuyunami, followed by Kita no Umi, tells the story about the judo summer camp at Kanazawa University he attended while studying for college entrance exams. However, story ends before the main character, Yasushi Inoue, enrolls in college. Memories of Nanatei Judo was written as a sequel to Inoue's trilogy.
- KIMURA, manga version of Why Masahiko Kimura Didn't Kill Rikidozan drawn by Kunichika Harada, became a popular series in Weekly Taisyuu. Its subtitle reads, "Dedicated to the 'constellation of men'", which refers to the work, Constellation of men, which was written by Kajiwara Ikki and drawn by Harada, but was unfinished and abandoned due to Kajiwara's sudden death.
- In an interview with the Hokkaido Shimbun when he won the Sōichi Ōya Nonfiction Prize, he said, "Masao Kosuge, my senior, also performed a miracle at the zoo. I was inspired by him" he said, expressing his respect for Kosuge, a senior member of the Hokkaido University Judo Club.
- Masuda is a fan of Himouto! Umaru-chan.
- His beloved cat's name is Thomas. He named his cat after Tom and Jerry. His favorite car is a Suzuki Jimny, of which he owns two, one is a 1990 model, 26 years old, and the other is a 2007 model, 9 years old, which he bought used (as of 2014).
- Bungo Shirai, chairman of the Chunichi Shimbun, travelled from Nagoya to attended the 2012 Ohtake Award ceremony to congratulate Masuda. When Masashi Yamamoto retired, Chairman Shirai said, "It's a wonderful decision. I hope you will continue to be active in the next stage of your life." Reading this in the papers, Masuda, when he turned 50 and made the same decision to become a full-time writer, he said, "I’ll work hard so chairman Shirai will one day say the same thing to me."
- At the age of 29, he applied to join the Hyogo Prefectural Police to become a police officer. A junior member of the Hokkaido University Judo Club committed suicide due to depression, so he wanted to get back into Judo and show him that he's still got it. He chose the Hyogo Prefectural Police because he couldn't apply to other units due to his age. However, in his final interview, the interviewers had doubts about his decision to quit his job at the newspaper company and start over his career with a bunch of 18-year-olds. Masuda didn't get the job.
- His biological father's cousin is the poet Hitoshi Anzai.

== Works ==
=== Novels ===
- Shatoon/Brown bear Forest (Takarajimasha)
- Memories of Nanatei Judo (Kadokawa Shoten)
- Hokkai Times Story (Shinchosha)

=== Nonfiction ===
- Why Masahiko Kimura Didn't Kill Rikidozan(Shinchosha)
- Masahiko Kimura sidestory (East Press)
- Yuki Nakai on the eve of VTJ (Kadokawa Shoten)

=== Criticism, essays, etc. ===
- 31 Chapters to Improve Your Manhood (PHP Institute)

=== Co-authored ===
- What is true strength (Shinchosha, co-authored with Yuki Nakai)

=== Compilation ===
- Requiem of the Flesh (Shinchosha)

=== Anthology ===
- Attack of the Saturn People (NOVA Written Japanese SF Collection vol.7, March 2012)
- Brand of Love (Kono Mystery ga Sugoi!|This Mystery is great! Grand Prize 10th Anniversary 10 Minute Mystery)

=== Works not collected in book form ===
- The Ghosts of MIT (novel; This mystery is great! Award Grand Prize winner's newly written magazine)
- A Dwarf Digging Holes (Novel; Shōsetsu Shinchō)

=== Books of manga adaptations ===
- Shatoon/Brown bear Forest, Book 1–3 (Shueisha, drawn by Michinori Okutani)
- KIMURA, 13 volumes in one book (Futabasha, art by Kuninobu Harada)
- Memory of Nanatei Judo: manga version vol.1 – Continued from there (Shogakukan, manga art by Ichimaru) – Continuing series

== Related people ==
- Yasushi Inoue
- Masao Kosuge
- Yuki Nakai
