= Shorinji Kempo =

Japanese martial art

Shorinji Kempo 少林寺拳法
- Also known as: • Nippon Shorinji Kempo • Shōrinji Kempō
- Focus: Hybrid
- Hardness: Both hard and soft
- Country of origin: Japan
- Creator: Doshin So
- Famous practitioners: Yuki Kondo, Sonny Chiba, Etsuko Shiomi, Hiroyuki Sanada, Norio Wakamoto, Tak Sakaguchi, Kengo Ohkuchi, Keisuke Itagaki, Masaya Tokuhiro, Yoshisada Yonezuka, Shinobu Ichiyanagi, Kenneth Kimmins, Nao Nagasawa, Koji, Toma Kuroda
- Parenthood: Shaolin kung fu, Hakko-ryu jujutsu, Fusen-ryū jūjutsu
- Descendant arts: Byakuren Kaikan
- Olympic sport: No
- Official website: World Shorinji Kempo Organisation(WSKO); Shorinji Kempo Unity

Shorinji Kempo (少林寺拳法, Shōrin-ji Kenpō; meaning "Shaolin Temple Pugilism") is a Japanese martial art. The name Shōrinji Kempo is the Japanese reading of Shàolínsì Quánfǎ. It was established in 1947 by Doshin So (宗 道臣, Sō Dōshin) [born Michiomi Nakano (中野道臣, Nakano Michiomi)], a Japanese martial artist and former military intelligence agent who lived in China for many years before and during World War II.

== Training methods ==
Shorinji Kempo is a holistic system, whose training methods are divided into three parts:

1. self-defence training
2. mental training
3. health training

The basis are the concepts that "spirit and body are not separable" (心身一如: shinshin-ichinyo) and that it is integral to train both "body and mind as one" (拳禅一如: kenzen ichinyo).

Through employing a well-organised technical course outline, Shorinji Kempo aims to help the practitioner "establish oneself" and to promote "mutual comfort". The philosophy and techniques of Shorinji Kempo are outlined in their master text, (少林寺拳法教範) Shōrinji-Kempō-kyōhan.

== Overview ==
There are two sides of Shorinji Kempo – true budō (武道) and educational system. As the latter, the organisation is well known for their mental training institution as well as body training facilities dōjō (道場).

The founder, Doshin So, wanted to establish not only an organisation which incorporated mental and physical training but also wanted to educate Japanese people who had been completely demoralised by World War II. His aim was to help those who had lost their way and rebuild Japan for the future. It is said that he tried to teach Buddhist philosophy but no one followed him. Later on, So reportedly saw a vision of Bodhidharma, which inspired him to pursue teaching martial arts, as Bodhidharma was believed to have done. Both of these are later to become the main training methods of Shorinji Kempo.

Shorinji Kempo includes a broad curriculum of self-defense techniques, known as hokei (法形). For demonstration or competition purposes, these are combined into a choreographed sequence known as an embu (演武). The embu consists of (typically) 6 sections and each section includes a series of gōhō (剛法) or hard techniques and jūhō (柔法) or soft techniques. During a pair-form or kumi embu, one person attacks and another person defends for one section, and they then swap roles for the next section. The application of technique within an embu is known as hien (飛燕) or flying swallow which represents speed and smoothness of those techniques. The embu is occasionally performed wearing a black robe, called hōi (法衣), for example at an opening or closing ceremony of a taikai (大会, convention/tournament).

=== Hombu ===
Headquartered in Tadotsu town, Kagawa Prefecture (on Shikoku island) in Japan.

Buildings:

- Hondo (main dojo/hall)
- Kodo (lecture hall)
- Rensei-dojo (former 1st dojo)
- Shokudo (dining room)
- Daigan-toh (memorial tower)
- Zenrin Gakuen (college house)

The bones and ashes of Doshin So are buried behind the lecture hall.

=== Organizations ===
The organisation of the Shorinji Kempo group is divided into 5 entities:

- Religious entity (金剛禅総本山少林寺: Kongō-zen Sōhon-zan Shōrinji),
- Foundation entity Shorinji Kempo Foundation Federation (一般財団法人少林寺拳法連盟: Ippan-zaidan-hōjin Shōrinji-kempō Renmei),
- Educational entity Zenrin Gakuen College (学校法人禅林学園: Gakkō-hōjin Zenrin Gakuen),
- Global entity World Shorinji Kempo Organization, WSKO (少林寺拳法世界連合: Shōrinji-kempō Sekai Rengō),
- Intellectual property entity (一般社団法人SHORINJI KEMPO UNITY: Ippan-shadan-hōjin Shōrinji-kempō Yunitī).

The relationship between these five entities is very close because of the unique fusion of religion, martial arts, and education. (Source: web site of Shorinji Kempo Foundation Federation and Shorinji Kempo Kyohan written by Doshin So)

=== National federations ===
- Shorinji Kempo Foundation Federation (Japan)
- Indonesian Shorinji Kempo Federation
- Malaysian Shorinji Kempo Federation
- Swiss Shorinji Kempo Federation
- Finnish Shorinji Kempo Federation
- Swedish Shorinji Kempo Federation
- Italian Shorinji Kempo Federation
- French Shorinji Kempo Federation
- German Shorinji Kempo Federation
- Spanish Shorinji Kempo Federation
- Portuguese Shorinji Kempo Federation
- Russian Shorinji Kempo Federation
- Ukrainian Shorinji Kempo Federation
- United Kingdom Shorinji Kempo Federation
- United States Shorinji Kempo Federation
- Canadian Shorinji Kempo Federation
- Brazilian Shorinji Kempo Federation

=== The Shaolin monastery ===
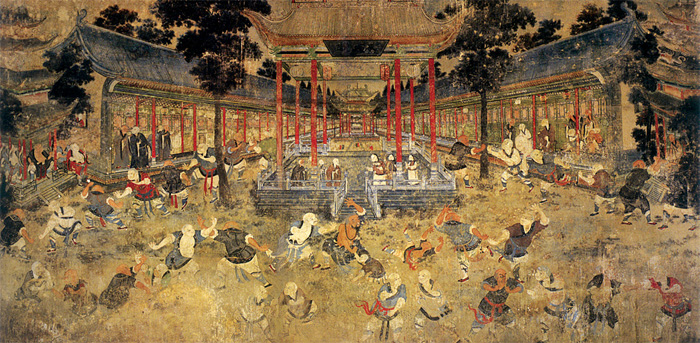
The mural painting in the Shaolin Monastery in which Doshin So took heavy influence from

The name "Shōrinji" is a literal reading of the Chinese "Shaolin Temple" from the Shaolin Monastery in Henan Province, China. Dōshin Sō claimed to have inherited the title of the 21st master of the Giwamon-ken (義和門拳) system (in Mandarin: Yihe Mén Quán) which is believed to have been used during the Boxer rebellion of 1899 to 1901.

Dōshin Sō claimed to have been much impressed to see paintings on the wall of Byakue-den (白衣殿) chapel at Shaolin Temple, although there is no evidence that he ever visited it. The style of the monks practicing the martial arts was supposedly very fresh and vital to him. He believed it was the origin of the existing quan fa in China. (source: a book "Hi-den Shorinji Kempo" 秘伝少林寺拳法「光文社」written by Doshin So, published by Kobun-sha Kappa Books)

=== Emblem ===
The so-en emblem

The swastika, called manji in Japanese, was originally the emblem for Shorinji Kempo, as it is used in Dharmic religions, as well as by many cultures around the world, for centuries. The swastika can either mean love (left-facing) and strength (right-facing) which symbolise Kongo-zen teaching. However, given the social stigma that the swastika carries, the WSKO replaced it with the character 拳 (ken), which means "fist", in the center of tate-manji (swastika guarded by shields) on the emblem or using nagare-manji which meant "rounded swastika".

In 2005, the Shorinji Kempo Group introduced a new symbol for all the international Shorinji Kempo federations. The new mark is called so-en (double circle) and it is said that this is the extreme shape of two swastikas intertwined. The so-en emblem is put on the training uniform (keikogi), belt (obi), and the hōi, a black robe worn by high-ranking practitioners during exhibitions.

== History ==
Doshin Sō, birthname Michiomi Nakano, was born in Okayama Prefecture and spent his youth in northern China, first with his grandfather and then as an intelligence agent of the occupying Imperial Japanese Army to collect military information during the war. As part of his cover, he was posted to a Taoist school as an apprentice. There, Nakano met Chen Liang (陳 良), a Taoist priest and master of Báilián Mén Quán or Báilián Quán (meaning "White Lotus Fist"). After some time, Chen introduced Nakano to Wen Taizong (文 太宗), a master in Yihe Mén Quán or Yihe Quán (meaning "Righteous Harmony Fist"). Wen would take in Nakano as his student at the Shaolin Temple, at Henan, and passed onto him the title of grandmaster in that specific style of quan fa.

In the final days of the Second World War, the Soviet Union broke its neutrality pact with Japan, declaring war. The Soviets invaded Manchuria on 9 August, and overran the Japanese in less than 11 days. The aftermath was appalling; Japanese casualties were tenfold than that of the Soviets'; both civilians and wounded Japanese soldiers were left to die while the army retreated; and many Japanese civilians committed mass suicide. It was in this carnage that Dōshin Sō recognised and understood the "nature of the human being". According to his book, the nature and quality of the person is extremely important since politics, law, and day-to-day living are all conducted by human beings.

After returning to Japan, Sō thought of establishing a cram school for young people. He was stationed in the small town of Tadotsu, on Shikoku island, to teach Buddhist philosophy. He established Shorinji Kempo to take the concept of ken-zen ichinyo by following Bodhidharma and made use of techniques he had learned in China (source: the book "Hi-den Shōrinji Kempō" (秘伝少林寺拳法) written by Dōshin Sō, published by Kobun-sha Kappa Books). This promotion and campaign was known as Kongō-zen undō (Diamond-zen campaign) and expanded Shorinji Kempo throughout Japan by his pupils. This campaign and concept was inherited by his daughter Yūki Sō (宗 由貴, Sō Yūki) after his death in 1980 till present. After his death, Dōshin Sō is called "Kaiso" or founder.

=== Milestones ===
1947 - Religious entity was established
1948 - Nippon Hokuha Shorinji Kempo Society (日本北派少林寺拳法会) was established
1951 - Kongō Zen Sōhonzan Shōrinji (金剛禅総本山少林寺) and Kōmanji kyōdan (黄卍教団) established
1956 - Educational entity, Nihon Shōrinji Bugei Senmon-gakkō (日本少林寺武芸専門学校) was established
1957 - "All Japan Shorinji Kempo Federation" (全日本少林寺拳法連盟, Zen-nihon Shōrinji Kempō Renmei) was established
1963 - "Shorinji Kempo Federation of Japan" (社団法人日本少林寺拳法連盟, Shadan-hōjin Nihon Shōrinji Kempō Renmei) was formed as corporate entity
1972 - "International Shorinji Kempo Federation" (ISKF) (国際少林寺拳法連盟) was established
1974 - "World Shorinji Kempo Organization" (WSKO) was established
1980 - Doshin So's death
1992 - "Shorinji Kempo Federation Foundation" formed as a foundation entity
1997 - 50th anniversary celebration
2000 - Shorinji Kempo Group was organised
2002 - Busen (Shorinji Kempo Budo Academy) High School was opened
2003 - Busen renamed as Zenrin Gakuen College
2003 - New logo of Shorinji Kempo (so-en) was designed
2005 - Official adoption of the 'so-en' emblem
2007 - 60th anniversary celebration
2008 - All Japan Junior High School Shorinji Kempo Federation was formed
2009 - Sekai-taikai (global convention) cancelled in Indonesia because of security concerns, but taikai held
2012 - Doshin So's 100th Birthday Memorial Taikai, held in Yokohama Japan
2013 - Shorinji Kempo World Taikai 2013, held in Osaka Japan
2017 - Shorinji Kempo World Taikai (in California) and 70th anniversary celebration
(source: w:ja:少林寺拳法, in Japanese)

== Philosophy ==
Shorinji Kempo is neither a traditional form of martial art nor a kind of competitive sport. It is said to be as a religious gyō among pupils. According to the Buddhist doctrine, the spirit and fleshly body are inseparable. By practicing Shorinji Kempo techniques and learning its philosophy, it is believed to develop a firm body like a pair of standing Vajradhara (金剛神: Kongō-shin or 金剛力士 Kongō-rikishi) and the never-give-up spirit of Bodhidharma (菩提達磨: Bodai-daruma).

=== Zen ===
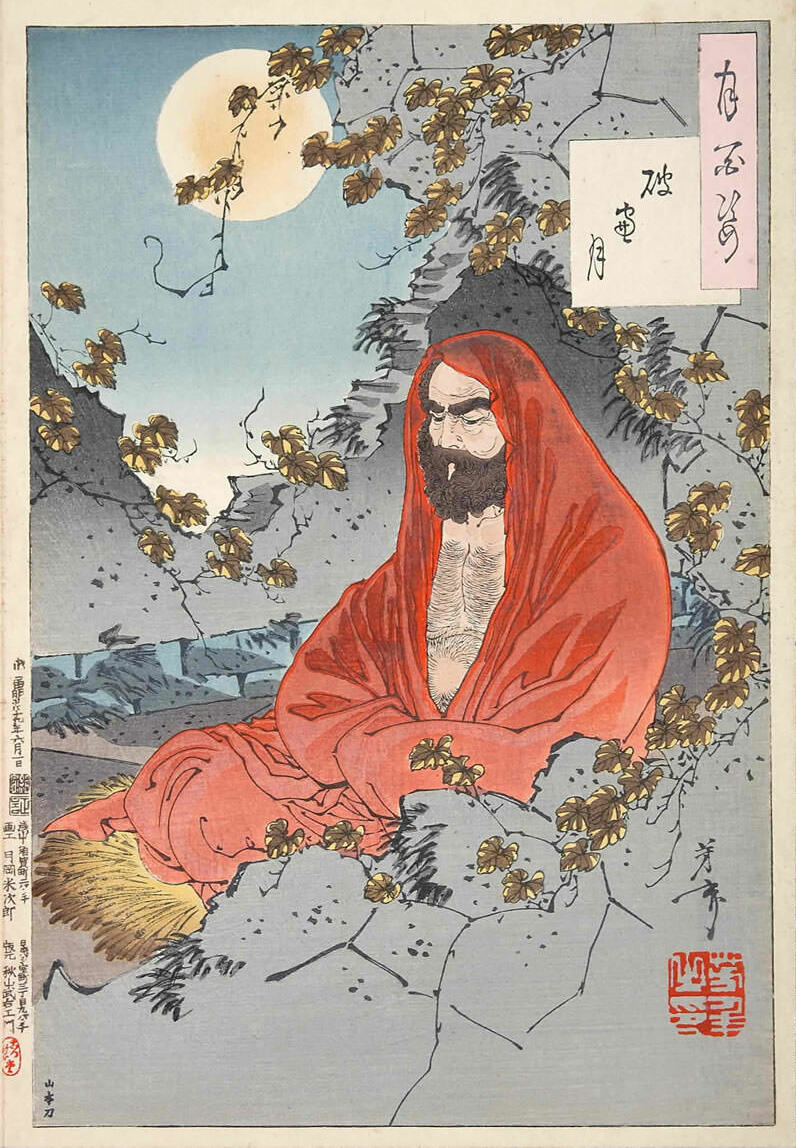
Bodhidharma (Daruma) - Patriarch of Zen

Shorinji Kempo incorporates zen for mental training. Techniques are mainly divided into 3 categories: gōhō (剛法 hard techniques - hand strikes, chops, hammers, elbows, knees, kicks, reaps, stomps, and blocks); jūhō (柔法 soft techniques - throws, pins, chokes, joint manipulations, dodges and releases) and; seihō (整法 healing techniques - acupressure, bone setting, and resuscitation techniques).

Doshin So in his book, "What is Shorinji Kempo?", said that he pursued his revelations and the development of the fighting technique of Bodhidharma known as the Arakan no ken (阿羅漢之拳) or the Arhat fist. He believed this to have originated in India around 5,000 years ago. He was inspired by seeing representations of the wall paintings at the Shaolin Temple in China.

Those who practice Shorinji Kempo are called kenshi (拳士; meaning 'boxers'). Kenshi always salute with gassho (合掌), the greeting commonly used among Buddhist pupils. The gassho-rei(合掌礼) is also gassho-gamae (合掌構) stance, with both palms put together and raised in front of one's face.

== Qualifications ==
There are qualifications for 1st degree black belt (1st "dan") in order to achieve the steps of body and spiritual training: These are bukai, hōkai, and sōkai.

Examples of bukai (武階 martial rank) and corresponding hōkai (法階 philosophical rank):

- 1st dan (初段 sho-dan) - 准拳士 Jun-kenshi
- 2nd dan (弐段 ni-dan) - 少拳士 Sho-kenshi
- 3rd dan (参段 san-dan) - 中拳士 Chu-kenshi
- 4th dan (四段 yon-dan) - 正拳士 Sei-kenshi
- 5th dan (五段 go-dan) - 大拳士 Dai-kenshi

After having 1st, 2nd and 3rd degree bukai qualifications, kenshi practicing at doin will automatically have Jun-kenshi, Sho-kenshi and Chu-kenshi in hokai qualifications, those kenshi practicing at branches will have these corresponding hokai after joining the training at Shorinji Kempo headquarters in Tadotsu town in Kagawa prefecture in Japan.

From 1st to 3rd degree, the examinations are held in each prefectural Shorinji Kempo organization headquarters. However, the special examination is only held at its main headquarters in Tadotsu for the qualifications of 4th degree and above. Outside Japan 3rd degree practitioners (san-dan) are considered teachers. In Japan, 4th degree practitioners (yon-dan) and above are considered teachers, but those ranking at the 5th degree (go-dan) and above are officially called sensei (先生: teacher). Kenshi who obtained 4th dan automatically obtain Sei-kenshi as well.

WSKO's qualifications and conditions are a little different from its Japanese domestic counterparts.

Arm emblem "category" colors:

- Red: for doin kenshi
- Blue: for shibu kenshi
- Green: for Zenrin Gakuen College kenshi
- Purple: for WSKO kenshi

Arm emblem "title" colors:

- Gold: for master of doin or shibu
- Silver: for master of doin or shibu with 4th dan and below
- Red: assistant master with 3rd dan or above

Also, there is a sokai (priesthood rank) qualification in Kongo Zen Sohon-zan Shorinji. 2nd dan or Sho-kenshi will study Kongo zen's philosophy and submit an application form and thesis.

== Training system ==
Spiritual training

kiryoku (気力)
kisei (気勢)
kiai (気合)

Mental training

inyō (陰陽)
kyojitsu (虚実)
tempō (天方)
chii (地位)
chijutsu (知術)
chiryaku (知略)

Physical training

• Gō-hō (剛法) (”hard methods”: 8 techniques, 3 traditions)

8 Gō-hō techniques:
tsuki-waza (突技)
uchi-waza (打技)
kiri-waza (切技)
keri-waza (蹴技)
kari-waza (刈技)
fumi-waza (踏技)
taigi (体技)
bōgi (防技)

3 Gō-hō traditional weapons:
dokko-den (独鈷伝)
nyoi-den (如意伝)
kongō-den (金剛伝)

• Jū-hō (柔法 ”soft methods”: 10 techniques)

gyaku-waza (逆技)
nage-waza (投技)
katame-waza (固技)
shime-waza (締技)
hogi (捕技)
ōatsugi (押圧技)
nukite-hō (抜手法)
nukimi-hō (抜身法)
shu-hō (守法)
baku-hō (縛法)

• Sei-hō (整法 "healing methods")

seikei (整経)
seimyaku (整脉)
seikotsu (整骨)
kappō (活法)

• Taigamae (体構え "stance")

Byakuren hachi-jin (白蓮八陣 "8 stances of Byakuren")

gasshō-gamae (合掌構え)
manji-gamae (まんじ構え)
midare-gamae (乱れ構え)
hassō-gamae (八相構え)
taiki-gamae (待気構え)
gyaku taiki-gamae (逆待気構え)
aiki-gamae (合気構え)
byakuren chudan-gamae (白蓮中段構え) (or commonly called kaisoku chudan-gamae 開足中段構え)

Giwa kyū-jin (義和九陣 "9 stances of Giwa")

kesshu-gamae (結手構え)
ichiji-gamae (一字構え)
niō-gamae (仁王構え)
chūdan-gamae (中段構え)
gedan-gamae (下段構え)
gyaku gedan-gamae (逆下段構え)
fukko-gamae (伏虎構え)
tate musō-gamae (立無相構え)
yoko musō-gamae (横無相構え)

• Fujin-hō (布陣法 "body positions")

seitai-gamae (正対構え) (both kenshi facing in byakuren chudan-gamae)
tai-gamae (対構え) (when one kenshi has a left-front stance, the other also takes a left-front stance)
hiraki-gamae (開構え) (when one kenshi has a left-front stance, the other takes a right-front stance)

• Umpo-hō (運歩法 "footwork")

fumikomi-ashi (踏込足)
maeyose-ashi (前寄足)
kumo-ashi (蜘蛛足)
kani-ashi (蟹足)
chidori-ashi (千鳥足)
sashikomi-ashi (差込足)
sashikae-ashi (差替足)
tobikomi-ashi (跳込足)

• Tai-sabaki (体捌き "body movement")

furi-mi (振身)
sori-mi (反り身)
hiki-mi (引身)
ryūsui (流水)
han-tenshin (半転身)
gyaku-tenshin (逆転身)
han-tenkan (半転換)
zen-tenkan (全転換)

• Ukemi (受身 "breakfalls")

mae-ukemi (前受身)
ushiro-ukemi (後受身)
ōten yori okiagari (横転より起き上がり) (also in the Kyohan as tombo-gaeri とんぼ返り)
dai-sharin (大車輪)

== Embu ==
Embu is a combination of hokei (organised patterns of goho and juho techniques) which has 6 sections. It is similar to "kata", except that two or more people participate. Embu is performed in the court, in the gym, at a Taikai or other ceremonial occasions. In these patterns one kenshi takes the part of attacker (kōsha 攻者) and one acts as defender (shusha 守者); they then change roles and repeat the technique. After the set form technique the kenshi perform ren-han-ko (連反攻: a series of offence after defence) which is a free form counter-attack which continues until the original attacker successfully blocks/parries and counters. The juho techniques are followed by katame (pinning techniques) or kime (finishing techniques with various hand strikes or kicks to nerve points).

Embu start with gassho-rei and are performed usually in kumi embu (pair), tandoku embu (single) and dantai embu (6 or 8 in a group).

Initially, there was no regulation in performing embu. Nowadays, it is rated out of 5 (sometimes 3 at preliminary selection) judges having 60 points each for the 6 sections and 40 points each for other factors for comprehensiveness. The maximum possible total of 300 points can be achieved after eliminating the highest and the lowest scores when 5 judges are judging. Kumi-embu and dantai-embu are performed within a time limit of between one and a half to two minutes.

The most famous embu pair was Masuomi Nakano and Toshio Misaki whose embu was said to have impressed Doshin So.

== Unyo-ho ==
Earlier in Shorinji Kempo's history, was the Unyo-ho, a fighting competition. After many accidents during sparring bouts with no headgear, the organization required the wearing of headgear, body protectors, and groin guards. A system of limiting each kenshi to one role of defender or attacker was also introduced for safety. Rating is done by judging attacking points, defensive techniques and counter-attacks.

== Current status ==
Currently, Kouma So, son of Yuuki So and grandson of Kaiso So Doshin, the founder of Shorinji Kempo, is the president of the World Shorinji Kempo Organization (WSKO). He took over from his mother in 2020 at which point she had retired from office after 40 years of service. Kazuhiro Kawashima is the national president of the Japanese Shorinji Kempo Federation.

In 2010, the British Shorinji Kempo Federation (BSKF) split from the WSKO, in response to the latter's announcement on March 3 that it was dissolving the former. However, the United Kingdom Shorinji Kempo Federation (UKSKF) still remains affiliated with WSKO.

The BSKF applied to the British Intellectual Property Office (IPO) to register the trademark that it has used for 25 years. Shorinji Kempo Unity opposed the application, but the IPO found that SKU had not demonstrated genuine use of its registered trademark. SKU appealed the decision. In the High Court, the appeal judge found that SKU had shown genuine use of its mark, but that the BSKF mark can be registered. Judge Warren found that Shorinji Kempo is a generic term, which simply describes a martial art, and even if this were not the case, there is no possibility of confusion of the BSKF's mark with that of the SKU.

In 2015, the International Kempo Association (IKA) was formed (and incorporated in the UK), as an umbrella organisation and loose collective for several ex-WSKO groups. It currently includes 8 member organisations from Czech Republic, Hong Kong, Ireland, Italy, Japan, Spain, Switzerland, and UK (BSKF).

== See also ==
- Hard and Soft (martial arts)
- Shuhari
- Origins of Asian martial arts
- Bodhidharma

== Bibliography ==
- Shorinji Kempo philosophy and techniques by Doshin So, Published by Japan Publications, Inc. Tokyo Japan.
- Kenkyusha's New Japanese-English Dictionary, Kenkyusha Limited, Tokyo 1991, ISBN 4-7674-2015-6
