= Taro Miyake =

Japanese professional wrestler

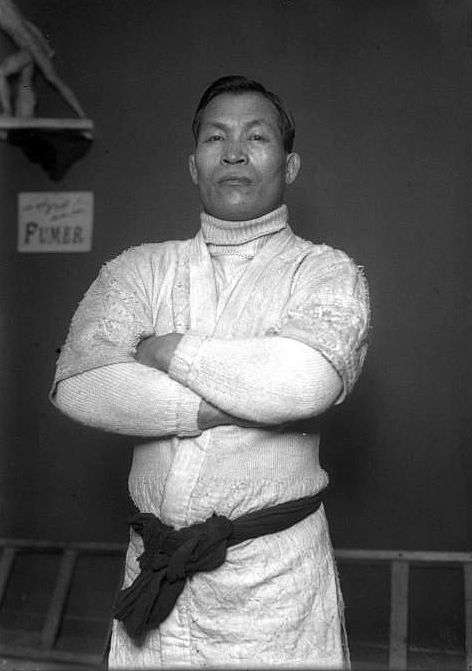
- Miyake visiting Maitrot’s Academy in Paris, 1914

Personal information
- Born: August 15, 1881 Okayama, Japan
- Died: 1935 (aged 53–54)

Professional wrestling career
- Billed height: 5 ft 8 in (1.73 m)
- Billed weight: 165 lb (75 kg)
- Billed from: Japan
- Trained by: Mataemon Tanabe Uyemura; Yataro Handa
- Debut: 1898

Taro Miyake (Miyake Taruji) (c. 1881–1935) was a professional Japanese jujutsu fighter, instructor, catch wrestler and author. Protege of the legendary ground-fighter Mataemon “Newaza” Tanabe, he is credited with helping establish jujutsu and MMA in the United Kingdom, France and the United States at the start of the 20th century.

== Biography ==
Miyake started his training under the famous Fusen-ryu jujutsu master Mataemon Tanabe, as well as Osaka master Yataro Handa, head of the 2000+ member Seibukan which had a very close connection to Tanabe’s ground fighting newaza. In 1899 Miyake started working as a teacher in Nara, and two years later he was appointed police instructor in Kobe. However, in 1904 he was fired for taking part in a brawl, so Miyake departed Japan for London. upon recruitment by fellow Seibukan student Sadakazu Uyenishi.

Miyake toured through spectacles and music halls, defeating many of the best wrestlers of the time and engaging in open all-comers challenge matches. He also famously defeated the reigning champion in the jujutsu style, Yukio Tani. Miyake and Tani had joined forces, opening a jujutsu school on Oxford street and co-authoring a book with Tani titled "The Game of Ju-Jitsu". He was widely considered the best exponent of Jiu-Jitsu in Europe at the time and participated in MMA style matches against boxers in France where laws allowed such bouts to take place. He also toured the UK with Mitsuyo Maeda - who had just begun taking an interest in newaza upon his arrival in London in order to compete with catch wrestlers (Maeda would later bring this art to Brazil). In London, he sat for the well-known English artist and lithographer Albert de Belleroche.

In 1914, he reached United States and stayed there for 20 years, settling down in Seattle, where he set his school. On October 20, 1917, Miyake had a famous challenge match against professional wrestler and catch wrestling practitioner Ad Santel who himself studied some judo. Miyake was used to winning. This time, while Miyake fought bravely, he lost the match after receiving a half Nelson slam that was so powerful that Miyake remained dizzy for half an hour after the bout.

Now even more interested in professional wrestling than he was while in Europe, Miyake started working at Ed "The Strangler" Lewis's wrestling promotion, learning the art and having matches against names like Toots Mondt, Clarence Eklund and some others. During the early 20s, Miyake lived in Spokane Washington. In 1928 Miyake returned to Japan and toured there with three other wrestlers, but professional wrestling was not popular in Japan back then and the shows did not sell tickets. He returned to United States along with Danzan-ryu trainee Oki Shikina, who became his apprentice. In 1925 Miyake moved to Chicago and while not on tour, would teach alongside Kodokan Judoka Shozo Kuwashima at 22 E Huron street. In 1931 Miyake moved to New York. As of 1932, in his 50s, he was still competing in bouts at Madison Square Garden. He died in 1935.

== Career highlights ==
- Lost to Ad Santel in Seattle, WA on October 20, 1917 (KO from Half nelson slam)
- Won over John Berg in Spokane, WA on March 15, 1918
- Lost to Canadian Jack Taylor in Vancouver, BC on January 23, 1919
- Lost to Jim Londos on April 8, 1920
- Lost to Canadian Jack Taylor in Casper, WY in April 1921
- Lost to Ed "Strangler" Lewis" in Chicago, IL on December 31, 1923
- Won over Fred Bilger in St. Louis MO on February 19, 1924
- Lost to Oresti Vadalfi in St. Louis MO December 4, 1924
- Won over Bull Montana in Columbus, OH on March 2, 1927
- Won over Ray Carpenter in Columbus, OH on March 9, 1927
- Won over Jack Kogut in Columbus, OH on March 16, 1927
- Lost to Ray Carpenter in Columbus, OH on March 23, 1927
- Lost to Jim Londos in Brooklyn, NY on March 11, 1931
- Lost to Jim Londos in Louisville, KY on May 16, 1931
- Lost to ”Tiger” Nelson in Washington DC May 28, 1931
