= Shuichi Nagaoka =

Japanese judoka

Personal information
- Native name: 永岡 秀一
- Nationality: Japan
- Born: September 17, 1876 Okayama Prefecture, Japan
- Died: November 22, 1952 (aged 76)
- Occupation: Judoka

Sport
- Sport: Judo
- Rank: 10th dan black belt
- Coached by: Kanō Jigorō

Shuichi Nagaoka (永岡 秀一, Nagaoka Shūichi; September 17, 1876 – November 22, 1952) was an early student of Kodokan judo and the third person to be promoted to 10th dan.

== Biography ==
Nagaoka was born in Okayama Prefecture September 17, 1876. He trained in Kito-ryu jujutsu under Noda Kensaburo (野田 権三郎) in Okayama before moving to Tokyo in 1892. In January 1893 he started training at the Kodokan, earning his first dan in September 1894. He was considered a "child prodigy" due to his fast rising, being compared to the legendary Shiro Saigo. His favourite techniques were sutemi-waza.

In 1899, Nagaoka faced Fusen-ryu jujutsu master Mataemon Tanabe in a special match. Tanabe was famous for submitting judokas thanks to his skill at ne-waza, but Nagaoka was able to resist his groundwork. At one point, Mataemon attempted and almost locked a juji-gatame, but Nagaoka's defense and their position near the bounds of the tatami impeded the technique. The match was declared a draw.

In 1902 as a fifth dan, Nagaoka moved to Kobe with the mission of the spreading judo in and taught at the "Hyogo constable Driving School". He was made professor of judo at Dai Nihon Butokukai in 1903. In May 1913 Nagaoka became a mentor at the Kodokan and was made judo head instructor at Tokyo Vocational High School as well as at the Metropolitan Police and Chuo University and was awarded the title of hanshi in judo from the Dainippon Butokukai in 1914. He was promoted to tenth dan on 27 December 1937, the third person to be afforded the honour, and the last person to be promoted to that rank by Kano Shihan. He died November 22, 1952, aged 77.
