= Fusen-ryū =

Japanese martial arts koryū

Fusen-ryū 不遷流
- Ko-ryū

Foundation
- Founder: Motsugai Takeda
- Date founded: Unknown; early 1800s
- Period founded: Bakumatsu (1853–1869)

Current information
- Current headmaster: Kazutoshi Inoue

Arts taught
- Art: Description
- Jujutsu: Unarmed or with minor weapons
- Bōjutsu: Staff art
- Jōjutsu: Short staff art
- Kenjutsu: Sword art
- Iaijutsu: Sword drawing art
- Naginatajutsu: Glaive art
- Kusarigamajutsu: Scythe and chain art
- Nagikamajutsu: Scythe art
- Jittejutsu: Jitte art

Ancestor schools
- Namba Ippo-ryū, Yoshin-ryū, Takenouchi-ryū, Sekiguchi-ryū, Shibukawa-ryū, Kito-ryū, Yagyū Shinkage-ryū, Hōzōin-ryū, Otsubo-ryū, Yamada-ryū

Descendant schools
- Shorinji Kempo; Tohkon Ryu Ju-Jitsu; Juko Ryu Jiu-Jitsu

Fusen-ryū (不遷流, Fusen-ryū) is a traditional school of jujutsu founded by Motsugai Takeda. It contains an extensive system of martial arts, including unarmed fighting (jujutsu), staff (bōjutsu), short staff (jojutsu), sword (kenjutsu), sword drawing (iaijutsu), glaive (naginatajutsu), scythe (nagikamajutsu), scythe and chain (kusarigamajutsu), and jitte (jittejutsu).

While young compared to other koryu jujutsu, Fusen-ryū is well known in martial arts circles due to one of its masters, Mataemon Tanabe, and its rivalry with the Kodokan school. Posterior Fusen-ryū practitioners would be Tanabe's students Taro Miyake and Yukio Tani. Also, according to popular belief, Doshin So, the founder of Shorinji Kempo, was trained in Fusen-ryū jujutsu.

Although its jujutsu style is popularly believed to be highly specialized in newaza or groundfighting, as Tanabe himself was masterfully skilled at it, it actually focused rather on gyaku-waza or stand-up grappling, specially wrist locks. Tanabe described his ground strategy as created from his personal experience in jujutsu contests. The Fusen-ryū school featured a complete curriculum of atemi-waza (striking techniques), nage-waza (throwing techniques), and shime-waza (choking techniques).

== History ==
The founder of Fusen-ryū was Motsugai Takeda, also known by the name of Fusen. He was a part of the Takeda family, and after becoming a monk started training Namba Ippo-ryū jujutsu with Takahasi Inobei Mitsumasa. After receiving his menkyo kaiden, he travelled around many parts of Japan in a form of musha shugyo, learning in the schools of Yoshin-ryū, Takenouchi-ryū, Sekiguchi-ryū, Kito-ryū and Shibukawa-ryū, as well as the armed styles of Yagyū Shinkage-ryū, Hōzōin-ryū, Otsubo-ryū and Yamada-ryū. By adopting the strong points of each style, he created his Fusen-ryū curriculum. After being appointed priest of the Saihoji temple in Kyoto in 1830, he built a dojo in the nearby grounds and started teaching his style. Many martial artists heard his reputation and came to challenge him, but nobody could beat him. It was said Motsugai's students reached the number of 3000. Motsugai died in 1867, after which his school moved its influence field to Okayama.

The school rose to fame again in 1891, when its headmaster Mataemon Tanabe defeated the Kodokan judoka Takisaburo Tobari in a challenge match. At the time, most jujutsu schools in Tokyo were losing place to the growing Kodokan, and the victory was shocking not only for coming from one of them, but also for how easily it happened thanks to Tanabe's personal advantage at newaza. The victory was followed by many others, and Tanabe capitalized on them to promote himself and his style by claiming his wins demonstrated the superiority of Fusen-ryū over judo and not any skill on his part. He taught his art at the Dai Nippon Butoku Kai and at Yataro Handa's Daito-ryū dojo, which went to specialize in newaza, and also shared his knowledge with judokas Yuji Hirooka and Soji Kimotsuki. Despite this, the Fusen-ryū school itself never grew to significant levels (although its lineage survives in Bob, Clarke's WJJF Jiu Jitsu syllabus), with Tanabe remaining as its only renowned exponent. Eventually his son Teruo and his most known apprentices, Taro Miyake and Yukio Tani, became members of the Kodokan. A number of practitioners of Fusen Ryu, including Yukio Tani left Fusen Ryu to become practitioners of Judo. As Jigoro Kano merged techniques from Fusen Ryu, their ability to win against Judoka was neutralized. This was seen with Hajime Isogai forcing a draw against Mataemon Tanabe.
