= Sōichi Ōya =

Japanese journalist

- 大宅 壮一
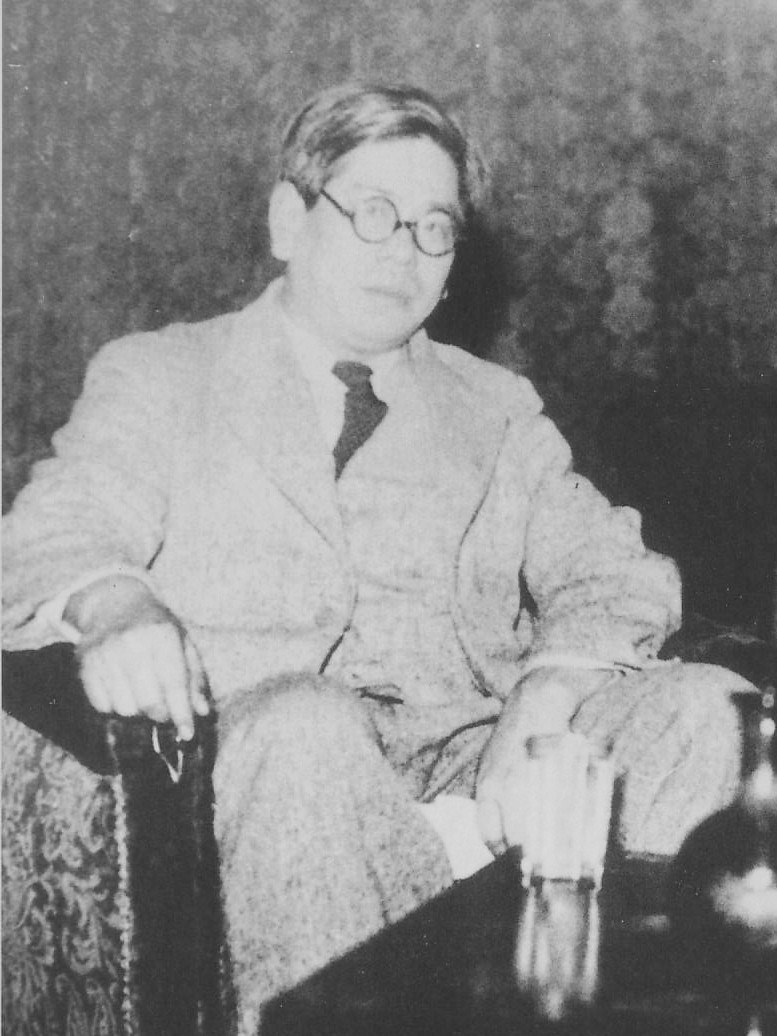
- Sōichi Ōya in 1942
- Born: 13 September 1900; Takatsuki, Osaka, Japan
- Died: 22 November 1970 (aged 70)
- Education: University of Tokyo
- Occupation: Journalist
- Writing career
- Language: Japanese

Sōichi Ōya (大宅 壮一, Ōya Sōichi; 13 September 1900 – 22 November 1970) was a Japanese journalist noted for his research and commentaries on popular culture.

== Biography ==
Born in what is now part of Takatsuki, Osaka, Japan where his father was a soy sauce brewer, Ōya showed an early interest in social issues, and after dropping out of the University of Tokyo, he became involved in the Japan Fabian Society (a gradualist Socialist group). He was also active as a literary essayist and founded the Mass Communication Juku (マスコミ塾, literally the "Mass Communication Workshop"). His legacy includes the Oya Soichi Nonfiction Award, which recognizes the contributions of young journalists, and the Ōya Sōichi Library, a library that is the major archive in Japan collecting popular publications that most institutions ignore. Most of his literary works are included in the Ōya Sōichi Zenshū (大宅壮一全集) published by Sōyōsha (蒼洋社). He was praised "as an iconoclast and hailed for the 'heckling spirit' he had cultivated throughout his career," but he has also been criticized for his critical attitude towards new religions.

During the Japanese occupation of the Dutch East Indies, Ōya lived in Batavia where he was sent to engage in propaganda activities. There he managed two brothels: the “White Horse Riding Club” staffed by Dutch and Eurasian women and the “Black Horse Riding Club” staffed by Indonesian women.
