= Hajime Isogai =

Japanese judoka (1871–1947)

Personal information
- Native name: 磯貝 一
- Nationality: Japan
- Born: October 26, 1871 Miyazaki Prefecture, Japan
- Died: April 19, 1947 (aged 75)
- Occupation: Judoka

Sport
- Sport: Judo
- Rank: 10th dan black belt
- Coached by: Kanō Jigorō; Yokoyama Sakujiro

Hajime Isogai (磯貝 一, Isogai Hajime; October 26, 1871 – April 19, 1947) was an early student of judo and the second person to be promoted to 10th dan. He was considered to be a newaza expert, although was also famed by his tachiwaza as well. He was an early promoter of the kosen judo circuit.

== Biography ==
Isogai was born in Nobeoka, Miyazaki Prefecture, Japan, on October 26, 1871. He was the eldest son of Tsunehisa Isogai (磯貝 恒久, Isogai Tsunehisa), hanshi of Sekiguchi-ryū jūjutsu in Nobeoka. In 1891, he moved to Tokyo and joined the Kodokan where he studied judo under Yokoyama Sakujiro. In 1893, he became judo teacher at third high school in Kyoto, as well as the Dai Nippon Butoku Kai, where he competed against several local jujutsu masters. One of his best known victories was against Takenouchi-ryu master Kotaro Imai in 1897 via hane makikomi. In 1899, he was appointed professor of judo at Butoku Kai. He is often attributed the creation of the hane goshi throw, although the move can be actually traced back to Yamashita Yoshitsugu.

He was famous for his rivalry with Fusen-ryū master Mataemon Tanabe, who was known for defeating multiple judokas in challenge matches thanks to his ne-waza mastery. They fought twice in Kyoto and Fukuoka in 1899, ending in a draw in both bouts. The second fight was specially notable, as Isogai, knowing the field of strength of his adversary, kept the fight standing and threatened him several times with his skill at hane goshi. Still, Isogai was left convinced of the importance of working on ne-waza in order to be a complete fighter.

Isogai and Tanabe fought a third and last time in May 1900, as Mataemon challenged him to meet him on a match in an exhibition in Okayama. It would be an uneven fight for Hajime, as Okayama was headquarters for several jujutsu schools opposed to the Kodokan, and the referee of the fight would be Isogai's old enemy Kotaro Imai himself. However, this time Isogai had perfected his ne-waza with Kaichiro Samura, a judoka expert in groundfighting who had come from Takeuchi Santo-ryū and worked as Hajime's assistant trainer at the Butoku Kai. When Isogai and Tanabe met on the tatami, both descended to the ground and began a grappling contest. Though initially even, the match started to be gradually controlled by Isogai, who neutralized all of Tanabe's movements and impeded him to try submissions or reversals. Attempting to force a restart to rethink his strategy, Tanabe dragged them both towards the bounds of the tatami, but Hajime saw his intention and dragged them back again while Tanabe's followers cried for a stoppage. At the end, Imai declared the fight a draw.

Isogai was promoted to tenth dan, the highest rank in judo, on December 22, 1937. He was the second person to be awarded this grade and the first living person to be presented with it.
