= Motsugai Takeda =

Motsugai Takeda (武田 物外, Takeda Motsugai; 1795–1867), commonly known by his name alone, was a Japanese Zen priest and martial artist from the Edo period. He is known for being the founder of the Fusen-ryū school of jujutsu.

== Biography ==
A member of the Takeda clan, Motsugai was rumored to be a descendant of Shingen Takeda. At 16, after being disowned due to a fight, he became an Sōtō Zen monk and traveled around Japan as a takuhatsu. He was ordained as a priest at Saihoji Temple in Kyoto. Takeda was skilled in calligraphy, painting, haikai poetry, tea ceremony and antiques restoration, but was more famous for his martial skills and his immense strength. Motsugai was trained in eighteen styles of martial arts, both armed and unarmed, and his feats of strength included moving heavy rocks, uprooting trees, winning tug of war competitions against masses of people and breaking wooden boards with his bare fists. The last skill, which granted him the nickname of "Genkotsu Osho" (拳骨和尚, Genkotsu osho; "Fist Monk"), was so famous that his friends and clients asked him to leave the mark of his knuckles on the pillars of their houses and their go boards as a proof of their friendship with him.

Motsugai was called to Kyoto as a mediator during the Meiji Restoration, and there he had a famous confrontation with the Shinsengumi. Once while he was walking around the city, Motsugai spotted an open training hall where the Shinsengumi were sparring with their shinai swords and stopped to observe them. The policemen were offended by this, and they brought Motsugai inside to beat him as a punishment for his indiscretion. However, the monk was tougher than expected and defeated them one after another with just his one-handed nyoi scepter. When Isami Kondo saw this, he took a yari spear and challenged Motsugai to pick a real weapon as well and fight him. Motsugai accepted the duel, but he stated a monk shouldn't use weapons and instead wielded two wooden begging bowls. When an infuriated Kondo attacked, Motsugai trapped his spear between the bowls and, releasing him with a loud kiai, threw him to the floor over his backside. Amazed, Kondo got up and asked his identity, and only then Motsugai revealed his name.

According to sources, Motsugai's most renowned opponent wasn't a man, but a woman, the onna-musha Shuei of the Matsudaira clan, which the Fusen-ryū would serve in the future. Shuei challenged him to a sojutsu competition, and they fought for a day and a night before it was declared a draw.
