= Nami juji jime =

Judo technique

Nami Jūji-jime
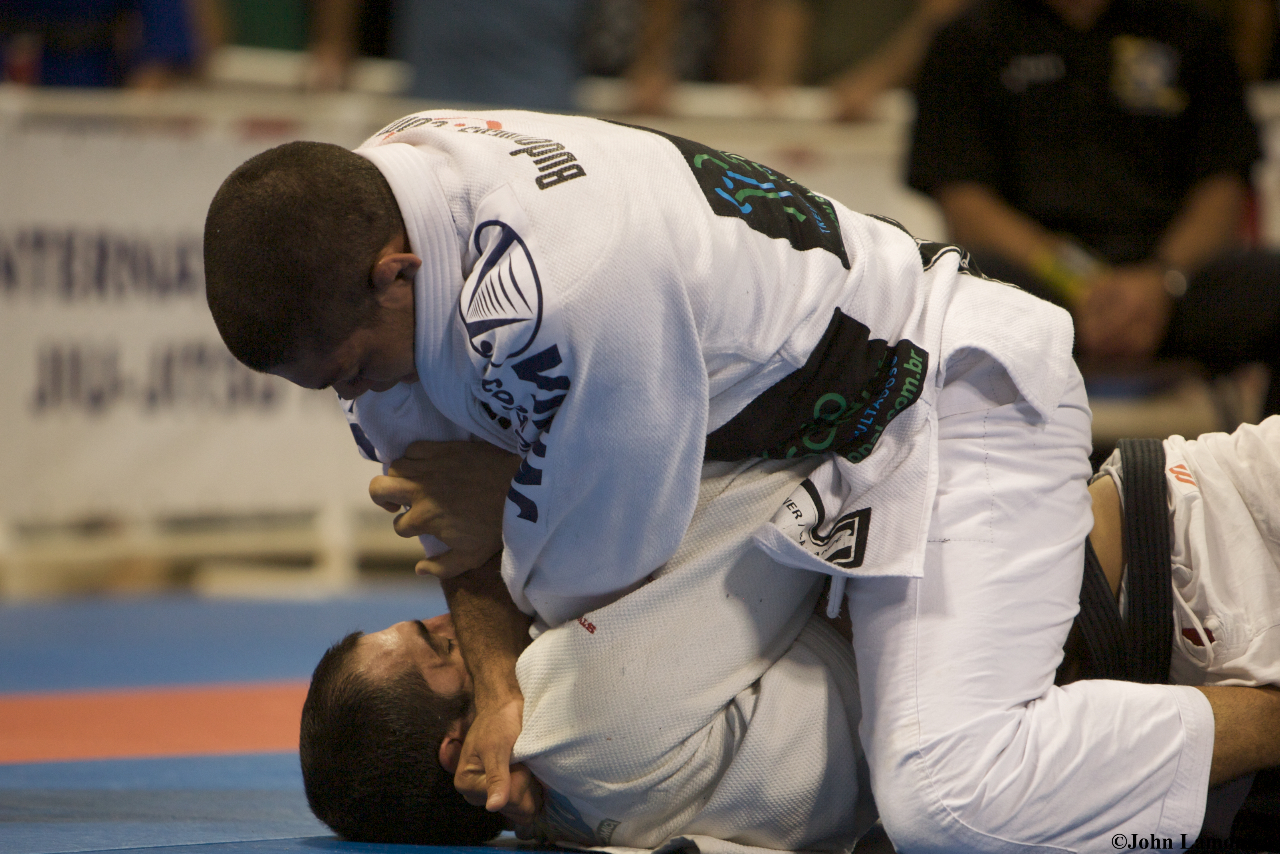
- André Galvão attempting a cross choke at the 2008 World Jiu-Jitsu Championships
- Classification: Katame-waza
- Sub classification: Shime-waza
- Targets: Carotid arteries
- Kodokan: Yes

Technique name
- Rōmaji: Nami Jūji-jime
- Japanese: 並十字絞
- English: Normal cross strangle

Nami Jūji-jime (並十字絞) is one of the twelve constriction techniques of Kodokan Judo in the Shime-waza list. Also known as Namijujijime, Danzan Ryu includes this technique in the Shimete list under the name Gyakujujijime.

The technique is called 'normal' because the backs of both hands of the person applying the choke are facing the person who is applying the choke. The fingers are on top grabbing from the outside of the clothing. The thumbs grab inside underneath the gi or clothing. The hands are high up each side of the neck. Scissoring the hands applies pressure to the carotid arteries reducing blood flow, rapidly resulting in loss of consciousness. In judo, this technique is always taught under supervision and is similarly closely observed by referees in competition.

== Technique description ==
Nami juji jime translated to “Normal Cross Choke”, which is a common Ne-Waza technique that had been adopted both for Judo and Brazilian Jiu-Jitsu. It’s considered one of the most fundamental techniques for both disciplines. The mechanic of the choke, is through establishing a dominant collar grip to opposite side (if you’re right handed you grip to the left, vice versa). The “cross” mechanic allows the dominant hand of the player to maximize friction, provide better leverage and ultimately, neutralize the opposition ability to escape. Furthermore, the opposite hand of the choke provides strong pressure to the neck, alongside the friction of the gi. Which result in a collar choke that constrict the blood flow to opposition’s brain. If apply for too long, the choke could become dangerous to the receiver.

== Included systems ==
Systems:

- Kodokan Judo, Judo Lists
- Danzan Ryu, Danzan Ryu Lists

Lists:

- The Canon Of Judo
- Judo technique

== Similar techniques, variants, and aliases ==
English aliases:

- Normal cross constriction
- Normal cross choke
- Normal cross strangle
- Normal cross lock

Similar:

- Gyaku-Juji-Jime
- Kata-Juji-Jime
