= Osoto makikomi =

Judo technique

- Classification: Nage-waza
- Sub classification: Sutemi-waza
- Kodokan: Yes

Technique name
- Rōmaji: Osoto makikomi
- Japanese: 大外巻込
- English: Big outer wraparound

Osoto Makikomi (大外巻込) is one of the techniques adopted later by the Kodokan into their Shinmeisho No Waza (newly accepted techniques) list. It is categorized as a side sacrifice technique, Yoko-sutemi.

== Technique Description ==
www.judoinfo.com

Exemplar videos:

Tournament from www.judoinfo.com

== Similar Techniques, Variants, and Aliases ==
Soto Makikomi, Hane Makikomi

== Included Systems ==
- Judo
