= Kaichiro Samura =

Japanese judoka (1880–1964)

Personal information
- Native name: 佐村 嘉一郎 Samura Kaichirō
- Born: 1880 Japan
- Died: 1964 (aged 83–84)
- Occupation: Judoka

Sport
- Sport: Judo
- Rank: 10th dan black belt

Kaichiro Samura (佐村 嘉一郎, Samura Kaichirō) (1880–1964) was a Japanese judoka. He was one of the longest living 10th dan (belt degree) judo practitioners in the world.

Son of master Masaaki Samura from Takeuchi Santo-ryū jujutsu, he joined the Kodokan in 1898 and was awarded his 10th dan in April 1948. In 1899 he became head of the judo section at Dai Nippon Butoku Kai, and in 1931 he began teaching at the Kodokan in Tokyo.

He traveled extensively and taught judo at various schools and police academies.
