= Doshin So =

Japanese karateka (1911–1980)

- 宗道臣
- Born: Michiomi Nakano; 10 February 1911; Mimasaka, Okayama, Japan
- Died: 12 May 1980 (aged 69); Tadotsu, Kagawa, Japan
- Other names: Sō Dōshin
- Known for: Shorinji Kempo

Doshin So (宗道臣, Sō Dōshin) (born Michiomi Nakano (中野道臣, Nakano Michiomi)), (1911–1980) was a Japanese soldier and martial artist. He is most known as the creator and founder of Shorinji Kempo and the doctrine Kongo Zen (金剛禅, Kongō Zen). Practitioners of Shorinji Kempo refer to him as Kaiso, Japanese for "the founder".

== Early life ==
Nakano Michiomi was born on 11 February 1911, in the Okayama Prefecture. He was the eldest in 3 siblings; his father a customs officer and his mother, a seamstress. Michiomi was 8 when his father died from alcoholism at 30. Thereafter, his sisters were sent to live with their mother's family while he was sent to Manchuria – then a puppet state of Japan – to live with his paternal grandfather, an employee of a Japanese railroad company and a member of the right-wing Black Dragon Society (黒龍会 Kokuryūkai). His grandfather was also an expert in kendo, sōjutsu, and most likely Fusen-ryū jūjutsu; he often taught young Michiomi whenever he had the time.

Upon hearing news of his mother's death, Michiomi returned to Japan in 1926. His sisters and grandfather would die shortly thereafter. He was then taken under the patronage of his grandfather's friend Mitsuru Tōyama, who was also founder of the Black Ocean Society (玄洋社 Gen'yōsha), the forerunner of the Black Dragon Society.

== Military career and quan fa training in China ==
In 1928, Nakano Michiomi returned to Manchuria, having enlisted in the army and having joined the Black Dragon Society. To facilitate his covert reconnaissance activities, he was posted in a Taoist school headed by Chen Lian, a priest who was also the master of Báilián Quán (白蓮門拳 Byakurenmon-ken). This was Nakano's first experience with Chinese quan fa; he learned Báilián Quán under Chen while carrying out his assignment of making military maps and conducting geographic surveys throughout China.

Later on, Chen introduced him to Wen Taizong, grandmaster of Yihe Quán (義和門拳 Giwamon-ken). Wen would take in Nakano as his student, training him for many years. In 1936 Wen formally passed his title of grandmaster of Yihe Quán to Nakano, at the Mount Song Shaolin Monastery, at Henan province. This version of events is contested by martial arts historians such as Donn Draeger, who argues that, "[f]or Nakano to suggest that he, a foreigner, could succeed to a position of leadership over a Chinese martial arts tradition is to deliberately ignore Chinese tradition and to insult the intelligence of those whom he would have believe his claim". Donn Draeger also mentions a court case in which the Shaolin Temple made a case against Shorinji Kempo, but to which no relevant court documents or evidence can be found or have surfaced.

In the final days of the Second World War, the Soviet Union broke its neutrality pact with Japan, and declared war. On 9 August 1945, the Soviets invaded Manchuria, and overran the Japanese in 11 days. The aftermath was appalling; Japanese casualties were tenfold to that of the Soviets's; wounded Japanese soldiers were left behind to die while the army retreated; and many Japanese civilians committed mass suicide. Sō was living in Manchuria during the Soviet invasion; he would witness such atrocities. He managed to escape to Japan with the help of his friends in Chinese secret societies, finally being repatriated in 1946.

== Establishment of Shōrinji Kempō and later life ==
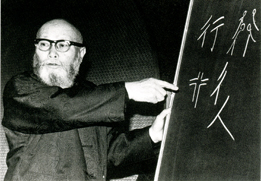
Sō while teaching.

The grim state of affairs in postwar Japan impressed him with the need of a restoration of morality and national pride and the creation of an entirely new human image. Regarding the Dharma spirit and the practice of Kempo as means to achieve these ends, Sō revised, expanded, and systematized the many forms of quan fa he had learned in China, combined it with the Jūjutsu he had learned from his grandfather in his youth, and thus created Shorinji Kempo as it exists today. During this time he changed his surname to Sō and started to use the on'yomi variant of his given name: Dōshin.

Many sources claim that Doshin So trained in Hakkō-ryū Jūjutsu and that techniques from there was incorporated in Shorinji Kempo. However, the Shorinji Kempo headquarters has no records of this and the records of the Hakkō-ryū organization merely show that he sat in on a few sessions. Any implication that Hakkō-ryū may have had on Shorinji Kempo would have been very minor since he got back to Japan in 1946 and Shorinji Kempo was founded the following year (Hakkō-ryū was founded in 1941 when Sō was still in Manchuria).

In 1979 he was invited to China by the Chinese government and asked to reintroduce quan fa to the Shaolin temple. He died of heart disease one year later (May 12, 1980), before he could take up this task. However, since being founded in Japan, Shorinji Kempo has spread to 33 different countries with over 1.5 million members and is organized in the World Shorinji Kempo Organization, currently governed by his senior pupils and his grandson Kouma Sō.

== Personal life ==
Dōshin Sō was married three times. He had two daughters in his first marriage, no children in the second, and one daughter in the third marriage.

Dōshin Sō married Takada Toyoko in March 1934, while he was still training in Henan. Their first daughter, Nakano Tomiko, was born on 10 January 1935, and their second daughter, Nakano Michiko, was born on 10 October 1937.

Whilst in Manchuria he met Manabe Michiyo in a train and a year later they started living together. Then on 23 January 1941 he divorced Toyoko. He married Michiyo on 10 August 1943. In 1956 he divorced Michiyo by mutual consent, although they had been separated for many years prior.

Nearly 10 years after the foundation of Shorinji Kempo, Dōshin Sō married Harada Emiko on 20 January 1957, with whom he would remain with until the end of his life. Their daughter, Nakano Yūki, was born subsequently on 1 November 1957.

== Depiction in media ==
Doshin So (left) instructs Sonny Chiba (right) in the martial arts film Shorinji Kempo (1975)

So was played by Japanese actor Sonny Chiba in the martial arts film Shorinji Kempo in 1975, which was given the exploitative English title The Killing Machine.
