= Gyaku Jūji-jime =

Judo technique

- Classification: Katame-waza
- Sub classification: Shime-waza
- Targets: Carotid arteries
- Kodokan: Yes

Technique name
- Rōmaji: Gyaku Jūji-jime
- Japanese: 逆十字絞
- English: Reverse cross strangle

Gyaku Jūji-jime (逆十字絞), or gyakujujijime, is a chokehold in judo. It is one of the twelve constriction techniques of Kodokan Judo in the Shime-waza list. Danzan Ryu includes this technique in the Shimete list under the name Namijujijime. Ura-Juji-Jime is described in the Canon Of Judo and demonstrated in The Essence of Judo by Kyuzo Mifune.

The technique is called 'reverse' because the palms of the person applying the choke are facing the person who is applying the choke. The thumbs are on top, outside of the clothing and the fingers grab inside underneath the gi or clothing. The hands are high up each side of the neck. Scissoring the hands applies pressure to the carotid arteries reducing blood flow, rapidly resulting in loss of consciousness. In judo, this technique is always taught under strict supervision and is similarly closely observed by referees in competition.

== Examples of contest this finished ==
- 2018 World Judo Championships – Men's 90 kg Bronze medal match

Loss Eduard Trippel (GER) (1:55 Kata-Juji-Jime) Axel Clerget (FRA)Win
- Video (This movie can not be seen in Japan etc.)
- Video Judo(IJF)channel "Highlights Judo For The World - BAKU WORLD JUDO CHAMPIONSHIPS 2018 (32m5s - )" on YouTube

== See also ==
- The Canon Of Judo
- Nami-Juji-Jime
- Kata-Juji-Jime
- Brazilian Jiu-Jitsu, Theory and Technique
