= Kodokan–Totsuka rivalry =

Rivalry between Kodokan school of judo and Totsuka school of jujutsu

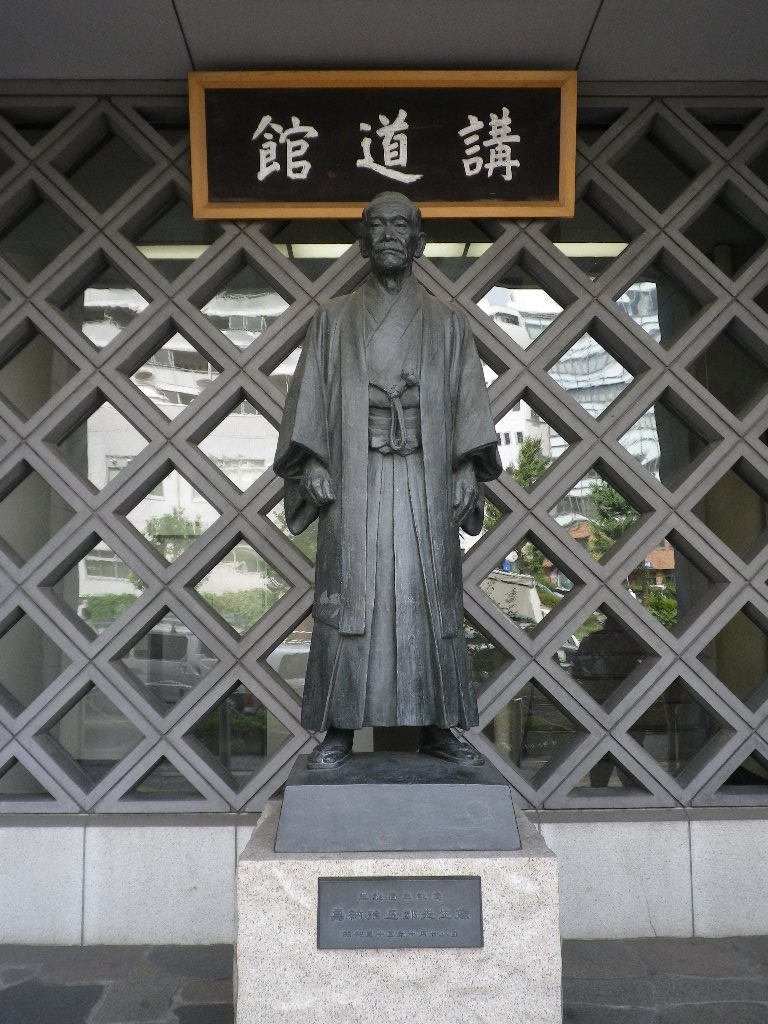
Statue of Jigoro Kano at the Kodokan institute.

The rivalry between the Kodokan school of judo and the Totsuka school of Yoshin-ryu jujutsu happened in the 1880s during the Meiji Era in Japan. Consisting of several challenges and tournaments, its result saw the decline of the traditional jujutsu schools and the rise of judo as an institutionalized martial art. Although surrounded in controversy and legend because of inconsistent sources, it has been considered a vital part of the history of judo.

== Background ==
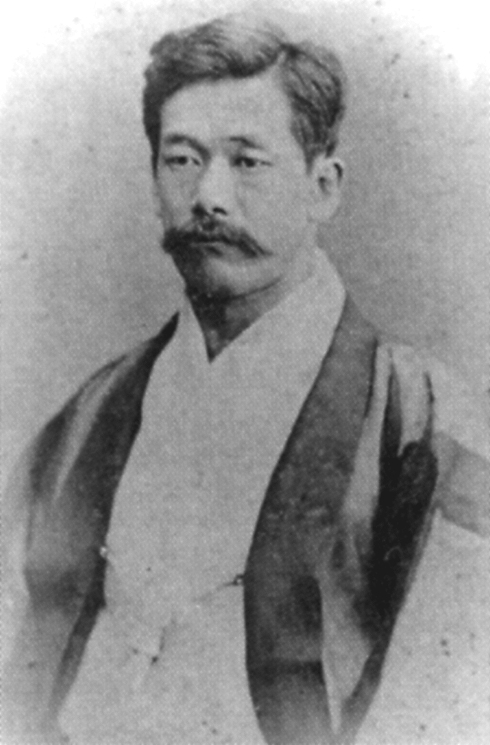
Kano at the age of 28.

The Yoshin-ryū school, most specifically the branch founded by Hikosuke Totsuka, had been considered Japan's biggest and most influential koryu jujutsu school since the end of the Bakumatsu period in 1868. Though based in Chiba, it had its main field of operations in Tokyo and was reputed to have three thousand trainees in that city alone. By contrast, the Kodokan school wasn't created until 1882, when a practitioner of the Kitō-ryū and Tenshin Shinyō-ryū styles named Jigoro Kano established the foundations of his own martial discipline, judo, with a handful of apprentices. The fast rise in popularity and success of the Kodokan was a source of conflict with other jujutsu schools in the nation, among them the Totsuka Yoshin-ryū, which saw Kano's style as a threat to its hegemony and a sign of disrespect to older traditions.

The first recorded contact between Kano and the Totsuka Yoshin-ryū happened before the founding of Kodokan, when Kano was still a student in Tokyo University and a mere jujutsu apprentice. During an exhibition of the Yoshin-ryū style, hosted by the university authorities in 1880 and directed by Hikosuke's son Hidemi Totsuka, the young Kano left the spectator seats and joined the jujutsukas during their randori in order to test his own skills. Kano was dominated, being dragged around by his opponent without managing to score a point. His performance was good enough to avoid a defeat and earn a draw, however, which attracted the praise of Totsuka himself, but the experience also served as a motivation to hone his abilities. The act was witnessed by Dr. Erwin Balz, an associate of the Totsuka school, who described other Tokyo students trying their luck along with Kano, with similar results.

Kano continued his jujutsu apprenticeship and established his school, Kodokan (popularly called "Kano-ryū" or "Kodokan-ryū" by other factions), in 1882. Soon after, he and his followers found themselves subject to the practice of dojoyaburi (道場破り, dojoyaburi; "dojo storming"), where fighters from other jujutsu schools would come to the building to challenge the residents to fight. Duels between members of different schools were called taryujiai (他流試合, taryujiai; "different style shiai") and were brutal competitions with few rules, accepted for the sake of their schools' reputation. The jujutsukas's opposition to the Kodokan was fuelled not only by martial rivalry, but also by Kano's incorporation of modern and foreign ideas and his role as an educator and intellectual man. About this period, Kano would write, "It seemed that the Kōdōkan had to take on the whole of Japan." However, the Totsuka school and its associates would be its main adversary.

== First challenges ==
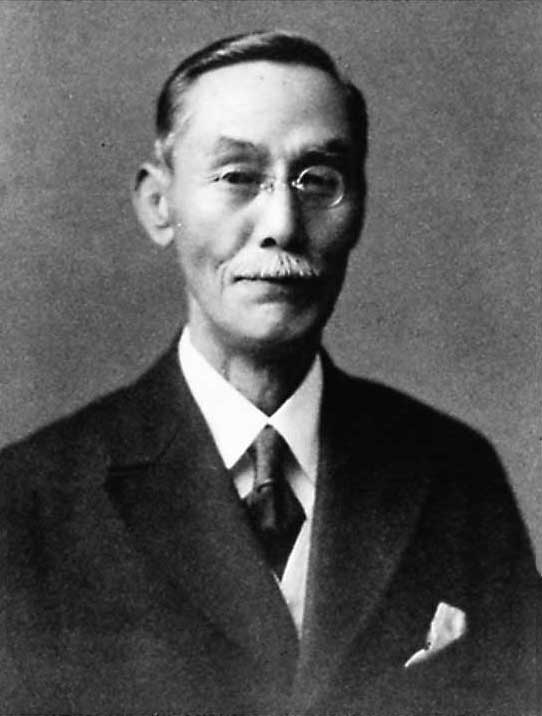
An older Tsunejiro Tomita.

According to chronicles by Tsunejiro Tomita and his son Tsuneo, the first taryujiai against a Totsuka member was in 1885. Daihachi Ichikawa, a master of Tenshin Shinyō-ryū affiliated to Totsuka, had opened his own dojo in Tokyo, and Kano and six followers paid a visit. The judokas practiced randori with the resident jujutsukas and other guests, but among all of them Shiro Saigo, the Kodokan's top apprentice, stood out, throwing down all of his sparring partners with ease. In response, Ichikawa himself visited the Kodokan shortly thereafter, accompanied by Matsugoro Okuda and Morikichi Otake from Totsuka Yoshin-ryū. They demanded a challenge, but Kano was out that day, so Saigo and Tomita decided to accept in his absence. Saigo fought Okuda who, despite being taller and heavier, was thrown down repeatedly by koshi nage and deashi barai before being finished by yama arashi. Okuda suffered a concussion and had to be carried away. Despite the victory, Kano was not pleased with the match when he found out, as he thought his apprentices had shown themselves too eager to fight.

In 1886, another Tenshin Shinyō-ryū dojo was opened in Tokyo, this time by master Magoroku Hachitani. Kano could not assist, but he sent Tomita, Takisaburo Tobari and several other Kodokan trainees to pay the obliged visit. However, when Tomita was performing randori with Mamoru, Magoroku's 14 year old son, he was approached by Hansuke Nakamura from Ryoi Shinto-ryū. A police hand-to-hand instructor with ties to the Totsuka school, Nakamura wanted revenge for his associates and challenged Tomita to a match. The latter described himself as too scared to accept, as Nakamura was much heavier and more experienced, but he eventually accepted. As soon as the match started, Tomita immediately scored a tomoe nage, and he repeated the technique two more times before his shocked opponent managed to block it. The judoka followed with an ouchi gari, which Nakamura blocked, and a hiza guruma, which seemed successful, but the jujutsuka pulled Tomita to the ground and tried to pin him with kami-shiho-gatame. In the process, however, Tomita locked a gyaku-juji-jime from the bottom. Trapped in the chokehold, Nakamura showed signs of hypoxia, so Hachitani stopped the match before he lost consciousness. Word of the Kodokan's victory spread quickly.

Aside from Tomita's own version of the facts, Nakamura's apprentice Kazuo Ishibashi spoke about the fight in his memoir, stating the loss drove Nakamura to stop drinking alcohol and start training intensely to get retribution from the Kodokan. A measure of revenge for the Totsuka school would be obtained by its member Taro Terushima, who reportedly dominated judoka Sumitomo Arima at the Ichikawa dojo later in the year.

== Police tournaments ==
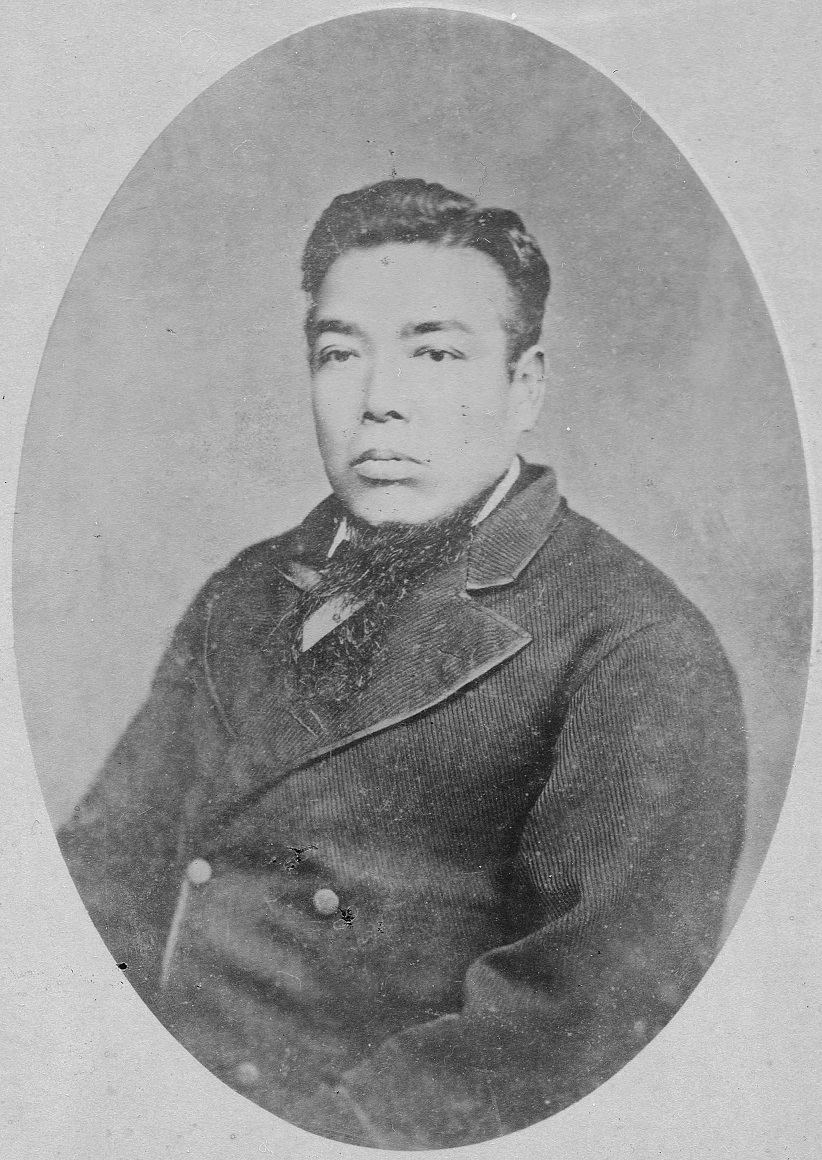
Viscount Michitsune Mishima, chief of the Metropolitan Police.

The main clash between the Kodokan and the Totsuka schools would happen by mediation of Michitsune Mishima, prefect of the Tokyo Metropolitan Police Department from 1885 to 1888. Known for his political approach to "abolish the old and bring the new", Mishima was interested in renovating the hand-to-hand methods and teachers of the police, until then monopolized by the Totsuka Yoshin-ryū and other minor koryu jujutsu factions. Upon hearing of the Kodokan's increasing fame, Mishima wanted them to test the efficacy of their art against the traditional jujutsu. In order to accomplish it, the Kodokan was asked to send judokas to one or more Metropolitan Police Department Martial Arts Tournaments (警視庁武術大会, Keishicho Bujutsu Taikai). It is acknowledged that the victory at these tournaments was the factor that turned judo from an obscure school to Japan's peak martial art.

Categorization of those events meets an obstacle in the absence of direct registers and the relative disparity of existent sources. The Kodokan keeps no clear register on the matter, and this has been noted to have given birth to folklore and legends. It has been even said that the memories of those challenges are purely fictitious propaganda, although, as judo historian Sanzo Maruyama notes, it is difficult to understand judo's expansion without its victories over jujutsu. Counting on their veracity, it has been suggested there were more than a single tournament, which would have caused the confusion of dates and matches among the sources, as well that their police affiliation would have rendered the events private and away from public sources.

The rules of the events are unknown. Sakujiro Yokoyama wrote that challenge matches of the time were harsh and brutal, often ending in death of participants, but the ruleset employed by the Metropolitan Police Department was described as comparatively more "civilized", presumably wanting to test what fighting system was the best for their non-lethal arresting techniques. It is apparent that matches could be won by either submission or referee stoppage, otherwise ending in a hikiwake or time limit draw. Judging for the attestations, it also seems both throws and submissions (or at least chokeholds) were allowed, while tactics like stalling or remaining disengaged on the ground were not penalized either. Some voices have claimed those rules gave the advantage to the judo side, but late commentators like Hajime Isogai have noted that the open format would have favored precisely the jujutsu side, who would have used the ground to avoid the judokas's superior wrestling. Finally, Maruyama described judokas as wearing their signature judogi, though in the short-sleeved, short-legged version used at the time, while the jujutsukas would wear a combination of haori and hakama, only shortened over the knees in order to allow for free movement.

=== First possible challenge ===
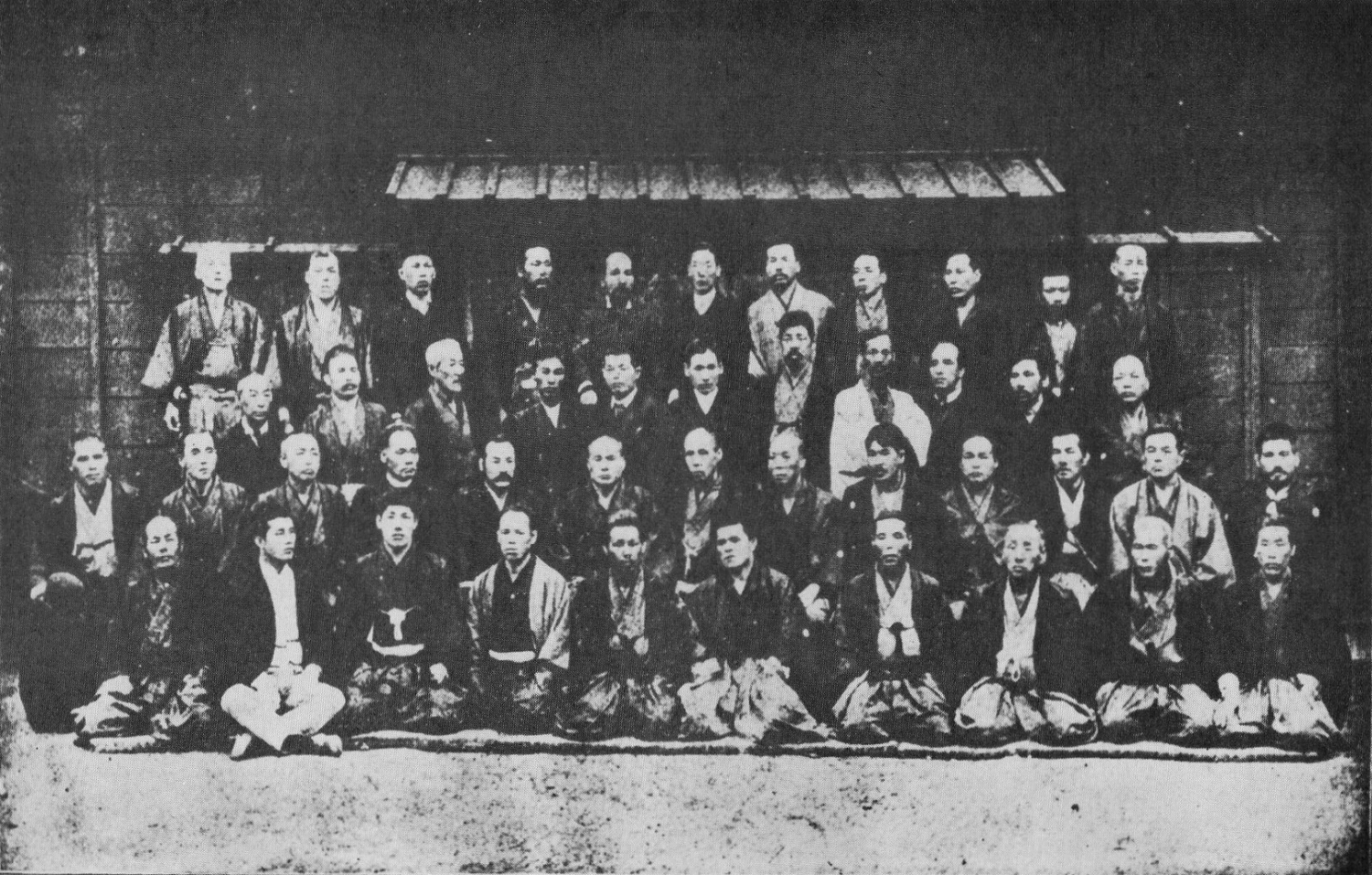
Jujutsu masters involved, featuring Hisatomi and Tobari at the first row; Sato, Oshima and Nakamura at the second; Imai at the third; and Kochi and Samura at the fourth.

According to Kano's memories, an earlier police tournament that cannot be identified with the more famous Kodokan victory took place in 1886. The Kodokan was asked to send representatives to an event of both kenjutsu and jujutsu hosted by the Metropolitan Police. Although neither Saigo nor Tomita could attend the event, Kano could send Yoshitsugu Yamashita, Sakujiro Yokoyama, Takisaburo Tobari and Noritaka Sato, among others. Kano notes the competition was quite tough, as although the judokas were able to execute their tachi-waza or throwing techniques, several of them were in difficulty against the ne-waza or groundfighting expertise of the Totsuka Yoshin-ryū. This occurrence makes the account end in a low note, and is mentioned to have been a reason for the Kodokan to reinforce their own ne-waza training.

=== Yayoi shrine challenge ===
The most mentioned of the judo and jujutsu challenges is the Yayoi Shrine Martial Arts Tournament (弥生神社武術大会, Yayoijinja Bujutsu Taikai), which would have had place in the Yayoi Shrine at Shiba Park in front of Mishima himself. Kano's and Tsuneo Tomita's accounts give the date as 1888, just before Mishima's death, a date indirectly supported by Yokoyama and considered more probable by Maruyama. Meanwhile, Yamashita and Itsuro Munakata (as interviewed by Maruyama) remember the year as 1886, the same as the rest of challenges.

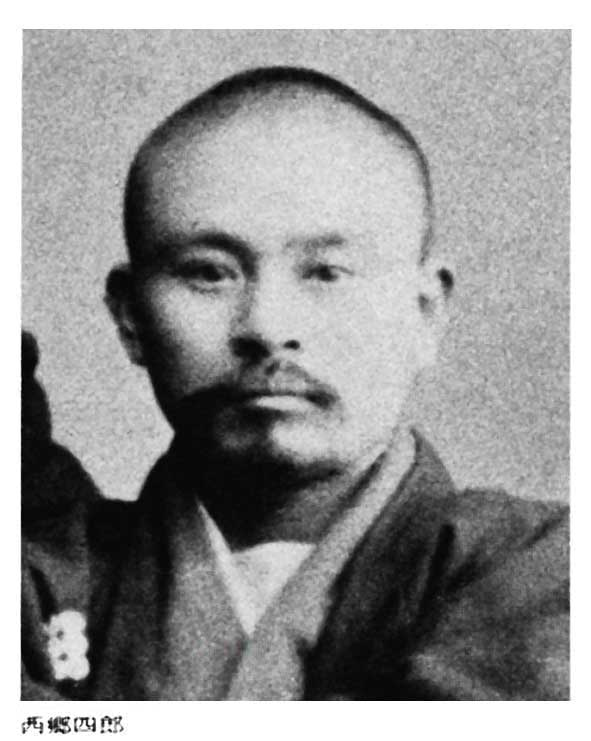
Shiro Saigo.

The main participants at the side of the Kodokan would have been Saigo, Yamashita, Tomita, Yokoyama, later known as the "Kodokan Shitenno" or "The Four Guardians of Kodokan". Along with them, it would have been Hoken Sato (later known as Hoken Iwasaki), Itsuro Munakata, Takejiro Yuasa, Bunzo Matsuda, Matsujiro Honda, Katsutaro Oda, Keijiro Kawai, Katsukazu Otsubo, Shizuya Iwanami, and other members. The Totsuka school would have been represented by Totsuka's own "Shitenno" or "Four Guardians", Taro Terushima, Entaro Kochi, Teisuke Nishimura and Shintaro Katayama, along with other fighters. The referees were Tetsutaro Hisatomi and Yuhachiro Suzuki from Sekiguchi-ryū.

According to most sources, the atmosphere of the event was heated. The Kodokan team was received with insults by the opposite team, most notably "shosai" (書生, shosai; student), which referenced not only the Kodokan's relatively short age compared to the traditional jujutsu schools, but also to the college background of many of the judokas compared to the martial upbringing of most jujutsukas. Munakata stated that the judokas performed a respectful full kneeling bow or za rei (座礼, zarei), meant to address a superior, while the jujutsukas adhered to the one-handed, one-kneed bow of the old styles, meant to address in equal terms.

- The first match would have been Yoshiaki Yamashita from Kodokan against Taro Terushima from Totsuka Yoshin. They were said to be the same size, with Terushima being slightly older. Terushima started attempting an ouchi gari, but Yamashita blocked it and answered scoring easily a hiza guruma. Terushima opted to remain on the ground, where he judged himself to be more skilled. Yamashita engaged him nonetheless, and they grappled until the referee called to end the match as a draw.
- The second match, as described by Yamashita, saw Shizuya Iwanami from Kodokan against Shintaro Katayama from Totsuka. Feeling Katayama was uncharacteristically proficient at throwing for a Yoshin-ryū jujutsuka, Iwanami clinched him tightly after gripping. From there, the judoka surreptitiously locked a standing juji-jime, and although Katayama tried to break it, the jujutsuka was choked out and fell unconscious. Kano has this match fought by Kawai instead of Iwanami.

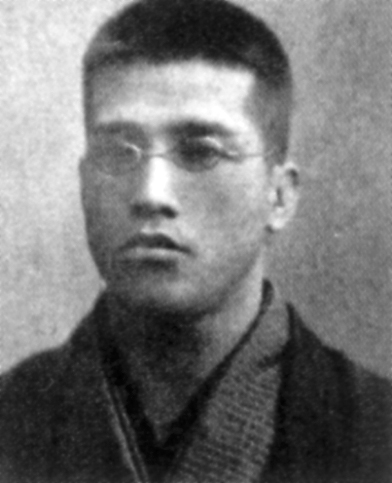
Yoshitsugu Yamashita.

- The third match was between Shiro Saigo from Kodokan and Entaro Kochi from Totsuka. Kochi was apparently much heavier than Saigo, to the point they were described as looking like a child and an adult, but Saigo's renowned skill rendered the fight a back-and-forth affair. Kochi dragged Saigo around and tried to throw him by harai goshi and uchi mata, but the judoka defended by slipping out of throws and landing on his knees and arms when thrown. Saigo then tried to come back with tomoe nage, only to Kochi to block it with his greater strength. After many minutes passed, however, Kochi started showing signs of fatigue, and Saigo succeeded at using his momentum against him to throw him with yama arashi. Although tired and hit on his head, Kochi got up and tried unsuccessfully to throw the nimble Saigo, who in turn scored another yama arashi in a failed ouchi gari attempt. This time, Kochi was thrown in a wrong angle and his shoulder was injured, which drove him to give up.
- Hokken Sato from Kodokan fought Teisuke Nishimura from Totsuka, apparently winning the bout.
- Katsutaro Oda from Kodokan is described as having fought to a hikiwake, or draw, against an unidentified opponent.
- Itsuro Munakata fought another unidentified opponent. According to both Yamashita and himself, he got carried by the success of his partners and attacked carelessly, which allowed his opponent to throw him down. As this was effectively an upset, both authors focus on it and skip the match's official result, but Tsuneo Tomita adds that the match kept on after the throw, with Munakata ultimately coming back and locking a juji-jime from the bottom for the win.

In total, the Kodokan won the vast majority of the fights, with only a few draws and possibly a pair of losses. The exact number of bouts is unknown; although the large number of cited names supports the traditional estimation of 15, it doesn't establish a difference between fighters and cornermen, nor between tournament matches and possible inter-school special bouts.

=== Yokoyama-Nakamura match ===
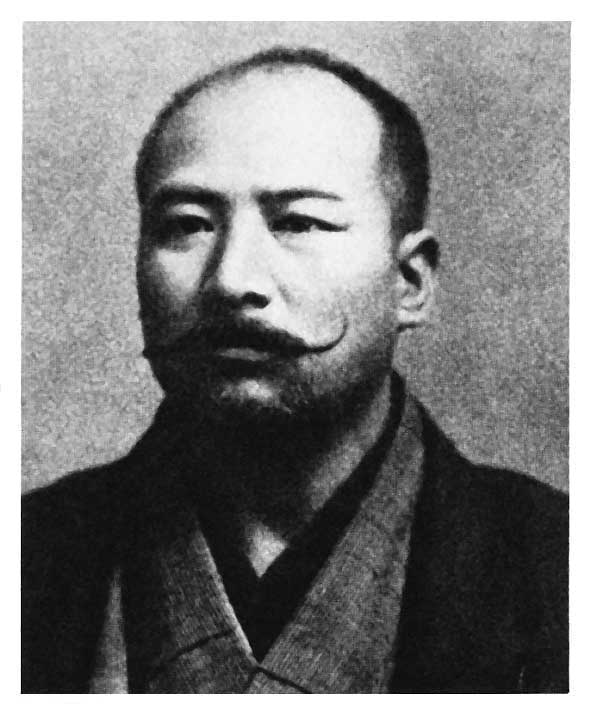
Sakujiro Yokoyama.

One of the best known bouts of the rivalry was the one pitting Sakujiro Yokoyama from Kodokan against Hansuke Nakamura, who was fighting at the Totsuka side in the search of retribution for his loss to Tomita. The match is consistently described by several authors, among them Nakamura's own assistant Ishibashi, but its date and place are less defined: it is traditionally considered by Western sources as yet another match of the Yayoi police tournament, but Yokoyama and Ishibashi present it as a separate individual challenge between the two contenders, hosted in the Marunouchi police station and also overseen by Mishima.

The bout received an enormous deal of attention due to its surrounding circumstances. The 23 years old Yokoyama was known by his great size (173 cm and 86 kg) and had just defeated renowned Takenouchi Santo-ryu master Masaaki Samura in another previous duel. In contrast, while Nakamura had the disadvantage of being 19 years older, he was even larger than Yokoyama (being 176 cm and 94 kg himself) and had undergone a strenuous training since his defeat against Tomita, to the point he could now hang from his neck without feeling pain. The affair would be refereed by Tetsutaro Hisatomi and supervised by viscount Mishima again.

Yokoyama opened the fight throwing Nakamura down with deashi barai. He was then about to pin him with kami-shiho-gatame, but Nakamura immediately reversed and pinned Yokoyama with his own kami-shiho-gatame. Although Sakujiro was able to escape with great effort and score a harai goshi that floored the jujutsuka, he did not follow him to the ground, as he now knew Hansuke was dangerous at ne-waza. Similarly, Hansuke remained on one knee on the ground challenging him to grapple, knowing Sakujiro was superior on the stand-up. From this point, the fighters continued trying to escape their opponent's field of strength while attempting to bring him to their own, until the draw was called at 55 minutes. In total, they fought half an hour standing and 25 minutes on the ground, and they were rendered so tired that the referee had to forcefully pry their numb fingers apart to separate them when the match ended.

Despite the draw, Yokoyama received positive reviews for his performance and was given the nickname of "oni" (鬼, oni; "ogre" or "demon"). Nevertheless, he later wrote that he thought he was going to die during the bout, though also stated he was willing to do it. Anyway, as the match lacked a result, commentators settled it down by nicknaming Yokoyama as the "Champion of the West" (西の横綱, nishi no yokozuna) and Nakamura as the "Champion of the East" (東の横綱, azuma no yokozuna). According to Ishibashi, Nakamura and Yokoyama formed a friendship after the match.

== Aftermath ==
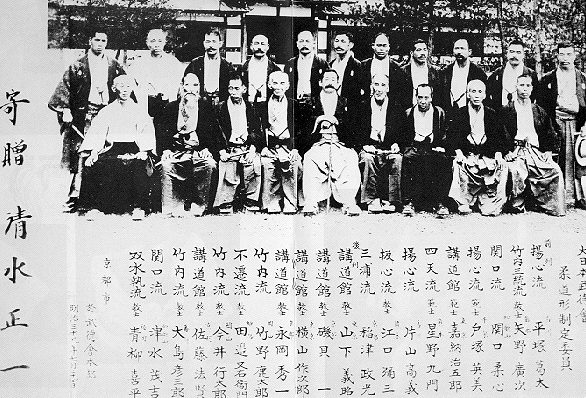
Jujutsu masters at the Butoku Kai, with Jigoro Kano at the center. Also featuring Hidemi Totsuka at Kano's right, and Ōshima, Imai and Tanabe at the back row.

The results of the police tournament were sound enough to convince Mishima of the superiority of the Kodokan method. The Metropolitan Police Department immediately requested the Kodokan to send teachers to their stations, with Yamashita and Yokoyama being the first ones, and those were increasingly favored over the ones from the Totsuka Yoshin-ryu. The latter lost its place in the martial landscape of Japan and faded gradually through the years while judo grew and became the dominant martial art in the nation. Their rise was such that Tsunejiro Tomita later compared the Kodokan–Totsuka rivalry to the historical Battle of Sekigahara, where the regency of the Toyotomi clan and the regional power of the daimyō were forced to pledge to the unified Tokugawa shogunate. He also wrote that "since the Kodokan's founding ten years ago, we have flattened the jujutsu nation across the country." When the Dai Nippon Butoku Kai opened a jujutsu division in 1895, Kano was elected its chairman, and he personally led the standardization of the rules and katas over the rest of jujutsu schools of the country.

Despite the victory, individual challenges continued for a while. According to Tsuneo Tomita, Yoshiaki Yamashita still defeated Taro Terushima in a rematch of their challenge bout, with the judoka winning by ippon seoi nage. Similarly, Yokoyama would beat his own rival Nakamura by harai makikomi in another rematch, after which Nakamura would join them as a guest for a multitudinous jujutsu exhibition, being paired with Yokoyama's former master Keitaro Inoue. Shiro Saigo, however, would face a final challenge from a Totsuka fighter, Shuzaburo Sano, who outweighed him by 30 kg and was known for his strength feats. Sano countered Saigo's yama arashi and pinned him, but the judoka caught him in an ude-gatame from the bottom and forced him to give up. After those, as a sign of the influence of judo, Totsuka masters like Kinsaku Yamamoto would join the Kodokan and contribute to their techniques, as well as practitioners from other factions like Takeuchi Santo-ryū.

With the Totsuka school removed from their horizon, the Kodokan school would never confront another large scale challenge from any jujutsu school. The only opposition of this kind they would face came from select masters of the Takenouchi-ryū school, mainly Hikosaburo Ōshima, Kōtarō Imai, Senjuro Kanaya and an associate from Fusen-ryū, Mataemon Tanabe. As they were not associated to the Totsuka faction, they still shared space with Kodokan teachers at the Metropolitan Police Department for years, producing several interschool matches with varied results. Tanabe himself became known for defeating multiple judokas thanks to his newaza expertise, though his faction ultimately failed to achieve popularity, and his apprentices would eventually become part of judo as well. His influence, however, remained in the rising kosen judo circuit.
