= Hansuke Nakamura =

Japanese martial artist

- Born: November 16, 1845; Kurume, Chikugo Province, Japan
- Died: 1897 (aged 51–52); Japan
- Native name: 中村半助
- Nationality: Japanese
- Style: Ryōi Shintō-ryū
- Teacher: Saizo Shimosaka

Hansuke Nakamura (中村半助, Nakamura Hansuke; 1845-1897) was a Japanese jujutsu practitioner. He was one of the best regarded jujutsu stylists in Japan before the rise of judo, and remains as the most famous exponent of the Ryōi Shintō-ryū school.

== Biography ==
=== First challenges ===
The son of feudal lord Hanzaemon Nakamura, he was born under the given name of Kinpachi before adopting Hansuke. He started his training under Ryōi Shintō-ryū master Saizo Shimosaka, and eventually known as a fearsome fighter not only due to his skill, but also to his large size for a Japanese man of his time, being 1,76m tall. Through the years Nakamura, his training partner Shogo Uehara and the Sekiguchi-ryū artists Tetsutaro Hisatomi and Danzo Naka were known as the four strongest jujutsu fighters in Kurume, reaching fame throughout the entire nation.

When the Meiji Restoration caused the Nakamura clan to be dissolved in 1868, Hansuke became a fisherman and a sake brewer in order to make a living, yet he didn't stop practicing his art. The same year, he fought a challenge match against Genshin Eguchi from the Kyushin-ryū, a rival faction from Higo Province. Nakamura won the match, breaking Eguchi's arm with an armbar, but the scuffle was so brutal that Eguchi tried to escape the hold by gruesomely biting Nakamura's leg. The bout was witnessed by Masaaki Samura from Takeuchi Santo-ryū, another rival school, and this ensured a bout between Nakamura and him the next year.

The challenge happened at the dojo of Genshin's older brother Yamon, also in Kumamoto. Nakamura started by kneeling down to goad Samura to go to newaza, where he was skilled, but Samura refused to engage. When Nakamura was getting up, Samura attacked him with atemi strikes, which Nakamura answered to by scoring a high throw. However, Samura rolled off with ukemi, and after entangling again he surprisingly captured Nakamura's back, locking a hadaka jime for the victory.

=== At the Metropolitan police ===
In 1877, by mediation of his master Shimosaka, Nakamura became a hand-to-hand instructor for several police services, among them the prestigious Tokyo Metropolitan Police Department. He shared duties with Uehara, Hisatomi, Samura and Matsugoro Okuda, creating along them a special program to select aspiring policemen by their physical skills. Nakamura come to be known as one of the toughest men in Japan due to his strength and history of challenges.

While working in the police, Nakamura participated in another challenge between the Ryōi Shintō-ryū and Takeuchi Santo-ryū, facing this time Koji Yano in 1881. Unlike the previous, Nakamura dominated easily the match, pinning Yano under kami shiho gatame, but Yano fouled by biting Nakamura in the chest from underneath. The match was stopped against Nakamura's wishes by Samura, who saw his teammate's act as dishonorable, and it took Samura breaking Yano's teeth with his wooden chopsticks to make him release his bite.

Around 1883, Nakamura also fought Hidemi Totsuka, the son of renowned Yoshin-ryu master Hikosuke Totsuka, in a best of three. Hidemi, widely considered to be Nakamura's superior in technique, won the first time, but Nakamura rallied back and defeated him twice in return, winning the challenge.

=== Challenges on the Kodokan ===
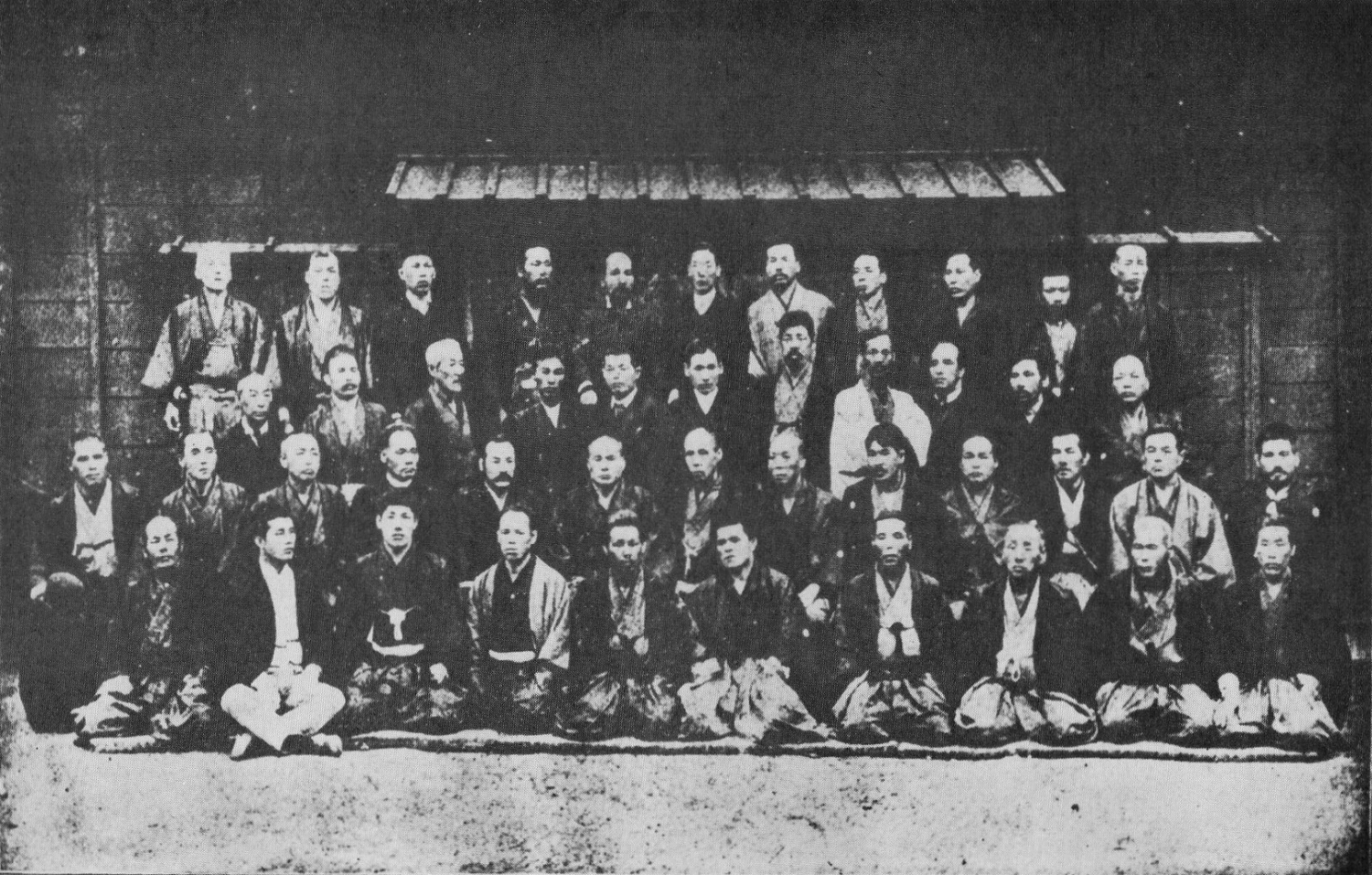
Nakamura (second row, eighth from the right) among other jujutsu masters in 1888.

In 1886, with the rise of Jigoro Kano and his Kodokan institute, Nakamura sided against them in behalf of Hikosuke Totsuka's Yōshin-ryū, the country's main jujutsu school. He challenged one of their members, Tsunejiro Tomita, during the opening of Magoroku Hachitani's Tenshin Shinyō-ryū dojo. However, as soon as the match started, Tomita immediately scored a tomoe nage, and he repeated the technique two more times before his shocked opponent managed to block it. The judoka followed with an ouchi gari, which Nakamura blocked, and a hiza guruma, which seemed successful, but the jujutsuka pulled Tomita to the ground and tried to pin him with kami-shiho-gatame. In the process, however, Tomita locked a gyaku-juji-jime from the bottom. Trapped in the chokehold, Nakamura showed signs of hypoxia, so Hachitani stopped the match before he lost consciousness.

Acknowledging he had completely underestimated the Kodokan technique, Nakamura subjected himself to harsh training in order to get revenge on a future rematch. He stopped drinking alcohol and strengthened his neck muscles to avoid being choked out again. In one of his preferred methods, he lied on a tatami with a balance pole placed over his throat while six people stood on it and struck it with shinai swords. As a result, Nakamura developed such a powerful neck that he could be hanged without suffocating or feeling pain.

His chance came during the Metropolitan Police Department Martial Arts Tournaments (警視庁武術大会, Keishicho Bujutsu Taikai), where teams from the Kodokan faced fighters from the Totsuka school. Nakamura faced off with Sakujiro Yokoyama, an opponent who was only slightly lighter than him, though much younger, and who had just defeated Nakamura's old rival Samura, in a match that became legendary. Yokoyama opened it throwing Nakamura down with deashi barai. He was then about to pin him with kami-shiho-gatame, but Nakamura immediately reversed and pinned Yokoyama with his own hold. Although Sakujiro was able to escape with great effort and score a harai goshi, he did not follow him to the ground, as he now knew Hansuke was dangerous at newaza. Similarly, Hansuke remained on one knee on the ground challenging him to grapple, knowing Sakujiro was superior on the stand-up.

From this point, the fighters continued trying to escape their opponent's field of strength while attempting to bring him to their own, until the draw was called at 55 minutes. In total, they fought half an hour standing and 25 minutes on the ground, and they were rendered so tired that the referee had to forcefully pry their numb fingers apart to separate them when the match ended. As they match lacked a result, commentators settled it down by nicknaming Yokoyama as the "Champion of the West" (西の横綱, nishi no yokozuna) and Nakamura as the "Champion of the East" (東の横綱, azuma no yokozuna). Nakamura and Yokoyama formed a friendship after the match.

=== Last years and legacy ===
Immediately after the Kodokan matches, Nakamura challenged again Masaaki Samura. This time Nakamura won, though details of the match are sparse. He also rematched Yokoyama, though being defeated by harai makikomi in a less well received bout. Afterwards, Nakamura joined the Kodokan for a multitudinous jujutsu exhibition, being paired with Yokoyama's former master Keitaro Inoue.

Nakamura died in 1897 at 52 years old, but he was immortalized by a character of Tsuneo Tomita's Sanshiro Sugata novel series, Hansuke Murai, who was directly based on him. Baku Yumemakura also wrote a novel series about Nakamura named Toten no Shishi ("The Lion of the East").
