= Yokoyama Sakujiro =

Japanese martial artist

Yokoyama Sakujirō
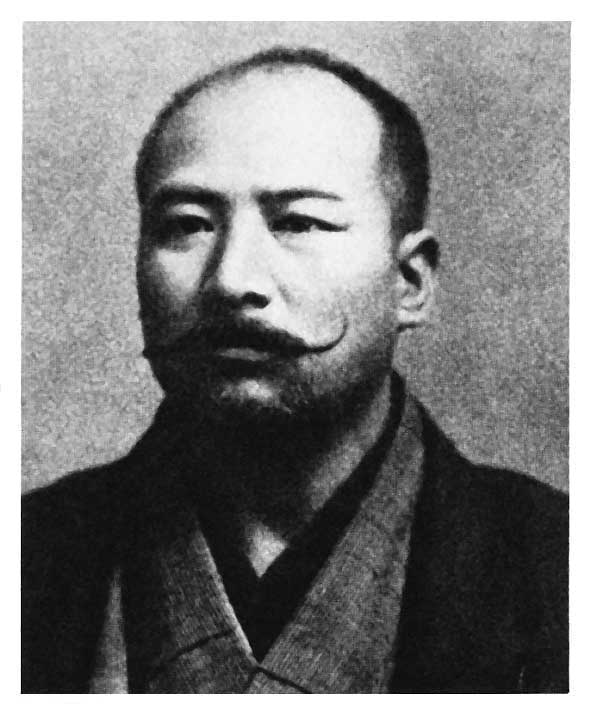
- Yokoyama Sakujirō, the Guardian of the Kōdōkan.
- Born: 1864; Edo, Japan
- Died: September 23, 1912 (aged 47–48); Esophageal cancer
- Native name: 横山 作次郎
- Nationality: Japan
- Style: Tenjin Shinyo ryu, Judo
- Teacher: Kanō Jigorō

Yokoyama Sakujirō (横山 作次郎; 1864 – September 23, 1912), was one of the earliest disciples of Kanō Jigorō. He was part of the Kōdōkan Shitennō or Four Guardians of the Kodokan along with Yoshitsugu Yamashita, Tsunejirō Tomita, and Shirō Saigō.

== Biography ==
=== Early life ===
Yokoyama was born in Saginomiya, Tokyo, Japan in 1864. He trained in Tenjin Shin'yō-ryū jujutsu under Keitaro Inoue in the Yushima Tenjin dojo, as well as Kitō-ryū under Tomiharu Mikami, all since his childhood. It's said that when he was just thirteen he wielded a katana and cut down a burglar that was trying to rob his parents' house. He later joined the police in Yamagata prefecture and possibly became a student of Daitō-ryū Aiki-jūjutsu of Takeda Sokaku for a time. Anyway, in April 1886, he came to the Kōdōkan dojo in order to present a dojoyaburi challenge, but pledged himself to Jigoro Kano's teachings when he was bested right there by the much smaller Shirō Saigō. Yokoyama further assisted Kano in establishing the Kōdōkan and its reputation.

Sakujiro was considered one of the most formidable judo experts of his time, which reflected in his nickname of "Demon Yokoyama" (鬼横山, Oni Yokoyama). He was known for his large size, violent fighting style and will to train and fight anytime. When he was not training at the dojo, Yokoyama was outside swinging around a heavy tetsubo in order to increase his strength, and he was said to carry always a thick rope in his attire, which he would use to drag and move rocks and logs he found in the road. His favourite throw (supposedly lost after his death) was referred as "tengu nage," a name come from another of his nicknames, "Tengu" (天狗), which was given by several superstitious porters when he beat them for disrespecting him in Hakone. Yokoyama was also an infamously harsh trainer who often attacked students without warning, telling them that they should watch in all times as if they were in the dojo.

=== Judo challenges ===
Yokoyama fought on behalf of the Kodokan for the first time also in 1886, when he was a part of the Kodokan team which fought the school Yoshin-ryu in the Kodokan-Totsuka rivalry. His most famous opponent, however, was not a member of Yoshin-ryu, but the Ryoi Shinto-Ryu jujutsuka Hansuke Nakamura, who had been called up by Totsuka as a reinforcement. Nicknamed the "Demon Slayer" and considered the toughest martial artist in Japan, Nakamura was as tall and heavy as Sakujiro himself, and it was said he was so strong that he could be hung by his neck without feeling any pain. Although much older than Yokoyama, Nakamura was also much heavier and had also subjected himself to a hard training in order to avenge a defeat suffered at Tomita's hands years before.

The match, refereed by Tetsutaro Hisatomi from Sekiguchi-ryu, lasted a total of 55 minutes. After struggling on their feet, Yokoyama threw Nakamura down with deashi barai and was about to pin him with kami-shiho-gatame, but Nakamura immediately reversed and pinned Yokoyama with his own kami-shiho-gatame. Although Sakujiro was able to escape with great effort and score a harai goshi that floored the jujutsuka, he did not follow him to the ground, as he now knew Hansuke was dangerous at ne-waza. Similarly, Hansuke remained on one knee on the ground challenging him to grapple, knowing Sakujiro was superior on the stand-up. With Nakamura being stood up by the referee, the two fighters resumed trying to escape from their opponent's field of strength while attempting to bring him to their own until the draw was called. In total, they fought half an hour standing and 25 minutes on the ground, and they were rendered so tired that the referee had to forcefully pry their numb fingers apart to separate them when the match ended. Sakujiro later wrote that he thought he was going to die during the bout.

After Sakujiro was awarded the 4º dan in 1888, he competed in a similar match against Senjuro Kanaya from the Takenouchi-ryū school. The match, which happened around 1890, was distinctly brutal. After Yokoyama blocked a tomoe nage attempt, his opponent's specialty, he tried a daki age, but Kanaya scissored his neck with his legs. Checking up he couldn't break the hold or pick Kanaya up, Yokoyama pushed forward until placing his opponent's head against the main pillar of the dojo and started ramming it against the column. As this happened at the last minute before the end of the match, the referee ended it in a draw. Nevertheless, this violent finish increased Sakujiro's reputation as the most feared fighter in Kodokan.

In 1894, Yokoyama met Hansuke Nakamura again a rematch of their 1886 encounter, and this time Sakujiro defeated him. The match was described as shorter and less energetic than the previous, reflecting their older ages. The same year, Nakamura was invited to do an exhibition in a Kodokan dojo, being paired with Yokoyama's own former master, Keitaro Inoue.

=== Late life ===
Yokoyama was awarded the seventh grade in October 1904, which was the highest dan in judo at the time.

E.J. Harrison, the English journalist, author and judoka, used a Judo anecdote from Yokoyama in his book The Fighting Spirit of Japan (published in 1913):

I remember during the early part of January, 1909, I went to a certain restaurant, accompanied by Mr. Kyuzo Mifune, a fifth Dan teacher of the Kodokan. We noticed in one corner of the room a group of thirteen young fellows drinking sake, while in an adjoining apartment there were an elderly couple and some other visitors taking food. The members of the first-named group were seen to be putting their heads together at frequent intervals and to be busily whispering, at the same time casting glances in our direction. I did not take any special notice of what was going on, nor did I suspect that they had any designs upon us. Mr. Mifune and I went on chatting over our drinks. Presently one of the rascals approached us, calmly picked up my overcoat and hat, and tried to make off with them under our very noses. Of course I remonstrated, when the thief, evidently bent on picking a quarrel, insisted that the coat and hat were his property. A warm altercation arose, in the midst of which he assumed a threatening attitude, and was speedily joined by half a dozen of his comrades from the other side of the room. There being no alternative, Mr. Mifune took a hand in the game. He avoided unnecessary roughness, but in less than a minute he had them all down with a succession of swift blows. Then the rest of the gang set upon me, but I knocked them down one after the other, and the affair was over in less than three minutes. As our victims regained consciousness they lost no time in making themselves scarce, but we detained one of them, and forced him to confess. He admitted that their object had been to extort money from us by intimidation. They had been misled by our good clothes and had imagined that we would be easy prey. We let the fellow go instead of handing him over to the police, as we considered he had received punishment enough at our hands. After the rascals had gone the old couple who had been interested spectators of the occurrence told us that they had just witnessed for the first time in their lives a practical display of jujutsu and were amazed at the wonderful feats which experts were able to perform against such odds.

In his later years, Yokoyama was recorded by fellow judoka Tsunetane Oda as having faced an unnamed jujutsu practitioner from the Kansai region who came to challenge the Kodokan. According to Oda's account, the challenger submitted the dojo's students before facing Yokoyama himself. Oda deliberately withheld the challenger's identity, noting only that the man represented Kansai — and that Yokoyama ultimately defeated him with his signature yoko-sutemi-waza technique. This account is distinct from the well-documented history of Mataemon Tanabe, the Fusen-ryū master, who repeatedly challenged Yokoyama but was consistently rebuffed — Yokoyama declined Tanabe's challenges on multiple occasions.

== Death ==
Yokoyama died on September 23, 1912, at the age of 49, from cancer of the esophagus, a condition linked to his heavy drinking.
