= Tetsutaro Hisatomi =

Japanese martial artist

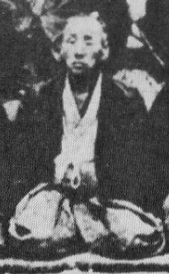
- Born: 1827; Kurume, Japan
- Died: 1898 (aged 70–71); Japan
- Native name: 久冨鉄太郎
- Nationality: Japanese
- Style: Shibukawa-ryū; Ryōi Shintō-ryū; Yōshin-ryū; Tenjin Shin'yō-ryū; Kyushin-ryū
- Teachers: Bangoro Shibukawa; Mataemon Iso; Hikosuke Totsuka

Tetsutaro Hisatomi (久冨鉄太郎, Hisatomi Tetsutaro; 1827-1898) was a Japanese jujutsu practitioner. He was considered one of the greatest of the late Edo and early Meiji period.

== Biography ==
Hisatomi was born in Kurume, Kyushu. He might have been born in 1827, although other sources imply he was already a child able to start his jujutsu training at the year. He learned under Bangoro Shibukawa of the Shibukawa-ryū, an offpsring of the Sekiguchi-ryu school, and he was soon among the four greatest jujutsu artists of Kyushu, along with Danzo Naka, Shogo Uehara and Hansuke Nakamura. Like Nakamura, Hisatomi was known for his large size (being 1,75 cm and 98 kg). In 1854, after 27 years of local career, he left for mainland Japan in order to learn new styles, carrying from Shibukawa the final lesson of always being prepared to die in every randori he fought.

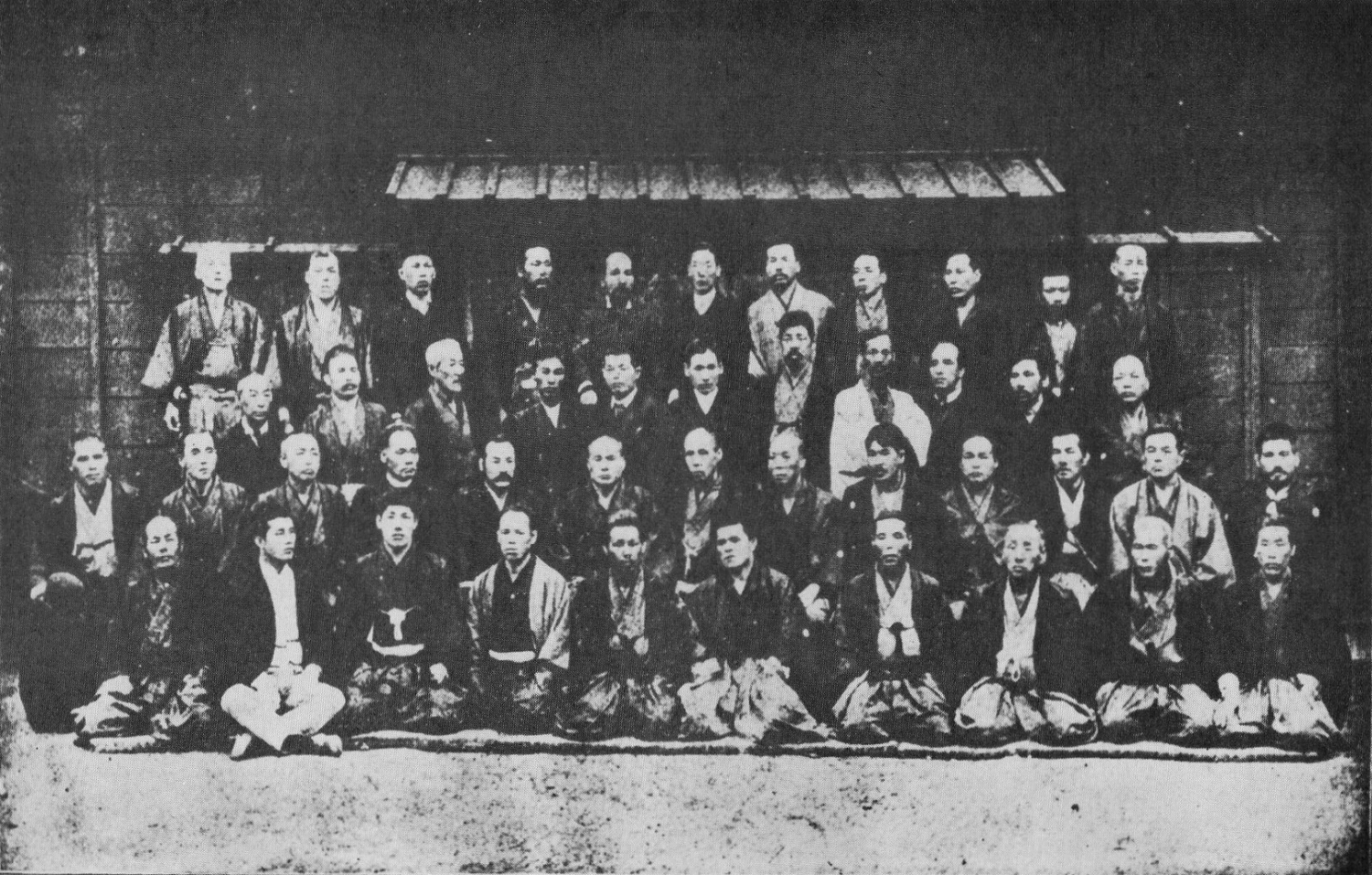
Jujutsu masters in 1888, featuring Hisatomi (first row, third from the right) and Nakamura (second row, eighth).

He first landed in Ōmi Province, where he briefly trained under Eizaemon Naomura of Kitō-ryū, but he did not like its ways and eventually moved to Tokyo, where he became a trainee under Hikosuke Totsuka of Yōshin-ryū at the Kobusho. He later expanded his apprenticeship to Mataemon Iso, founder of the Tenjin Shin'yō-ryū school, and fellow Kurume native Gorobei Shimosaka, of Ryōi Shintō-ryū. On April 19, 1859, fighting on behalf of Shimosaka, Hisatomi fought a challenge against Tenjin Shin'yō-ryū artists, losing to Otonojo Yamada yet defeating Teinosuke Yagi. The same date on 1863, in a similar challenge, Hisatomi dominated Chiyokichi Mochida (who later changed his name to Hachinosuke Fukuda) and Jiro Yamamoto, failing to finish them yet giving the best performance of his team that day.

In 1869, Hisatomi retired from jujutsu, but he returned in 1876 and moved to Tokyo full time to become a teacher. Three years later, he was appointed hand-to-hand instructor for the Tokyo Metropolitan Police Department. Around this time, he visited the dojo of Mataemon's grandson Masatomo for a challenge, earning him a match against Daihachi Ichikawa. Despite his much smaller physique, Ichikawa quickly rammed Hisatomi against a corner and choked him, forcing him to surrender. At the immediate rematch, Ichikawa landed a knee strike to Hisatomi's groin and locked another choke. Although the Shibukawa-ryu fighter picked Ichikawa up and slammed him in daki age, Ichikawa didn't release the hold, so Hisatomi eventually fell unconscious. After waking up, Hisatomi requested one more match, willing to fight to the end, but Iso ruled it out. Hisatomi subsequently praised highly their fighting technique.

In 1881, Hisatomi opened his own dojo. He later acted as a referee in the Metropolitan police tournaments during the Kodokan–Totsuka rivalry.
