= Matsugoro Okuda =

Japanese martial artist

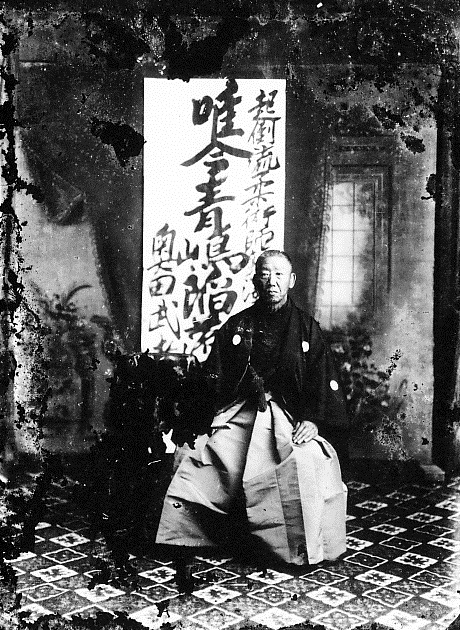
- Okuda in 1918.
- Born: July 8, 1854; Aizu, Mutsu Province, Japan
- Died: November 29, 1931 (aged 77); Morioka, Iwate, Japan
- Native name: 奥田松五郎
- Nationality: Japanese
- Style: Fukuno-ryū; Kitō-ryū; Tenjin Shinyō-ryū
- Teachers: Yoshikatsu Okuda; Takeshi Sawada

Matsugoro Okuda (奥田松五郎, Okuda Matsugoro; 1854–1931) was a Japanese martial artist. A master of several jujutsu styles, he was a contemporary to Jigoro Kano in the creation of a style that synthesized them all, and opposed the early judo movement before later joining it.

== Biography ==
Okuda started learning jujutsu from his childhood at the dojo of his father Yoshikatsu (also known as Mankichi Okuda). He first started in the native Fukuno-ryū style, but later branched off to the more popular Kitō-ryū and Tenjin Shinyō-ryū, training under master Takeshi Sawada.

=== Military career ===
He joined the Tokugawa shogunate's hatamoto force as a child, eventually becoming a liaison agent (連絡係, renraku-gakari) for Isami Kondo. Legend has that Okuda formed part of the Shinsengumi, and it was even rumored that he was one of the killers of Ryoma Sakamoto in 1867, but nothing of this was ever proven. In 1868, the young Okuda became part of the Shōgitai and participated in the Boshin War, managing to survive the loss of his unit at the Battle of Ueno.

In 1876, Okuda had the chance to meet Takamori Saigo, his former enemy in the Boshin War. Learning that Okuda was a jujutsu expert, Saigo hired him as an instructor in his samurai school in Kagoshima. However, with the beginning of the Satsuma Rebellion, Okuda resigned and moved to Yokohama, becoming a freelance jujutsu teacher.

=== Teaching in Tokyo ===
He eventually landed in Tokyo, where he fought in 1879 a challenge match against an American wrestler at the Shibusawa Library. Although Okuda was outweighed to the point of looking like a child next to his opponent, he won the match, throwing the American down with seoi nage and tomoe nage. The same year, Okuda opened a Kitō-ryū dojo, and became a hand-to-hand instructor for several police services, among them the prestigious Tokyo Metropolitan Police Department.

In 1884, while still a police teacher, Okuda created a personal jujutsu style, Okuda-ryū (奥田流, Okuda ryu), which integrated all the knowledge from the multiple styles he knew and researched. He aspired to integrate all the jujutsu styles in Japan, though it seems he never followed up with the idea. He did train with other stylists, mainly the eminent Yoshin-ryū school led by Hikosuke Totsuka, where he became friends with its exponent Morikichi Otake and fellow Tenjin Shinyō-ryū practitioner Daihachi Ichikawa. This alignment to the Totsuka school ironically pitted Okuda against another integrator of jujutsu, Jigoro Kano, whose Kodokan dojo was becoming infamous in the jujutsu community for its heterodoxy.

In 1885, Ichikawa, Otake and Okuda performed a dojoyaburi on the Kodokan, leading Okuda to fight a bout against Shiro Saigo. Though Okuda was taller and heavier, he was defeated, being thrown repeatedly by koshi nage and deashi barai before Saigō finished him by yama arashi. Okuda suffered a concussion and had to be carried away.

=== Retirement in Morioka ===
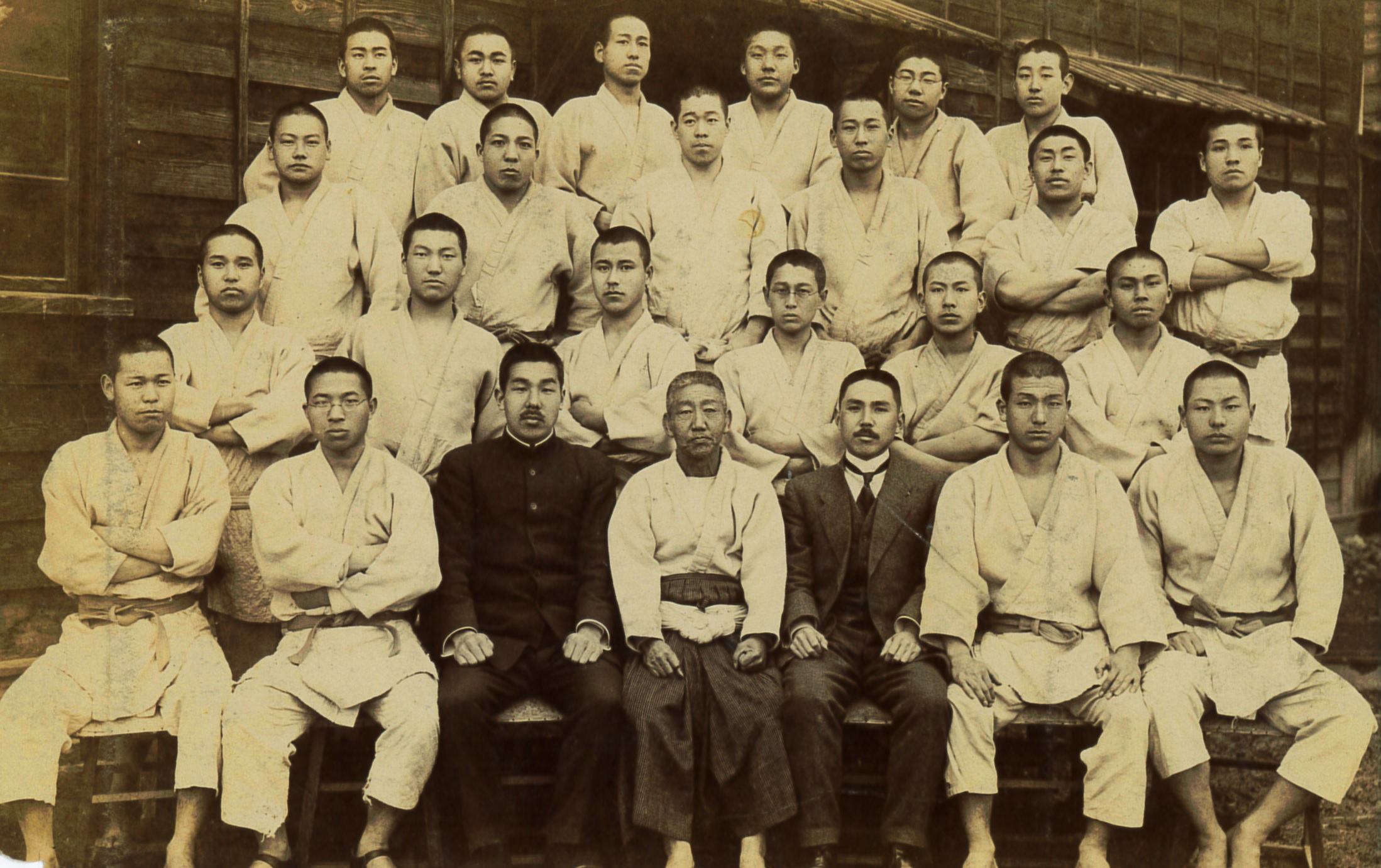
Okuda among his students in Morioka.

Okuda didn't participate further in the Kodokan-Totsuka rivalry, and in 1893 he moved his field of activity to the Iwate Prefecture by invitation of governor Ichizo Hattori. As a consequence, he was not among the jujutsu masters gathered by Kano at the Dai Nippon Butoku Kai to inaugurate its jujutsu division in 1895 either. However, Okuda would join at some point, being granted the title of honorary judo master (柔道範士, judo hanshi). In 1901, he opened a judo dojo in the city of Morioka, and he became a usual attender of tournaments and events while keeping his police teacher job. His high knowledge and personal approach to throws were popularly nicknamed his "assassination technique" (殺気の技, sakki no waza), possibly in reference to his purported participation in the killings of the Shinsengumi.

Okuda had a last highlight in 1903 when he received a young Kyuzo Mifune in his dojo in Morioka, sparring with him and throwing Mifune four times, though not without predicting Mifune would become a judo legend. Afterwards, he dedicated himself to teaching, becoming the master of judo historian Fukuichiro Haruyama. Okuda died in his house in 1931.
