= Kyushin-ryū =

Form of the martial art Jujutsu

Kyushin Ryu
- Ko-ryū
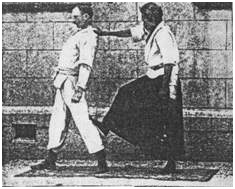
- Shihan Yoshinori (Yazo) Eguchi of Kyushin Ryu Jujutsu

Foundation
- Founder: Inugami Sakon-no-shokan Nagakatsu
- Date founded: circa 1558
- Period founded: Eiroku
- Location founded: Hikone, Japan

Current information
- Current headmaster: Moti Ram
- Current headquarters: Brisbane, Australia

Arts taught
- Art: Description
- Jujitsu: Unarmed Self Defence
- Judo: Gentle Way
- Katsu: Resuscitation Techniques

Ancestor schools
- Enshin-ryū

Descendant schools
- Bartitsu, Judo

Kyūshin-ryū (扱心流, Kyūshin Ryū) is a form of the martial art Jujutsu consisting of striking, throwing and grappling techniques. It was developed by the Samurai in feudal Japan as a method of dispatching an armored (and often armed) opponent using unarmed techniques. According to the Densho (transmission scrolls) of various schools and historical records, these systems of unarmed combat began to be known as Jujutsu during the Muromachi period (1333–1568).

== Early history ==
During the Edo period (1603–1868) several Jujutsu styles became paramount. These schools (or ryu 流) focused their activities on various techniques that their masters had developed over time. The Kyushin Ryu school specialised in systems of Atemi waza (striking techniques). The art was practiced by many shōguns with the aim of refining methods of attacking the exposed target areas around the armour of their opponent.

Credit for the foundation of the Kyushin Ryu school is given to Inugami Sakon-no-shokan Nagakatsu (犬上永勝) during the Eiroku period (1558–1570). Nagakatsu was a Samurai from the Hikone area within the ancient kuni (or province) of Ōmi, a holding of the Ii clan. He worked as an Imperial Palace guard in nearby Kyoto.

After receiving reiken (霊剣 spirit sword) from his father Inugami Hyogonosuke (Heiko) Nagatsugu, he studied with Hayamizu Nagakado-no-kami Enshin, from whom he received menkyo in Kumiuchi (grappling with weapons). Enshin (also known as Hayami Naga Monmori Enshin) was a bodyguard (北面の武士 Hokumen-no-bushi) to Emperor Ōgimachi from 1557 to 1586 and densho of his teachings along with densho and kuden (spoken teachings) from Inugami's family eventually formed the art of Enshin Ryu.

Inukami District, just outside Hikone, Japan still bears the family name and contains one of the most famous shrines Taga-taisha, in the Shiga Prefecture.

Inugami went on to found his own ryu with a special focus on the core principles:

- Atemi waza – striking techniques
- Katsu waza (or Kappo) – methods of resuscitation and first aid

His son, Inugami Gunbei (Kyushinsai) Nagatomo developed the Kyushin Ryu curriculum further and established it in Kyūshū. Here, it became a highly regarded school and was known by a number of variant writings (of the first character, "kyu"). It contained techniques for grappling, swordsmanship, and other weaponry.

Inugami Gunbei Nagayasu (犬上永保), better known as Inugami Gunbei (grandson to Inugami Nagakatsu), attained great eminence in the art and developed it even further. So much so that he has also been deemed the originator of Kyushin Ryu. There is a great similarity between the principles of Kito Ryu and Kyushin Ryu and this has led to the suggestion that Kyushin Ryu had been derived (at least in part) from Kito Ryu. It is also said that in the second year of Kioho (1717) Inugami studied Kito Ryu under Takino which might also attribute to this similarity. Among those who were famous in Kyushin Ryu are; Ishino, Tsukamatyo and Eguchi.

Kyushin Ryu was also known as Inugami Ryu (after the founder) and the Bugei Ryuha Daijiten (武芸流派大事典) or "Encyclopedia of Martial Art Schools" lists a Densho "Kyushin Ichiryu Jujutsu" (扱心一流).

A man by the name of Takahashi was awarded mokuroku in Meiji 14 (1881), by a panel including Inugami (descendant of the founder), Ishino, Iwahashi and Kobayashi. Takahashi is believed to be the grandson of master Takahashiihyoei Mitsumasa (Takahashi Inobei), founder of Nanba Ippo Ryu.

A famous tale about Inugami Gunbei was published in "The Idler", London in October 1892:

One day Inugami Gunbei, a celebrated teacher of the Kyushin school, met Onogawa Kisaburō, the most famous wrestler of the time, in a teahouse. They drank sake together, and Onogawa began to brag, whereupon Inugami said that even a great wrestler might not be able to defeat an old man like himself. The angry wrestler proposed a trial of strength.

Onogawa took hold of Inugami saying, "Can you escape?" Inugami replied, "Of course, if you do not hold me more tightly."

So Onogawa grasped him more firmly, and repeated his question. He did this three times, and when Inugami said, "Can you do no more?" Onogawa, relaxing his grip to take a firmer hold, was in a moment pitched over upon his honourable back by Inugami. This he did twice. Onogawa was so much surprised that he became Inugami's pupil. Inugami also taught Onogawa how to overcome an enemy by falling down and tripping him up.

=== Lineage ===
- 犬上兵庫助永継 - Inugami Hyogonosuke Nagatsugu
- 犬上左近将監永勝 - Inugami Sakon no Shogun Nagakatsu
- 犬上扱心斎永友 - Inugami Kyushinsai Nagatomo
- 伊藤助兵衛勝 - Ito Sukebei Shigekatsu
- 伊藤四郎兵衛宗正 - Ito Shirobei Munemasa
- 棚橋五兵衛良貞 - Tanahashi Gobei Yoshisada
- 犬上郡兵永保 - Inugami Gunbei Nagayasu
  - 犬上郡兵衛永昌 - Inugami Gunbei Nagamasa
    - 江口吉太夫鎮俊 - Eguchi Kichidayu Shigetoshi
    - 犬上郡次郎 - Inugami Gunjiro
    - 石川雄兵衛良繁 - Ishikawa Yubei Yoshishige
      - 石川杢之助良量 - Ishikawa Mokinosuke Yoshiyuki
        - 安田六郎 - Yasuda Rokuro
  - 石野作左衛門長鑑 - Ishino Sakuzaemon Chokan
    - 岩橋清吉惟精 - Kiyoyoshi Iwahashi
      - 野田与市心重 - Noda Yoichi Shinju
        - 野田伝作心継 - Noda Densaku Shintsugu
          - 野田孫次郎心幸 - Noda Magojiro Shinko
            - 野田陣太郎 - Noda Jintaro

== Modern era ==
Dai Nippon Butokukai July 24, 1906 Kodokan Kata Syllabus working group - Shihan Eguchi pictured front row second from left (also pictured from Kyushin Ryu is Hidemi Tozuka - front row fourth from right - who went on to study Yoshin Ryu)

The most noteworthy master of Kyushin Ryu Jujutsu in more recent times is Shihan Yoshinori (Yazo) Eguchi (江口彌三) of Kumamoto Prefecture, who received recognition during the formative stages of modern Judo in the early 1880s (Meiji period 1868-1912). In 1895, Governor Watanabe of Kyoto Prefecture met with the masters of the prominent schools and established the Dai Nippon Butoku Kai (Greater Japan Martial Virtue Society). This was the first official Japanese martial arts institution authorised by the Ministry of Education and endorsed by the Meiji Emperor. It was here in 1906, that Dr Jigoro Kano (嘉納 治五郎 Kanō Jigorō, 1860–1938) founder of Judo, selected techniques from the more influential Jujutsu schools:

- Tenjin Shin'yō-ryū (stemming from Yoshin Ryu)
- Yoshin ryu
- Shiten ryu
- Sekiguchi Ryu
- Sosuishi Ryu
- Fusen Ryu
- Kito Ryu (unknown possibly having Chinese influence)
- Takenouchi Ryu
- Miura Ryu (Yoshin Ryu derived)
- Tsutsumi Hōzan-ryū
- Kyushin Ryu

Eguchi Shihan became one of Dr Kano's closest disciples during these early years and it was also at about this time that the Tokyo Metropolitan Police Department (founded in 1874) chose the techniques of Kyushin Ryu Jujutsu as part of their officer combat and defence training schedules.

Edward William Barton-Wright, founder of Bartitsu trained with Eguchi Shihan, although it is not known to what extent. Barton-Wright appears in many early photos with Eguchi Shihan and performed numerous public demonstrations with him and other martial arts exponents of the time. Ryōgorō Uchida, Chief of the Prefectural Police (also a student of Kyushin Ryu, under Ishikawa) held such events where jujutsu and judo were performed, along with weapons such as the naginata and katana.

Minehiko Nakano (b. 1912 d. 2000) of Yamaguchi Prefecture (山口県, Yamaguchi-ken) was Uchi-deshi (内弟子:うちでし) to Eguchi Shihan and received full transmission, including the secret techniques of Kyushin Ryu. In the Kodokan he was graded directly to nidan, reflecting his existing jujutsu credentials and a short time later was promoted directly to godan. This was extremely unorthodox as the Kodokan are noted for their strict adherence to tsukinami shiai (monthly tournaments) and you had to demonstrate a high level of skill in order to skip dan levels. Nakano was eventually promoted to hachidan (8th dan) in Kodokan Judo, being amongst the most proven and respected top-level players and instructors.

At the conclusion of World War 2, he resided in the city of Iwakuni (岩国市, Iwakuni-shi) near Hiroshima. This later became the site of a United States Marine Corps Air Base, where he was persuaded to interact with the Americans and teach them the art of Jujutsu.

== In Australia ==
One member of the Australian occupational forces was Mr Ray Stevens of Brisbane. He too, studied under Nakano, and brought the art to Brisbane, Queensland in the early 1950s. Here, he joined with Dr Arthur John (Jack) Ross to pass on his knowledge of Jujutsu to several well-known martial arts practitioners; John Lee Jones, Desmond de Vene, Jim Stackpoole and Joe Elkenhans to name but a few.

Ross, who founded the first Judo school in Australia (the Brisbane Judo Club) in 1928, went to Japan in 1901 aged 8. He was coached in Kodokan judo by EJ Harrison, and received his shodan grading before leaving for England to study medicine. Ross subsequently emigrated to Australia.

Shihan Jim Stackpoole, the previous head of Kyushin Ryu Jujitsu in Australia, also travelled to Japan to study under Minehiko Nakano. He was awarded shodan in 1968 after competing in the Yamaguchi Prefecture championships, and nidan in 1974 by Nakano Shihan. He has registered his school with the Australian government recognised Australian Jujitsu Federation Inc., and was a member of the Executive Council of that organisation. Apart from some adaptations to various techniques by other Jujutsu schools, the Kyushin Ryu School of Jujitsu is the only follower of the original Kyushin Ryu style in existence today. While the traditional techniques expounded by Eguchi Shihan have been retained, various aspects of the art have been influenced by the changing times, especially in relation to safety.

Shihan Jim passed away on the 4th of August 2022 after battling lymphoma, passing on the role of 'Head of School' to his wife Meladee Stackpoole.

On the 25th anniversary of the formation of the Australian School, Shihan Meladee stepped down. The role of "Head of School" was passed onto one the of school's first students, Moti Ram, who has also served on the School's Executive Committee.

NOTE: Jujutsu spelled "Jujitsu" is how the Australian line of the school has chosen to spell the art. There are other common romanizations of the art in the West, whereas the modern Hepburn romanization is "jūjutsu." Some of the other spellings used are Jiu-jitsu, Ju-Jitsu, Ju jitsu and so-on.

=== Lineage ===
1. 犬上兵庫助永継 - Inugami Hyogonosuke Nagatsugu
2. 犬上左近将監永勝 - Inugami Sakon no Shogun Nagakatsu
3. 犬上扱心斎永友 - Inugami Kyushinsai Nagatomo
4. 伊藤助兵衛勝 - Ito Sukebei Shigekatsu
5. 伊藤四郎兵衛宗正 - Ito Shirobei Munemasa
6. 棚橋五兵衛良貞 - Tanahashi Gobei Yoshisada
7. 犬上郡兵永保 - Inugami Gunbei Nagayasu (1701-1771)
8. 犬上郡兵衛永昌 - Inugami Gunbei Nagamasa (1761-1815)
9. 江口吉太夫鎮俊 - Eguchi Kichidayu Shigetoshi (1758-1811)
10. 江口源次郎秀種 - Eguchi Genjiro Hidetane (1775-1835)
11. 江口弥左衛門鎮誠 - Eguchi Yazaemon Chinsei (1810-1866)
12. 江口弥三 - Eguchi Yazo (1845-1924)
13. 中野三子彦 - Nakano Minehiko (1912-2000)
14. James Stackpoole (1947-2022)
15. Meladee Stackpoole (2022-2026)
16. Moti Ram (2026- Present)

== Worldwide ==
A school was established in London in the 1940s, however this was eventually disbanded. An association was set up in 1973 covering Kent, and later Sussex, thriving to this day. There are also other martial arts around the world using the same (or similar) Kyushin Ryu name. Some of these schools teach variants of karate, aiki-jutsu, aikido, kenjutsu, judo and even jujutsu but do not represent the original school founded by Nagakatsu.

One of the main reasons this has arisen is that the first two syllables 'kyu' and 'shin' can be written differently in Japanese to give alternate meanings. Furthermore, other schools that originated from, or have a link to the Japanese island of Kyūshū have been known to use Kyushin in the name.

== Meaning of the name ==
The name "Kyushin (Ichi) Ryu" may be broken into syllables:

- 扱 - Kyū - handle, treat
- 心 - Shin - heart, core, mind
- 一 - Ichi - (as prefix to Ryu, meaning first class, foremost)
- 流 - Ryū - flow, a style, method (school of thought)

Note: the no-longer used combination of "Ichi-Ryu" referred to the aristocratic class of society who practiced Kyushin Ryu Jujutsu, rather than implying the school was more "superior" than any other. The older members of Japanese aristocracy were attracted to the ease of application of the lethal Kyushin Ryu techniques. Many shōguns realised that Atemi waza would provide a quick result in their favour, without the extremely high levels of physical endurance required to apply other Jujutsu styles.

Thus Kyushin means to handle with the mind. Kyushin is not about handling the enemy's energy, but handling one's own energy freely when facing the enemy.

"Kyushin Ryu Jujitsu" may also be translated as Supreme level of Jujitsu. The word "supreme" refers to the class of the aristocracy, rather than a vain comparison with other Jujitsu styles. As the Shogun were regarded as within the highest level of Japanese society of the era, this is reflected in the choice of the star as the prominent feature of the emblem.

== Emblem ==
The Kyushin Ryu Jujitsu Emblem

The Kyushin Ryu Jujutsu emblem emanated from research conducted by Eguchi Shihan when, in the latter part of the 19th century, he endeavored to record many of the Jujutsu techniques practised within the Kyushin Ryu system. His study on the history of Kyushin Ryu focused on the formalisation and documentation of the school that took place during the Eiroku period (1558–1570), when five prominent Jujutsu schools pooled their knowledge to form the Kyushin Ryu system.

The five Jujutsu schools which pooled their knowledge over time were:

- Shindo Munen Ryu
- Kyushin Ryu
- Enshin Ryu
- Takenouchi Ryu
- Sekiguchi Ryu

Acknowledgement of the input from each school was symbolised by a five-pointed star. So that no school received more acknowledgment than the others, the star was drawn in such a manner that none of the five branches of the star actually formed a point. Each branch of the star has a curved appearance, reminiscent of the cherry blossom flower (or Sakura), revered in Japan.

The red circle in the middle depicts the red sun which is representative of Japan - the land of the rising sun.

The red colour of the star symbolises the reference to the "blood sport" of fights to the death, and the black outline reveres the "master level" belt attainable by Kyushin Ryu practitioners.

The shōguns were regarded amongst the highest levels of Japanese society during their time, and was reflected in the choice of a star as the prominent feature of the badge.
