= Sanshiro Sugata =

1943 Japanese film by Akira Kurosawa

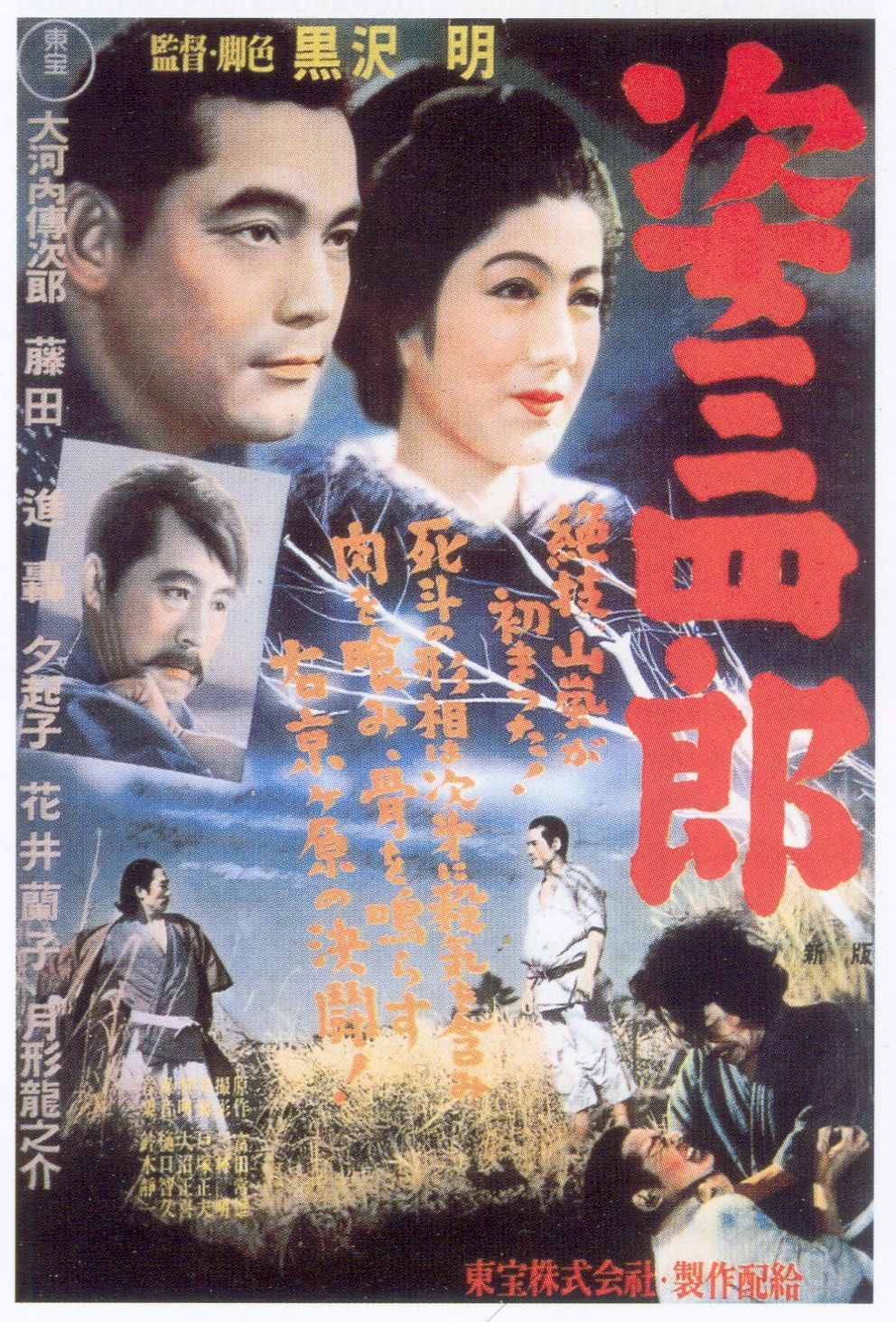
- Theatrical release poster
- Directed by: Akira Kurosawa
- Screenplay by: Akira Kurosawa
- Based on: Sanshiro Sugata by Tsuneo Tomita
- Produced by: Keiji Matsuzaki
- Starring: Denjirō Ōkōchi; Susumu Fujita; Yukiko Todoroki; Takashi Shimura
- Cinematography: Akira Mimura
- Edited by: Toshio Gotō
- Music by: Seiichi Suzuki
- Production company: Toho
- Distributed by: Toho
- Release date: March 25, 1943
- Running time: 97 minutes (original cut); 79 minutes (1943 cut); 91 minutes (2026 cut)
- Country: Japan
- Language: Japanese

Sanshiro Sugata (Japanese: 姿三四郎, Hepburn: Sugata Sanshirō; also known as Judo Saga) is a 1943 Japanese martial arts drama film written and directed by Akira Kurosawa, his feature directorial debut. It follows the story of the title character, played by Susumu Fujita, a talented though willful youth who learns discipline and martial prowess through his study of judo. The film is based on the 1942 novel by Tsuneo Tomita, which is a roman à clef of prominent judoka Shirō Saigō and the Kodokan–Totsuka rivalry.

The film is seen as an early example of Kurosawa's immediate grasp of the film-making process, and includes many of his directorial trademarks, such as the use of wipes, weather patterns as reflections of character moods, and use of slow motion.

First released in Japan on March 25, 1943, by Toho, it did not see a significant international release due to the ongoing Second World War. It was eventually released in the United States on April 28, 1974. It spawned a sequel, Sanshiro Sugata Part II, which was released in 1945 and was also directed by Kurosawa. The film itself was quite influential at the time, and has been remade on no fewer than five occasions.

== Plot ==
In 1882 Tokyo, Sanshiro Sugata is a talented though willful youth who wishes to become a jujutsu master by becoming a student at one of the city's martial arts schools. His first attempts to find a suitable instructor fail, until he finds an accomplished master, Shogoro Yano from the Shudokan Judo dojo, who he sees successfully defending himself against a group of jujutsu bullies near a river. Initially, Sanshiro is physically capable, but he lacks poise or reflection concerning his self-control and demeanor, even getting into fights at a village festival. His master believes him to be talented but lacking in discipline, describing teaching him judo as "like giving a knife to a madman". After being told about his lack of care about life, Sanshiro jumps into a lotus pond to prove his strength and loyalty. Clinging to a stake in the pond, he stays the whole day and night before he sees the opening of a lotus blossom and finds self-realization. Leaping out of the pond, he goes to Yano to ask for his forgiveness. He starts to appreciate that there is more to his life and to his art than simple muscle and brawl and soon becomes a leading student in his dojo.

The city is looking to employ one of the dojos to guide the training of its local police force, and the Shudokan becomes a leading candidate along with its rival, a Ryōi Shintō-ryū dojo led by Hansuke Murai. He first faces Saburo Monma, who had earlier tried to attack Shogoro by the river. The ensuing match leads to Monma's death, after a move by Sanshiro crashes him into a corner. In a scheduled competition between the two schools, Sanshiro is chosen to represent the Shudokan in a public match against Murai himself to determine which is best to train the local police in the martial arts. The scheduled bout gets off to a slow start, but Sanshiro soon comes into his own and begins executing devastating throws which cause internal physical damage to his opponent. Although Murai tries to stand every time, energized by the thought of his daughter Sayo, he is forced to give up after the third time he is violently sent to the ground by Sanshiro.

After the match, Sanshiro makes friends with his defeated opponent and is attracted to his daughter Sayo, who is a local beauty. Another Shintō-ryū master, Higaki, competes with Sanshiro for her affections. When he challenges Sanshiro to a duel to the death, Sanshiro accepts and defeats him, inflicting permanent crippling damage to Higaki. After emerging victorious from his duel, Sanshiro prepares for his next assignment in Yokohama and is escorted on the local train by Sayo. He promises to return to her after he finishes his journey.

== Cast ==
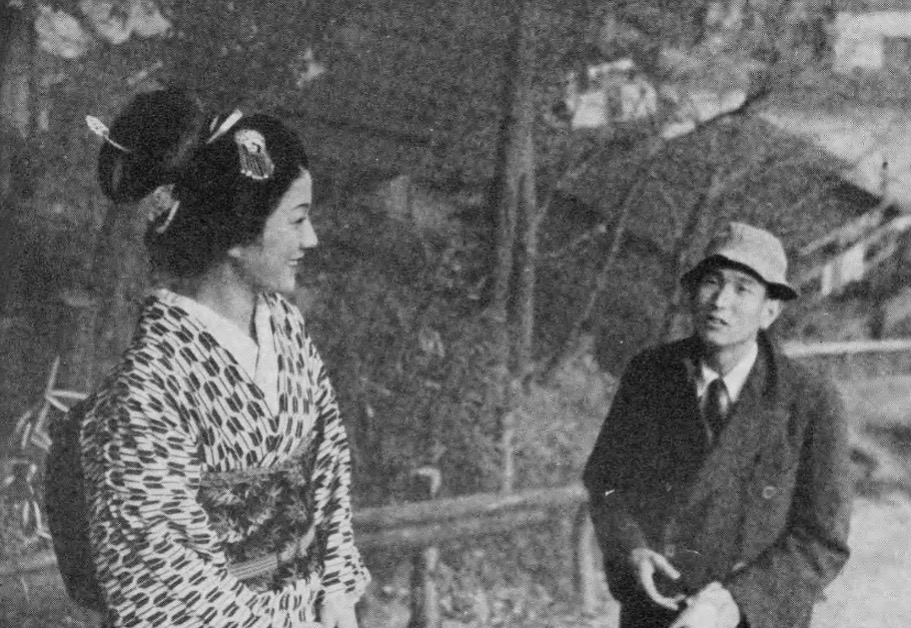
Yukiko Todoroki and Akira Kurosawa on set

- Susumu Fujita as Sanshiro Sugata
- Denjirō Ōkōchi as Shōgorō Yano
- Yukiko Todoroki as Sayo Murai
- Ryūnosuke Tsukigata as Gennosuke Higaki
- Takashi Shimura as Hansuke Murai
- Ranko Hanai as Osumi Kodana
- Sugisaku Aoyama as Tsunetami Iimura
- Ichiro Sugai as Police Chief Michitsune Mishima
- Yoshio Kosugi as Master Saburō Monma
- Kokuten Kōdō as Buddhist Priest
- Michisaburō Segawa as Wada
- Akitake Kōno as Yoshima Dan
- Shōji Kiyokawa as Yūjirō Toda
- Kunio Mita as Kōhei Tsuzaki
- Akira Nakamura as Toranosuki Niiseki
- Eisaburō Sakauchi as Nemeto
- Hajime Hikari as Torakichi

== Source material ==
The film is based on a 1942 novel of the same name written by Tsuneo Tomita. The author was the son of Tsunejirō Tomita, a prominent judoka and one of the so-called Kōdōkan Shitennō ("Four Heavenly Kings of the Kodokan") who were judo founder Jigorō Kanō's most loyal and skilled pupils. The novel is a roman à clef of the 1880s Kodokan–Totsuka rivalry, a notorious feud between Kano's judo and the Yōshin-ryū tradition of jujutsu.

Most of the principal characters are thinly-veiled references to real people; the titular Sugata is based on Kōdōkan Shitennō member Shirō Saigō, as well as Sanpo Toku. The namesake is another judoka named Setsuo Sugata. Sugata's master is called Shōgorō Yano and based on Jigorō Kanō, whose school is called the Shudokan in the novel and film. Sugata's rival-turned-ally Murai was based on Matsugoro Okuda. The antagonist Higaki is based on Mataemon Tanabe.

== Themes ==
The central theme of the film is the education and initiation of Sugata and the way in which, whilst learning the ways of Judo, he also learns about himself. The film's central scene concerning this theme is when, after being accosted by Yano for getting involved in a streetfight, Sugata leaps into the cold waters near Yano's temple and stays there in order to show his master his dedication, and the fact that he is neither afraid to live nor to die. However, the resident monk chides him for this self-serving display, and he emerges from the pond a humbler man after witnessing the blooming of a lotus blossom, a Buddhist symbol of purity.

Paul Anderer emphasized Kurosawa's attention to the character of Gennosuke Higaki in the film. Higaki, created by Tsuneo Tomita for the novel and inspired by real life jujutsu master Mataemon Tanabe, is the film's central villain. Anderer stated:

Kurosawa would later call Higaki his Mephistopheles and insist that he is the most interesting character in this film. Given the heightened drama of every scene he invades, the visual association between him and the shadow, as well as the sound of his voice—cued as it is to the raging wind—Higaki does spur Kurosawa to deviate from the path of a conventional wartime 'spiritist' film. The director's focus shifts away; from a wholesome story of a guileless youth, perfecting his skill along with his pure Japanese heart. He stays strangely fixed on Higaki and conveys an unmistakable sympathy for the devil, no matter the moral consequence.

== Production ==
Following five years of second unit director work on films such as Uma and Roppa's Honeymoon, Akira Kurosawa was finally given the go-ahead to direct his first film, even though he himself claimed that, in films like Uma, "I had been so much in charge of production I had felt like the director". After hearing of a new novel from the writer Tomita Tsuneo in an advertisement, Kurosawa decided the project was for him and asked film producer Iwao Mori to buy the rights for him. Kurosawa, having been told that Toho would not be able to buy the rights until it was published, eagerly awaited its release, to the point where he stalked bookstores night and day until he found a copy; he quickly read the book and wrote a screenplay for it. Despite his enthusiasm, Masahiro Makino was first asked to direct, but he declined.

According to Japanese cinema scholar Donald Richie, the reason Kurosawa was allowed to direct the film was because he had had two film scripts printed, including one of which had won the education minister's prize. However, his work was too far away from the government requirements for a wartime film. Tomita's novel, on the other hand, was considered "safe", dealing, as it did, with a Japanese subject such as the martial rivalry between judo and jujitsu; being a period piece; and having a popular subject. Kurosawa deliberately went out to make a "movie-like movie", as he knew he would not be able to insert any particularly didactic qualities in the film.

=== Censorship and alternative versions ===
When he went to the board of censors (which he likened to being on trial), the film passed on the basis of recommendation by Yasujiro Ozu, who called it an important artistic achievement despite other voices claiming it was too "British-American". After the initial release, Japanese censors reportedly trimmed the film by 17 minutes. Some of this footage was later recovered and added to a DVD release, (Note: The deleted scenes are: Priest Visits Sanshiro; Mr Higaki and Miss Sayo; Saburo's Daughter; Mr Higaki and Master Murai; Sanshiro Has a Visitor) and the original script with the missing material still exists; intertitles are included in the release that describe what occurred in the missing parts. The 1952 re-release (from which the 2009 Criterion DVD is made) opens with (translated from the original Japanese text):

This film has been modified from the original version of Akira Kurosawa's debut film, which opened in 1943, without consulting the director or the production staff. 1,845 feet of footage was cut in 1944 to comply with the government's wartime entertainment policies. As much as we'd like to show the original version, we were not able to locate the cut footage. Yet we strongly believe this modified version is worthy of re-release. We thank you for understanding the circumstances surrounding the re-release of this film. April 1952, Toho Company Ltd.

=== Restoration ===
In 2026, eight decades after its original release, a 4K restoration led by Toho using the existing 35mm master positive print and 35mm duplicate negative, was able to restore 12-minutes from the original cut. The new cut will have its premiere at the Cannes Classics section of the 2026 Cannes Film Festival, followed by theatrical re-releases in Japan and France.

== Subsequent media ==
=== Sequel ===
A sequel film, Sanshiro Sugata Part II, was released in 1945. Akira Kurosawa wrote and directed, and most of the principal cast reprised their roles. The film was intended primarily as propaganda for the Second World War, and features Sanshiro facing off against villainous American and European fighters.

=== Film remakes ===
Sanshiro Sugata has been remade five times since it was initially released, although these versions are even harder to find in the west than the original. The 1955 and 1965 versions share the script of the original versions, whereas the subsequent three releases are all based on the novel rather than Kurosawa's screenplay.

- Sugata Sanshirō (1955) – Directed by Shigeo Tanaka
- Sugata Sanshirō (1965) – Directed by Seiichirō Uchikawa, starring Yūzō Kayama and Takashi Shimura (as a different character).
- Ninkyō Yawara Ichidai (1966) – Directed by Sadao Nakajima
- Sugata Sanshirō (released in the Philippines as The Master; 1970) – Directed by Kunio Watanabe, starring Muga Takewaki.
- Sugata Sanshirō (1977) – Directed by Kihachi Okamoto, starring Tomokazu Miura and Tatsuya Nakadai.

=== Television ===
- Sugata Sanshirō (1970) was aired on NTV, starring Muga Takewaki.
- Sugata Sanshirō (1978-79) was aired on NTV, starring Hiroshi Katsuno and Masaya Oki.
- Sugata Sanshirō (2007) was aired on TV Tokyo, starring Shigeaki Kato.

=== Home video ===
The Criterion Collection has released Sanshiro Sugata on DVD in North America as part of two Kurosawa-centered box sets; 2009's AK 100: 25 Films by Akira Kurosawa, and 2010's The First Films of Akira Kurosawa, the 23rd entry in their Eclipse series.

== In popular culture ==
Segata Sanshiro, an advertising character created by Sega to advertise the Sega Saturn video game console, is a parody of Sanshiro Sugata.

== See also ==
- List of incomplete or partially lost films
