= Hikosuke Totsuka =

Japanese martial artist

- Born: 1813; Edo, Japan
- Died: April 15, 1886 (aged 72–73); Chiba, Japan
- Native name: 戸塚 彦介
- Nationality: Japanese
- Style: Yoshin-ryū
- Teacher: Hidetsuka Totsuka

Other information
- Children: Hidemi Totsuka

Hikosuke Totsuka (戸塚 彦介, Totsuka Hikosuke; 1813–1886) was a Japanese jujutsu master of the Yoshin-ryū school. Under his leadership, the Totsuka-ha Yoshin-ryū was the largest jujutsu organization in Japan, as well as the last great school of this art, until the rise of Kodokan judo. He was reported to be one of the strongest martial artists of his era.

== Biography ==
He was the elder son of Hidetsuka Totsuka, the founder of the Totsuka branch of Yoshin-ryū jujutsu. While he was learning the family art, Hikosuke served the feudal Numazu Domain in Suruga Province from 1830 until 1837, in which he inherited leadership of the Totsuka family. In 1860, his prestige in the teaching of jujutsu carried to him to an audience with Shogun Tokugawa Iemochi, whom Totsuka showed his style by performing kata in his presence. Iemochi was impressed, so Totsuka started working for the Tokugawa Shogunate as a jujutsu teacher at the Kobusho academy in Tokyo.

Around this time, he had contact with future Shinsengumi member Shinohara Yasunoshin, who stayed at Totsuka's house and discussed martial principles with him.

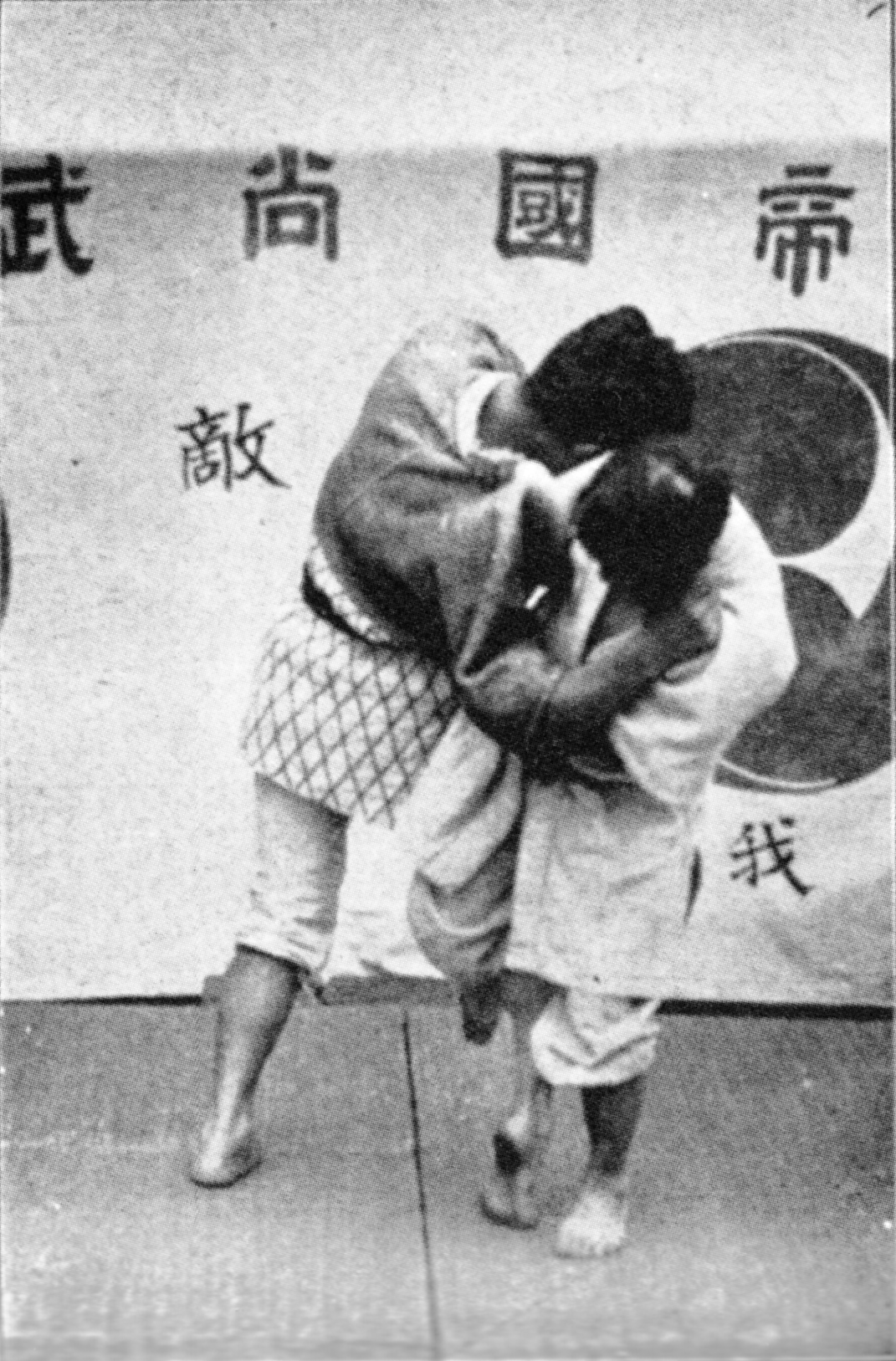
Kama goshi demonstrated by lineage member Konokichi Fukai.

At 178cm and 86kg, Totsuka was large and imposing for a Japanese man at the time, as well as highly skilled. In 1854, he defeated Shibukawa-ryu master Tetsutaro Hisatomi, who went to become his disciple on the claim he knew no better man at tachi-waza than Totsuka. His training regimes were similarly brutal, with trainees being routinely injured and even dying in the Kobusho. One of his favorite techniques was a move similar to osoto gari he called kama goshi.

In 1861, Totsuka departed from the Kobusho due to political changes and decided to settle by himself, opening the first of a system of Totsuka-ha dojos in Atago, Edo. By this point, he hand over 1.600 students. Totsuka later moved his residence to Chiba after the 1868 Meiji Restoration. He worked as the main hand-to-hand teacher of the Chiba Police Department, but also taught several great exponents of his art, like Matashiro Kashiwazaki, Jujiro Aizawa, Taro Terushima and Teisuke Nishimura.

In 1885, Totsuka sparred against another renowned fighter, Tenjin Shin'yō-ryū master Katsunosuke Masuoka, and defeated him twice despite being 23 years older and the same weight. Again, Masuoka become his disciple.

In the mid-1880s, his Tokyo students became entangled with the rising Kodokan judo school during the Kodokan-Totsuka rivalry, but Totsuka himself would not see its end, dying of an illness in 1886 in midst of the confrontations. He was succeeded by his adopted son Hidemi, who later joined Kodokan founder Jigoro Kano to form the jujutsu department of Dai Nippon Butoku Kai.
