= Morikichi Otake =

Japanese martial artist

- Born: 1855; Numazu, Numazu Domain, Japan
- Died: June 6, 1930 (aged 74–75); Chiba, Japan
- Native name: 奥田松五郎
- Nationality: Japanese
- Style: Tenjin Shin'yō-ryū; Totsuka-ha Yoshin-ryu
- Teachers: Hikosuke Totsuka; Matashiro Kashiwazaki

Morikichi Otake (大竹森吉, Otake Morikichi; 1855–1930) was a Japanese martial artist. A master of Tenjin Shin'yō-ryū and Totsuka-ha Yoshin-ryu, he was an early opponent to Jigoro Kano.

== Biography ==
He was the son of samurai Gihachi Otake from Numazu Domain. He started training in the Totsuka-ha Yoshin-ryu style under Matashiro Kashiwazaki, an apprentice to Hikosuke Totsuka, and eventually became a student of Totsuka himself. In 1884 Otake, Matsugoro Okuda and Daihachi Ichikawa challenged Jigoro Kano and his new Kodokan school in Tokyo, which Kano's apprentice Shiro Saigo took up. Okuda and Saigo fought, with Saigo winning.

In 1886 he moved to Tokyo, where he opened his first jujutsu and kenjutsu school and became a hand-to-hand instructor for the Tokyo Metropolitan Police Department. Two years later, he also started teaching Suiko-ryu suijutsu. In 1893 he finished his tenure in the Metropolitan Police and branched off to Chiba four years later, moving back and forth to teach until eventually establishing in Chiba. He participated in at least one tournament in front of Emperor Meiji and Empress Shoken, and came to teach around 10,000 disciples. One of them was Konokichi Fukai, who codified his style of Yoshin-ryu in his own works. He died in June 1930.
