= Koshiki-no-kata =

Martial arts forms/techniques

Koshiki no Kata
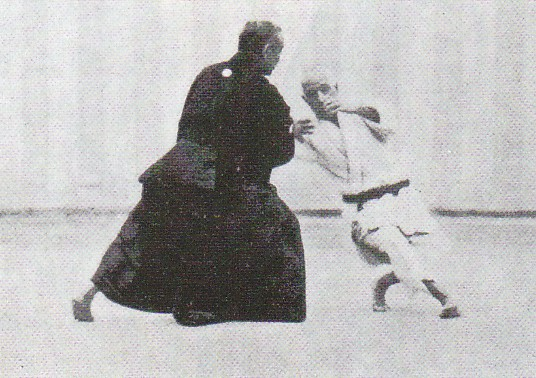
- Kanō and Yamashita performing Koshiki-no-kata
- Classification: Kata
- Sub classification: Kodokan kata
- Kodokan: Yes

Technique name
- Rōmaji: Koshiki-no-kata
- Japanese: 古式の形
- English: Ancient Forms

Koshiki no Kata (古式の形, Koshiki-no-kata; Form of the antique things) is a kata (a set of prearranged techniques) in Judo. It is also known as Kito-ryu no Kata (起倒流の形). It consists of 21 techniques originally belonging to the Takenaka-ha Kito School of jujutsu. Jigoro Kano revised the techniques and incorporated them into a kata in order to preserve the historical source of judo. The set of forms is antique and were intended for "Kumiuchi", the grappling of armored warriors in the feudal ages. As such, the kata is to be performed with both partners imagining that they are clad in armor. The Koshiki-no-kata, together with Nage-no-kata, Katame-no-kata, Ju-no-kata, Kime-no-kata and Goshin-Jitsu, is recognised by the International Judo Federation (IJF.) Although koshiki-no-kata is not often seen in the United States, it is still taught and practiced in Japan. Some striking demonstrations of it from the 1950s can be seen in the film "Classic Judo Kata," by Harold Sharp. If the description of the kata in that film is correct, it would be the only judo kata that involves attacking the cervical spine.

== Techniques ==
- Omote (表, Front)
  1. Tai (体, Ready Posture)
  2. Yume-no-uchi (夢中, Dreaming)
  3. Ryokuhi (力避, Strength Dodging)
  4. Mizu-guruma (水車, Water Wheel)
  5. Mizu-nagare (水流, Water Flow)
  6. Hiki-otoshi (曳落, Draw Drop)
  7. Ko-daore (虚倒, Log Fall)
  8. Uchikudaki (打砕, Smashing)
  9. Tani-otoshi (谷落, Valley Drop)
  10. Kuruma-daore (車倒, Wheel Throw)
  11. Shikoro-dori (錣取, Grabbing the Neckplates)
  12. Shikoro-gaeshi (錣返, Twisting the Neckplates)
  13. Yudachi (夕立, Shower)
  14. Taki-otoshi (滝落, Waterfall Drop)
- Ura (裏, back)
  1. Mi-kudaki (身砕, Body Smashing)
  2. Kuruma-gaeshi (車返, Wheel Throw)
  3. Mizu-iri (水入, Water Plunge)
  4. Ryusetsu (柳雪, Willow Snow)
  5. Sakaotoshi (坂落, Headlong Fall)
  6. Yukiore (雪折, Snowbreak)
  7. Iwa-nami (岩波, Wave on the Rocks)

== Video of Koshiki-no-kata ==
- "Koshiki no kata performed by M° Yamashita" on YouTube
- "Jigoro Kano Kito Ryu no Kata koshiki omote full version" on YouTube
