= Shinohara Tainoshin =

Japanese samurai (1828–1911)

Shinohara Tainoshin (篠原 泰之進, December 22, 1828 – June 13, 1911) was a Japanese samurai from Chikugo Province who lived during the late Tokugawa shogunate. He sided with Satsuma in the Battle of Toba–Fushimi. After the Meiji Restoration, Shinohara became a businessman and later, a devout Christian.

In his memoir, Shinohara describes pivotal events and circumstances surrounding the Shinsengumi, Aburakōji Incident and his own assassination attempt on Kondō Isami.
