= Yama arashi =

Judo technique

Yama Arashi
- Classification: Nage-waza
- Sub classification: Te-waza
- Kodokan: Yes

Technique name
- Rōmaji: Yama Arashi
- Japanese: 山嵐
- English: Mountain storm

Yama Arashi (山嵐; "mountain storm") is one of the preserved throwing techniques, Habukareta Waza, of Judo. It belonged to the fifth group, Dai Gokyo, of the 1895 Gokyo no Waza lists. It is categorized as a hand throwing technique, Te-waza. It rarely occurs in competition or randori.

Yama Arashi is also one of Danzan Ryu's twenty throwing techniques of the Nagete list.

== Technique description ==
Danzan Ryu's version looks more like Osoto Gari, whereas in Judo, it almost looks like a thigh sweeping throw. Since it is categorized as a hand technique, the technique must have been thought of being primarily executed by tori's arms.

== Included systems ==
Systems:

- Kodokan Judo, List of Kodokan Judo techniques
- Danzan Ryu, Lists of Danzan Ryu
- Yama Arashi Goshin Jitsu

Lists:

- The Canon Of Judo
- Judo technique

== Similar techniques, variants, and aliases ==
English Alias: Mountain Storm

Similar techniques:

- Harai Goshi: Difference lies in the action of the leg in Harai Goshi
- O guruma
