= Dojoyaburi =

Concept in Japanese martial arts

In the history of Japanese martial arts, dojoyaburi (道場破り, doujouyaburi; lit. "dojo breaking"), also known as dojoarashi (道場荒らし, doujouarashi; lit. "dojo devastation") or as "dojo storming" in English, is the action of visiting a rival martial arts school in order to challenge its members. This usually led to taryūjiai (他流試合, taryuujiai; lit. "other style match"), a fight between the visitor and a member of the school, usually its head or a fighter chosen for the challenge, where the superiority of their respective fighting styles would be tested. The losing side would also lose its martial prestige and in many cases, its apprentices would abandon it for the winner's school. The one who ends victorious in the stand-off receives its rival's battle awards.

== History ==
Since ancient times, dojoyaburi was an established way for Japanese martial arts organizations to gain popularity and students. It was practiced by schools of kenjutsu, jujutsu, and other styles and it was sometimes associated with musha shugyo and the samurai lifestyle. Its usage fell with the prohibition of taryujiai, which limited martial arts competitions to the bounds of every school, but it blossomed again when the ban was lifted during the Edo period.

Modern examples exist as well. In the 19th century, the Kodokan school of judo was particularly known for its intense dojoyaburi activity, caused by the opposition of other jujutsu styles. During the 1950s, karate master Teruo Hayashi also was infamous for performing dojoyaburi among the schools of Okinawa. The custom gained controversy in 1970 when a man died in a dojo storm performed by Count Dante and his students on the rival Green Dragon Society's Black Cobra Hall. Dante was ultimately acquitted.

A practice similar to dojoyaburi happened in professional wrestling, where legitimate grapplers like Yoshiaki Fujiwara became famous for engaging and defeating martial artists that came to challenge his promotion. The history of vale tudo and mixed martial arts also contained several instances of dojo storms, most notoriously those performed by the Gracie family as part of their promotional story for Brazilian jiu-jitsu, which led to the creation of Ultimate Fighting Championship.

== See also ==
- Gracie Challenge
- Kodokan-Totsuka rivalry
