= Harai makikomi =

Judo technique

- Classification: Nage-waza
- Sub classification: Sutemi-waza
- Kodokan: Yes

Technique name
- Rōmaji: Harai makikomi
- Japanese: 払巻込
- English: Hip sweep wraparound

Harai Makikomi (払巻込) is a Yoko-sutemi (橫捨身技): side sacrifice throw in Judo. It is one of the techniques adopted later by the Kodokan into their Shinmeisho No Waza (newly accepted techniques) list. It is categorized as a side sacrifice technique, Yoko-sutemi.

== See also ==
- The Canon Of Judo
