= Ryōi Shintō-ryū =

School of Jūjutsu

- Ko-ryū

Foundation
- Founder: Fukuno Shichirouemon Masakatsu
- Period founded: c.1600

Current information
- Current headmaster: Mifune Toichiro

Arts taught
- Art: Description
- Jujutsu: Hybrid art, unarmed or with minor weapons

Ancestor schools
- Sumo, Hoshu no Jutsu, Yagyū Shinkage-ryū

Descendant schools
- Ryōi Shintō Kasahara-ryū, Jikishin-ryū, Ise Jitoku Tenshin-ryū/Jigō Tenshin-ryū, Kitō-ryū, Fusen-ryū, Judo

Ryōi Shintō-ryū Jūjutsu 良移心当流 柔術, (also known as Fukuno-ryū 福野流, Shintō Yawara 神当和, or Ryōi Shintō-ryū Yawara 良移心當流和) is a traditional school (Koryū 古流, old style) of Jujutsu (柔術), founded in the early 17th century by Fukuno Shichirouemon Masakatsu (福野七郎右衛門正勝).

== Etymology ==
The 'Ryōi Shintō-ryū Denju Mokuroko' (良移心当流 伝授 目録) explains the meaning of Ryōi Shintō as follows: "The meaning of Ryōi Shintō-ryū is to shift (i 移) your heart (shin 心) well (ryō 良), then you will encounter (tō 当) harmony (wa 和, or yawara, an alternative term for jūjutsu)." Alternatively, the 'Ryōi Shintō-ryū Ryakushi' records Fukuno as saying that: "Ryōi Shintō means to: skillfully apply the mind (shin 心) and strike (tō 当) with ease."

== History ==
Ryōi Shintō-ryū is one of a web of schools that can be traced back to Fukuno-Ryū (福野流), and its founder, Fukuno Shichirouemon Masakatsu. Fukuno-Ryū (福野流), along with Takenouchi-ryū (竹内流) and Yōshin-ryū (楊心流) make up the three primary lineages of Jūjutsu in the Edo period (江戸時代 Edo jidai 1603–1868) before the rise of Judo.

It's related styles include: the Kitō-ryū Jūjutsu (起倒流柔術), from which Kōdōkan Jūdō (講道館 柔道) can be seen as being partially descended; Jikishin-ryū yawara (直心流柔) and Ise Jitoku Tenshin-ryū Jūjutsu (為勢自得天眞流柔術) also known as Jigō Tenshin-ryū Jūjutsu (自剛天真流 柔術).

The 'Jigō Tenshin-ryū densho' (自剛天真流 伝書) states that: "For grappling on the battlefield, Ryōi Shintō-ryū is unequalled."

=== Fukuno Shichirouemon Masakatsu ===
Fukuno was born (approx.) 1585 in Settsu, Naniwa (the modern-day area of Osaka, Japan) and known as in his youth as 'Yuzen'. He studied with Yagyū Munetoshi (柳生石舟斎平宗厳 1529 – May 25, 1606) of the Yagyū Shinkage-ryū (柳生新陰流) of Kenjutsu (剣術). Fukuno was a Meishu (名手 – master) of Sumo (相撲) and a Tatsujin (達人 – master expert) of the Yagyū Shinkage-ryū.

The 'Jujutsu Hottan – Fukuno Shichirouemon den' states that Fukuno:

"... was an intrepid character, with great strength, he lifted mighty bronze pots. He took pleasure in learning the techniques of Nomi no Sukune (野見 宿禰). Fukuno endured mental tortures and developed his physique, and after twenty years or so, he finally acquired mastery of Nomi no Sukune's techniques. People spoke of him admiringly. He fights with great strength and battles with great valour. With his technique, he defeats an opponent in barely a minute, or two. His determination is to fight to the death. His techniques are correct, who could deny him victory." [source?]

=== Meiji period ===
Later, in the ‘Meiji period’ (1868–1912), Ryōi Shintō-ryū Jūjutsuka – Hansuke Nakamura (中村半助) was considered the toughest martial artist in Japan. In 1886, Nakamura fought a match against the famed Kōdōkan Judo (講道館 柔道) champion Yokoyama Sakujiro (横山 作次郎), known as ‘Demon’ Yokoyama (鬼横山). Both men fought for 55 minutes, but as neither prevail the match was drawn. Nakamura was declared champion of East of Japan and Yokoyama champion of the West.

=== In contemporary Japan ===
As with many koryū jūjutsu styles, the main sōke (宗家) line of the Ryōi Shintō-ryū in Japan is now lost.

The only related school currently taught in Japan is Ise Jitoku Tenshin-ryū Jūjutsu (為勢自得天眞流柔術), which is a derivative of the Ryōi Shintō-ryū (良移心當流)that was combined with techniques from Yōshin-ryū Jūjutsu (楊心流柔術). Ise Jitoku Tenshin-ryū (aka Jigō Tenshin-ryū 自剛天真流) was founded by Fujita Chosuke Roku Norisada (藤田長助麓憲貞) (died 1844) and is under the leadership of 16th generation sōke (宗家) Mifune Toichiro.
