= Atemi =

Japanese striking techniques

Japanese name
- Kanji: 当身
- Hiragana: あてみ
Transcriptions
- Revised Hepburn: atemi

In Japanese martial arts, the term atemi (当身) designates blows or strikes to the body, as opposed to twisting of joints, strangleholds, holding techniques and throws. Atemi can be delivered by any part of the body to any part of the opponent's body. They can be percussive or use "soft" power. Karate is a typical martial art focusing on percussive atemi. The location of nerve and pressure points, such as might be used for certain acupressure methods, also often informs the choice of targets for atemi (see kyusho).

Some strikes against vital parts of the body can kill or incapacitate the opponent: on the solar plexus, at the temple, under the nose, in the eyes, genitals, or under the chin. Traditional Japanese martial arts (the ancestors of judo, jujutsu, and aikido) do not commonly practice atemi, since they were supposed to be used on the battlefield against armoured opponents. However, there are certain exceptions.

Atemi can be complete techniques in and of themselves, but are also often used to briefly break an opponent's balance (see kuzushi) or resolve. This is the predominant usage of atemi in aikido. A painful but non-fatal blow to an area such as the eyes, face, or some vulnerable part of the abdomen can open the way for a more damaging technique, such as a throw or joint lock. Even if the blow does not land, the opponent can be distracted, and may instinctively contort their body (e.g., jerking their head back from a face strike) in such a way that they lose their balance.

The development of atemi techniques arises from the evolution of the Japanese martial arts, in particular jujutsu. Early styles of jujutsu from Sengoku-era Japan were created as a means of unarmed combat for a samurai who had lost his weapons on the battlefield. The purpose of jujutsu was to disarm the opponent and use their own weapon against them. As such, strikes to the body were limited as the intended victim would have been wearing extensive body armour. However, in later styles of jujutsu from Edo-period Japan empty-handed strikes to the body became more common as full-scale military engagement began to decline. This meant that the jujutsu practitioner's opponent would not have been wearing armour and the vital points that form the crux of atemi-waza were more exposed.

== Atemi waza in original judo ==
Kodokan judo as designed by Jigoro Kano also contained atemi waza (当て身技) or body-striking techniques from the several jujitsu styles that inspired Kano, which, however, were excluded from its sports competition repertoire, which limits itself to throws (nage waza) and holds (kansetsu waza). Although taught within self-defense, kata and sometimes used within informal randori, striking techniques are forbidden in the sport judo competitions rules.

== See also ==
- Pressure points
- Acupressure
- Hapkido
