= Dai Nippon Butoku Kai =

Martial arts organization with ties to the Japanese government

Dai Nippon Butoku Kai 大日本武徳会
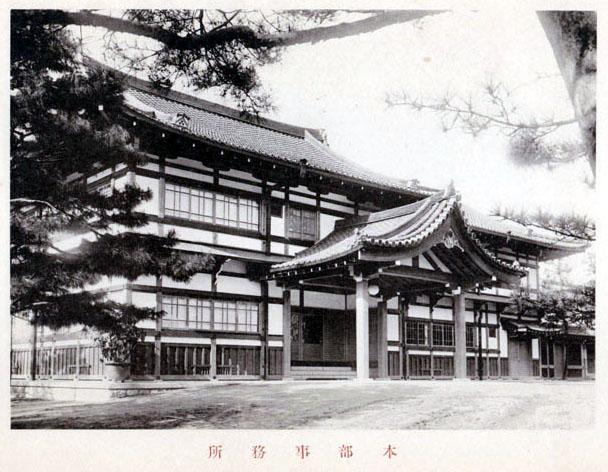
- Founded: April 17, 1895 (Meiji 28)
- Type: Sports organization

Dai Nippon Butoku Kai (DNBK, Japanese: 大日本武徳会, English: "Greater Japan Martial Virtue Society") was the largest martial arts organization in Japan before World War II, originally established in 1895 in Kyoto. It had a predominant biggest influence on Budo in modern Japan.

The first president was Imperial Prince Komatsunomiya Akihito and the first chairman was Chairman Watanabe Chiaki (Governor of Kyoto). At the end of World War II, the DNBK changed its status from a public to a private organization. Enrollment fell significantly from millions to hundreds and it lost its authority to govern all martial arts organizations in Japan. In 1946, due to its association with the Japanese Military during wartime, the GHQ dissolved the DNBK. The following years, more than 1,300 leaders and officials of the DNBK were purged—ostracized, lost their jobs, and were forbidden to take any government position. In 1953, the new DNBK was established with a new philosophical vision of preserving the long-standing illustrious classical martial virtues and traditions.

== History ==
=== Establishment of the original military school ===
The original Dai Nippon Butoku Kai facility was created as a private organization in 1895 in Kyoto. In 1919, Hiromichi Mishikubo (vice-president of DNBK) made the term change from Bujutsu to Budo. In the eyes of Mishikubo the term bujutsu seemed heavily concerned with physical technique and insisted in using Budo as a mental discipline and as it was representative of the term Bushido. All -jutsu termed arts transitioned to become -Do and thus became standard terms at the Butokukai.

In 1921, the DNBK executive committee decided to make kendo, Judo and Kyudo the main Budo disciplines. Kendo and Judo grading system was established in 1895 and kyudo in 1923. By the 1930s a systematic appropriation of martial arts by the state was underway, fueled in the successful wake of the Russo-Japanese War, sped up even more in 1942–1945 during the apex of Japan's "militarisation" (sengika). This led to a number of "unprecedented policies aimed at making martial arts education combat effective and ideologically aligned with ultra-nationalistic government policy" were set into motion. This strove to corral any and all budo organizations under state control to which the proposal of the "National Physical Strength Deliberation Council" sponsored by the Ministry of Health and Welfare recommended that an "all-encompassing extra-governmental organization" formed between the five ministries of Kōseishō (Health and Welfare), Mombushō (Education), Rikugunshō (Army), Kaigunshō (Navy) and the Naimushō (Home) which promoted budō in schools, community organizations and groups. This was an effective way to expand the reach and breadth of the propaganda being issued by the ultra nationalistic government into the community, plus allowing a clear path to community indoctrination through budō programs; especially notable was the efforts targeting children and schools that is apparent by the amount of funding it received, allocated by a national budget at the time.

The response was as follows: "We have reached a consensus to restructure the Dai-Nippon Butokukai, a registered society that has contributed to the advancement of budō for many years, and incorporate it into the organs of government." This allowed public funding to be spent on a larger project nationally.

After the end of World War II, the Supreme Commander of Allied Powers (General Douglas MacArthur) issued a directive to dissolve any and all military-related or nationalistic propaganda organizations. The disbanding was done under the "Removal and Exclusion of Undesirable Personnel from Public Office", which issued a purge directive contained in SCAPIN9 548 (Removal of Ultranationalists) clearly stating: "ultra-nationalistic or militaristic social, political, professional and commercial societies and institutions will be dissolved and prohibited".

This was accompanied by SCAPIN 550 (Removal and Exclusion of Undesirable Personnel from Public Office) which states: "Persons who have been active exponents of militarism and militant nationalism will be removed and excluded from public office and from any positions of public or substantial private responsibility."

In a memorandum proposed to the Chief of Staff, it also stated: "Dissolution of Dai Nippon Butokukai by order to the Imperial Japanese Government is recommended in accordance with the provisions of SCAPIN 548 Paragraph I-f on the grounds that this is an organization 'affording military or quasi-military training' and which provides for the 'perpetuation of militarism' or a martial spirit in Japan."

== Reestablishment ==
Japan regained its sovereignty in 1951 after the signing of the San Francisco peace treaty. In 1953, the new Dai Nippon Butoku Kai was established to revive the pre-WWII DNBK with the philosophical vision of preserving the long-standing classical martial virtues and traditions. The DNBK aims for the restoration of classical martial cultures, supporting allied research, instruction and service, promotion of international peace and harmony, and the advancement of greater humanity through Budo education.

In 1974, DNBK officially established the International Division overseeing all international members. In 2022, DNBK has official representatives and coordinators in Canada, United Kingdom, Italy, Belgium, Portugal, Israel, Hungary, Russia, Germany, Spain, Malta, France and California US, Hawaii US, Mid-Western US, Boston US, Arizona US, Florida US, Australia, Romania, Switzerland, Armenia, Chile, Switzerland, Greece, Gibraltar, Austria, Latvia and Nepal. In April 2023 the DBNK celebrated its 128th anniversary at the butokuden in Kyoto.
