= Kitō-ryū =

Traditional school (koryū) of jujutsu

Kitō-ryū (起倒流)
- Date founded: Early Edo period, 17th century
- Country of origin: Japan
- Founder: Fukuno Schichiroemon and Terada
- Current head: Exist In Japan And Indonesia
- Arts taught: Jujutsu
- Ancestor arts: Japanese Jujutsu styles, including Ryōi Shintō-ryū
- Descendant arts: Takenaka-ha Kitō-ryū, Fusen-ryū, Judo

Kitō-ryū (起倒流) is a traditional school (koryū) of the Japanese martial art of jujutsu. Its syllabus comprises atemi-waza (striking techniques), nage-waza (throwing techniques), kansetsu-waza (joint locking techniques) and shime-waza (choking techniques). The style is focused on throws and sweeps, and many of these techniques are designed to be performed while in full armor.

== Origin ==
Kitō-ryū is translated as "the school of the rise and fall." It was founded by Fukuno Schichiroemon. Fukuno was a retired samurai who once trained in the school of Shaolin fighter Chin Genpin before opening up a new school to teach his new art of Kitō-ryū. It is similar to forms of "Aikijutsu," including the principle of "ki" (energy) and aiki (Kitō Ryū teaches that "When two minds are united, the stronger controls the weaker"...). Equally, it uses principles such as "kuzushi no ri" or "breaking of balance" now associated with modern judo.

== Base art of Judo ==
Jigoro Kano trained in Kitō-ryū and derived some of the principles that were to form the basis of modern judo from this style. Judo's Koshiki-no-kata is based on Kitō-ryū. Since Kano Jigoro got the Kitō-ryū densho from his Sensei, Judo is the current Kitō-ryū official successor. Modified safer versions of Kitō-ryū throws form large part of Judo's Nagewaza (but without joint-locking throws).
