= Tenjin Shin'yō-ryū =

Traditional school of jūjutsu

Tenjin Shin'yō-ryū (天神真楊流)
- Ko-ryū

Foundation
- Founder: Iso Mataemon Ryūkansai Minamoto no Masatari
- Date founded: 1830s
- Period founded: Late Edo period (1603–1867)

Current information
- Current headmaster: Kubota Toshihiro and Shibata Koichi

Arts taught
- Art: Description
- Jūjutsu: Hybrid art
- Kappō: Resuscitation techniques.

Ancestor schools
- Shin no Shintō-ryū • Yōshin-ryū

Descendant schools
- Ito-ha Shin'yō-ryū • Aikido • Bartitsu • Judo • Shindō Yōshin-ryū • Tenjin Shinyo Goshin-ryu, Kokusai Okazaki-ha Shin Tenshin Shin'yo-ryu Aiki-jūjutsu

Tenjin Shinyo-ryu (天神真楊流, Tenjin Shin'yō-ryū), meaning "Divine True Willow School", can be classified as a traditional school (koryū) of jūjutsu. It was founded by Iso Mataemon Ryūkansai Minamoto no Masatari (磯又右衛門柳関斎源正足) in the 1830s. Its syllabus comprises atemi-waza (striking techniques), nage-waza (throwing techniques), torae-waza (immobilization methods), and shime-waza (choking techniques). Once a very popular jujutsu system in Japan, among the famous students who studied the art were Kanō Jigorō and Morihei Ueshiba. Kanō founded the modern art of judo, and Ueshiba founded aikido.

== Description ==
Essentially, Tenjin Shin'yō-ryū is the amalgamation of two separate systems of jūjutsu: the Yōshin-ryū and Shin no Shintō-ryū. The distinctive feature of this particular school is the use of atemi or strikes to disrupt the balance of the opponent as well as a more flexible and flowing movement of the body than seen in some older schools of jūjutsu. The older schools employ somewhat larger and slower movements to mimic the use of armour on the battlefield. Tenjin Shin'yō-ryū was developed after the period of civil war in Japan; thus, without armor, the movements emphasized were faster and more strikes were incorporated. The strikes were also primarily aimed at human vital points and meridians, which were exposed due to the lack of armor.

Like most koryu, the Tenjin Shin'yō-ryū follows the bujutsu Menkyo ranking system, as opposed to the budo kyū/dan system.

== The sources of the art ==
Shin no Shintō-ryū was created by a palace guard at Osaka castle named Yamamoto Tamiza Hideya who had studied Yōshin-ryū before implementing changes in the curriculum and paring down the system to 68 techniques.

Iso Mataemon Masatari (1787–1863) studied Yōshin-ryū under Hitotsuyanagi Oribe and Shin no Shintō-ryū under Homma Jouemon. He then went traveling and training throughout the country where he engaged in various competitions. It is said that he was never beaten. According to tradition he was once involved in a fight involving a hundred assailants and it was this experience that further solidified the importance of atemi-waza, or striking techniques, in his system along with throwing and strangling techniques common to other systems of jūjutsu.

Iso created a composite system based on the techniques of the Yōshin-ryū, Shin no Shintō-ryū and his experience and founded his own tradition called the Tenjin Shin'yō-ryū around 1800. "Tenjin/Tenshin" meaning that it was divinely inspired, "Shin" from Shintō-ryū and "yō" from the Yōshin-ryū. Iso became the jūjutsu instructor to the Tokugawa shogunate and his school flourished to become the most popular school of jūjutsu of the time (1848–1864). Iso taught 5000 students in that time.

After the Meiji Restoration of 1868 the study of jūjutsu fell into decline generally and this affected the Tenjin Shin'yō-ryū as well.

== Training methodology ==
The training methodology, as with most koryu systems, is kata based or a form of pre-arranged fighting. Students learn the specific subtleties, or the more hidden meaning of the form, through the continuous repetitions of the katas. There are over 124 kata of this classical jūjutsu, unarmed combat teaching from seated positions, standing positions, weapons defence, and also includes special healing methods and resuscitation (kappo).

Certain katas are subject to secrecy, due to the nature of lethal effects and subject of martial traditions. The kappo or resuscitation techniques, were a secret, however Kubota now teaches at Kōdōkan to the leading teachers at the seminars. The higher level of kata, not only relates to the aspect of physical movements, but the deeper inner meanings, or link between the philosophy, and mindset of the practitioner. Such kata are taught only to students with many years of commitment and experience.

== Tenjin Shin'yō-ryū Today ==
With the 5th headmaster, Iso Mataemon dying without designating a successor, the 4th headmaster passed the entire body of knowledge required for full mastery to three Shihans (menkyo kaiden's with impeccable moral character) that were identified and designated as such by the 3rd headmaster (the grandfather of the 5th headmaster), and a fourth as selected by the 4th headmaster to fulfill the "divine scheme" of transferring the school outside of the family lineage.

One of these Shihans, Torijiro Yagi, was able to complete and learn the additional teachings provided to them by the 4th headmaster, and as such is the one and only true and complete lineage of Tenjin Shin'yō-ryū today. Although there exist a number of individuals who received Menkyo Kaiden awards in the art from legitimate headmasters of the past, none of them have the final "keys" to be considered as having received the full transmission. Torajiro Yagi passed the full transmission of the body of knowledge to Fusataro Sakamoto, who in turn passed the full transmission of the body of knowledge to the one and only master of the ryu today, Kubota Toshihiro.

As the leading active teacher is Toshihiro Kubota whose legitimacy in preserving the teachings of his teacher Sakamoto Fusataro is supported by senior exponents of other ko-ryū. He formed his dojo and organization, the Tenyokai, in 1978. Receiving instruction in both judo and Tenshin Shinyo ryu from his teacher Sakamoto he received his license in 1973. In his seventies, he still actively participates in the teaching of the art three times a week. Apart from locals, his students are from far ranging countries such as Australia, Germany, Israel, Sweden and England. In addition to Tenjin Shin'yō-ryū jūjutsu, Kubota holds a 7th dan in judo.

A second, although incomplete line of the Tenjin Shin'yō-ryū traces its lineage through Tobari Kazu who received her training from Tobari Takisaburo. Tobari had in turn studied under Iso Mataichiro, the younger brother of the fourth headmaster of the ryu. She maintained the dual traditions of Tenjin Shin'yō-ryū and the Shin no Shintō-ryū until her death some years ago, running a small dojo in Osaka in which many of her students were strong judo players. As this line seems to have become inactive in recent years its survival is cast in some doubt.

Miyamoto Hanzo was a student of both Inoue Keitaro and Tozawa Tokusaburō (戸沢 徳三郎, 1848–1912). Tozawa is believed to have briefly taught jujutsu to aikido founder Ueshiba Morihei. In Miyamoto, who was also very well known as a strong judo man, once again we see the connection between this classical school of jūjutsu and modern judo. Miyamoto taught Aimiya Kazusaburo, who himself produced a number of strong students, but after suffering a stroke he was forced to stop teaching the art. Of those students it seems only Shibata Koichi currently continues to teach the art albeit upon a very limited scale.

Kanō Jigorō, the founder of judo, studied Tenjin Shin'yō-ryū jūjutsu for several years under two leading exponents of the day, Fukuda Hachinosuke and 3rd generation headmaster Iso Mataemon Masatomo. The Tenshin Shin'yō-ryū, along with the Kitō-ryū, played a role of seminal importance to the development of Kanō's judo system. Although modified for safe sport use, the influence of the Tenjin Shin'yō-ryū can be seen today in many of judo's core throwing techniques such as seoi nage (shoulder throw), harai goshi (sweeping hip throw) and osoto gari (outer reap) to name but a few. The Itsutsu no kata, or the five forms, of Kodokan judo preserve techniques of an esoteric nature found in the Tenjin Shin'yō-ryū's "five teachings of the kuden" kata and techniques from the Kime no kata are said to show the influence of Tenjin Shin'yō-ryū tactics. In this way while creating a modern sport Kanō was able to preserve some aspects of the Tenjin Shin'yō-ryū in his art and it is for this reason that contemporary judo participants tend to show such an interest in this particular ko-ryū jūjutsu form.
