= Sekiguchi-ryū =

Japanese martial art

Sekiguchi-ryū (関口流)
- Ko-ryū

Foundation
- Founder: Sekiguchi (Jushin) Yarokuemon Ujimune
- Date founded: c. 1640
- Period founded: Sengoku period

Current information
- Current headmaster: Sekiguchi Yoshio

Arts taught
- Art: Description
- Jujutsu: Grappling (unarmed or with minor weapons)
- Kenjutsu: Sword art
- Iaijutsu: Sword drawing art

Ancestor schools
- Shinshin-ryū; Kishu Sekiguchi-ryū

Descendant schools
- Daito-ryū (not Daito-ryū Aikijūjutsu)

Sekiguchi-ryū (関口流), or Sekiguchi Shin Shin-ryū (関口新心流), is a Japanese martial art founded in the mid-17th century, notable for its kenjutsu, iaijutsu, and jujutsu, including the art of kyusho-jutsu.

== History ==
The founder of Sekiguchi-ryū was Sekiguchi Yarokuemon Ujimune, also known as Sekiguchi Jushin. Jushin was part of the Seiwa Genji Imagawa clan of the Sengoku period. When the once powerful Imagawa clan fell to the conquests of Oda Nobunaga, Jushin decided to dedicate his life to martial arts training. He left the castle for the Atago Mountains where he underwent intense physical and spiritual training. The result of that training became known as Sekiguchi Shin Shin-ryū, and rumors of the wanderer and of his art rang throughout the country.

Tokugawa Yorinobu, head of the Kishu Han (modern day Wakayama Prefecture) had heard about Jushin and after meeting him Jushin was asked to be a permanent guest of the Han at Wakayama castle and teach Sekiguchi-ryū. From there the art spread all the way to Edo Tokugawa where the 8th Tokugawa shōgun, Tokugawa Yoshimune, became a menkyo kaiden of Sekiguchi-ryū.

During World War II many of the schools documents containing history and techniques were lost in fires from Allied bombing. After a 15-year pause in training, Yoshitaro, the 12th sōke, with the help of head student Fujimura Shigeru restored the art and passed it on to the present sōke, 13th generation, Sekiguchi Yoshio.

== See also ==
- Gosho Motoharu
