= Yōshin-ryū =

Japanese martial arts traditions

Yōshin-ryū (楊心流)
- Ko-ryū

Foundation
- Founder: Akiyama Shirōbei Yoshitoki
- Date founded: mid 17th century
- Period founded: Early Edo period (1600–1867)

Current information
- Current headmaster: Koyama Noriko (Naginatajutsu), Maeda Hiroya (Jujutsu), Shibata Benjiro (Jujutsu) Masuda Kōichi (Hanbojutsu)

Arts taught
- Art: Description
- Jujutsu: Comprehensive art

Ancestor schools
- Sekiguchi-ryū, Yoshida-ryū,

Descendant schools
- Miura-ryū; Goshin-Sohei Miura-ryu; Totsuka-ha Yōshin-ryū; Nakamura Yōshin Ko-ryu; Shin Shin-ryū; Shin Yōshin-ryū; Sakkatsu Yōshin-ryū; Kurama Yōshin-ryū; Shindō Yōshin-ryū; Ryushin Katchu-ryū; Shin no Shinto-ryū; Tenjin Shin'yō-ryū; Jigō Tenshin-ryū/Ise Jitoku Tenshin-ryū; Judo; Wadō-ryū; Danzan-ryū; Fudoshin Ryu

Yōshin-ryū (楊心流) ("The School of the Willow Heart") is a common name for one of several different martial traditions founded in Japan during the Edo period. The most popular and well-known was the Yōshin-ryū founded by physician Akiyama Shirōbei Yoshitoki at Nagasaki Kyushu in 1642. The Akiyama line of Yōshin-ryū is perhaps the most influential school of jūjutsu to have existed in Japan. By the late Edo Period, Akiyama Yōshin-ryū had spread from its primary base in Fukuoka Prefecture Kyushu throughout Japan. By the Meiji era, Yōshin-ryū had spread overseas to Europe and North America, and to Australia and South Africa by the late Shōwa era.

Together with the Takenouchi-ryū (竹内流), and the Ryōi Shintō-ryū (良移心当流), the Yōshin-ryū (楊心流), was one of the three largest, most important and influential jūjutsu schools of the Edo period (江戸時代 Edo jidai 1603–1868) before the rise of judo.

== Curriculum and brief history ==
Akiyama Yōshin-ryū is noted for a very broad curriculum, which originally included jūjutsu and torite (grappling and arresting methods), bukijutsu (weapons methods), hyōhō (battlefield strategy), to the development of internal energy, or nairiki. It is believed several of these teachings were eventually absorbed by other jūjutsu traditions, notable among them being methods of kyusho atemi (the manipulation of pressure points).

Prior to his death in 1680, Akiyama Shirōbei Yoshitoki (秋山四郎兵衛芳年) passed the tradition to Ōe Senbei Hirotomi (大江千兵衛広富), who was largely responsible for codifying the 303 kata that comprise the jūjutsu curriculum. Ōe (died 1696) trained and qualified scores of students, who subsequently spread the art throughout Japan.

Historically, there were three predominant mainline branch houses (honke/seito) commencing with the third generation: the Miura line under Miura Sadaemon (三浦定右衛門), the Iwanaga line under Iwanaga Sennojō Yoshishige (岩永千之亟義重), and the Hano line under Hano Shinkurō (羽野新九郎). A majority of subsequent minor branch houses (bunke/baike) descend from these principal lineages.

A sub-branch of the Miura line has survived with an unbroken transmission of headmasters to the current day: the Yōshin-ryū bukijutsu / naginata school in Hiroshima, headed by Koyama Noriko (小山宜子). Koyama traces her lineage from Akiyama through a sixth generation headmaster, Hotta Magoemon (堀田孫右衛門). Hotta separated the bukijutsu and jūjutsu transmissions, awarding the former to Hoshino Kakūemon (星野角右衛門), and the latter to Kumabe Sessui (隈部節水). A parallel lineage that passed through nine generations of the Hoshino family continues in Kumamoto City Kyushu, and is headed by 13th generation inheritor Masuda Kōichi (舛田紘一). This line of Yōshin-ryū specialises in the use of the hanbo or 'half staff' (半棒). Masuda is also a seventh generation shihan in Negishi-ryū shurikenjutsu (根岸流手裏剣術). The jūjutsu transmission of the Miura mainline lineage is believed to have become extinct with the death of the 13th generation inheritor, Era Sajuro (恵良佐十郎). Notably, several minor houses of the Miura line were extinguished in the early twentieth century, among them the branch established by Satō Jirō Nagamasa (佐藤次郎) in 1728. It survived until the death of the eighth generation headmaster, Kaiga Itsuki Nomiya (海賀齊宮) in 1903.

The Iwanaga mainline eventually passed to Shiota Jindayū (塩田甚太夫), who in 1780 combined its teachings with the Suzuki-ryu (鈴木流) and Nanba Ippo-ryû (難波一甫流) to create the Kurama Yōshin-ryū (鞍馬楊心流). This tradition continues to be practised in Kagoshima city Kyushu, and is under the supervision of the twelfth generation headmaster, Shiota Tetsuya (塩田哲也). An alternate lineage is active on Kamikoshiki Island, under the supervision of thirteenth generation headmaster, Shiota Jinhide (塩田甚英).

== Hano line ==
The Hano mainline transmission survived into the early 20th century through the eighth generation headmaster, Santō Shinjūrō Kiyotake (山東新十郎清武) of Kumamoto Kyushu. Santō was perhaps better known as the seventh generation Headmaster of Miyamato Musashi's (宮本武蔵) famed Hyoho Niten Ichi-ryu (兵法二天一流) school of swordsmanship, and while he is known to have awarded complete transmission of Yōshin-ryū to at least five students, he did not appoint an inheritor to the tradition prior his death in 1909. Contemporary Yōshin-ryū jūjutsu dōjō led by shihan tracing their legacies through Santō's fully licensed students can be found in Osaka and Nagasaki, while a dōjō in Nara traces its descent through Ishii Riko Osamu (石井理子治). Ishii (died 1897) was the inheritor of a minor branch house of the Hano lineage established by Akasumi Tokuzenji Hakumine (赤住徳禪寺伯嶺) in 1753. These dōjō practice the received jūjutsu and bukijutsu curricula (including battojutsu and kenjutsu, bojutsu and hanbojutsu, naginatajutsu and sōjutsu, and kusarigamajutsu).

In common with other koryū, the curriculum is contained in a series of mokuroku (目録) or 'catalog' scrolls, presented when the practitioner achieves an appropriate level of technical and moral proficiency. The Hano lineage provides four levels of technical transmission: Shoden (初伝), chuden (中伝), joden (上伝) and kaiden (皆伝), which are distributed across six licenses. While several of the transmission scrolls and documents are common to all lineages, others are unique to specific lines of transmission. In the Hano lineage the first license to be awarded is the kirigami menjo (切り紙免状), and the last is the menkyo kaiden-no-maki (免許皆伝之巻). Fuzoku (auxiliary) bukijutsu methods are addressed in the betsuden mokuroku (別伝目録), while a range of esoteric knowledge inclusive of religious teachings or shinpi (神秘), and hyōhō (兵法), are recorded in manuals known collectively as densho (傳書).

A defining characteristic of historic Yōshin-ryū makimono is the finely detailed artwork they incorporate, marking them as excellent examples of the Japanese emakimono (絵巻物) or "picture scroll" tradition.

== Descendants ==
Schools with varying degrees of descent from Akiyama Yōshin-ryū jūjutsu include:

Danzan ryu, Shin Yōshin-ryū, Shinshin-ryū, Sakkatsu Yōshin-ryū, Shin-no-Shindō ryū, Tenjin Shin'yō-ryū, Shindō Yōshin-ryū, Wadō-ryū karatedo, Ryushin Katchu-ryū, Ito-ha Shin'yō-ryū, Kurama Yōshin-ryū, Sogo Ryu Ju Jitsu, Kodokan Judo, and Fudoshin-ryu.

== Hontai Yōshin ryū – Takagi ryū Lineage ==
The schools of Hontai Yōshin-ryū – Takagi-ryū are not a part of the Akiyama Yōshin-ryū lineage, but are instead descended from Takenouchi-ryū.

== See also ==
- Ryōi Shintō-ryū
