= Monica Sone =

Japanese-American writer (1919–2011)

Monica Sone (so-nay)
- Kazuko Itoi, Broadway High School, class of 1937
- Born: Kazuko Itoi; September 1, 1919; Seattle, Washington
- Died: September 5, 2011 (aged 92); Canton, Ohio
- Occupations: author, psychologist
- Writing career
- Genre: autobiography
- Subject: Japanese American internment
- Notable work: Nisei Daughter

Monica Sone (September 1, 1919 – September 5, 2011), born Kazuko Itoi, was a Japanese American writer, best known for her 1953 autobiographical memoir Nisei Daughter, which tells of the Japanese American experience in Seattle during the 1920s and 1930s and in the World War II internment camps, and is an important text in Asian American and Women's Studies courses.

== Early life ==
Sone grew up in Seattle, where her parents, immigrants from Japan, managed a hotel. Like many Nisei children, her education included American classes and extra Japanese language and cultural courses, the latter of which were held at Seattle's Nihon Go Gakko; later, she and her family visited relatives in Japan. After graduating from Broadway High School she attended secretarial school, completing the two-year course in just one year. Soon after, she contracted tuberculosis and spent nine months at Firland Sanatorium with future best-selling author of The Egg and I, Betty MacDonald. Upon her release from the sanatorium, Sone discovered that her family had moved to a house in Seattle's Beacon Hill neighborhood.

On February 19, 1942, President Franklin Roosevelt issued Executive Order 9066, authorizing military commanders to designate areas from which "any or all persons may be excluded" and paving the way for the removal of all Japanese Americans from the West Coast. Sone was 21 when she and her family were "evacuated" from their home in Seattle's Beacon Hill neighborhood to the Puyallup Assembly Center, in May 1942. Three months later, the Itois were transferred to the War Relocation Authority camp at Minidoka, Idaho. In 1943, Sone was allowed to leave camp after passing the so-called "loyalty questionnaire" and relocated to the Chicago area, where she worked as a dental assistant and lived with a white Presbyterian minister and his family.

== Career ==
Sone eventually received a scholarship to attend Hanover College, called "Wendell College" in her memoir, a Presbyterian school in Indiana. She finished her undergraduate degree at Hanover and in 1949 received a master's degree in clinical psychology from Case Western Reserve University.

After finishing her postgraduate work at Case Western, Sone became a clinical psychologist and social worker for the Catholic Community League, practicing for 38 years. She married Geary Sone, and the couple settled in Canton, Ohio, where they raised four children. She died in Canton shortly after she turned 92.

== Nisei Daughter ==
Sone's best-known work, the memoir Nisei Daughter, was originally published by Little, Brown in 1953. It tells the story of a Japanese immigrant family's life in the United States before and during the war. Sone's parents are from Japan (Issei), and their children are born in the States, making them Nisei (as in the title). The book explores the cultural differences the family faced before the war, both in the States and on a visit to Japan, and their incarceration during World War II. The story is told from Sone's perspective. The cover photograph of the original edition shows Sone and her sister Sammy smiling and sitting on the steps of the Carrollton Hotel, their father's establishment, in 1932.

Exposition concerning the initial meeting and marriage of Sone's parents and the births of their four children is described early in the book. A comfortable childhood existence is nostalgically portrayed in the environs of the Skid Road hotel, which Mr. Itoi operates near the Seattle waterfront. He is portrayed as a hard worker and a resourceful provider, refusing rooms to characters who seem drunk or otherwise unsavory, and continually repairing and improving his establishment. Mrs. Itoi is more colorfully portrayed as a woman who is capable of having fun and who wants to indulge her children in their creativity and their whims. The "shocking" fact of life that Sone discovers when she is six is that she is ethnic Japanese and, because of that fact, she and her siblings must attend weekday sessions at Seattle's Japanese school rather than play after their regular grammar school classes. The conflict between Sone's Japanese heritage and her American situation is developed throughout the book as its main theme, as the author continually searches for who she is and where she belongs.

Sone offers a first-hand account of life at the Puyallup Assembly Center and at Minidoka, one of ten public concentration camps where Japanese Americans were detained during the war. Her account offers her observations of life in the camps and describes how its residents struggled to accommodate their situation. By the time Nisei Daughter was reissued in 1979, Americans were becoming increasingly aware of and sensitive to mistreatment of people of Japanese descent in the United States during World War II. The role of Nikkei in raising awareness to their internment story reflected in Sone's preface for the 1979 edition.

== Published works ==
- Sone, M. (1996). Introduction: S. Maret, "The desert years: An annotated bibliography of Japanese American internment in Arizona during World War II." Bulletin of Bibliography (53: 2), pp 71–108.
- Sone, M. (1953). Nisei daughter. Boston: Little, Brown and Company.

== See also ==
- History of the Japanese in Seattle
- Japanese American internment
- List of Asian American writers

== Critical studies ==
- Connor, K. R. (2005). "Truth and talent in interpreting ethnic American autobiography: From white to black and beyond". In: L. Long (ed). White Scholars/African American texts.(pp. 209–22). New Brunswick, NJ: Rutgers University Press.
- Cooper, J. (2002). "A two-headed freak and a bad wife search for home: Border crossing in Nisei Daughter and The Mixquiahuala Letters". In: J. Benito & A. M. Manzanas (eds.). Literature and ethnicity in the cultural borderlands. (pp. 159–73). Amsterdam: Rodopi.
- Hoffman, W. D. (2005). "Home, memory, and narrative in Monica Sone's Nisei Daughter". In: K. Lawrence & F. Cheung (eds.). Recovered legacies: Authority and identity in early Asian American literature.(pp. 229–48) Philadelphia: Temple University Press.
- Jacobs, M. (n.d.). "Monica Sone's Nisei Daughter". Western Women's Autobiographies Database. [7]
- Lim, S. Geok-lin. (1990). Japanese American women's life stories: Maternality in Monica Sone's Nisei Daughter and Joy Kogawa's Obasan. Feminist Studies, 16 (2): 288-312.
- Madsen, D. L. (2005). Monica Sone. Asian American writers. Farmington Hills, MI: Thomsen Gale.
- Stephen, S. H. (1992)."Protest and accommodation, self-satire and self-effacement, and Monica Sone's Nisei Daughter". In: J. R. Payne (ed.). Multicultural autobiography: American lives. (pp. 207–47). Knoxville: University of Tennessee.
- Yamamoto, T. (2001). "Nisei Daughter by Monica Sone". In: S. C. Wong & S. H. Sumida (eds.). A resource guide to Asian American literature. (pp. 151–58). New York: Modern Language Association of America.
