= History of the Japanese in Seattle =

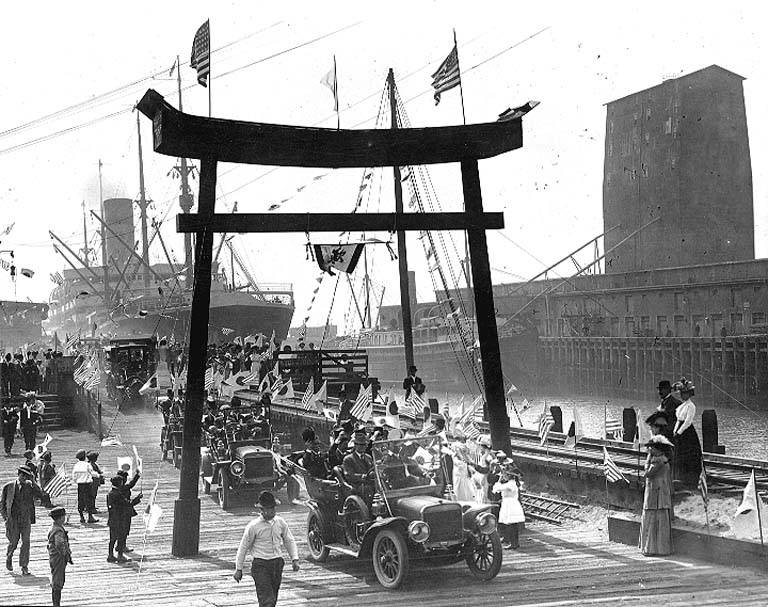
Japanese trade delegation arriving at Seattle's Smith Cove in 1909

Seattle and its surrounding metro area in the U.S. state of Washington has historically been home to a significant population of Japanese Americans and Japanese expatriates, whose origins date back to the second half of the 19th century. Prior to World War II, Seattle's downtown Japanese community had grown to become the second largest Nihonmachi on the West Coast of North America. After the Japanese attack on Pearl Harbor in 1941, the Japanese community in Seattle was deeply impacted by the internment of Japanese Americans. After the war, only about 60-70% of the incarcerated population returned to their prewar homes across the state of Washington.

Nevertheless, the Japanese community has steadily grown in the decades since. As of 2019, Seattle ranked as the fourth largest metropolitan area in the contiguous United States in terms of its Japanese population (fifth if including Hawaii).

== History ==
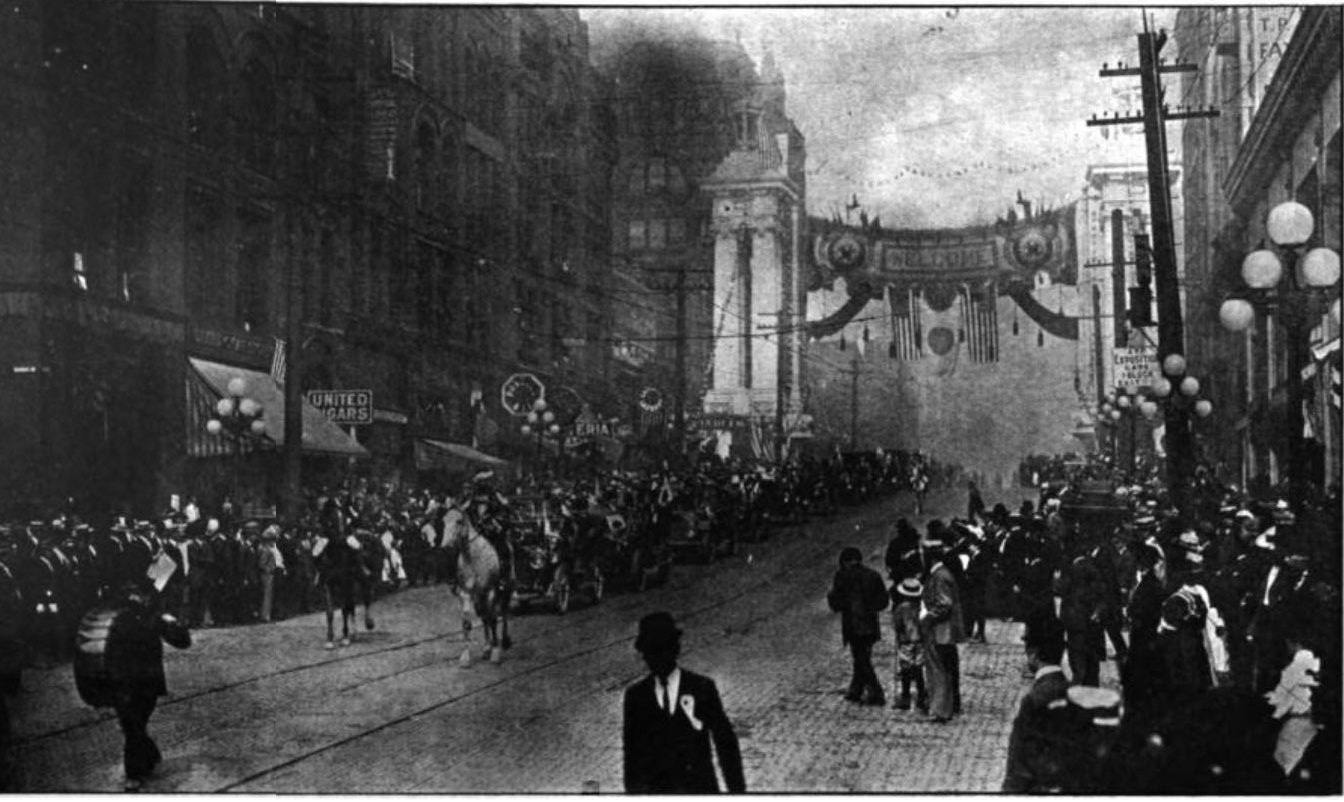
Japanese Day parade in 1909 during the Alaska–Yukon–Pacific Exposition

=== Early years ===
Japan emerged from self-imposed isolation during the Meiji Restoration, and began to officially sponsor emigration programs in 1885. As a result, the period from the 1880s to the early 1900s brought a wave of Japanese immigration to the Seattle area. One early catalyst for this immigration was the Chinese Exclusion Act of 1882 which, along with a spate of anti-Chinese violence (culminating in the Seattle riot of 1886), led to the departure of nearly all Chinese from the Seattle area. The departure of Chinese laborers opened the door for Japanese immigrants to fill the labor void.

In 1896, when the Nippon Yusen Kaisha steamers began traveling between Japan and Seattle, there were about 200 ethnic Japanese living in Seattle. By 1910, that population had grown to 5,000. The Japanese Consulate, which had established an office in Tacoma in 1895, moved to Seattle in 1901. In those early years, Seattle was often referred to as "Sashi" (沙市) or "Sakō" (沙港) in Japanese language publications using ateji spelling.

Early Japanese immigrants consisted of mostly single males hoping to amass wealth before returning to Japan. Many of these men were younger sons from families who, due in large part to the Japanese practice of primogeniture, were motivated to establish themselves independently abroad. These first generation Issei immigrants came primarily from small towns and rural areas in the southern Japanese prefectures of Hiroshima, Yamaguchi, Kumamoto, and Fukuoka, a pattern that continued up to the Asian immigration ban in 1924.

A majority of the men that came during this period found work in the surrounding canneries, railroads, and the massive logging industry around the Seattle area. These labor-intensive jobs did not provide the kind of rapid economic advancement they had planned on for their short three to five year stays. Because most of the initial Japanese immigrants during this period had only planned to stay temporarily, the early community was unstable with a ratio of 5 men to every woman and very little social, economic, or religious support.

=== Anti-Asian sentiment and legislation ===
Long before the repercussions stemming from World War II events, Japanese immigrants to the Seattle area faced considerable racism, much tied to labor disputes that created a divide with the predominantly white population. These tensions were often inflamed by news outlets and politicians leading to petitions for Japanese exclusion and public demonstrations opposed to the import of Japanese labor. Community struggles were further exacerbated by the forced segregation and expulsions of Asian immigrants, who were unable to rent or purchase homes in West Seattle, Magnolia and other Seattle area neighborhoods.

The region's first anti-Japanese organization was formed in 1894, and succeeded in expelling many of the 400-500 Japanese laborers from the White River Valley area south of Seattle. The Anti-Japanese League of Washington was formed in 1916 and campaigned in support of alien land laws in Washington. By the early 1920s, the Washington state legislature had succeeded in passing an alien land law that prohibited the Issei from owning land. The constitutionality of this act was challenged, but ultimately upheld by the United States Supreme Court in the 1922 decision Yamashita v. Hinkle.

In 1907, the Gentlemen's Agreement between the governments of Japan and the U.S. ended the immigration of Japanese laborers. However, it did allow for the immigration of spouses and children of Japanese immigrants already in the United States. Prior to 1908, around seven out of eight ethnic Japanese in the continental United States were men. By 1924, due to the spousal immigration allowance, the ratio had changed to approximately four women to every six men. The Immigration Act of 1924 subsequently banned the immigration of all but a few token Japanese.

=== Community growth ===
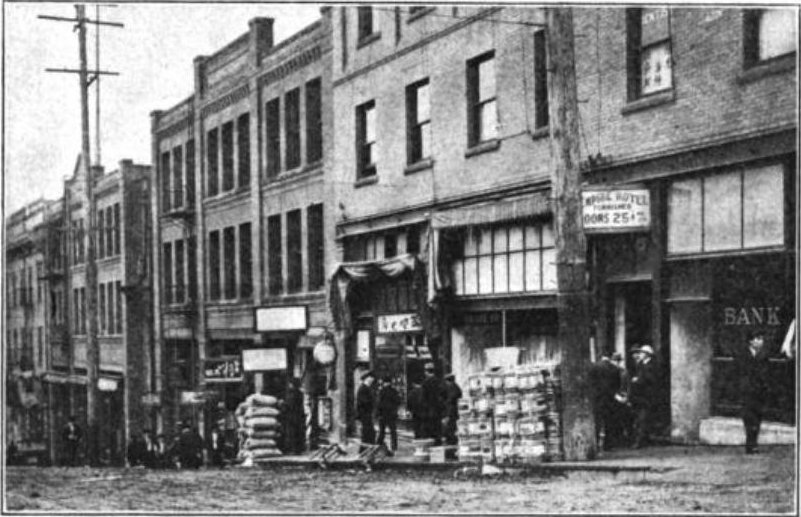
A street in Seattle's Nihonmachi in 1909

Federal laws prohibiting Asian immigrants from naturalization, coupled with alien land laws and residential segregation barriers, made it difficult for ethnic Japanese to find housing for their families outside the central Seattle port area. Formidable occupational barriers also existed. Both Issei and their Nisei descendants were unable to gain entry into trade unions. Jobs outside of the immigrant community, other than those involving menial and unskilled labor, were rare even for college graduates.

Due in large part to these difficulties, many Japanese immigrants relied on their own communities for livelihood and support. They were successful in establishing a Nihonmachi, or Japantown, in the International District of Seattle and in downtown Tacoma by the 1900s. The Nihonmachi became the heart of the Japanese community with bathhouses, barbers, laundromats, and entertainment facilities. By 1919, there were more than 200 Japanese-operated hotels in Seattle. A number of ethnic Japanese families were raised in Nihonmachi hotels and apartments, as well as in back rooms behind storefronts. Over time, Seattle's Japantown became informally known as the area bounded by Yesler Way on the north, 4th Avenue on the west, Dearborn Street on the south, and 14th Avenue on the east.

In July 1902, the Seattle Japanese Language School was opened under the name of Nipponjinkai Juzoku Shogakko (Elementary School attached to the Japanese Association). The establishment of this school was followed by language schools opening in Fife in 1909 and another in Tacoma by 1911. The creation of these schools illustrated the desire from Japanese immigrants to pass on their language and culture to later generations.

Seattle's Japantown was a vibrant and bustling community by the early 1920s. The Immigration Act of 1924 and the Great Depression, however, had a dampening effect, leading to significant departures both to California and back to Japan. Nevertheless, as the second generation of ethnic Japanese (known as Nisei) began to grow up, the Japanese immigrants who had once planned to return to Japan after only a few years, had begun seeing themselves as settlers. By the 1930s the ethnic Japanese population living in Seattle had reached 8,448, out of a total city population of 368,583 meaning that, "Japanese were Seattle's largest non-white group, and the fourth-largest group behind several European nationalities." Prior to World War II, Seattle's Nihonmachi had become the second largest Japantown on the West Coast of North America.

East of Lake Washington, Japanese immigrant labor helped clear recently logged land to make it suitable to support small scale farming on leased plots. During the 20th century, the Japanese farming community became increasingly well established. Prior to World War II, some 90 percent of the agricultural workforce on the so-called "Eastside" was of Japanese ancestry.

=== World War II ===
Within days of the attack on Pearl Harbor in December 7, 1941, the FBI began arresting Seattle area Japanese teachers, priests, and other community leaders. Not long after, on February 19, 1942, President Franklin D. Roosevelt issued and signed Executive Order 9066, clearing the way for the mass incarceration of all persons of Japanese ancestry on the American West Coast in inland concentration camps.

Seattle's Japanese community received almost no active support during this time. Among the few exceptions included University of Washington President Lee Paul Sieg, who took a leadership role in advocating for and facilitating the transfer of Nisei students to universities and colleges outside the West Coast region to help them avoid being interned. In spite of his efforts, about 450 students were caught up in the oncoming internment and were forced to interrupt (in many cases permanently) their education. Walt and Milly Woodward of the Bainbridge Island Review were the only West Coast editors to openly criticize Executive Order 9066. They would continue to advocate for members of the Bainbridge Island Japanese community during the war and help welcome them upon their eventual return. Tacoma mayor Harry P. Cain was one of only two elected officials on the West Coast to publicly oppose the government's internment of 110,000 Japanese Americans, in stark contrast to Washington congressional members Henry M. Jackson and Warren Magnuson. Jackson in particular, strongly advocated for the removal and exclusion of ethnic Japanese from the Pacific Coast both during and even after the war.

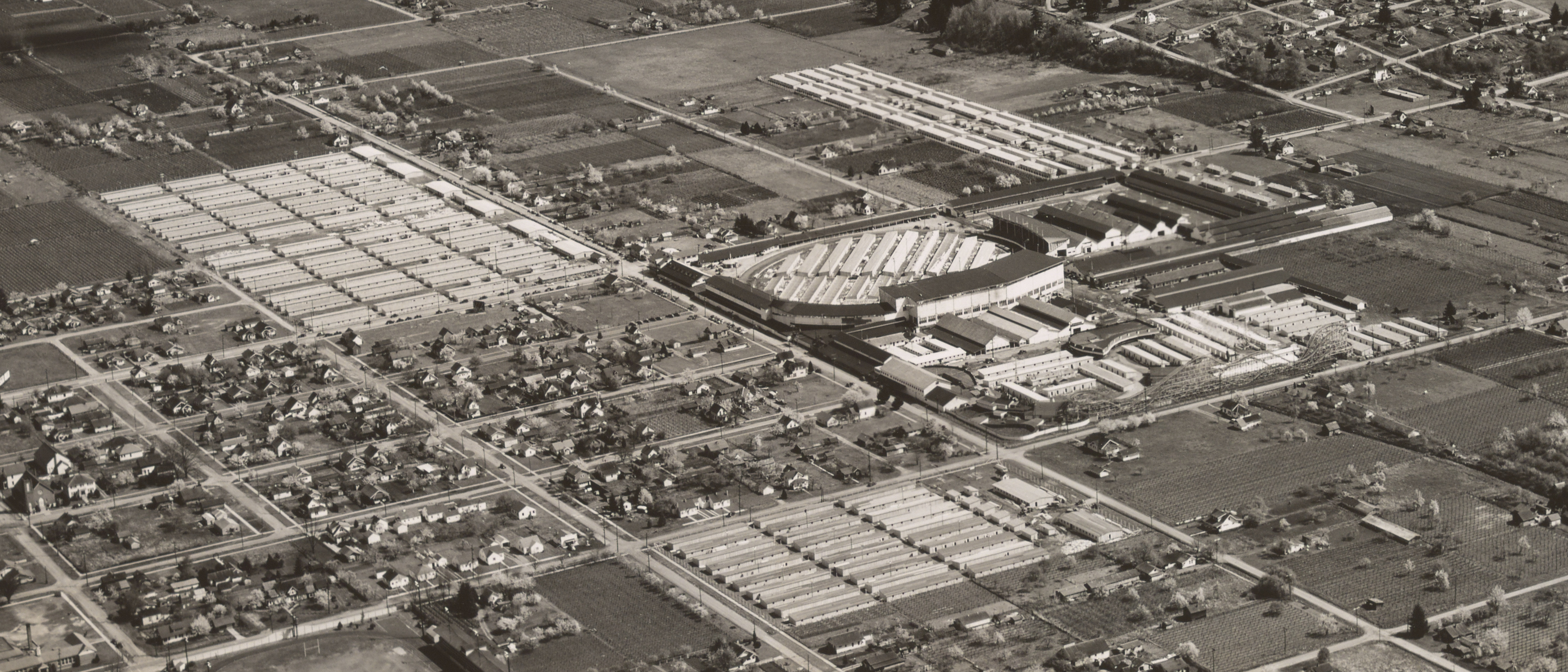
Camp Harmony in Puyallup, April 1942

By the end of March, 1942, all ethnic Japanese residents on Bainbridge Island had been removed and sent to the Manzanar camp in California. Most of the remaining 9,600 Japanese Americans from the Seattle area were forced to live behind barbed wire in converted livestock stalls and parking lots on the Puyallup Valley Fair grounds for several months while the War Relocation Authority oversaw the construction of longer term concentration camps further inland. The temporary assembly center in Puyallup was given the name Camp Harmony. Because of the internment, many members of the Japanese community permanently lost their businesses and residences. Most members of the Seattle area Japanese community that had been incarcerated at Camp Harmony were sent in groups by rail to the Minidoka Relocation Center in Idaho later in 1942, following the completion of that camp's construction.

As the war wound down, camp internees were allowed to return to the Pacific Coast, with those who chose to come back to Seattle staying in churches, other persons' residences, and the Seattle Japanese Language School building as they attempted to rebuild their lives. Seattle area residents who had been interned at Minidoka (sometimes referred to as "Hunt Camp") named their temporary home at the language school the "Hunt Hotel." Japanese exclusion groups flared up in the Seattle area in response to the return of the internees, but after encountering some community resistance, eventually disappeared. Nevertheless, returning Japanese often encountered overt racism. Across the entire state of Washington, only about 60-70% of the Japanese population returned to their prewar homes. Some areas saw even less: on the Eastside, only 11 families out of more than 60 chose to return. On Bainbridge Island, about half of the relocated Japanese community made the decision to come back, where they received a notably more positive reception than elsewhere.

=== Postwar education and remembrance ===
In 1978, the initial Day of Remembrance (observing the day that Executive Order 9066 was signed), was held at the former site of the Puyallup Assembly Center. This was the site where more than 7,000 people of Japanese descent from Western Washington and Alaska were held before being transported to more permanent concentration camps further inland.

In 1981, Seattle was one of ten cities in which public hearings were held by the Commission on Wartime Relocation and Internment of Civilians, in which public testimonies were heard and recorded regarding the Japanese American internment.

The Nikkei Heritage Association of Washington started the "Omoide" education program to memorialize the incarceration of the Japanese people. In 2008 UW held an honorary graduation ceremony, The Long Journey Home, for the Japanese who had seen their studies cut short, with 200 former students, most of whom were in their 80s at the time, and family members of former students present. Tetsuden Kashima, an ethnic studies professor of the university, presented the degrees.

The Bainbridge Island Japanese American Exclusion Memorial, built in memory of Japanese Americans interned from Bainbridge Island, was completed and opened to the public in 2011.

== Economy ==
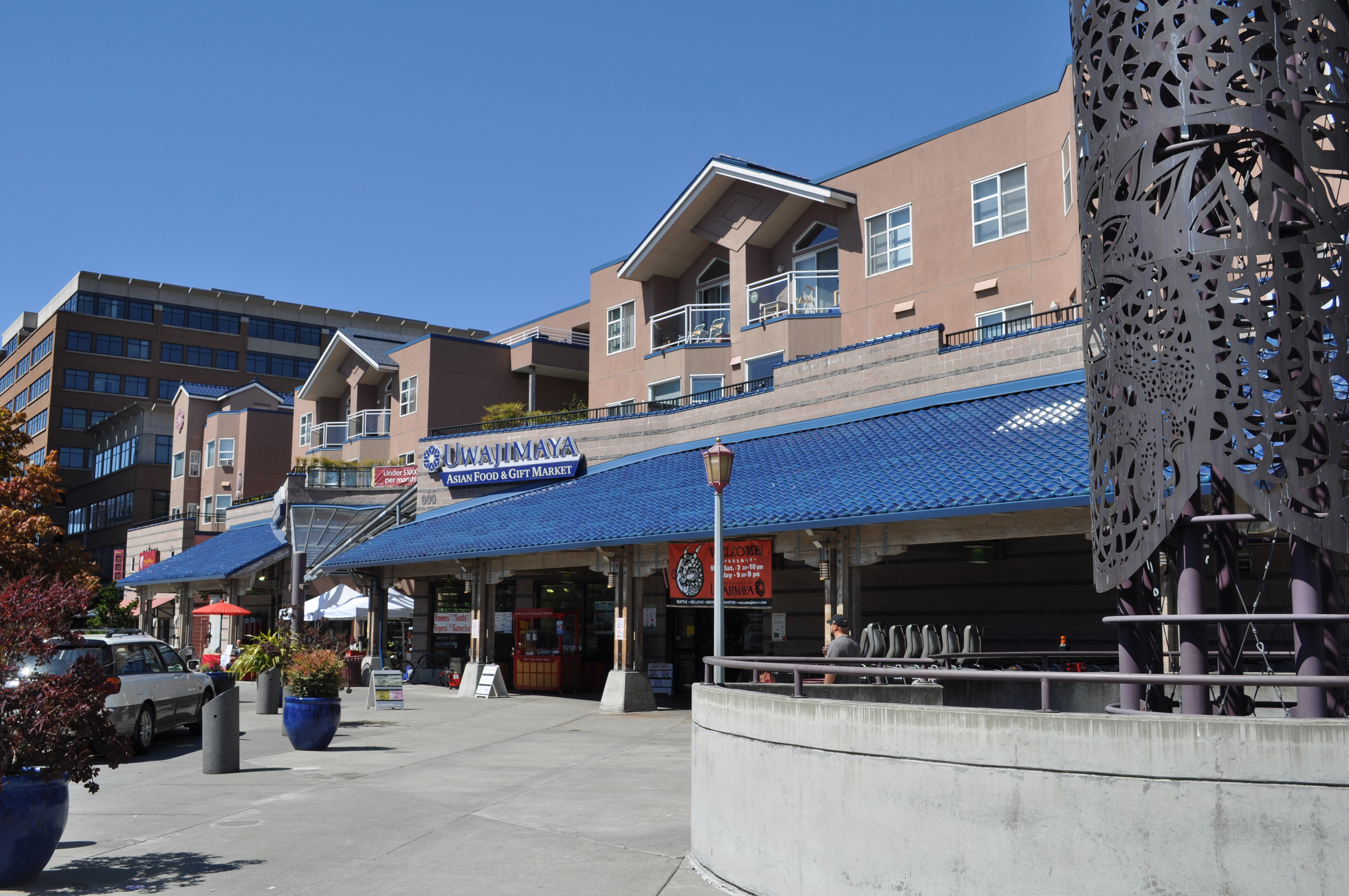
The Uwajimaya flagship store in Seattle

Early Japanese settlers worked in coal mines, canneries of salmon products, railroad construction areas, and sawmills. Later, service industries and businesses opened within the Nihonmachi, often aided by the traditional cooperative financing approach known as tanomoshi.

In 1889 Manjiro Morita founded a salmon fishing business(Seattle), In 1896, Manjiro Morita ran the first inn in Seattle called Cosmo House. Along with being the first Japanese individual to be a landowner in Seattle, he went on to be profiled with merchant and banker Masajiro Furuya for his achievements by the North American times, a Japanese American newspaper started in Seattle.

First established in 1913, the Seattle midwife association has included Japanese and Japanese American midwives, and has been recorded back to a 1918 photo of the Japanese portion of the Seattle midwives association which included practitioners and their children. In King County in 1920 there was 36 licensed Japanese immigrant midwives, 40 in the state, one of the largest industries for Japanese immigrant women labor outside of agriculture.

By the 1920s farms owned or tended by ethnic Japanese families had produced about 75% of the produce and half of the milk generated in the Seattle area. This included farms in Bellevue and the White River valley. Seattle's Pike Place Market was the point of sale of much of the produce. By the start of World War I, Japanese truck farmers occupied about 70% of the market stalls.

Founded in 1928 in Tacoma, the Asian supermarket chain Uwajimaya closed during the Japanese American internment. It reopened in Seattle's International District following the end of World War II. Uwajimaya opened its first branch in Bellevue, Washington in 1978 and opened another branch in Renton, Washington in 2009.

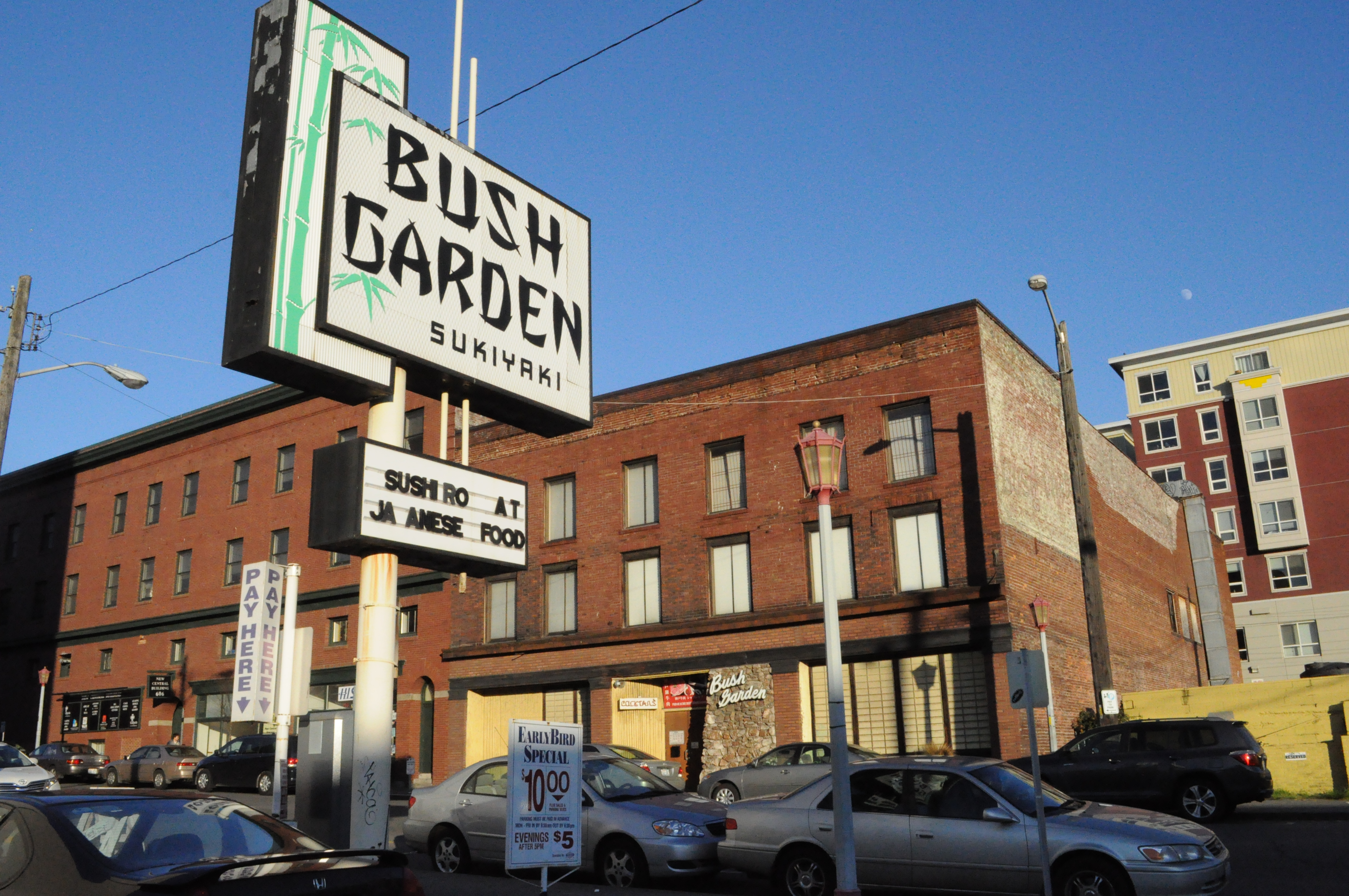
Bush Garden restaurant in 2009, before its closure

First opening in 1904, Seattle's restaurant Maneki was built to resemble a three-story Japanese castle and could seat up to five hundred customers. It was at this elaborate structure that the future Japanese prime minister Takeo Miki once worked while supporting himself as a student. During World War II, when the ethnic Japanese community had been removed from the city, the castle-like building was looted and vandalized. Too badly damaged to be restored, the restaurant reopened after the war in its current location in Seattle's International District on a much more modest scale.

Seattle's Bush Garden restaurant was once considered a destination dining establishment, attracting visits from celebrities and politicians as well as locals. During the 1950s, its owners introduced tatami rooms in which diners could eat at floor level, but with a hidden pit where diners could extend their legs (a now not uncommon feature). In the 1970s, the restaurant became home to perhaps the first karaoke bar in the United States. A similar claim was made for Maneki.

Nintendo of America has been headquartered in Redmond, Washington since 1982.

== Print media ==
Seattle's first Japanese newspaper, the Report, was issued in 1899 and remained in circulation until about 1904.

Founded in 1902 by first generation immigrants and investors Kiyoshi Kumamoto, Kuranosuke Hiraide, Juji Yadagai, and Ichiro Yamamoto, the North American Post became one of the region's main Japanese newspapers. Originally called Hokubei Jiji (The North American Times), it was the country's third Japanese American newspaper. Before World War II, it had a daily circulation of about 9,000 copies. This included circulation in Spokane, Vancouver BC, Portland, San Francisco, Los Angeles, and Tokyo. At the start of World War II, the North American Times publisher, Sumio Arima, was arrested by the FBI. The paper was discontinued on March 14, 1942, when the incarceration of local Japanese American families began. After the war, the North American Times was revived in December 1946 as "The North American Post". Other daily Japanese papers in Seattle before World War II included Asahi Shinbun (launched in 1905) and Taihoku Nippo (The Great Northern Daily News, launched in 1910).

In 1928, James Sakamoto and his wife Misao founded the Japanese American Courier, the first Japanese American newspaper published entirely in English. Aimed specifically at the American-born Nisei, the Courier reported on Japanese affairs while encouraging its readers to assimilate into "Americanized" society. The Courier was instrumental in promoting and organizing Nisei sporting events, publicizing and encouraging Nisei social groups, and helping establish the civil rights organization that would become known as the Japanese American Citizens League. By 1940, its circulation had grown to 4,275 readers.

Not long after the Japanese attack on Pearl Harbor, all Seattle area Japanese newspapers ceased publication. Once the war ended, as people were released from the camps, some Japanese-language media started to reappear. In June 1946, the North American Post was revived, and its editor in chief was the same person (Sumio Arima) who published Hokubei Jiji before the war. Its publishers were the former editor of the Takoma Jijo, Sadahiko Ikoma, and Kunizo Maeno.

== Education ==
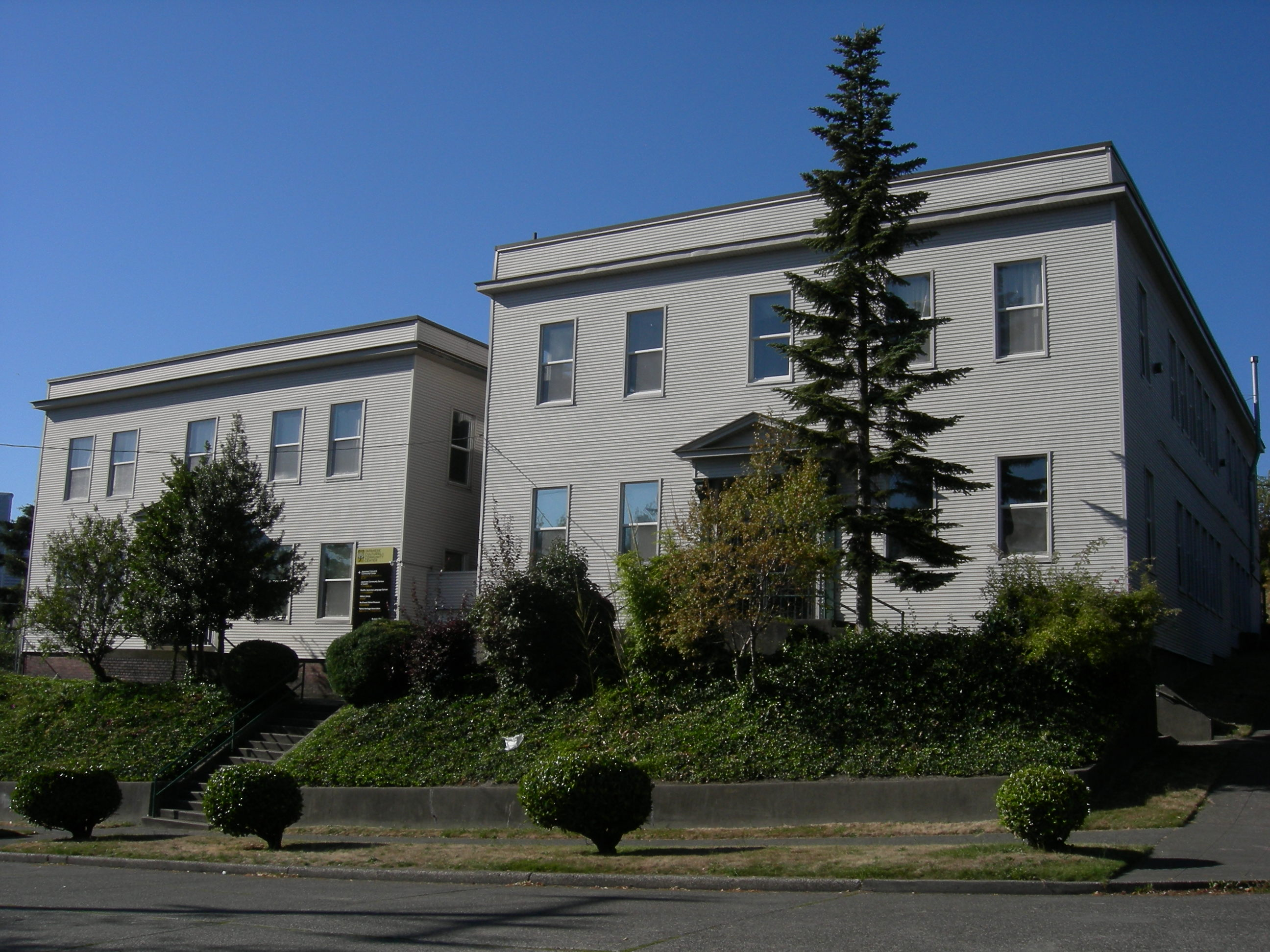
The Japanese Cultural and Community Center Complex in Seattle

Established in 1902, Seattle's Nihon Go Gakko (the Seattle Japanese Language School) is now operated by the Japanese Cultural & Community Center of Washington (JCCCW; ワシントン州日本文化会館 Washington-shū Nihon Bunka Kaikan). It was the largest Japanese school in the United States prior to World War II with nearly 2,000 students attending the school, spending two hours there a day, five days a week following regular schooling. Nihon Go Gakko is the continental United States's oldest Japanese language school.

A Japanese school was opened in Bellevue in 1918. Built in 1922, Tacoma's Nihon Go Gakko in the pre-World War II era served as Tacoma's Japanese language school.

Elementary schooling for Nisei children from Seattle's Nihonmachi primarily took place at Seattle's Main Street School and, later, Bailey Gatzert under the stewardship of its revered principal Ada Mahon, on up until World War II.

In the years preceding the American entry into World War II, Broadway High School on Seattle's Capitol Hill had the highest percentage of Japanese Americans of all Seattle high schools, with Nisei comprising about 25 percent of the student body in 1942. From 1938 to 1941, Japanese Americans had been valedictorians and salutatorians at the school. The removal of all ethnic Japanese students as part of the Japanese American Internment during World War II had a major impact on the school, and Broadway High School's final graduation ceremony took place only a few years later in 1946.

The Seattle Japanese School is a supplementary Japanese school, designated by the Japanese Ministry of Education (MEXT), which holds its classes in Bellevue.

== Historic buildings and gardens ==
Opened in December 1892 by Masajiro Furuya, the Furuya company was both a grocery store and a tailor shop. The company grew over the years to include Furuya Construction Company, along with expansions in Portland, Oregon; Tacoma, Washington; Vancouver, B.C. It was later noted as Pacific Northwest's most successful Japanese import/export business. In 1907 Masajiro Furuya, founded the Japanese Commercial Bank, which among others consolidated with his early businesses into Pacific Commercial Bank and Pacific Holding Company. Today the Furuya Building, bought by Masajiro Furuya in 1900 to adjust to working demands and expand his empire, remains standing after some reconstruction as a monument of Japanese American history in Seattle

Founded before 1907, the Seattle Dojo is the oldest judo dojo in the United States. Members included Kenji Yamada, who won the 1954 and 1955 individual US National Judo championship titles, and helped the Seattle Dojo win first place in the team competition at the US Judo Nationals in 1955.

Built in 1909, the Nippon Kan Theatre was a former Japanese theater. It served as a de facto Japanese community center in Seattle prior to World War II. It was busy several nights a week with actors and musicians from Japan, movies, concerts, judo and kendo competitions, and community meetings. The building is now listed on the National Register of Historic Places.

Built in 1910, the Panama Hotel was essential to the Japanese community as it housed businesses, sleeping quarters for residents and visitors, restaurants, and one of several sentō (Japanese bathhouses) in Seattle during the early twentieth century. The building was declared a National Historic Landmark in 2006, and in 2015 it was designated a National Treasure by the National Trust For Historic Preservation.

Started in 1927, Kubota Garden is a Japanese garden in the Rainier Beach neighborhood of Seattle, Washington.

The Seattle Japanese Garden, completed in 1960, is located in the Madison Park neighborhood. During their October, 1960 stop in Seattle, the Japanese Crown Prince Akihito and Crown Princess Michiko visited the newly opened garden. Together, they planted a cherry tree and a white birch, the latter a symbol (o-shirushi) of the Princess's family.

At the entrance to Seattle's Seward Park, in a wooded island filled with flowers between the circular entrance and exit road, is a taiko-gata stone lantern (tōrō) that was a gift of friendship from the City of Yokohama, Japan. It was given to the city in 1931 in gratitude to Seattle's assistance to Yokohama after the 1923 Great Kantō earthquake. Also near the entrance to Seward Park was a Japanese style wooden torii, originally built for Seattle's Potlatch festival in 1934. The wooden torii was later removed in the mid-1980s due to decay, and a replacement made with stone columns and timber cross beams was completed by 2021 and formally dedicated in 2022.

Historic buildings and gardens
The Seattle Dojo

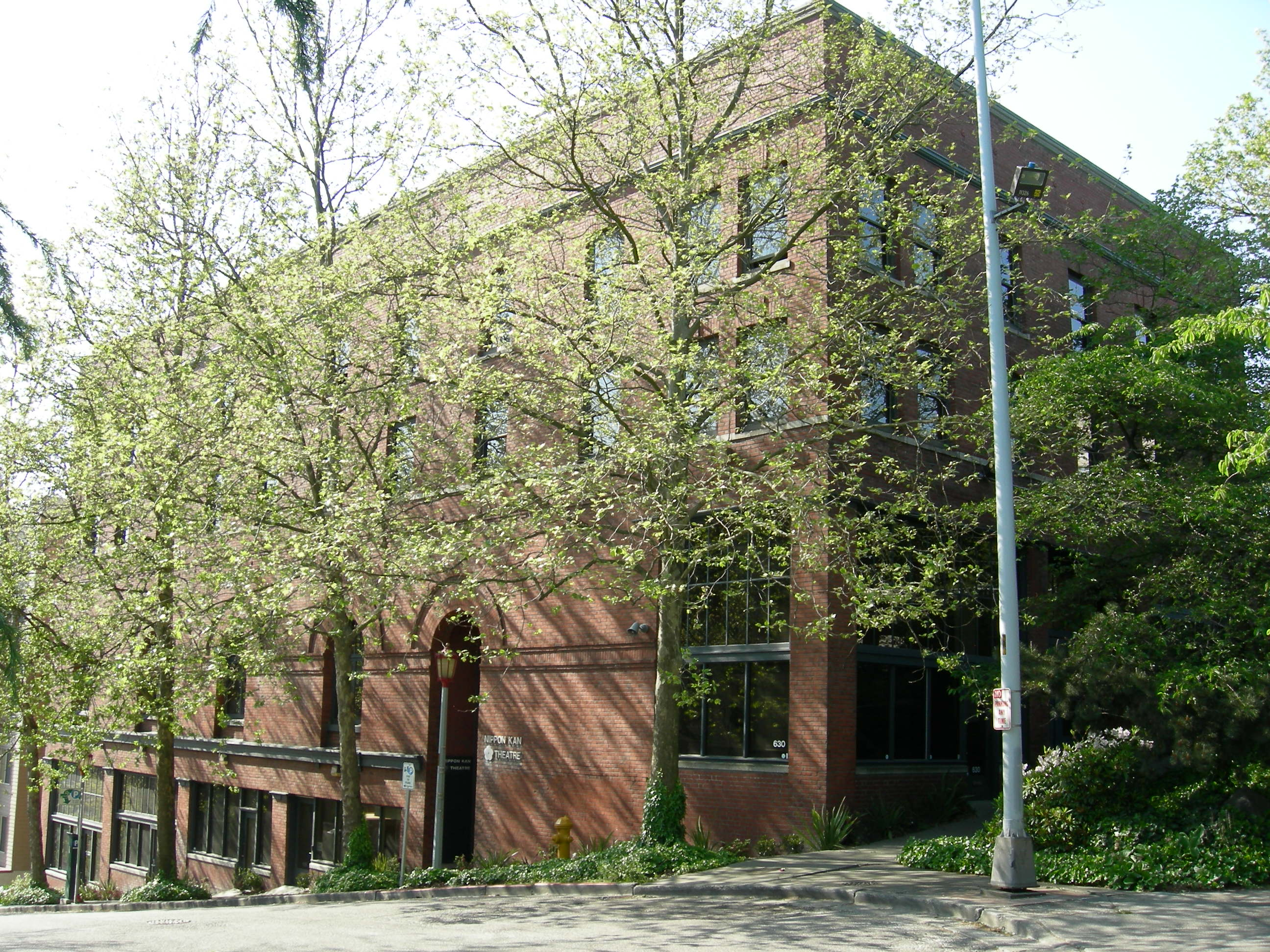
The Nippon Kan

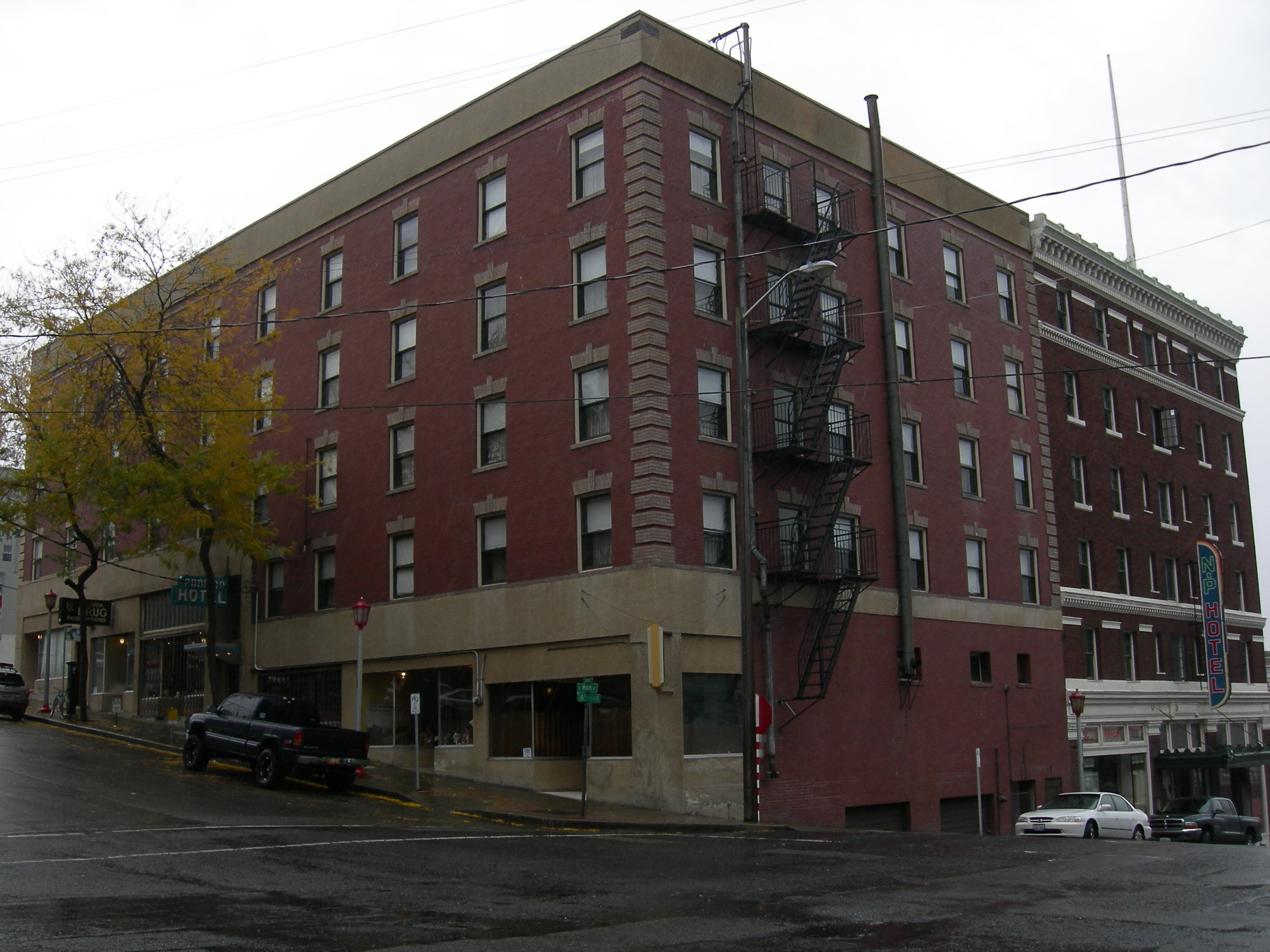
The Panama Hotel

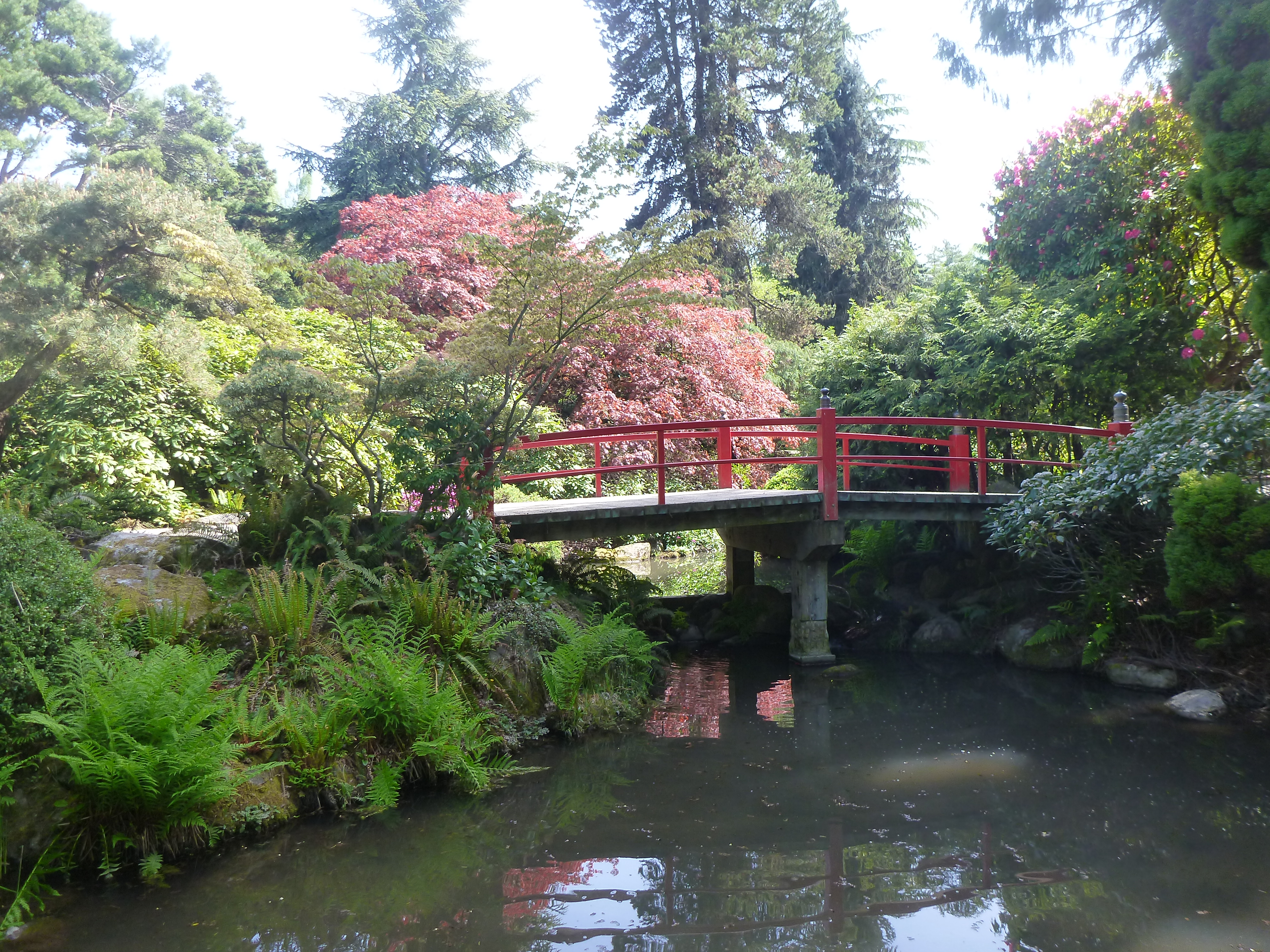
Kubota Garden

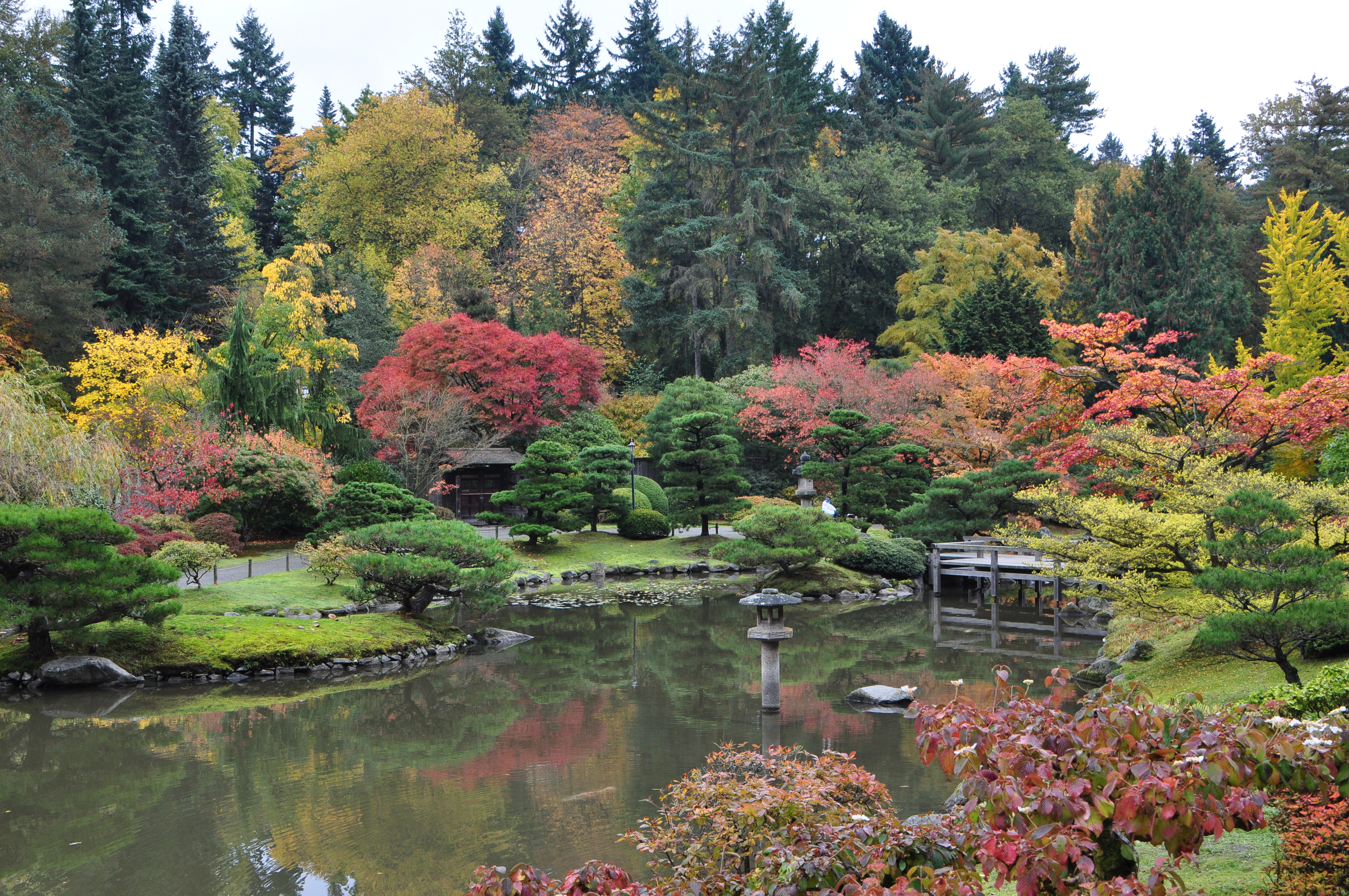
The Seattle Japanese Garden

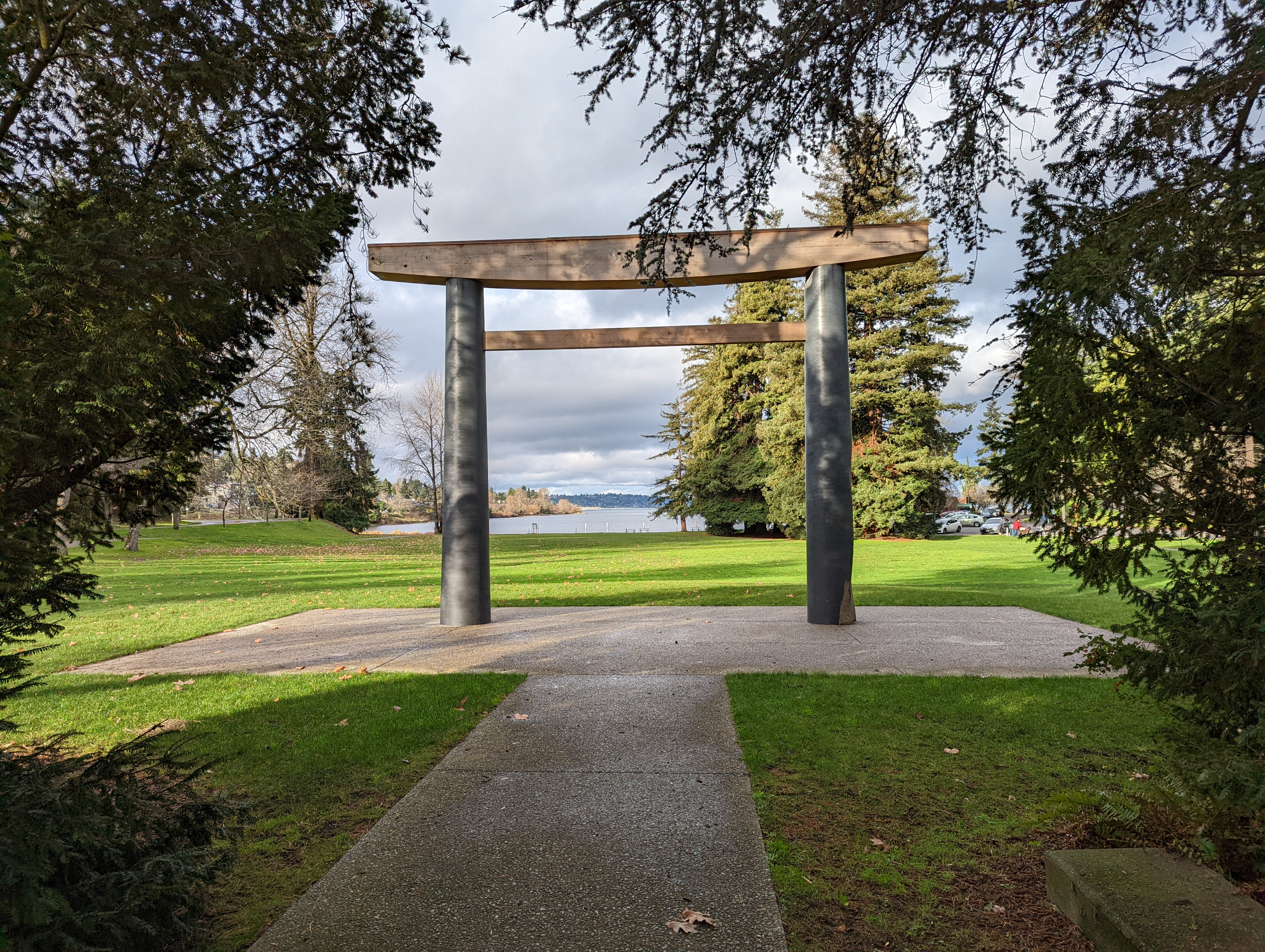
The restored Seward Park Torii

== Religion ==
Built in 1941, the Seattle Betsuin Buddhist Temple (a Jōdo Shinshū temple) replaced an earlier Seattle Buddhist Church building (completed in 1908) that had been torn down as part of the Yesler Terrace project. Other Buddhist temples in the Seattle area include the Japanese Zen Buddhist temple Dai Bai Zan Cho Bo Zen Ji, which opened in 1983.

Tsubaki Grand Shrine of America, the first Shinto shrine built in the mainland United States after World War II, merged with Kannagara Jinja in 2001 and was located in Snohomish County's Granite Falls. It closed in 2023.

== Culture and institutions ==
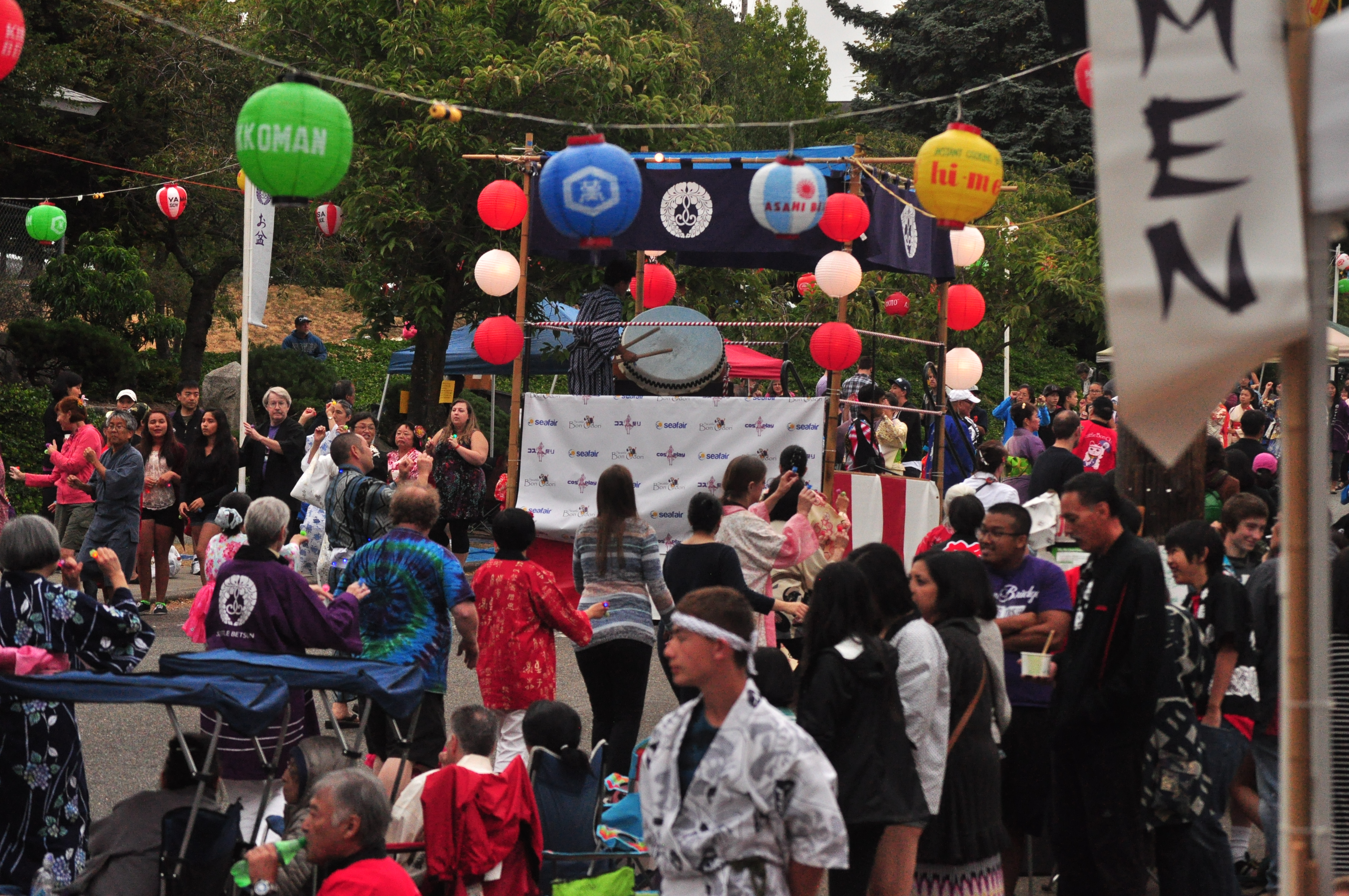
Bon Odori in Seattle

The Japanese American Citizens League, the oldest and largest Asian American civil rights organization in the United States, held its first national conference in 1930 in Seattle.

Founded in 1996, Densho is a nonprofit organization based in Seattle, Washington, which collects video oral histories and documents regarding Japanese American internment in the United States during World War II.

Kip Tokuda, who served as a representative in the Washington State Government, worked to build the Japanese Cultural and Community Center of Washington (JCCCW; ワ州日本文化会館 Wa-shū Nihon Bunka Kaikan) in 2003. The JCCCW dedicated to preserving, promoting and sharing Japanese and Japanese American history, heritage and culture.

The first recorded Bon Odori festival in Seattle was held in 1932. It's an annual event featuring food, cultural displays, and dancing, and is held along the street in front the Seattle Betsuin Buddhist Temple during the summer. Other long running Bon Odori festivals in the Puget Sound region include those held in Tacoma and the White River Valley.

The annual Seattle Cherry Blossom and Japanese Cultural Festival began in 1976 to commemorate the gift of 1,000 cherry trees given to Seattle by Japan's Prime Minister Takeo Miki. Miki had spent some of his student years at the University of Washington in the 1930s.

Since 1984, an annual floating lantern memorial dedicated to the victims of the atomic bombings of Hiroshima and Nagasaki and all other victims of war has been held at Seattle's Green Lake on August 6.

== Geographic distribution ==
According to U.S. Census Bureau estimates, as of the year 2026, 68,477 residents identifying as Japanese resided in the Seattle metro area, accounting for 71.3% of the Japanese population in the state of Washington.

== Notable residents ==
- Kichio Allen Arai (c. 1901–1966), an architect
- Paul Chihara (born 1938), composer
- Masajiro Furuya (1862–1938), a banker, merchant, and manufacturer
- Gordon Hirabayashi (1918–2012), American sociologist, best known for the court case which bears his name, Hirabayashi v. United States.
- Taky Kimura (1924–2021), martial artist
- Kyo Koike (1878–1947), poet, physician, and founder of the Seattle Camera Club
- Fujitaro Kubota (1879–1973), gardener and philanthropist
- Aki Kurose (1925–1998), teacher and social-justice activist
- Mich Matsudaira (1937–2019), a businessman and civil rights activist.
- Lori Matsukawa (born 1956), television news journalist
- Fujimatsu Moriguchi (1898–1962), businessman who founded Uwajimaya
- Tomio Moriguchi (born 1936), businessman and civil rights activist
- Shota Nakajima (born 1989), celebrity chef
- William K. Nakamura (1922–1944), soldier and Medal of Honor recipient
- Rick Noji (born 1967), All-American high-jumper
- Kenjiro Nomura (1896–1956), artist
- Apolo Ohno (born 1982), Olympic gold medalist in short track speed skating
- Frank Okada (1931–2000), artist
- John Okada (1923–1971), author
- Yuji Okumoto (born 1959), actor
- James Sakamoto (1903–1955), pioneering journalist, and one of the founding members of the Japanese American Citizens League
- Bell M. Shimada (1922–1958), fisheries scientist
- Monica Sone (1919–2011), author whose autobiographical memoir describes her life as a Nisei in Seattle during the 1920s and 1930s, and at Minidoka
- Ichiro Suzuki (born 1973), ten time All-Star for the Seattle Mariners
- Kamekichi Tokita (1897–1948), painter and diarist
- Kip Tokuda (1946–2013), Washington State representative
- George Tsutakawa (1910–1997), sculptor and painter
- Kenji Yamada (1924–2014), two-time U.S. National Judo champion
- Donald Yamamoto (born 1953), American diplomat
- Hiro Yamamoto (born 1961), founding member of Soundgarden
- Minoru Yamasaki (1913–1986), architect
- Takuji Yamashita (1874–1959), 1902 University of Washington Law School graduate and civil rights activist

== See also ==
- Japanese Gulch
