= Nihonmachi Alley =

Alley and historic landmark in Seattle, Washington, U.S.

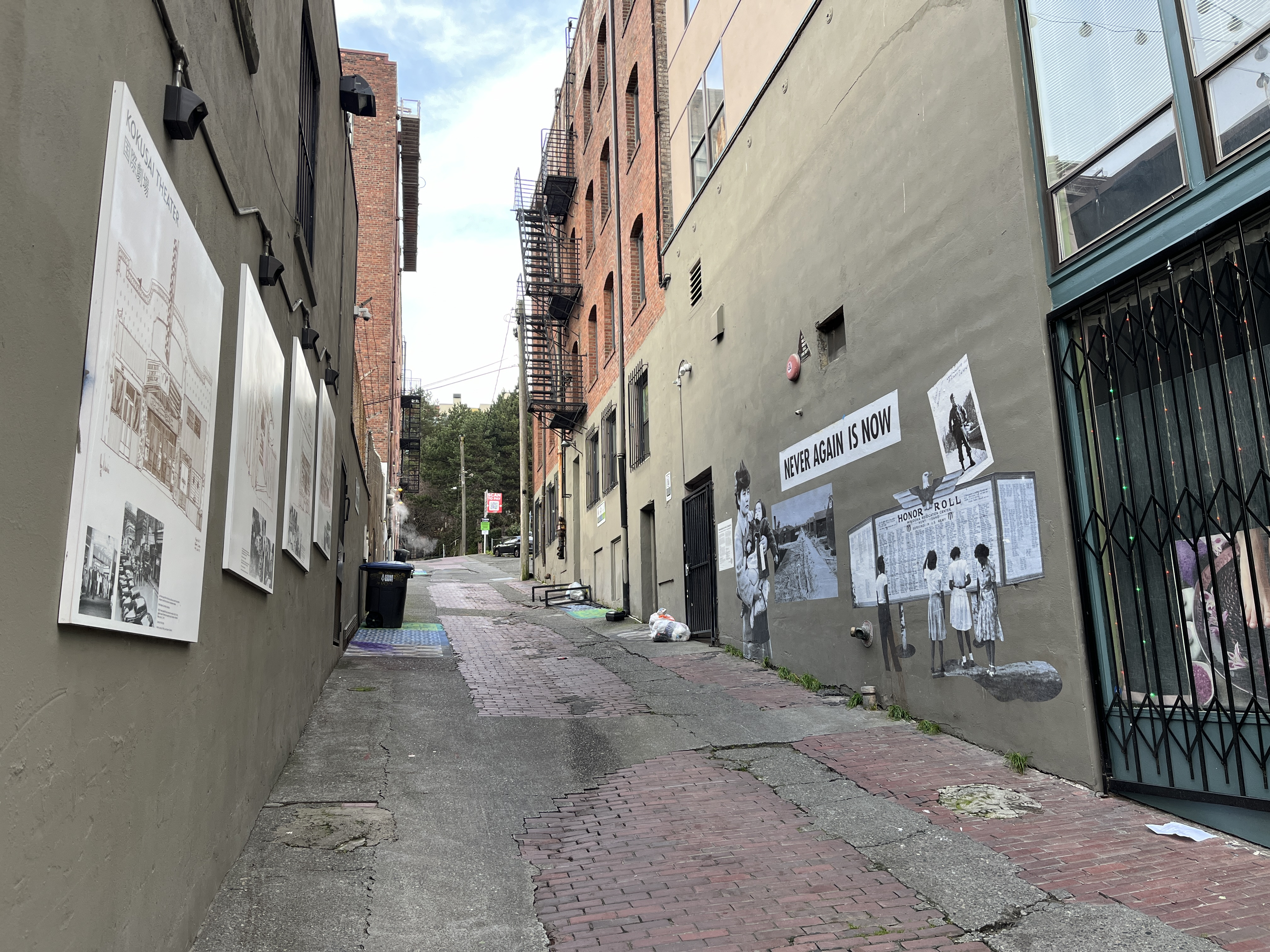
- The alley in 2024

- Location within Downtown Seattle
- Location: Seattle, Washington, United States
- Coordinates: 47.5996°N 122.3257°W

Nihonmachi Alley is an alley and historic landmark in the Japantown part of Seattle's Chinatown–International District, in the U.S. state of Washington.

== Description and history ==
The alley is on the north side of South Jackson Street between Sixth Avenue South and Maynard Avenue South. It has several artworks, including murals and a wheat-pasted work by Erin Shigaki with the text "Never Again is Now." The murals commemorate four businesses that lasted through incarceration: Kokusai Theater, the restaurant Maneki, Sagamiya Confectionery, and the grocery store Uwajimaya.

As of 2024, the alley is slated for decorative gates, lighting, and new paving. Additionally, banners will be installed designating "Historic Nihonmachi/Japantown". Public art in the alley was vandalized twice in 2025.

== See also ==
- History of the Japanese in Seattle
