= Nihon Go Gakko =

Nihon Go Gakko may refer to:

- Nihon Go Gakko (Seattle, Washington), listed on the NRHP in Seattle, Washington
- Nihon Go Gakko (Tacoma, Washington), listed on the NRHP in Tacoma, Washington
- Nihon Go Gakko (Asunción, Paraguay)
