= Japanesepod101.com =

Language course podcast

JapanesePod101.com
- Other names: JPod, JapanesePod
- Genre: Educational; language course; cultural instruction, lifestyle
- Running time: 10–20 minutes (average)
- Country of origin: Japan
- Languages: English; Japanese
- Starring: Peter Galante; Naomi Kambe; Natsuko Kawamoto; Sakura Suzuki; Yuichi Suzuki; Jessi Nuss; Kat Crosbie; Motoko Obata; Risa and many other personalities
- Created by: Peter Galante, Eran Dekel
- Recording studio: Tokyo
- Original release: December 2005 – present
- Audio format: MP3
- Opening theme: Marky Star
- Website: www.japanesepod101.com

JapanesePod101.com is a language course podcast and accompanying website that offers lessons in Japanese. It is part of pod101 websites of Innovative Language Learning USA LLC. The service was founded in 2005 by Peter Galante, Eran Dekel and Aki Yoshikawa.

== Overview ==
Created by Peter Galante in 2005, JapanesePod101.com provides audio and video lessons with accompanying text expansion exercises and other extensive tutoring aids available to paid subscribers or "premium subscribers". It is a product of Innovative Language Learning and is produced in Tokyo, Japan.

== Company ==
JapanesePod101.com's parent company Innovative Language Learning USA LLC is based in New York City, and day-to-day operations and recordings for JapanesePod101.com occur in their Tokyo offices. As of December 2016, Innovative Language Learning operates sites and creates content for 34 languages.

== Content ==
Lessons on JapanesePod101.com come in both audio and video variants, and range in difficulty from absolute beginner to advanced. Paid subscribers also gain access to lesson materials, such as transcriptions, vocabulary lists, and lesson notes.

The learning center hosts a number of other features for paid subscribers such as dictionaries, a flashcard system, and curated lesson collections. In 2014 the company began offering new subscription tiers for personalized tutoring and 1-on-1 Japanese lessons over Skype.

By 2006, the website averaged more than 8,000 downloads of its content per day according to The Japan Times, and has been noted in Newsweek. By September 2015, the company's lessons have been delivered 500,000,000 times across its various languages, this number doubled to 1 billion by August 2018.

In addition to the lessons and learning resources, the website also has a blog, which hosted a series of articles about Japanese characters by writer Eve Kushner. The series concluded in April 2010.

== See also ==
- Japanese language education in the United States
