= Seattle Japanese School =

Supplementary Japanese school in the U.S.

- シアトル日本語補習学校
- School Emblem

Location
- 919 124th Avenue NE, Suite 207; Bellevue, Washington 98005; Administrative office United States; 47.61886°N 122.17541°W

Information
- Type: supplementary Japanese school
- Established: 1971
- Website: seajschool.org

Seattle Japanese School (シアトル日本語補習学校, Shiatoru Nihongo Hoshūgakkō) is a supplementary Japanese school located in the Seattle metropolitan area. It holds its classes in Bellevue.

== History ==
The Seattle Japanese School was founded in 1971 by local businessmen of Japanese descent; by 1993, it had over 600 students and served most of the Puget Sound region.

In 1986 the school moved to Bellevue since most of the students resided in the Eastside of King County, Washington.

== Student body ==
As of 1993 the student body numbered 600, with the majority being children of Japanese citizens on work visas. As of that year some students originated from Tacoma, and others came from Anacortes.

== See also ==
- History of the Japanese in Seattle
- Japanese language education in the United States
