= James Sakamoto =

James Yoshinori Sakamoto (Japanese: 坂本 好徳, March 22, 1903 – December 3, 1955) was a Japanese American journalist, boxer, and community organizer. He established the first English-language Japanese American newspaper, the Japanese American Courier, in 1928, and became a prominent national figure as a founding member of the Japanese American Citizens League.

== Early life ==
Sakamoto was born in Seattle to Osamu and Tsuchi Sakamoto, Issei who had immigrated to the United States from Yamaguchi Prefecture in 1894. He became a star athlete at Franklin High School, leading the football team to its first victory against cross-town rival Broadway High in 1920. That same year, Sakamoto, then 17, testified before the House Committee on Immigration and Naturalization. Preparing for an upcoming revision to U.S. immigration law, the committee had been charged with collecting information on Asian Americans living in the West Coast states — and Sakamoto's testimony that he "wanted to be American more than Japanese" was received favorably.

After finishing high school, he moved to New York, where he found work as editor of the English-language section of the Japanese American News, a position he held for three years. During this time he married Frances Imai, and the couple had one daughter. To supplement his income from the newspaper, Sakamoto began boxing professionally, eventually becoming the first Japanese American to fight in Madison Square Garden. He took on various aliases in order to circumvent legal restrictions on the number of fights a boxer could participate in, and the physical strain soon caused irreparable damage to his retinas. Sakamoto moved back to Seattle when his eyesight began to fade, in 1927; he became completely blind soon after. Frances had died before Sakamoto left New York, and he remarried shortly after returning to Seattle, to a Japanese-born woman named Misao Nishitani (with whom he would have three more daughters).

== Japanese American leader ==
In 1928, Sakamoto and his wife Misao founded the Japanese American Courier, the first Japanese American newspaper to be published entirely in English. Aimed specifically at the American-born Nisei, the Courier reported on Japanese affairs while encouraging its readers to assimilate into "Americanized" society. The Courier was instrumental in promoting and organizing Nisei sporting events, publicizing and encouraging Nisei social groups. Sakamoto would type out the stories on a typewriter, while his wife Misao took charge of the paper's layout and printing, in addition to managing the paper's business operations. By 1940, its readership had grown to 4,275.

Sakamoto helped establish the Japanese American Citizens League in Seattle in 1930, and from 1936 to 1938 he served as the League's national president. The JACL newspaper, the Pacific Citizen, floundered in 1933, and Sakamoto agreed to take over its editing and typesetting, running the national paper in addition to the Courier until 1939. During this time he also created an Asian American sports organization in the Pacific Northwest, named the Courier League after his own newspaper.

== World War II and later years ==
On February 19, 1942 — a little over a month after the Japanese attack on Pearl Harbor — President Franklin D. Roosevelt issued Executive Order 9066, authorizing military commanders to create security zones from which "any or all persons" might be removed. Additional orders created curfews and travel restrictions for Japanese Americans, and plans to "evacuate" all Nikkei from the West Coast were announced soon after. Sakamoto and other core members of the JACL became de facto leaders of the Japanese American community during this time. Sakamoto led the Seattle JACL's Emergency Defense Council, working with government officials, translating regulations and military orders for those who could not read English, and organizing war relief efforts to promote American patriotism. In keeping with the national organization's efforts to present a public face of assimilated, model American citizens, Sakamoto and the Seattle EDC pledged to root out "subversive" agents within the Japanese American community and serve as "protective custodians" over the Issei to prevent them from becoming a threat. In the Courier's final issue, published April 24, 1942, Sakamoto urged Japanese Americans to accept the forced removal without a fight, calling it their "patriotic contribution."

He was removed to the Puyallup Assembly Center (euphemistically dubbed "Camp Harmony" by the Wartime Civilian Control Administration), where army officials allowed the Emergency Defense Council to take charge of much of the administration of the camp. As chief supervisor of the "Japanese staff," Sakamoto and his JACL appointees held a sizeable share of control in the assembly center's day-to-day management — an arrangement that proved unpopular with many Puyallup inmates who viewed the JACL as government collaborators, or "inu" (literally, "dogs"). Sakamoto was transferred to Minidoka in the fall of 1942, but War Relocation Authority restrictions on inmate self-governance in the larger "relocation centers" — combined with growing anti-JACL sentiment — effectively ended his role as a camp leader.

Misao and the couple's two older daughters took advantage of the WRA's resettlement program and left camp for Indiana, while Sakamoto remained in Minidoka to care for their youngest daughter and his elderly parents. After the war, the family returned to Seattle, where, unable to finance a new start for the Japanese American Courier, they lived on government assistance until Sakamoto was able to find a job with the St. Vincent de Paul Salvage Bureau, a Catholic-run charity thrift store. He was struck by a car while walking to work on December 3, 1955, and died later that day.
