= Bush Garden =

Restaurant and karaoke bar in Seattle, Washington, U.S.

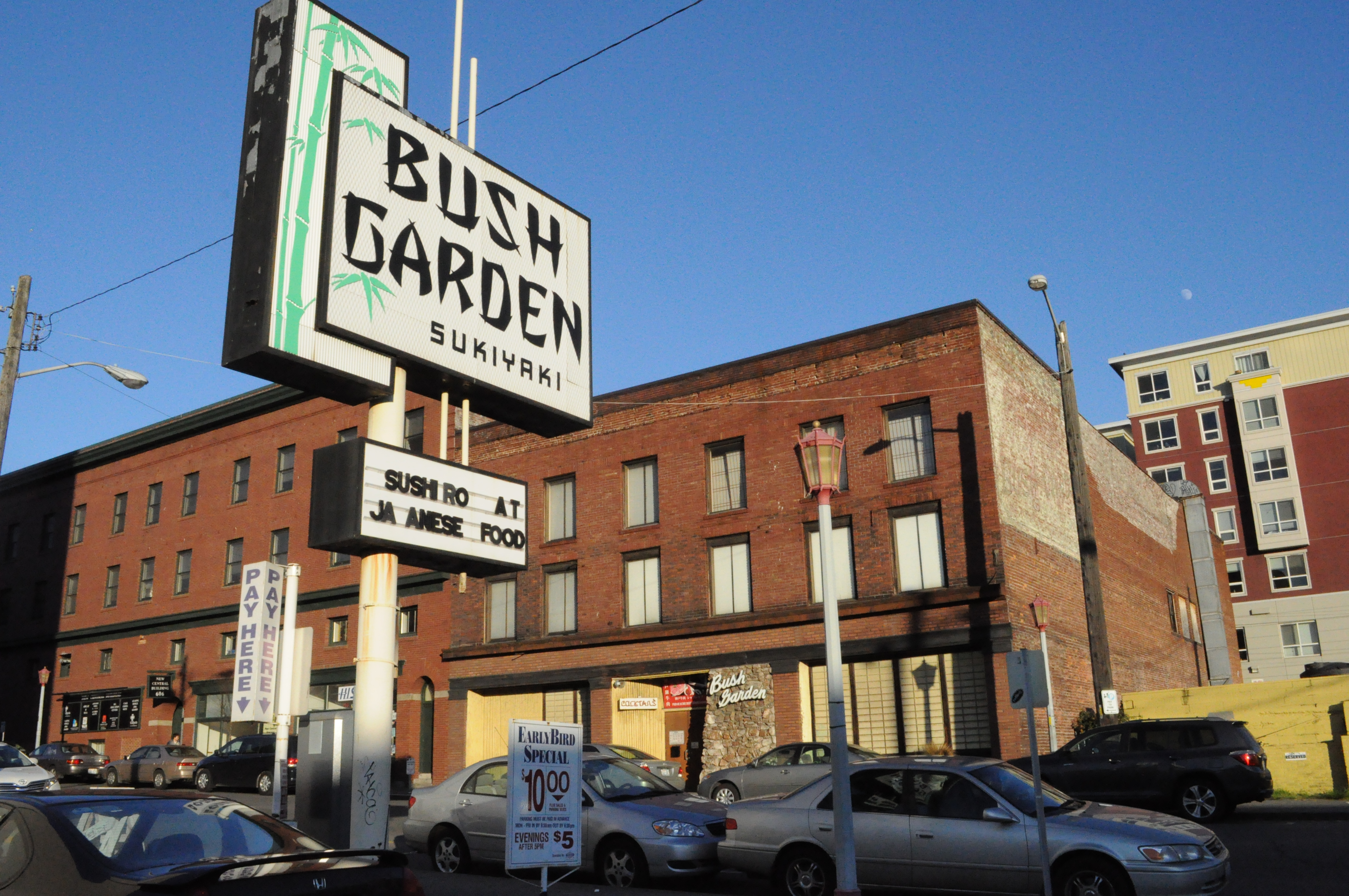
- The restaurant's exterior, 2009
- Interactive map of Bush Garden

Restaurant information
- Established: 1953
- Location: Seattle, Washington, United States
- Coordinates: 47.5985°N 122.3229°W

Bush Garden is a restaurant and karaoke bar on Maynard Avenue South in Seattle's Chinatown–International District, Seattle, in the U.S. state of Washington.

== History ==
Bush Garden opened as a Japanese restaurant in 1953. It was once considered a destination dining establishment, attracting visits from celebrities and politicians as well as locals.

During the 1950s, its owners introduced tatami rooms in which diners could eat at floor level, but with a hidden pit where diners could extend their legs (a now not uncommon feature). In the 1970s, the restaurant became home to perhaps the first karaoke bar in the U.S., though a similar claim was made for Maneki (another Japanese restaurant in Seattle).

Bush Garden closed in 2020, during the COVID-19 pandemic, but reopened in 2026 at a new location at Seattle's Eighth Avenue South and South King Street.

== Reception ==
Thrillist says, "It may not be quite as entertaining as Busch Gardens, but this place is still pretty fun thanks to sing-a-longs that basically never stop, cheap Asian takes on bar eats, and stunningly stiff and inexpensive drinks."

== See also ==
- List of Japanese restaurants
