= Nihongo Gakko (Tacoma) =

- Nihon Go Gakko
- U.S. National Register of Historic Places
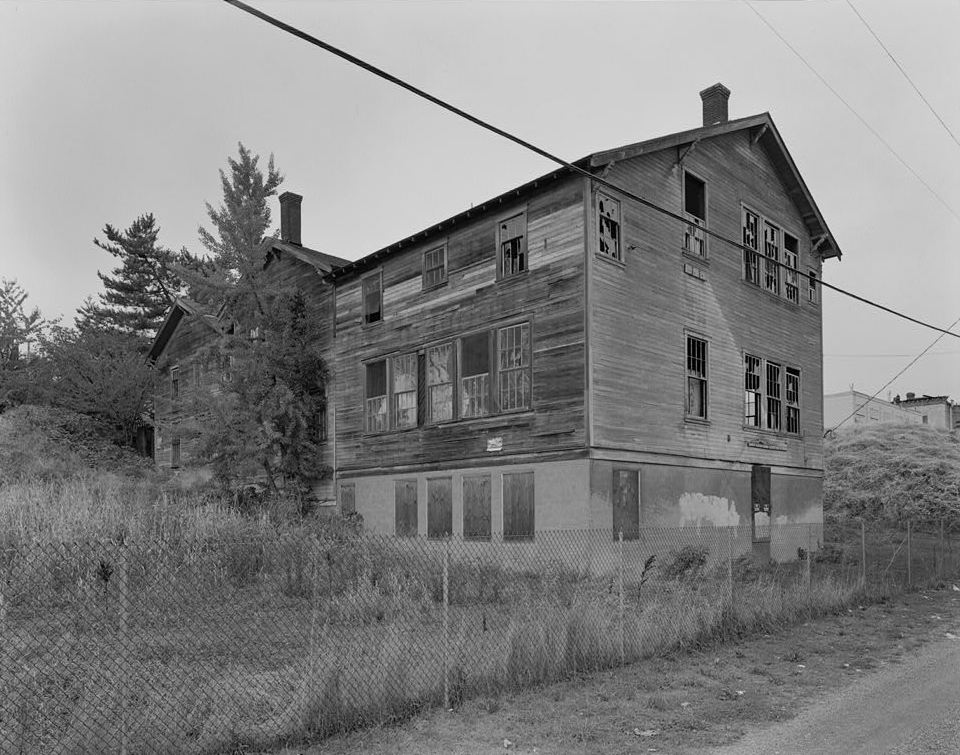
- Nihon Go Gakko before it was demolished

- Location within Washington (state)
- Location: Tacoma, Washington
- Coordinates: 47°14′52.26″N 122°26′29.63″W
- Built: 1922
- Architect: Heath & Gove
- NRHP reference No.: 84003568
- Added to NRHP: August 30, 1984

The Nihon Go Gakko (日本語学校, Nihongo gakkō; literally, Japanese Language School) alternately, Nihon Gogakko, in what was then Tacoma, Washington's Japantown, was one of 24 Japanese language schools that existed in Washington prior to World War II.

== History ==
The building was built in 1922 to replace a smaller building and accommodate a larger enrollment. It was designed by Frederick Heath of Heath, Gove and Bell. Because Washington had laws preventing aliens from owning land, the lot was paid for by a school corporation that was made up of three Americans, and two Issei Japanese Americans. Two lots were bought for a total cost of $1,600, and the building was built at a cost of $9,000. An addition to the building was added in 1926. The school taught classes on the English language, the Japanese language, and Japanese culture.

During World War II the building was used to gather Japanese residents during World War II, before sending them to internment camps.

The University of Washington bought the building in 1993 after it established a campus in Tacoma. By this point, the decades of vacancy had left the building quite dilapidated. The same year, the university had made a request to the Tacoma Landmarks Preservation Commission for permission to demolish the building and replace it with a commemorative garden, but failed to act on their approval. In 2001, the City of Tacoma told the university that the building was a safety hazard and the following year the Preservation Commission renewed their approval of the plan for demolition. The university received an estimate of $3 million to rehabilitate the building, and decided that the cost was not feasible.

Despite being listed on the National Register of Historic Places, as well as being a City of Tacoma Landmark, the building was demolished in 2004 after having stood vacant since the 1940s. Prior to its demolition, the school was one of only two Japanese language schools left, of around four dozen that existed in the Western United States and Hawaii.

A memorial sculpture and interpretive plaque, describing the school's history and its principal Masato Yamasaki, was unveiled in 2014 on the University of Washington Tacoma campus.

== See also ==
- Japanese language education in the United States
- History of the Japanese in Seattle

== Sources ==
- Asato, Noriko (2006). Teaching Mikadoism: The Attack on Japanese Language Schools in Hawaii, California, and Washington, 1919-1927, Honolulu: University of Hawaii Press, ISBN 0-8248-2898-4.
- Magden, Ronald E. (1998). Furusato: Tacoma-Pierce County Japanese 1888-1988, Nikkeijinkai: Tacoma Japanese Community Service.
- Sandercock, Leonie (1998). Making the Invisible Visible: A Multicultural Planning History, University of California Press, ISBN 0-520-20735-1.
