= Nihon Go Gakko (Seattle) =

Japanese language school in Seattle; historic site

- シアトル日本語学校
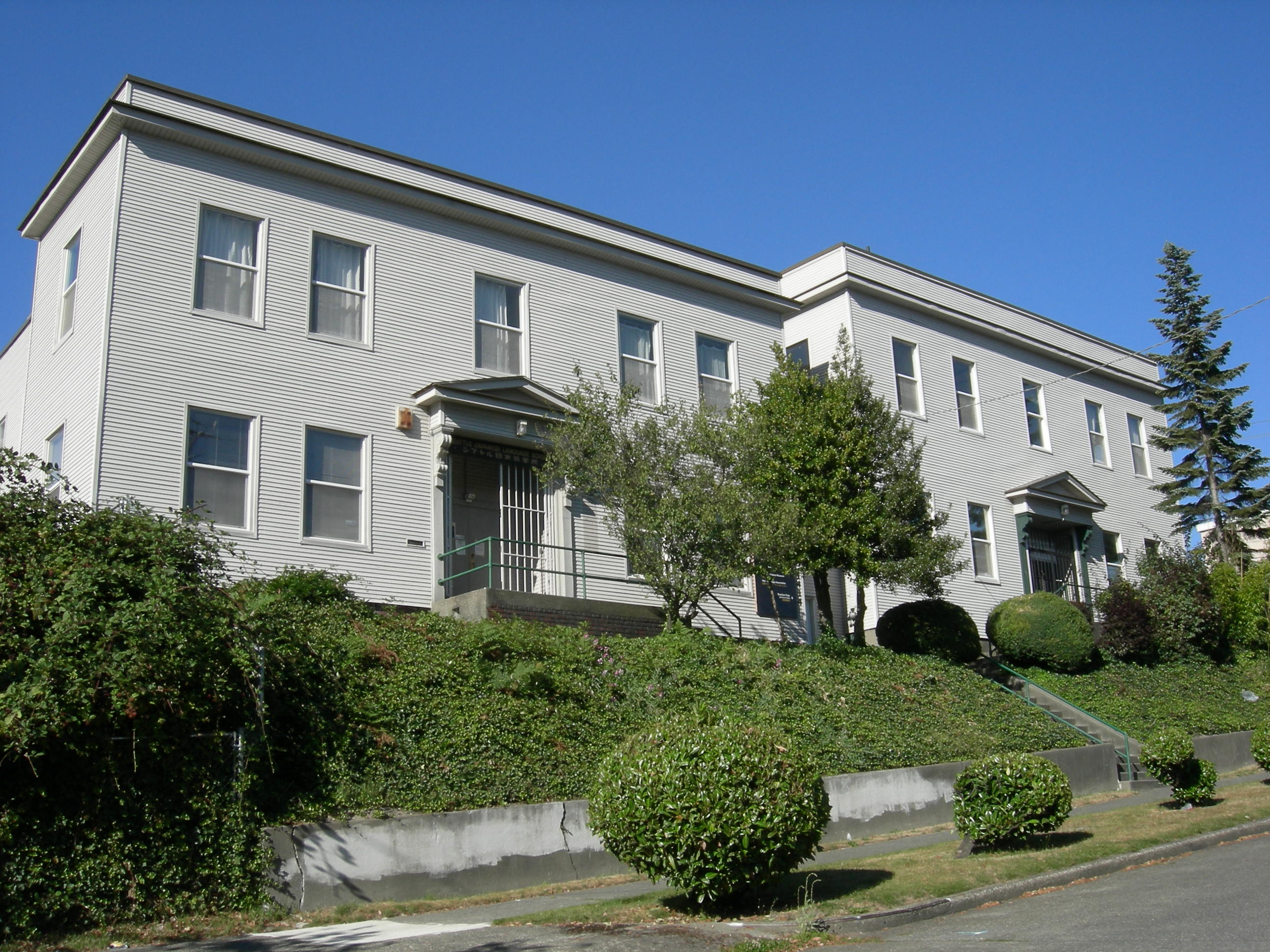
- The front of the Japanese Cultural and Community Center Complex, formerly the Nihon Go Gakko.

Location
- Location in Seattle
- 1414 South Weller Street; Seattle, Washington, 98144; United States; 47°35′53″N 122°18′38″W

Information
- Other name: Seattle Japanese Language School
- Former name: Kokugo Gakkō (国語学校)
- Established: 1902
- Affiliation: Japanese Cultural & Community Center of Washington
- Website: www.jcccw.org/classes/japanese-language-school

Nihon Go Gakko (シアトル日本語学校, Shiatoru Nihongo Gakko), also known as the Japanese Language School (JLS), is a Japanese language education center in Seattle, Washington, United States. It is based at the Japanese Cultural and Community Center of Washington, on the periphery of the Seattle International District in a historic building listed on the National Register of Historic Places. The JLS provides Japanese language classes to both children and adults. Originally known as Kokugo Gakko, it is also the oldest Japanese language school in North America.

Since the combination of the Nikkei Heritage Association of Washington and the JLS in 2003 to form the Japanese Cultural and Community of Washington (JCCCW), a 501(c)3 nonprofit, the JLS has become its premier program.

== History ==
Established in 1902 on the second floor of the Furuya Company building in Seattle's Pioneer Square–Skid Road Historic District, the first class of the Japanese school was headed by Yoshio Shibayama with a class of four students. By 1907 there were a total of 48 students. In 1913, the school moved to its current location at Weller and 16th Street. An extension to the building was completed in 1918, funded by donations from the Seattle Japanese community.

By 1920, the school had grown to seven teachers and 251 students. In 1930, there were 24 teachers and more than 1,000 students. In 1938 the school opened its doors to adults, offering evening classes. At its peak, nearly 2,000 students attended the school, spending two hours there a day, five days a week following regular schooling.

When World War II broke out and the Japanese Americans in the area were sent to internment camps, the U.S. military occupied the school for use as an Army Air Force training facility. After World War II ended and interned Japanese Americans began to return to the Seattle area, the school was re-purposed as hostel and would house many returnee Japanese Americans as they looked for new homes and occupations. It was often referred to as the "Hunt Hotel", since many returnees had been incarcerated at the Minidoka internment camp in the Hunt, Idaho area. More than 130 people lived in the building's classrooms over a period of almost 15 years, as they attempted to rebuild their lives.

Today, the Nihon Go Gakko is home to the Japanese Cultural and Community Center of Washington which was the combination of the Nikkei Heritage Association of Washington (NHAW) and the JLS. The JLS is used by the JCCCW to promote Japanese language and culture.

== See also ==
- History of the Japanese in Seattle
