= Camp Harmony =

Japanese-American internment camp

Coordinates: 47°10′58″N 122°17′43″W

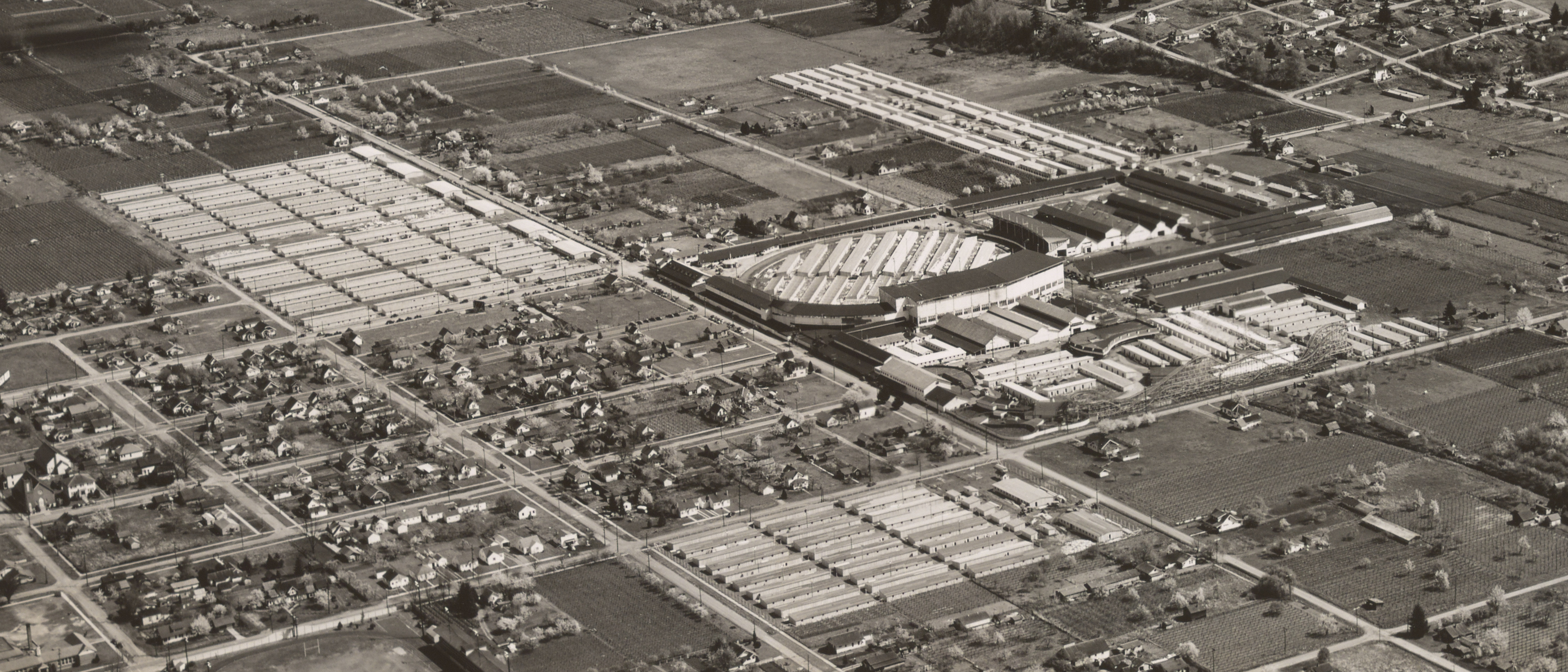
- Aerial view of Camp Harmony in April 1942
- Interactive map of Camp Harmony

History
- Built: May 1942

Camp Harmony is the unofficial euphemistic name of the Puyallup Assembly Center, a temporary facility within the system of concentration camps set up for Japanese Americans during World War II. Approximately 7,390 Americans of Japanese descent from Western Washington and Alaska were sent to the camp (nearly doubling the town of Puyallup's population of 7,500) before being transferred to the War Relocation Authority camps at Minidoka, Idaho, Tule Lake, California and Heart Mountain, Wyoming.

== World War II ==
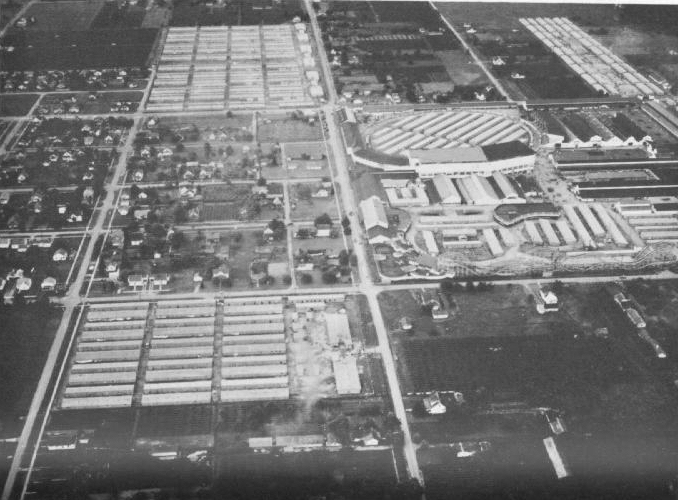
Puyallup Assembly Center, 1942

Camp Harmony was established in May 1942, shortly after the attack on Pearl Harbor and President Franklin D. Roosevelt's subsequent Executive Order 9066, which authorized the eviction of Japanese Americans from the West Coast. The location for the assembly center was on and around the Western Washington Fairgrounds in Puyallup, Washington. It consisted of four distinct areas:

- A, with a population of about 2000, located northeast of the fairgrounds.
- B, with a population of about 1200, just east of the fairgrounds in the vicinity of the current Blue parking lot.
- C, with a population of about 800, located northwest of the fairgrounds.
- D, with a population of about 3000, located on the fairgrounds proper in the area including the racetrack and grandstand, east of the roller coaster.

The barracks "apartments" were designed to allow 50 square feet of space per individual, with one small window, a single electrical socket and a wood stove. Each area contained several mess halls, laundry facilities and latrines. A 100-bed hospital was built in Area D, and existing facilities were used as administration offices and community centers.

In May and June 1942, just under 100 Japanese Americans left Camp Harmony to find work or attend school outside the exclusion zone, or to repatriate to Japan. On May 26, 196 men volunteered for an early transfer to Tule Lake to help finish construction on the camp there. The majority of the internees made the 30-hour train trip to Minidoka in 16 groups of approximately 500, beginning on August 12. The last train left the Puyallup station on September 12, and on September 30, 1942, the site was handed over to the Fort Lewis Ninth Service Command. The Puyallup Fairgrounds were then occupied by the U.S. Army 943rd Signal Service Battalion until they were transferred to Fort Lewis, Washington in December. The Puyallup Fairgrounds remained closed to the public until the end of the war, operating as an army training facility.

After the Assembly Center closed the U.S. Army 943rd Signal Service Battalion were station at the camp for training before departing.

== Post-war ==
The first postwar fair took place in September 1946. On November 25, 1978, the first Day of Remembrance was held at the Western Washington Fairgrounds, and over 2,000 attended. Five years later, on August 21, 1983, Governor John Spellman and Washington state representatives dedicated a sculpture by George Tsutakawa as a memorial to those confined at the wartime detention site.

In 2024, a permanent exhibit called the "Remembrance Gallery" opened beneath the grandstands at the Washington State Fairgrounds. It contains a memorial wall with names of Camp Harmony incarcerees, an informational display, and a replica of a Camp Harmony barrack.

== See also ==
- Bibliography of the Japanese American Internment during World War II
- Outline of Japanese American Internment during World War II
- History of the Japanese in Seattle
