= Maneki =

Japanese restaurant in Seattle, Washington, U.S.

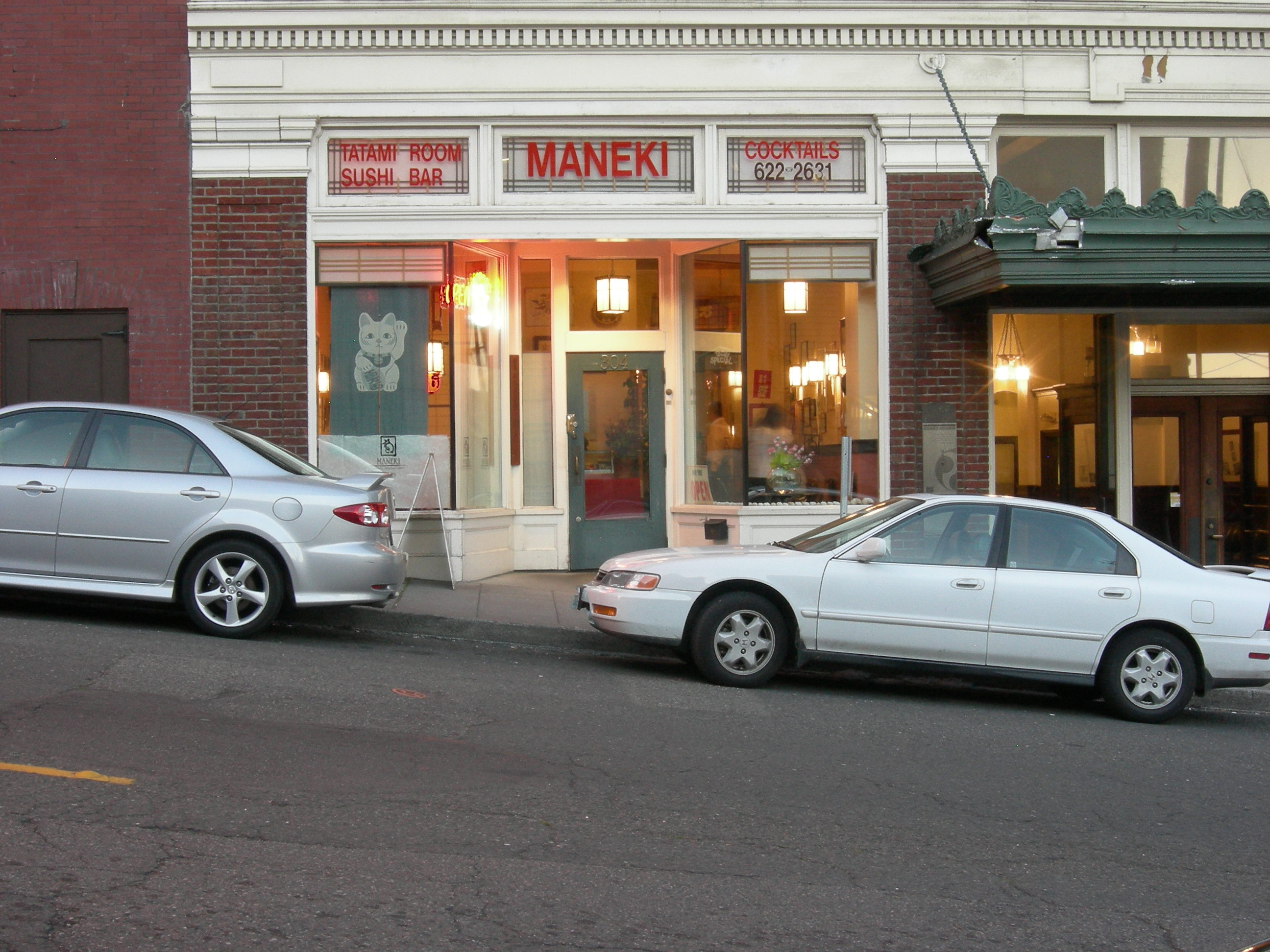
- Interactive map of Maneki

Restaurant information
- Established: 1904
- Owners: Jean Nakayama, InterIm CDA
- Previous owners: Tokuji Sato; "Shi-chan" Virginia Ichikawa; Joe Ichikawa; Kozo Nakayama
- Food type: Japanese
- Location: 304 6th Ave S, Seattle, King County, Washington State, 98104, United States
- Coordinates: 47°35′59.2″N 122°19′34.4″W
- Website: manekiseattle.com

Maneki is a Japanese restaurant in the Japantown area of the International District in Seattle, Washington that opened in 1904 as the first sushi bar in the city. Some claim it is the oldest Asian restaurant on the West Coast of the United States, and it is recognized as one of the oldest sushi restaurants in the United States.

== History ==
The restaurant is named after the Maneki-neko. When the restaurant first opened in 1904, it was shaped like a Japanese castle and employees wore kimono. The space could seat up to five hundred customers. Tokuji Sato purchased the restaurant in 1923. Among its early employees, future Japanese prime minister Takeo Miki worked there while supporting himself as a student.

After the Attack on Pearl Harbor during World War II, President Franklin D. Roosevelt signed Executive Order 9066, which resulted in the internment of Japanese Americans. Since each family was only allowed to take one suitcase of belongings, much of the restaurant was moved to storage during this time. The original, castle-like building was looted and vandalized during the war. After returning from the internment camps, the Sato family reopened the restaurant in its current location, which was the storage unit for the original restaurant during the war.

In the early 1960s, Sato handed ownership over to his daughter, "Shi-chan" Virginia Ichikawa, and her husband Joe. In 1960, Fusae Yokoyama began working at the restaurant as a bartender. Over the years, Yokoyama became known as "Mom" by employees and regular customers. In 1978, the Nakayama family purchased the restaurant. In 1998, owner Kozo Nakayama died and left the restaurant to his wife, Jean Nakayama. Jean Nakayama began eating at the restaurant with her family when she was eight years old. Officially, the restaurant is now owned by InterIm CDA, an organization dedicated to the preservation of Seattle's International District.

During the COVID-19 pandemic, Maneki saw a 70 to 80 percent reduction in business and stopped serving raw fish. The restaurant relied primarily on takeout and started its first website. When the restaurant was struggling to stay open, patrons donated funds through a GoFundMe page to keep the restaurant open. In 2021, the restaurant was chosen to receive a $45,000 make-over from Puget Sound Energy to improve the restaurant's energy efficiency. The restaurant also received a grant from the National Trust for Historic Preservation.

== Reception ==
- James Beard Award, 2008

Maneki was included in The Infatuation's 2025 list of the 25 best restaurants in the Chinatown–International District.

== See also ==
- History of the Japanese in Seattle
- List of James Beard America's Classics
