= Masajiro Furuya =

Japanese-American banker (1862–1938)

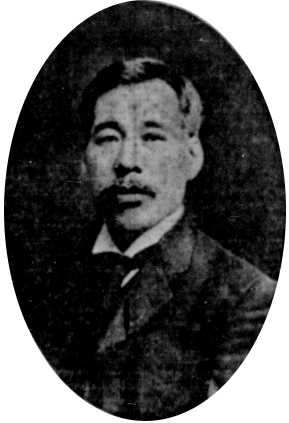
Furuya, circa 1909

Masajiro Furuya (古屋政次郎, November 7, 1862—February 15, 1938; sometimes written as Masahiro Furuya), founder of the Furuya Company, was a Japanese American banker, merchant, and manufacturer, whose career took place largely in Seattle, Washington, United States. Gary Iwamoto described him in 2005 as "perhaps the most prominent local [Seattle] businessman of the early 20th Century" and "certainly the top businessman among Japanese on the Pacific Coast" during that period.

== Early years in Japan ==
Furuya was born in 1862 in Yamanashi Prefecture, Japan, the son of Heibei and T. Ariidzumi Furuya. His mother died when he was still a child. At 13 he apprenticed at a confectionery, but eventually entered a private school. He received a teacher's credential at 21 and entered the Imperial Japanese Army at 22. He served three years at the Azabu First Infantry Regiment in Tokyo. By the time he left the military he had formed an ambition to emigrate to the North America.

== Early years in North America ==
To avoid ending up a laborer in America, he apprenticed again, this time as a tailor. Three years later, at the age of 28, he landed in Vancouver, British Columbia, soon heading south into the United States. over the next year or two, he worked in Seattle, Chicago, St. Louis, variously tailoring and working in grocery stores, before returning to Seattle in December 1892, where he opened a grocery store and tailor shop at 303 Yesler Way.

Furuya traveled to Japan in 1903 to get married. He and his wife Hatsu Shibata returned to Seattle. They had two daughters, both of whom attended Seattle public schools.

== Furuya Company ==
He proved an able merchant, and his Furuya Company made profits in trade related to the Sino-Japanese War and Klondike Gold Rush, and gained many customers in Seattle's growing Japanese community: this was the period in which the N.Y.K. line (now Nippon Yusen) began direct steamship service between Seattle and Yokohama. Seattle's Japanese population grew from 125 in 1890 to 2,884 in 1900. His blue-suited "Furuya men" traveled the west, taking orders for goods from Japanese laborers throughout the region. His business came to involve wholesale, retail, and import-export. Besides being a major supplier of Japanese foodstuffs in the region, he opened an Oriental fine arts store in 1895, which eventually came to be located at 1304 Second Avenue (today, part of the site of Benaroya Hall, Seattle's symphony hall), and started the Furuya Construction Company, mainly a labor contractor, which helped build the Great Northern Railway, the Milwaukee Road and the Oregon Short Line.

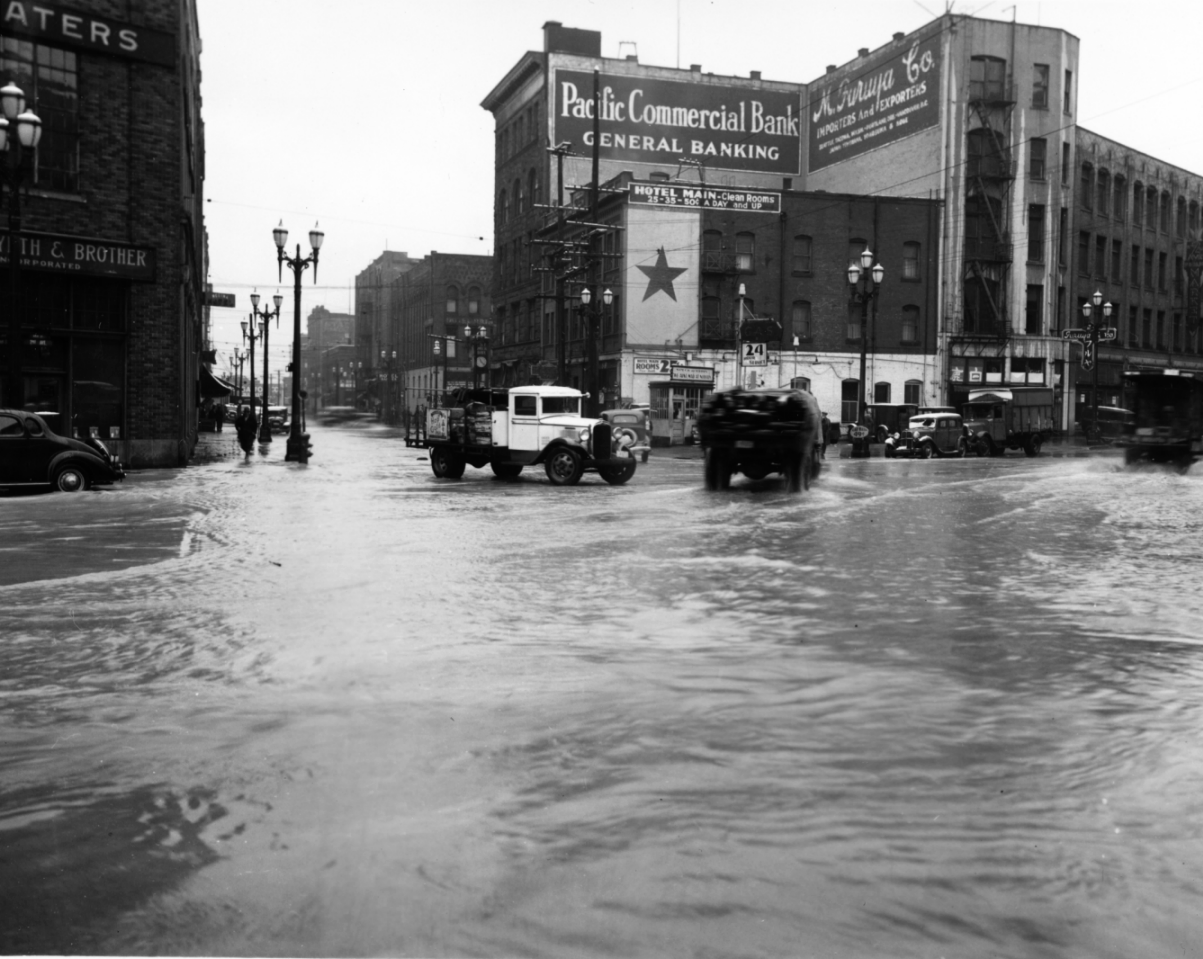
The rear of the Furuya Building at 216 South Second Avenue features prominently in this 1936 photo of flooded streets in Seattle's Pioneer Square—Skid Road neighborhood.

In 1900, a headquarters was built to his specifications at 216 South Second Avenue, mainly for his grocery and Japanese art products business, and became a focal point of Seattle's then-thriving Nihonmachi or Japantown. Furuya reinforced his role as a leader of the Japanese community by purchasing the Nippon Kan (Japanese Hall) and as a key supporter of Japanese-American efforts at the Alaska-Yukon-Pacific Exposition. The company also engaged in real estate, postal service, banking, and printing, and sold rice to the Imperial Japanese Navy.

At its height the Furuya Company had North American branch offices in Portland, Oregon (established 1895), Tacoma, Washington (established 1900), and Vancouver, B.C. (established 1904), as well as Japanese branch offices in Yokohama (established 1898), Kobe (established 1903), Yokosuka, and a sub-branch in Tokyo. It was the most important career opportunity for skilled and educated Japanese and Japanese Americans in Seattle, because white-owned companies would generally not hire them except as laborers. Still, Furuya worked his employees hard and wages were low; 10- to 12-hour shifts and 7-day weeks were routine, the day started with a Christian "inspirational meeting," and he reportedly required his employees to attend Sunday school at the church he belonged to, Seattle First Methodist. There were no vacations except a once-a-year company outing to the gardens of Furuya's summer house, the Furuya Resort House at Crystal Springs on Bainbridge Island, overlooking Port Orchard on Puget Sound.

Despite his austere lifestyle and strong Christian beliefs, Ronald Takaki writes that Furuya's fortune may have had significant roots in the underground economy of Seattle's Skid Road. Takaki describes it as "the accepted opinion among the Seattle community" that beginning in his days as a tailor Furuya functioned as a trusted banker for Seattle prostitutes. "[S]ome of them may have died or moved away… without requesting the money back. As a result, Furuya, they say, made big money out of it."

== Furuya Resort House ==
The Furuya Resort House was built on a 6 acres (2.4 ha) property that included 300 feet (91 m) of the Bainbridge Island shore. The grounds had two stone lanterns, a pond and bridge, a large greenhouse and eight hothouses, with 5,000 pots of lilies, cucumbers, tomatoes, lettuce, geraniums, and chrysanthemums. He experimented with bamboos and was probably the first to import udo (Aralia cordata) and certain types of soybeans used in making soy sauce. He had paulownias, maples, wisteria, Japanese cypress, and cryptomeria shipped from Japan. Besides the annual visit by his employees, it was open on Sundays for picnics by University of Washington students and local prefectural associations (associations of people tracing their ancestry to a particular Japanese prefecture). The house survives, as do many of the plants, although the paulownias are gone. The Whitman family, owners of the house since the late 1970s, continue to host an annual Japanese Community Picnic.

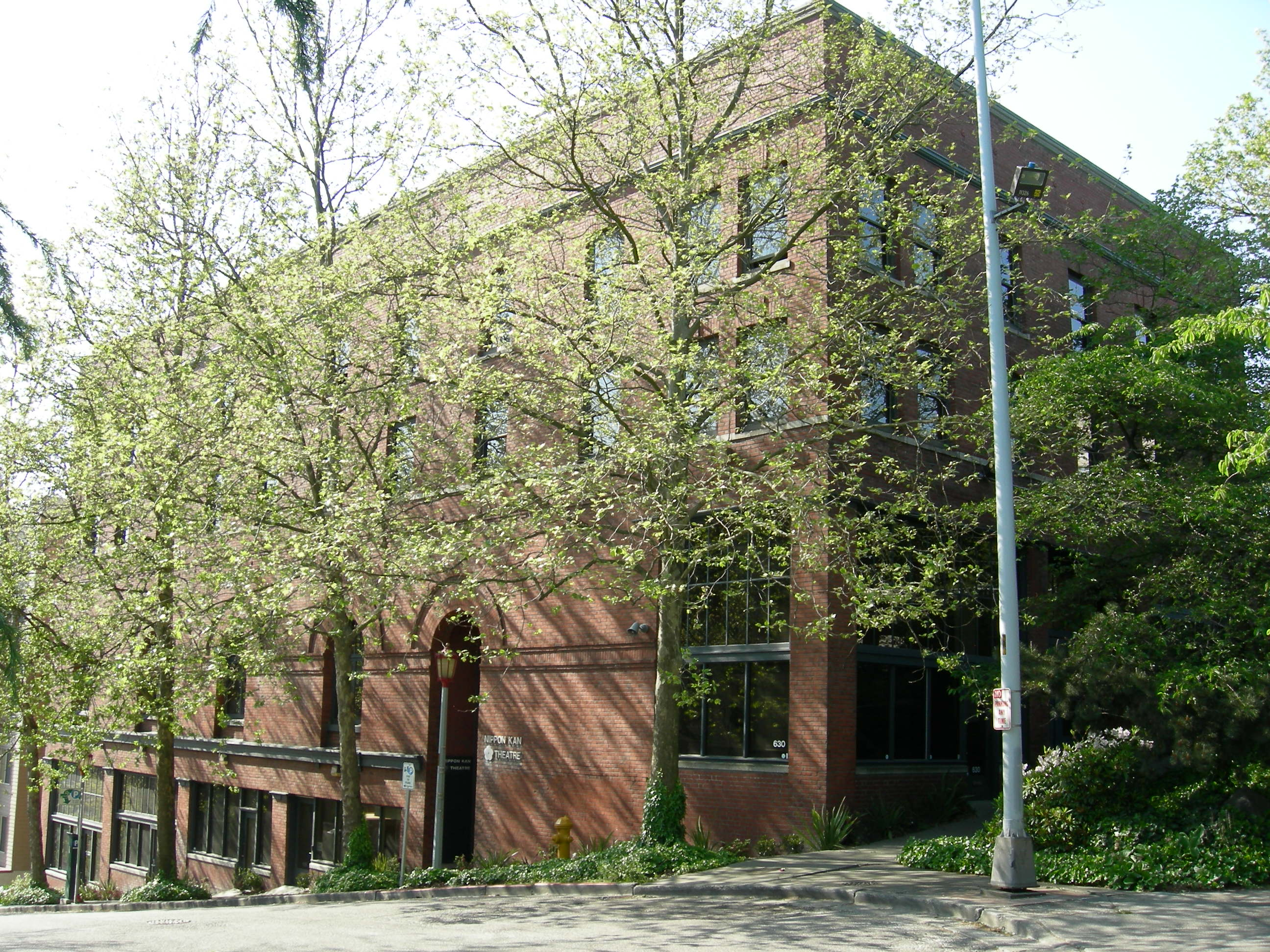
The Nippon Kan Building, built 1909–1910, depicted here in 2007.

The summer house may have been Furuya's only personal extravagance. Most of the year he and his family lived on the upper floor of the company boarding house and he ate a simple, largely traditional Japanese diet. Even the summer house with its commanding view, surrounded on three sides by a verandah, was quite modest on the inside. The interior of the second floor was never finished or used.

== Banking ==
Building on his success as a merchant, Furuya became a banker. He founded the Japanese Commercial Bank in 1907; it became the cornerstone of a banking empire that eventually consolidated the Oriental American Bank, and the Seattle Specie Bank in 1928 under his Pacific Commercial Bank and Pacific Holding Company. His role as a merchant and banker allowed him entree into circles not usually open to Japanese Americans. He was a member of the Seattle Chamber of Commerce, an honorary member of the United States Chamber of Commerce, was praised in Clarence Bagley's History of Seattle (1916) as "a man of unusual business ability and keen insight," and was listed in Who’s Who in Washington State in 1927.

However, the Great Depression and mismanagement of the Seattle Specie Bank turned him from a millionaire to bankrupt. Like many Japanese American (and other American) bankers of the time, he had overextended, invested in stocks that plummeted, and made unsecured loans. He sought but failed to obtain a rescue from the Sumitomo Bank and the Yokohama Specie Bank. This was before the time of deposit insurance in the United States, and Furuya's failure was an economic disaster for Seattle's Japanese community, leading to the failure of many businesses along Seattle's Main Street.

The First National Bank (later Seafirst Bank, eventually absorbed by Bank of America) saw opportunity in the financial void left by Furuya's collapse, and started its "International Branch" on Jackson Street April 10, 1934. The Bank of America Branch at Sixth and Jackson in what is today known as Chinatown-International District is a direct descendant of that branch.

== Later years ==
Furuya moved to Southern California in 1931 and tried unsuccessfully to reestablish himself, finally returning, ill, to Japan in July 1937. He died in Yokohama on February 15, 1938 from atrophic kidney disease.
