= Japanese language education in the United States =

Language education

Japanese language education in the United States began in the late 19th century, aimed mainly at Japanese American children and conducted by parents and community institutions. Over the course of the next century, it would slowly expand to include non-Japanese as well as native speakers (mainly children of Japanese expatriates being educated in international schools). A 2012 survey of foreign-language learners by the Japan Foundation found 4,270 teachers teaching the Japanese language to 155,939 students at 1,449 different institutions, an increase of 10.4% in the number of students since the 2009 survey. The quality and focus of dialogues in Japanese textbooks meant for English-speakers has changed since the 1970s. As of 2024, according to the Japan Foundation, 134,096 people were learning Japanese in United States.

== History ==
=== Origins ===
The earliest Japanese language instruction in the United States was aimed at heritage speakers. Japanese immigration to Hawaii began in 1868, and to the United States in 1869. Issei parents, worrying about the increasing Americanization of their nisei children, established Japanese schools outside of the regular school system to teach the language and culture of their ancestral country. The first school was established in Kohala, Hawaii by Reverend Shigefusa Kanda, in 1893, and others soon followed, including several attached to Hawaiian Hongwanji missions. The schools were financed by both the Japanese immigrant community and the sugar planters they worked for, as they provided much needed childcare for the plantation laborers during their long workday. By 1920, the schools enrolled 98% of all Japanese American children in Hawaii. Statistics for 1934 showed 183 schools teaching a total of 41,192 students.

On the mainland, California's first Japanese language school was Nihongo Gakuin, established in 1903; by 1912, eighteen such schools had been set up in California alone.

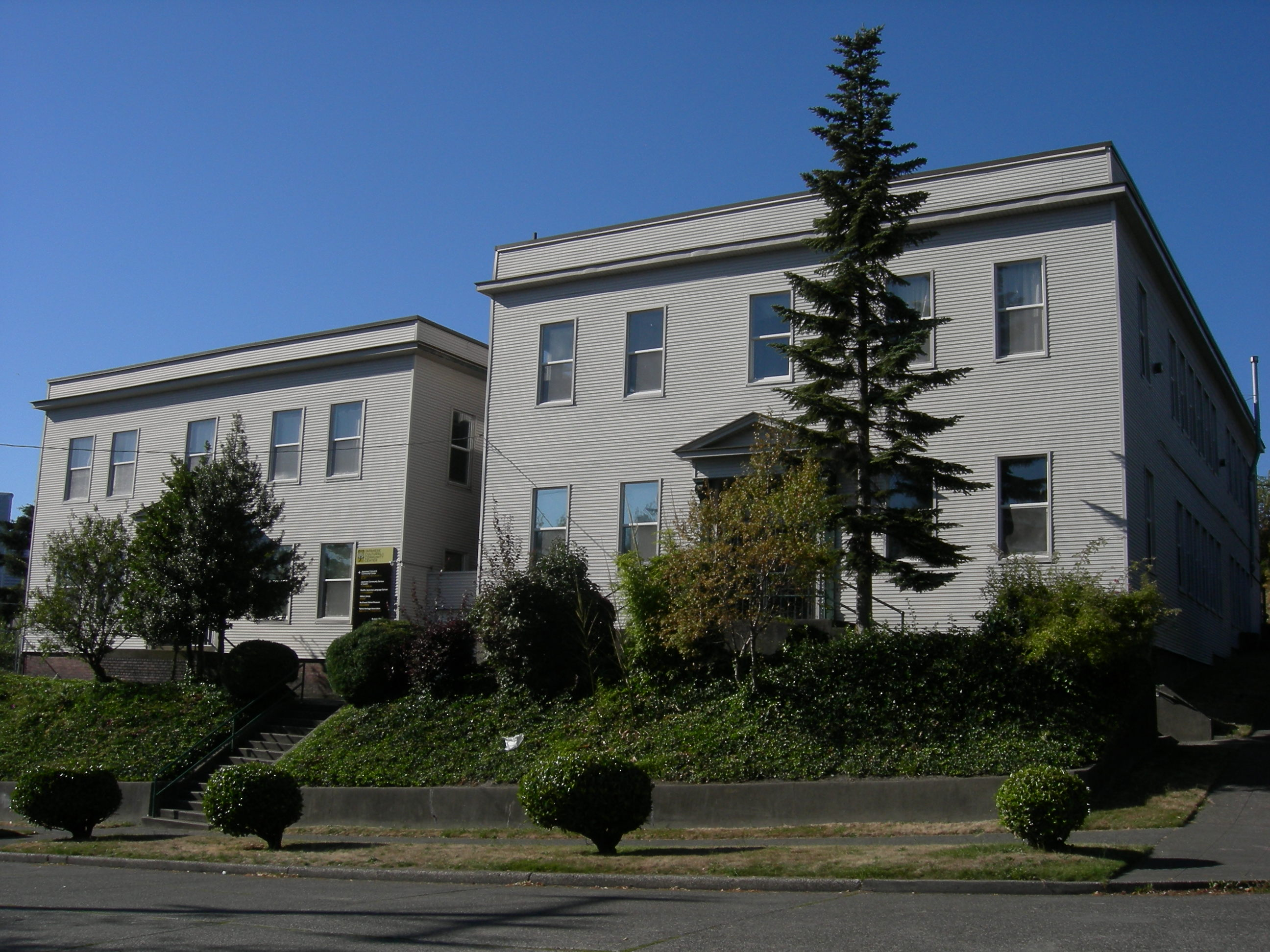
Nihon Go Gakko in Seattle

Established in 1902, Seattle's Nihon Go Gakko (the Seattle Japanese Language School) was the largest Japanese school in the mainland United States prior to World War II with nearly 2,000 students attending the school, spending two hours there a day, five days a week following regular schooling. Nihon Go Gakko is the continental United States's oldest Japanese language school.

The schools' perceived connection to Japan and support for labor movements, including the 1909 and 1920 strikes against the Hawaiian Sugar Planters' Association, exposed fault lines of religion and class within the Japanese American community, and fed growing anti-Japanese sentiment from the larger public. Buddhist organizations were heavily involved in the establishment of schools, and, while many Japanese American Christians founded their own competing schools, others ascribing to a more assimilationist view opposed their existence. Furthermore, non-Japanese also took a dim view of the schools, accusing them of indoctrinating Japanese American children and forming part of a wider strategy of the Japanese government to "colonize" the United States; public school teachers and the Office of Naval Intelligence went so far as to label them "anti-American". Anti-Japanese prejudice had grown with their population, and nativist groups spent much of the late 19th and early 20th centuries lobbying to limit Japanese immigration, create race-based restrictions on citizenship, enact discriminatory property laws, and otherwise combat the "Yellow Peril"; by the 1920s, the focus had shifted to Japanese language schools. A 1920 report by the Federal Commission of Education declared that the 20,000 students of Hawaii's 163 Japanese schools were being "retarded in accepting American customs, manners, ideals, principles, and standards," and recommended the schools be taken over by the public education system. The territorial legislature had already passed a series of laws regulating who could teach and how often students could attend classes, and in April 1923 the Clark Bill imposed a per-student tax, forcing many schools to close when they could not (or would not) pay the tax. In the meantime, California politicians enacted the Parker Bill in August 1921, establishing extensive prerequisites for teacher certification and giving complete control over hiring, operations and curricula in the schools to the Superintendent of Public Education. Late in December 1922, sixteen Hawaiian schools banded together to file a lawsuit challenging the restrictions. The legal case was controversial within the Japanese American community; its more conservative members saw the lawsuit as yet another unnecessary wedge between Japanese Americans and whites, and argued that it would only exacerbate anti-Japanese prejudice. 88 of Hawaii's 146 Japanese schools eventually joined the suit, and Farrington v. Tokushige worked through several appeals before landing in the Supreme Court, where in 1927 the Justices found the regulations unconstitutional.

=== World War II ===
Interest from foreign language learners was limited prior to World War II, and instruction for non-heritage speakers was established more slowly. One 1934 survey found only eight universities in the United States offering Japanese language education, mostly supported by only one instructor per university; it further estimated that only thirteen American professors possessed sufficient fluency in the Japanese language to use it in conducting research. As late as 1940, there were only 65 non-Japanese Americans who were able to read, write and understand the language. Even among nisei graduates of the community Japanese schools, true fluency was rare: a 1941 Military Intelligence Service survey of 3,700 nisei found that 3 percent could potentially become competent after extensive training, 4 percent were "proficient" but still required additional instruction, and just 3 percent were qualified for linguistic work in Japanese. Due to this shortage, the military's need for personnel competent in Japanese even before the US entry into World War II drove the MIS to establish its own specialized school aimed at training specialists to serve as interpreters, interrogators, and translators, the Military Intelligence Service Language School; initially based at the Presidio of San Francisco, it was later moved to Minnesota, first Camp Savage, and then later Fort Snelling. Most of the 6,000 graduates were Japanese American.

At the same time, Japanese language schools on the West Coast aimed at heritage speakers were shut down due to the Japanese American internment. Japanese school instructors and principals were among those detained by the FBI after Pearl Harbor, so many schools had already closed by the time "evacuation" orders were issued in the spring of 1942. Even in Hawaii, which was not affected by Executive Order 9066 but was instead placed under martial law, authorities forced Japanese community schools to dissolve and liquidate their assets; however, after the war, the schools were revived with the support of issei, nisei, and non-Japanese community members. Enrollment in such schools declined compared to the pre-war period; for example, the Moiliili Language School in Honolulu, which with over 1,000 students in 1938 was the largest Japanese-language school in Hawaii, had only 85 students as of 2002.

==== United States Navy Japanese Language School ====
For U.S. and the world to understand Japan and its culture, the United States Navy Japanese Language School, relocated from the University of California, Berkeley, to the University of Colorado in Boulder during the Pacific War, played a major role. Not only did it serve mainly for intelligence activities during the war, but also its graduates, such as Edward Seidensticker, Donald Keene, Otis Cary and others, often called the "Boulder Boys", made important contributions to introducing the Japanese culture in the post-WWII world.

=== Post-World War II ===
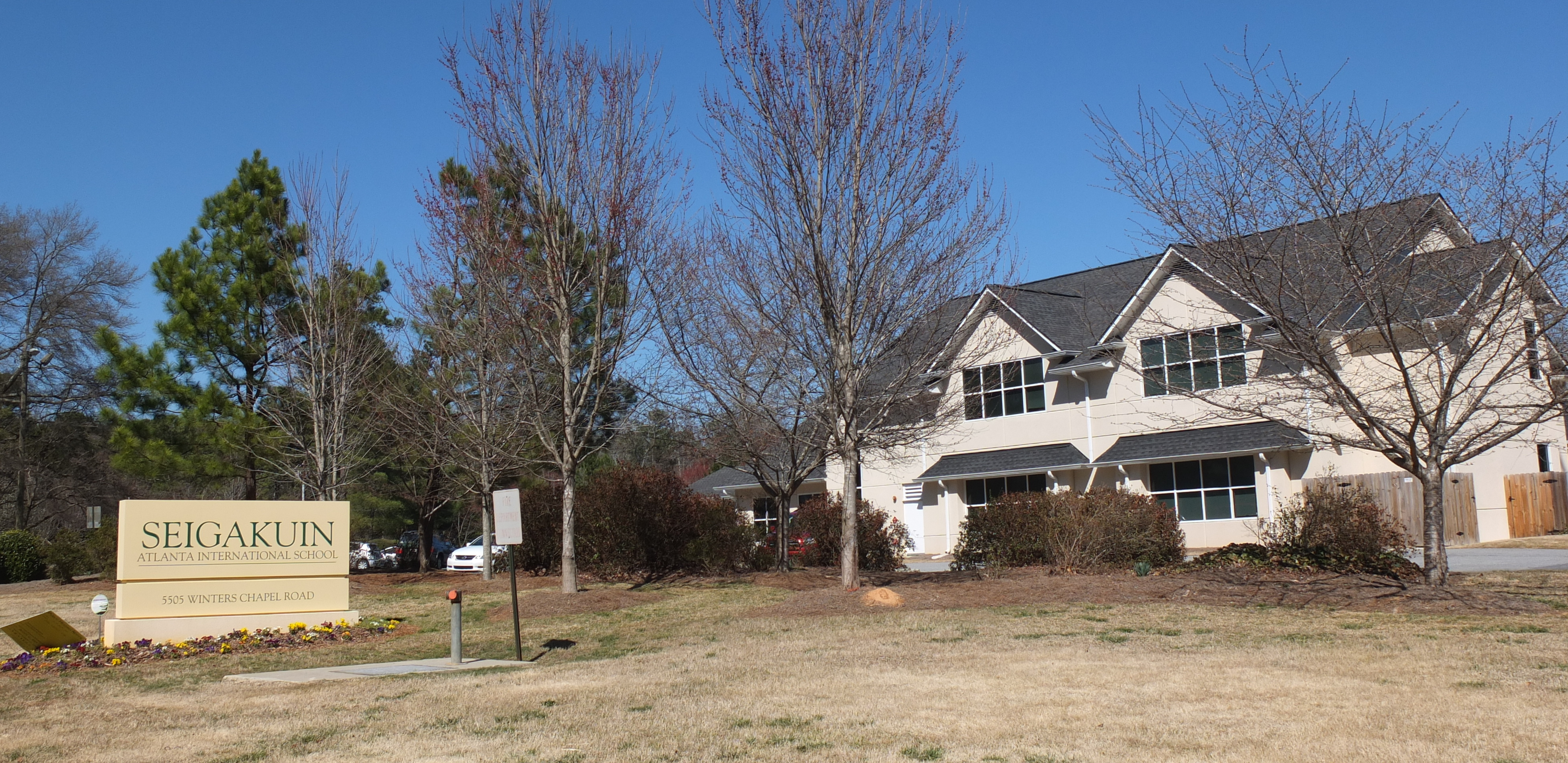
Seigakuin Atlanta International School, a Shiritsu zaigai kyōiku shisetsu Japanese international school in Peachtree Corners, Georgia in Greater Atlanta

The first program aimed at training secondary school Japanese language teachers was established at the University of Hawaii under the provisions of the National Defense Act of 1958; it initially admitted 20 students. Enrollment in Japanese language courses in US high schools had the fastest growth rate out of all languages during the 1980s, the time of the Japanese asset bubble. During the 1990s, The College Board, a United States standardized testing agency, began to offer an SAT Subject Test in Japanese and conducted the first sitting of the Japanese Advanced Placement exam in May 2007; these examinations enable high school students to obtain college credit for their prior study of the Japanese language. However, unlike Chinese, which continued to grow in the early 2000s, the popularity of Japanese declined sharply, with thousands of students dropping the language. According to a survey by the Center for Applied Linguistics, the teaching of Japanese declined at both the primary and secondary levels between 2006 and 2009.

Japanese-language education aimed at native speakers began later, as the rise of the economy of Japan resulted in increasing numbers of companies sending employees and their families to the United States for short-term assignments. As of 2010, the Japanese Ministry of Education, Culture, Sports, Science and Technology officially recognized four Japanese nihonjin gakkō day schools in the United States, in Guam, the Chicago metropolitan area, and the New York City metropolitan area. Several other day/boarding schools are classified as Shiritsu zaigai kyōiku shisetsu (私立在外教育施設) or overseas branches of Japanese private schools; as of 2010 there were three such schools in the U.S. In addition, as of 2010 there were 79 weekend/supplementary schools; in 2006 29 of them were supplied with at least one teacher by the Japanese government.

== Current status ==
Currently, Japanese is not a widely-available college major in the United States, as only 132 U.S. colleges (including in U.S. territories) offer Japanese as an undergraduate major, while this number drops to 123 when excluding 2-year institutions. Mandarin Chinese, another East Asian language, is taught in 129 4-year universities as a major subject. (This increases to 133 when taking 2-year colleges into account.) As for Japanese postgraduate programs, there are 23 in the U.S. (with 44 programs for Chinese, in comparison). This is out of the 4,726 degree-granting institutions in the United States that the National Center for Educational Statistics recorded in 2012-2013. However, according to the Modern Language Association, there has been a 10.3% increase in enrollment in Japanese classes in colleges and universities from 2006 (at 66,605 enrolled) to 2009 (at 73,434 enrolled). According to the Japan Foundation, the increase was 19.7% in the same period.

Japanese in pre-collegiate education has not seen the same growth rates. In 2011-2012, there were 129,189 public and private primary and secondary schools in the US. Of this number, 30,861 were private and 98,328 were public (including charter schools). In 2007-2008, these numbers were 132,446, 33,740, and 98,916, respectively. In 2008, the Center for Applied Linguistics found that the number of Japanese classes taught in primary and secondary schools dropped from their numbers in 1987. The organization did not specify the exact numbers of any year in their executive summary of their national survey of foreign language teaching in U.S. schools, however. The number of foreign language classes in total dropped in this time period. Pre-collegiate institutions are increasing optional Japanese testing. The Japanese Language and Culture AP test was offered at 666 secondary schools and 329 participating colleges in 2016; 2,481 students, from earlier than the 9th grade to the 12th graders, took the test in total, which was a 2% increase from 2015’s total of 2,431 students.

== Evolution of textbook pedagogy ==
Dr. Eleanor Harz Jorden, the author of Beginning Japanese, Parts 1 and 2, wrote the first pedagogical grammar of Japanese written by a linguist. She also coauthored the widely used Mastering Japanese textbook, along with the Foreign Service Language Institute and Hamako Ito Chaplin. Colleagues in the field of Japanese pedagogy, such as Professor Mari Noda, say that Dr. Jorden was unusual in her time in that she insisted on the use of audio recordings to supplement the text-based grammar and vocabulary in her work. She considered social interaction and vocal language the focus of her research. Noda remade Mastering Japanese into Japanese: The Spoken Language, which is part of a larger series on Japanese that also focuses on other aspects such as the written language. Japanese textbook dialogues have changed since the 1970s. Dialogues from the 1970s were thought to be less natural and practical than they should be by educators like Jorden.

After Dr. Jorden’s time, the trend of Japanese as a Foreign Language (JFL) has been to focus on reading, writing, and grammar chapters arranged by themes based on pragmatic, real-life situations. Some emphasis is also placed on communicative, “real” language. For instance, in each of the two Genki textbooks, published by the Japan Times, the content is split between a Dialogue and Grammar section and a Reading and Writing section. In the Dialogue and Grammar section, the chapters have themes such as “Asking for Directions” or “Finding a Part-Time Job”. The chapter has a long conversation, or two shorter ones, recorded on the accompanying CD-ROM, and a transcript and English translations of the conversation. Then, there is a vocabulary list with relevant definitions, grammatical lessons, and several problems (which may or may not have vocal narration in the CD). The Reading and Writing section has simple stories written in Japanese, comprehension questions about the stories, kanji with space provided for writing them, and some short cultural explanations.

Junko Mori, Kimberly Jones, and Tsuyoshi Ono believe that use of cultural and discourse knowledge may be lacking in classrooms, making it so that students aren’t totally prepared for real-life interactions with native Japanese speakers. Mori used the example of doushite, a Japanese word for “why” that is frequently used in Japanese textbooks and exercises. It is a convenient counterpart for the English “why,” but has more forceful, negative connotations for Japanese speakers than “why” does for English speakers. The required sentence structure for answers to “why”-questions is more complicated, and requires that a creative explanation be formulated. Thus, according to her, doushite needs to be placed in social context more so than other grammatical terms, but often isn’t—the exchanges are used primarily as exchanges of information rather than social tools. In conversations between Japanese speakers that Mori compiled, doushite was rarely used at all to elicit information. A survey of dialogues in modern textbooks found that they are, on average, short and decontextualized, involve only two speakers, are contextless, arranged in neat question-answer pairs that are complete sentences, and are without many conversational linguistic devices.

== See also ==
- Hoshū jugyō kō
  - List of hoshū jugyō kō
- Kinmon Gakuen
- Nihon Go Gakko (Tacoma)
- Language teaching
- Farrington v. Tokushige
