= Kobe Terrace (Seattle) =

Park in Seattle, Washington, U.S.

Coordinates: 47°36′0″N 122°19′30.2″W

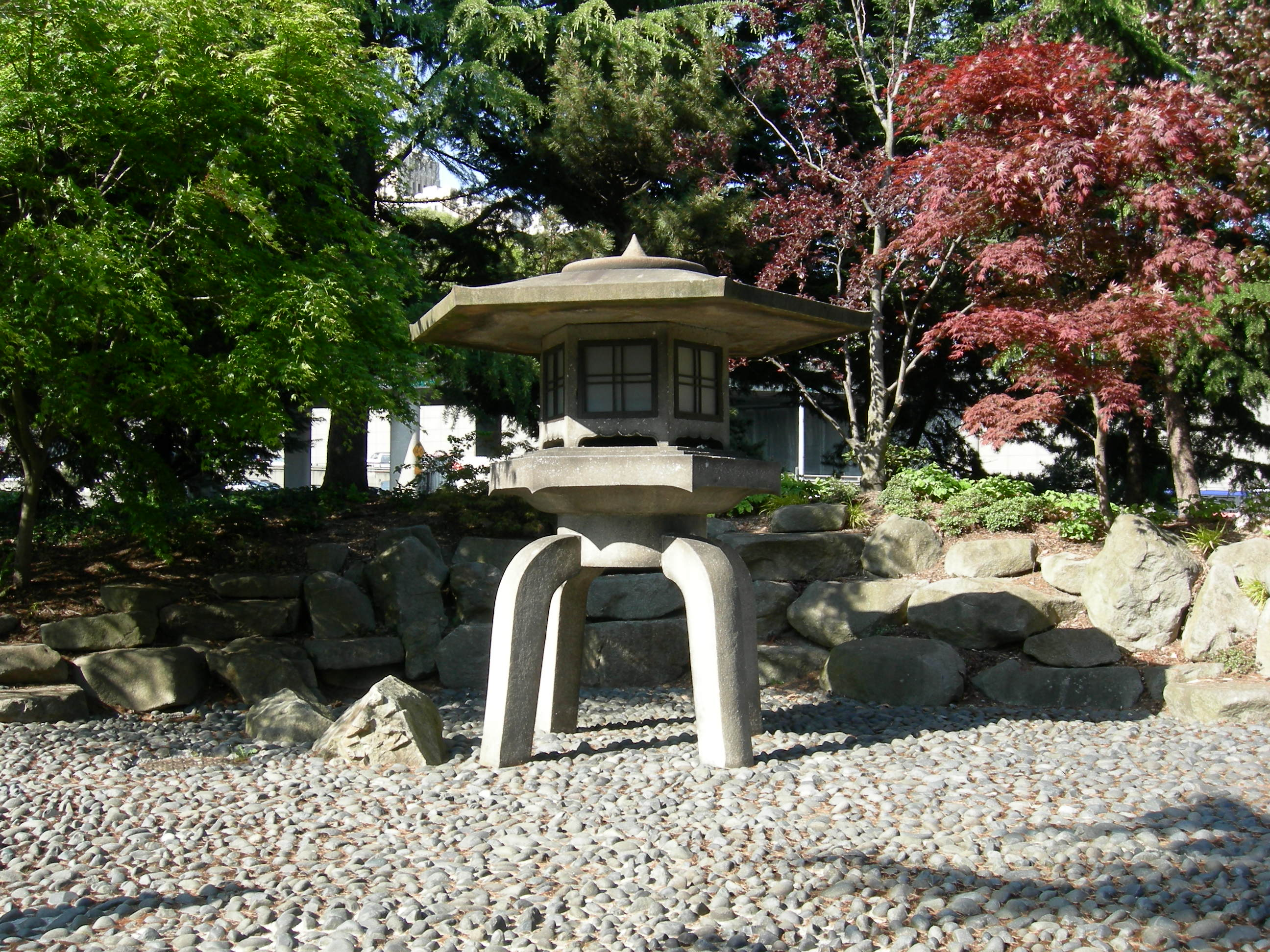
- Lantern
- Interactive map of Kobe Terrace
- Location: Seattle, Washington, U.S.

Kobe Terrace is a 1-acre (4,000 m^{2}) public park in the International District neighborhood of Seattle, Washington. It incorporates the Danny Woo International District Community Garden. Named after Kobe, Seattle's sister city in Japan, it occupies most of the land bounded on the west by 6th Avenue S., on the north by S. Washington Street, on the east by Interstate 5, and on the south by S. Main Street.

Some of the wood structures in the Danny Woo Garden were constructed by the Neighborhood Design/Build Studio of the University of Washington College of Architecture and Urban Planning under the direction of Steve Badanes.

The former Nippon Kan Theatre is adjacent to the park.

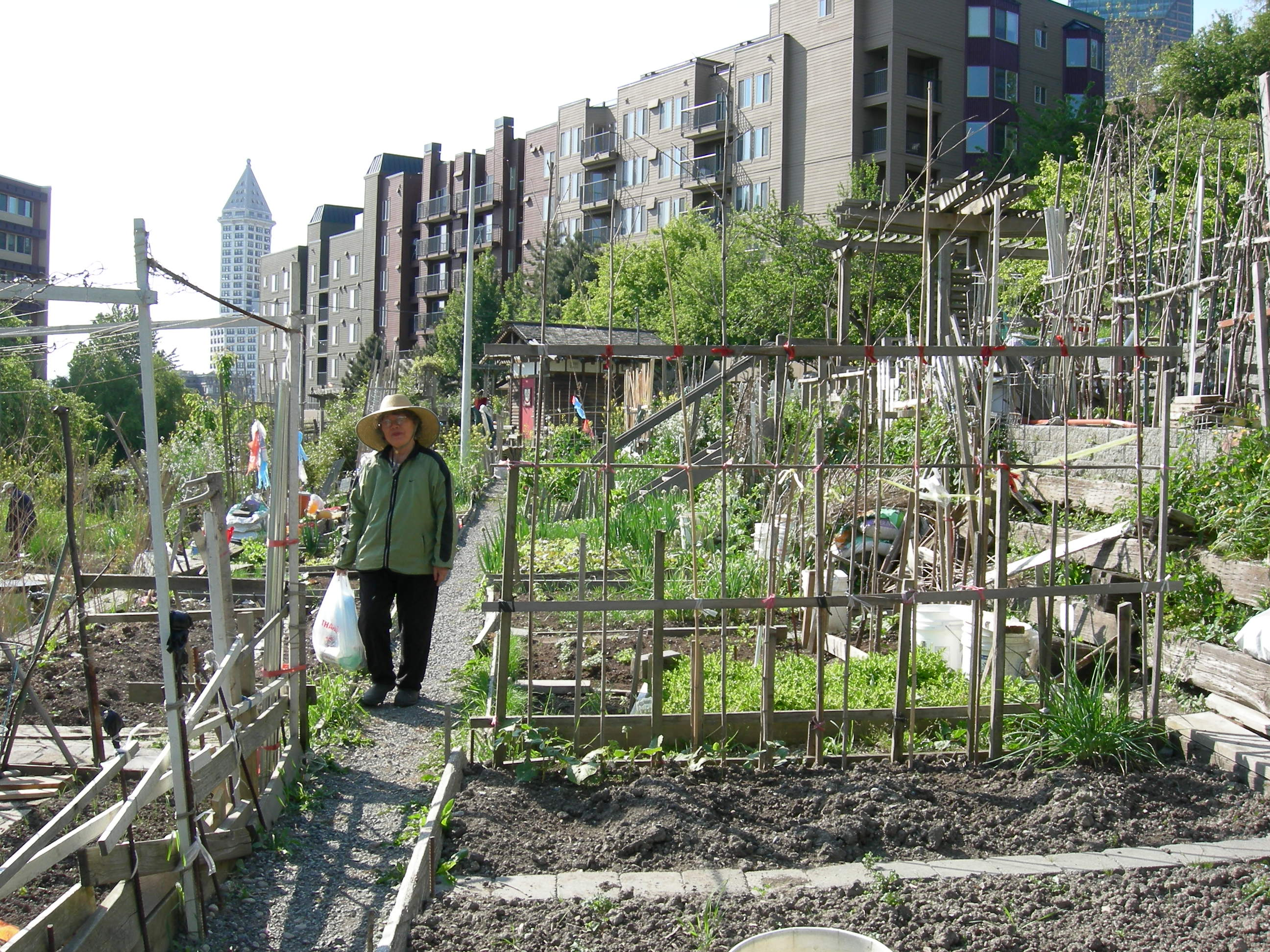

== See also ==
- History of the Japanese in Seattle
