= Panama Hotel =

Panama Hotel may refer to:

- Panama Hotel (Panama), designed by Edward Durell Stone
- Panama Hotel (San Diego), California, U.S., listed on National Register of Historic Places in San Diego County, California
- Panama Hotel (Seattle), Washington, U.S.
- Panama Hotel, fictional place in Hotel on the Corner of Bitter and Sweet
