= Wilderness Inner-City Leadership Development =

Wilderness Inner-City Leadership Development (WILD) is located in the center of Seattle Chinatown/International District (CID). This non-profit youth program was found in 1997 by Stella Chao, who was a former executive director for International District Housing Alliance (IDHA). Stella Chao is currently the Director for Department of Neighborhoods in the city of Seattle. WILD is a youth program that's open to immigrants who are in high school to develop their leadership skills. Every fall, they have a fall program open to students in Seattle Public Schools from age 13–19 to work on projects to make CID a better community. Some youths participate in the Intergenerational Program where they can develop communication skills cross generations in the Asian Pacific Islander community.

WILD celebrating its 10th anniversary with elders at Alki Beach, Seattle in 2007

== History ==
International District Housing Alliance (IDHA) is a non-profit organization which has been working for the past 30 years in Seattle's Chinatown/International District to improve life quality for the CID residents. Its initial mission was to provide affordable housing to the low-income community in Chinatown/International District. Throughout the years, IDHA has evolved to meet community needs, from providing affordable housings to leadership development, environmental justice, community building and more. In 1997, the executive director of IDHA found WILD so youths in the community can learn about the environment earlier.

== Background ==
WILD is a community formed using bottom-up strategies where all members take part in making decisions also get to decide on a specific project they want to work on. Other than big projects (that are partnered with other organizations), WILD members are always encouraged to get involved in community events and activities related to the environment year round. They are actively involved in the spring and fall Chinatown/International District clean-up. While removing graffiti and picking up trash, they also planted plants in CID. During winter of every year, all the youth help with the Holiday Dinner and Gift Drive host by IDHA. For the gift drive, they go from setting up booths to wrapping and distributing gifts to the low-income family. In addition to all these activities, youth also get access for homework help and help with college applications. WILD has been evaluated by Seattle Partners of Health Communities showing that this program does promotes community-accountability and it incorporated community-defined measures of successes.

== Grants ==
WILD (under IDHA) has received multiple grants from different funders. Particularly significant was CARE (Community Action for a Renewed Environment), a grant from the U.S. Environmental Protection Agency to IDHA. CARE is a competitive program for community organizations involved in addressing risks of toxic pollution from different sources to the environment. The CARE program financially supports communities with pollution problems to help them reduce the exposure to the pollutants. CARE offers two tiers of Cooperative Agreements, Level 1 and Level 2, which grant different amounts of funding.

In 2005, IDHA received a Level 1 CARE Cooperative Agreement to address environmental issues in the Chinatown/International District due to economic disadvantages. This grant covered concerns like lead paint in old buildings, air pollution, uneven pavement, etc. in the CID community. WILD youth helped with translation and education in the community to make residents aware of the issues. IDHA received a Level 2 CARE Cooperative Agreement in 2007. This allowed WILD to partner with other organizations to further reduce pollution in the CID. The program further expanded education awareness of the pollution issues in the community. They also use this fund on the "Green Street" campaign to make CID a dumpster-free community. WILD youth used these funds for most of their work on environmental justice from 2005 to 2007.

== Projects ==
WILD runs at least one big project a year, mostly focused on environmental justice, dedicated to making Chinatown/International District a better place for people to live.

=== Community Perspective Project ===
This is one of the major projects done by WILD youth in the year of 2004. This project used three different ways to gain information about the Chinatown/International District community. ComNET^{sm} (Computerized neighborhood environmental tracking) was used. ComNET^{sm} is hand-held computer allowing the youth to track street and sidewalk conditions by taking pictures matching with the problems (i.e. graffiti, trip hazards and feces). According to Joyce Pisnanont, Youth Program Coordinator for WILD from 2003 to 2007, the program found that ComNET^{sm} only tracks the deficits of the neighborhood so the program decided to supplement the project with Photovoice and multilingual interviews. Through Photovoice, the youth and elders of the CID community are able to express their perspective on what they like or dislike about the community. This project was presented to Seattle City Council, Jim Compton by the youths in early 2005 regarding the safety concerns in Seattle CID. In May 2005, WILD youth brought this project to the Community-Based Solutions for Environmental & Economic Justice 4th Annual Conference at the University of Washington. The main focus of this project is to help the limited-English speaking residents to speak up about health and safety related issues in their community.

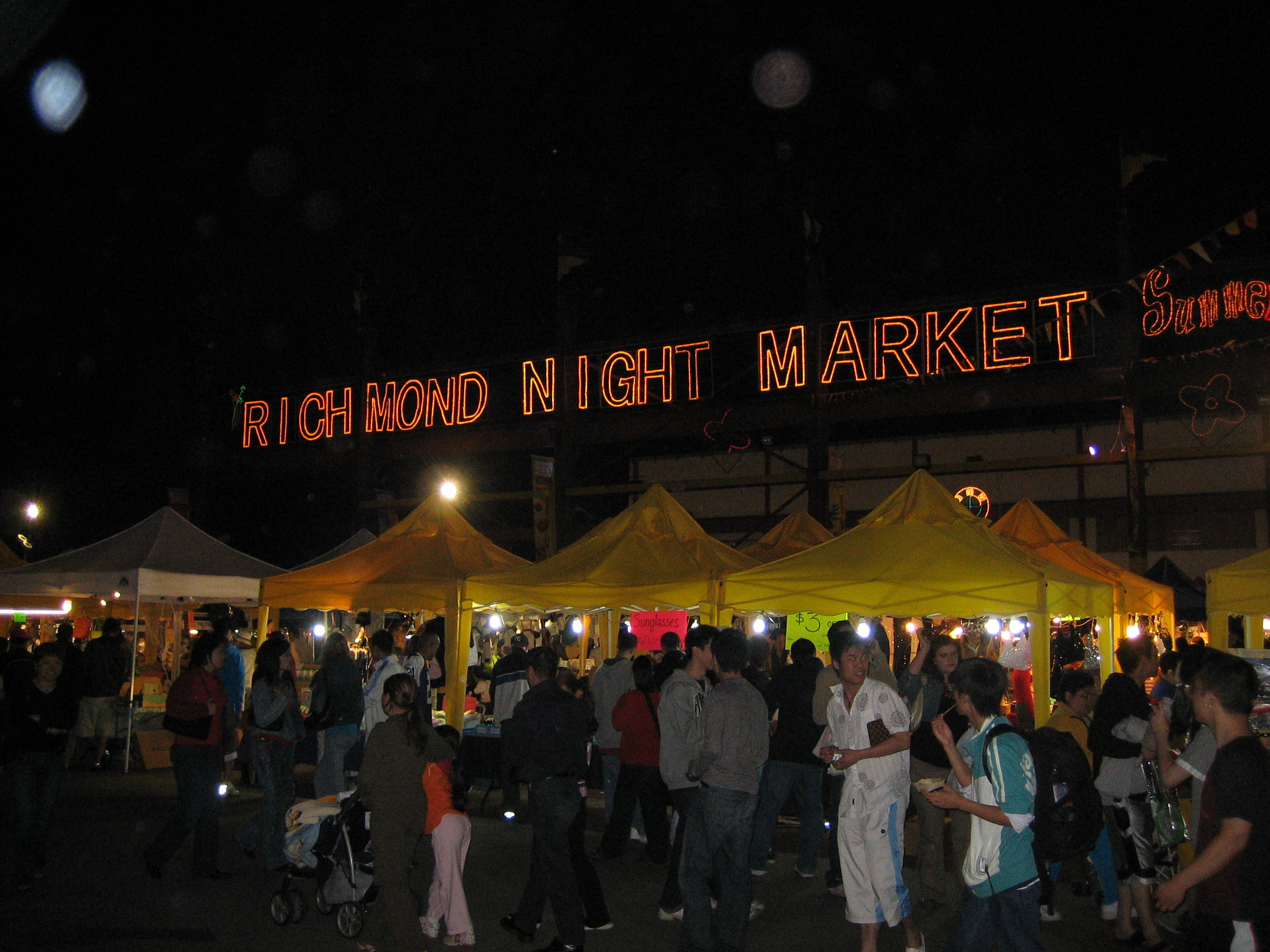
Richmond Night Market field trip 2006-5-19

=== Night Market ===
After the Community Perspective Project, WILD devoted most of its time to researching and developing a night market to encourage people in the community to go to public parks after dark. It is believed that the night market has helped the public safety issues in the Chinatown/International District. WILD youth took a trip to Richmond Night Market at Canada to observe the night market in action to create a successful event. In August 2006, the first Night Market was held in Hing Hay Park in CID. There were multiple organizations that helped with creating the pilot night market, including The Chinese Chamber of Commerce, The Community Action Program and The Chinatown/International District Business Improvement Area (CIDBIA). In 2008, the CID Night Market is hosted by CIDBIA and some WILD youths continue to volunteer helping out with the event.

=== Spill Kits ===
Youths are responsible for translating information on recycling and composting. Every summer, during the Summer Festivals in Chinatown, the youth educate the general public about what they can recycle. In 2006, WILD youth distributed Spill Kits to the small businesses in Chinatown and taught them how to use the kits. Spill Kits are used to keep hazardous chemicals out of local water systems, preventing water pollution.

=== Public Safety Outreach ===
Danny Woo International District Community Garden is the largest green space in the CID, established in 1975. This community garden allows the CID's elders to grow their native vegetables. In spring 2010, WILD youth helped Danny Woo Garden succeed by hosting Earth Day in the garden. This introduced more people to the garden, raising community awareness, and promoted the garden as a safe place to spend time in, walking or having a picnic.

=== Environmental Outreach ===
The EPA listed the Duwamish River as a federal superfund site in 2001. In 2006, WILD youth took a sailing trip to the river to learn about contamination zones there, along with the Salish Sea. As of Fall 2010, WILD youth intended to start another project related to the Duwamish River.
