= Chinatown–International District Night Market =

Annual event in Seattle, Washington, U.S.

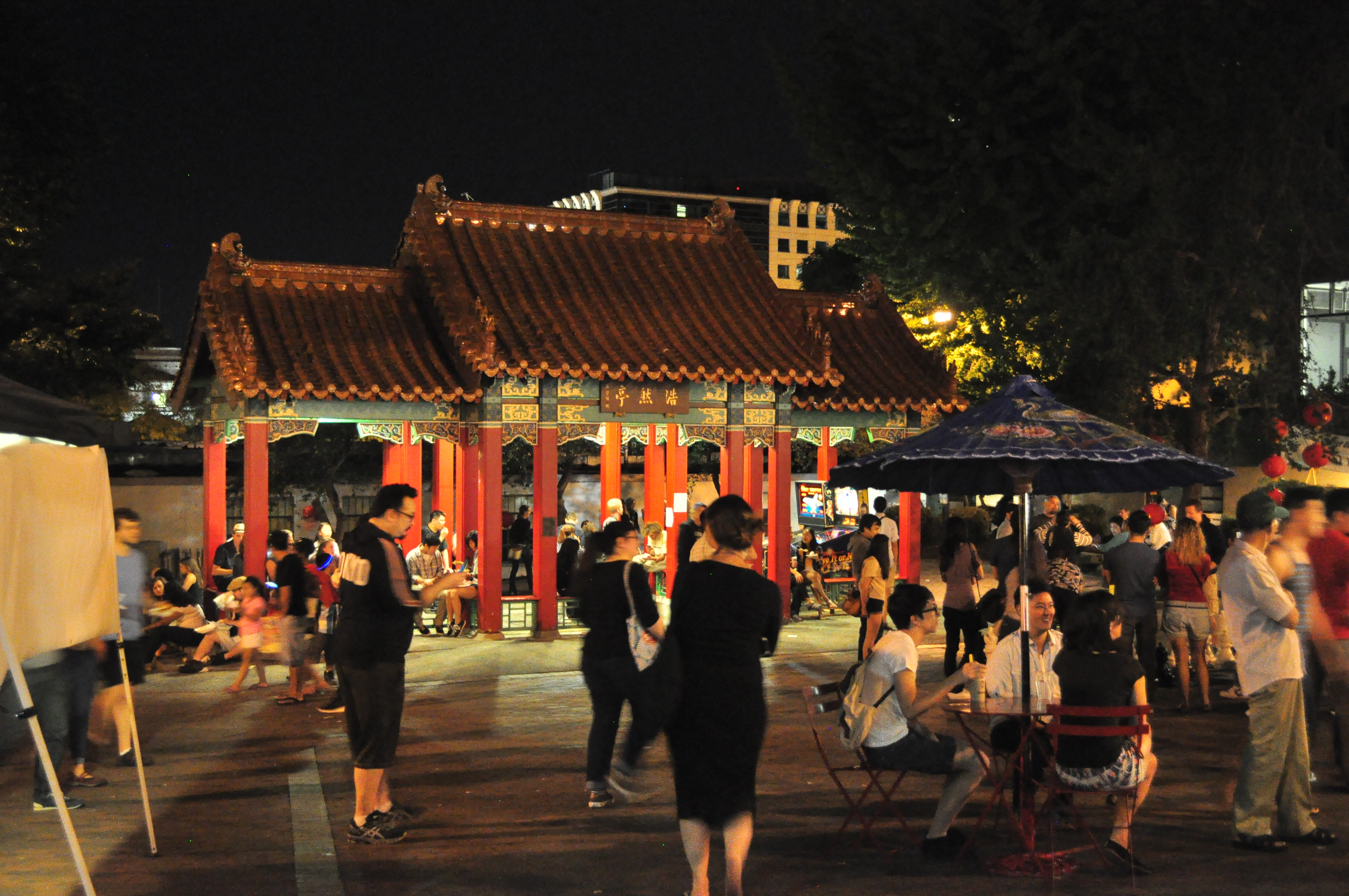
- Event participants at Hing Hay Park during the night market, 2015
- Status: Active
- Genre: Night market
- Frequency: Annually
- Locations: Chinatown–International District, Seattle, Washington
- Country: United States
- Inaugurated: 2006
- Organiser: Chinatown-International District Business Improvement Area
- Website: seattlechinatownid.com/experiences/c-id-night-market

The Chinatown–International District Night Market (or simply CID Night Market) is an annual night market in Seattle's Chinatown–International District (CID), in the U.S. state of Washington. Established in 2006, the event is organized by the non-profit group Chinatown-International District Business Improvement Area (CIDBIA). It has featured food, film screenings, and entertainment.

== History ==
The night market was established in 2006. The 2020 event was cancelled because of the COVID-19 pandemic. It went on a hiatus in 2023. In 2024, Amazon donated $250,000 to fund the night market through 2026.
