= Panama Hotel (Seattle) =

Historic hotel in Washington, United States

Coordinates: 47.5999°N 122.3259°W

- U.S. National Register of Historic Places
- U.S. National Historic Landmark
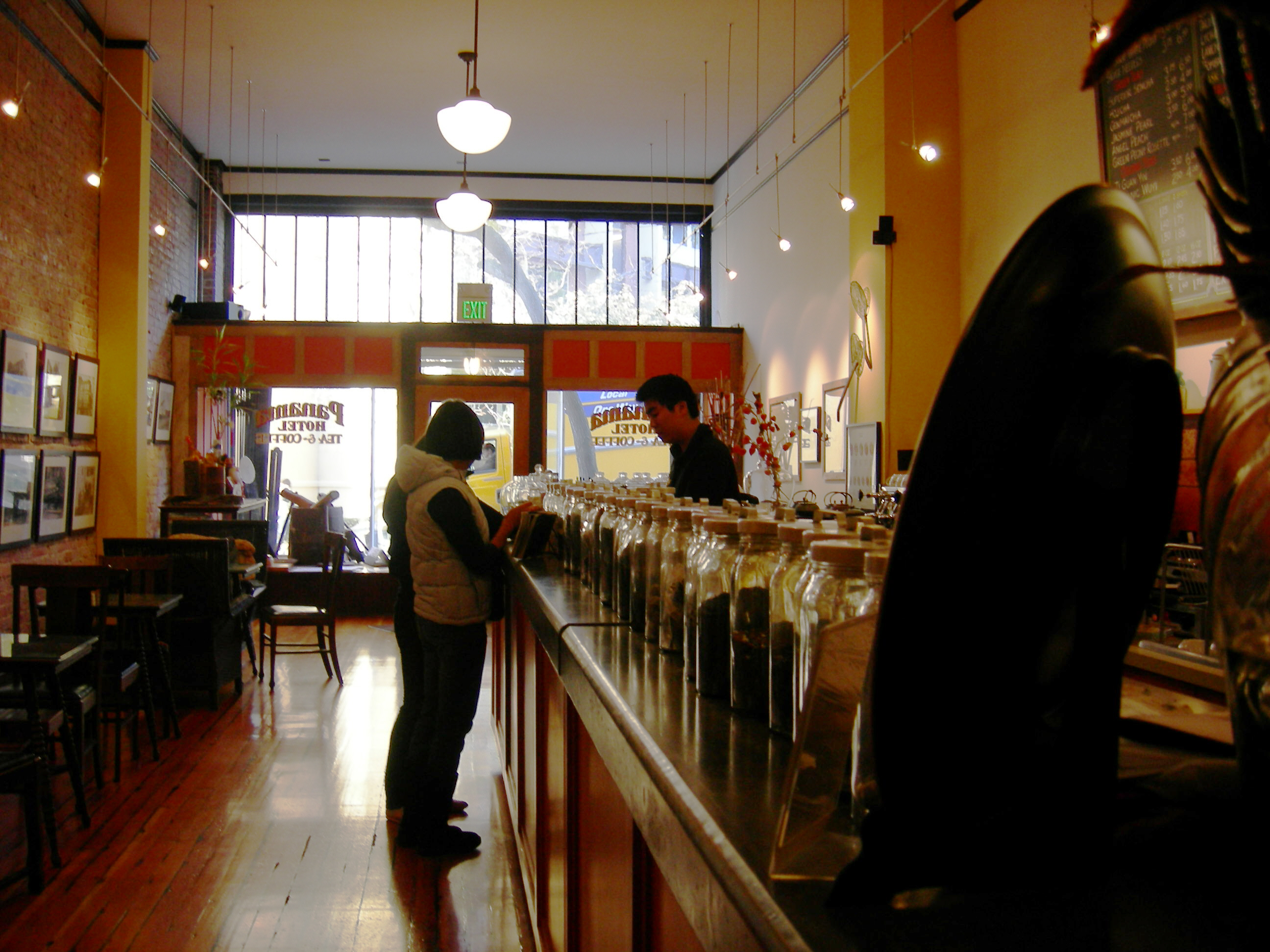
- Coffeehouse in the old lobby of the Panama Hotel
- Interactive map of Panama Hotel
- Location: 605 S. Main St; Seattle, Washington
- Built: 1910
- Architect: Sabro Ozasa
- Website: panamahotelseattle.net
- NRHP reference No.: 06000462

Significant dates
- Added to NRHP: March 20, 2006
- Designated NHL: March 20, 2006

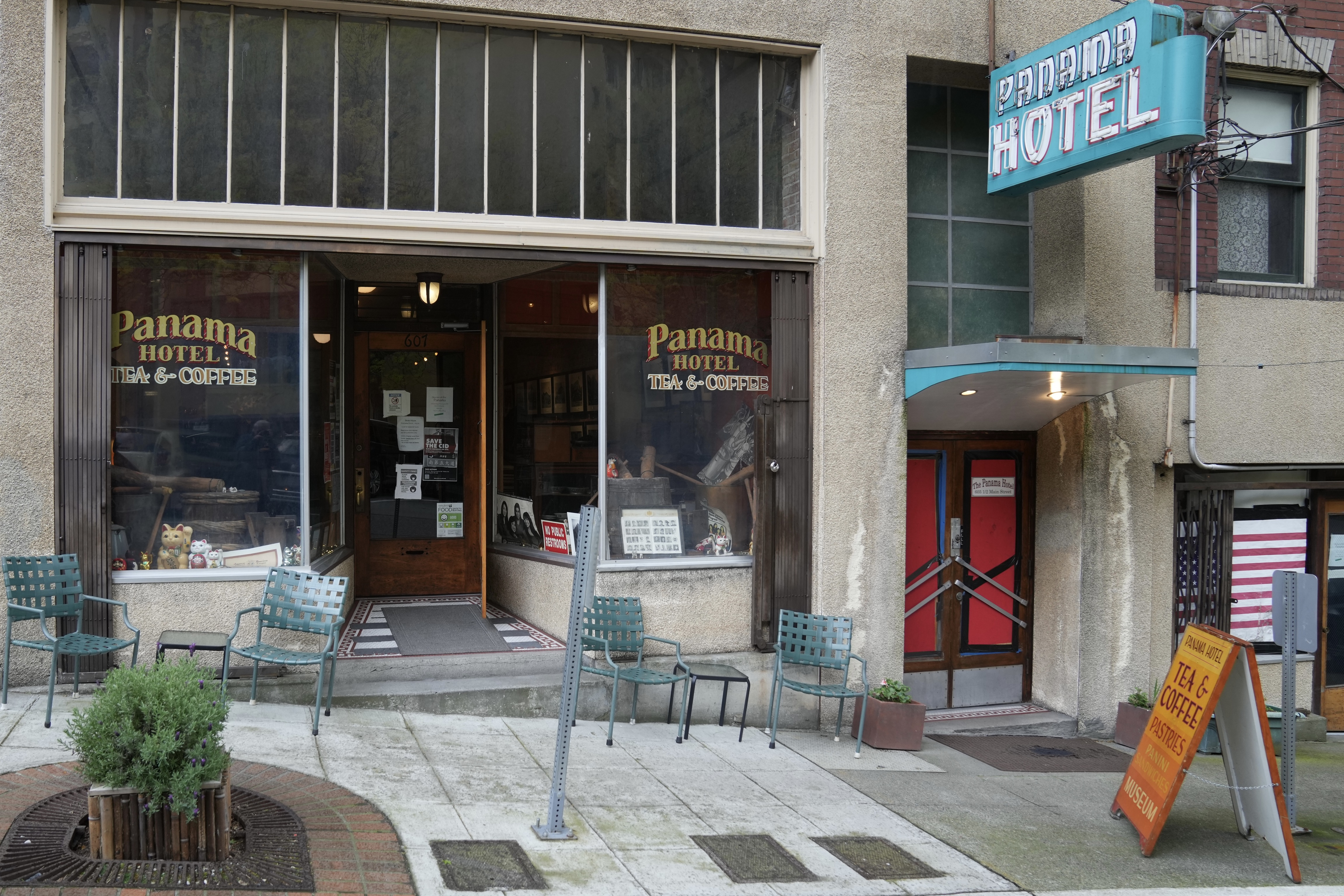
The Panama Hotel, Tea & Coffee, and Museum, May 2022

The Panama Hotel is a hotel located in the International District in Seattle, Washington. Completed in 1910, the hotel was designed by the first Japanese-American architect to practice in Seattle, Sabro Ozasa. Ozasa designed the hotel to resemble a Buddhist monastery. The Panama contains the last remaining Japanese bathhouse (sento) in the United States.

The Panama Hotel was essential to the Japanese community, the building housed businesses, a bathhouse, sleeping quarters for residents and visitors, and restaurants. Since 1985 the Panama Hotel has been owned by Jan Johnson. Johnson, the third owner of the Panama Hotel has restored the building to emulate its previous condition before the internment of Japanese Americans from Seattle.

Johnson has closed off the basement that holds the belongings of the Japanese families to the public, and has installed a glass panel in the floorboards for visitors to view the artifacts from above.

The Panama Hotel is known for the rich Japanese American history before and during World War II. The hotel is known for housing the belongings of the Japanese families in Seattle once Executive Order 9066 was enacted and the detention of Japanese in internment camps. After the Japanese American internment, most of the Seattle-based families were not able to return due to death, financial constraints, and relocation; their belongings still reside in the basement of the hotel.

It is also known as being the namesake of the novel Hotel on the Corner of Bitter and Sweet by Jamie Ford.

The Panama Hotel was awarded the Japanese Foreign Minister’s Commendation for their contributions to promotion of mutual understanding between Japan and the United States on December 1, 2020.

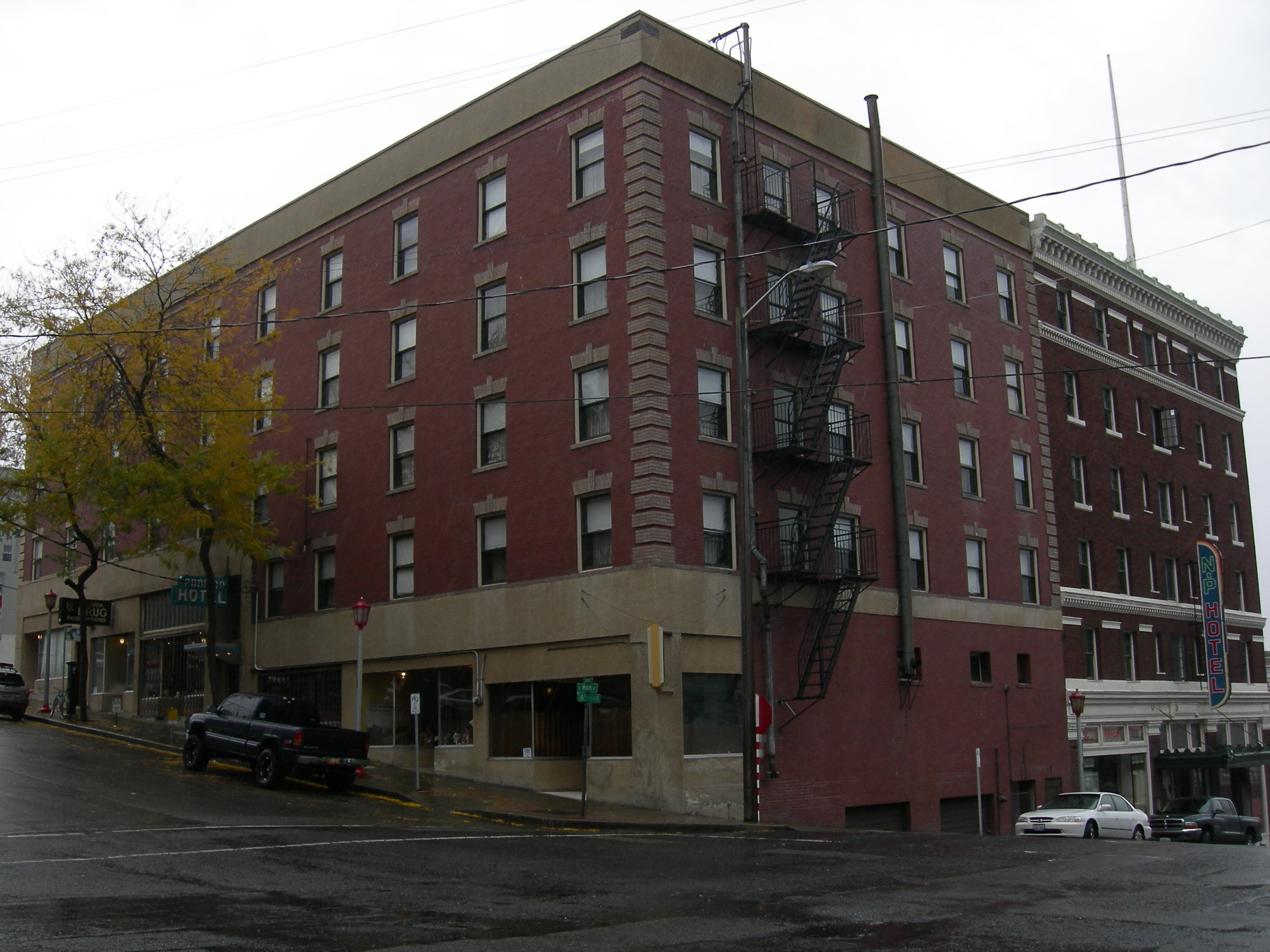
Panama and NP Hotels, side-by-side. Panama Hotel is at left.

== Seattle's "Japantown" (Nihonmachi) ==
Located in the International District of Seattle, multiple districts were formed during the early 1900s based on race and ethnicity. Seattle's "Japantown" (Nihonmachi) community was established to keep races segregated, but it allowed cultural bonds to be formed.

Japanese immigrants from all the regions of Japan came to Seattle and became interconnected because of the Nihonmachi. Even though the Japanese people of Japantown faced poverty due to economic hardships, skilled workers in all different industries came together because of the immigration from different prefectures in Japan.

== Japanese bathhouses (Sento) ==
The Panama Hotel was one of the focal points in Japantown before World War II. The hotel was known for the Hashidate-Yu, one of the four bathhouses (Sento) in Seattle during the early twentieth century. Separated into two areas, one for men and the other for women and children, these bathhouses were essential in the Japantown because most of the residents did not have access to facilities in their residences. The bathhouses allowed people to interact with one another and spread their culture with the locals or visitors from other countries.

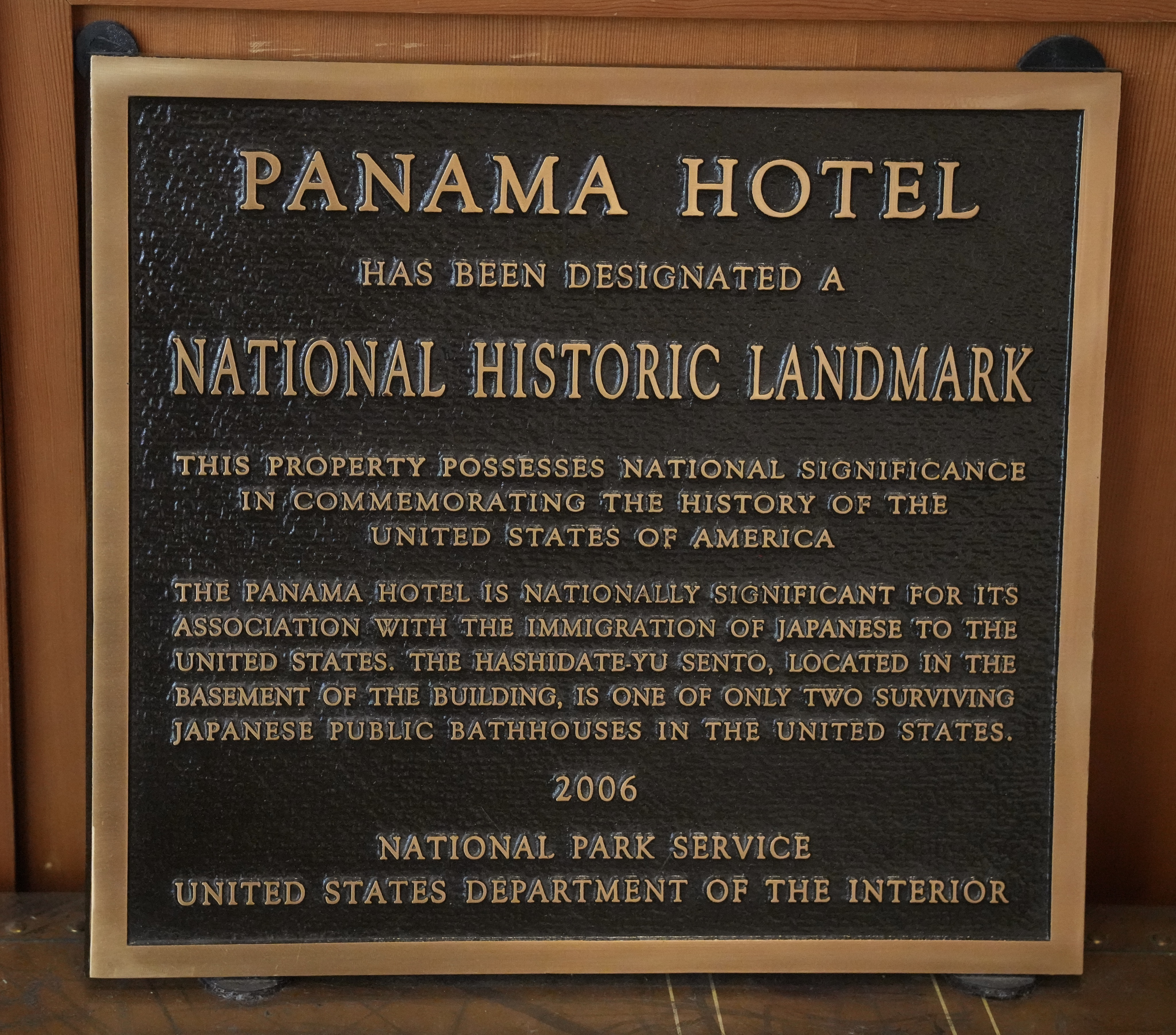
The Panama Hotel has been designated a “National Historic Landmark”.

== Historical Designation ==
The Panama hotel is protected at both a local and national level. It was declared a National Historic Landmark building in 2006, and on April 9, 2015, the Panama Hotel was designated a National Treasure by the National Trust for Historic Preservation - one of only 60 in the United States. In January of 2022 the Seattle Landmarks Preservation Board designated it a city landmark.

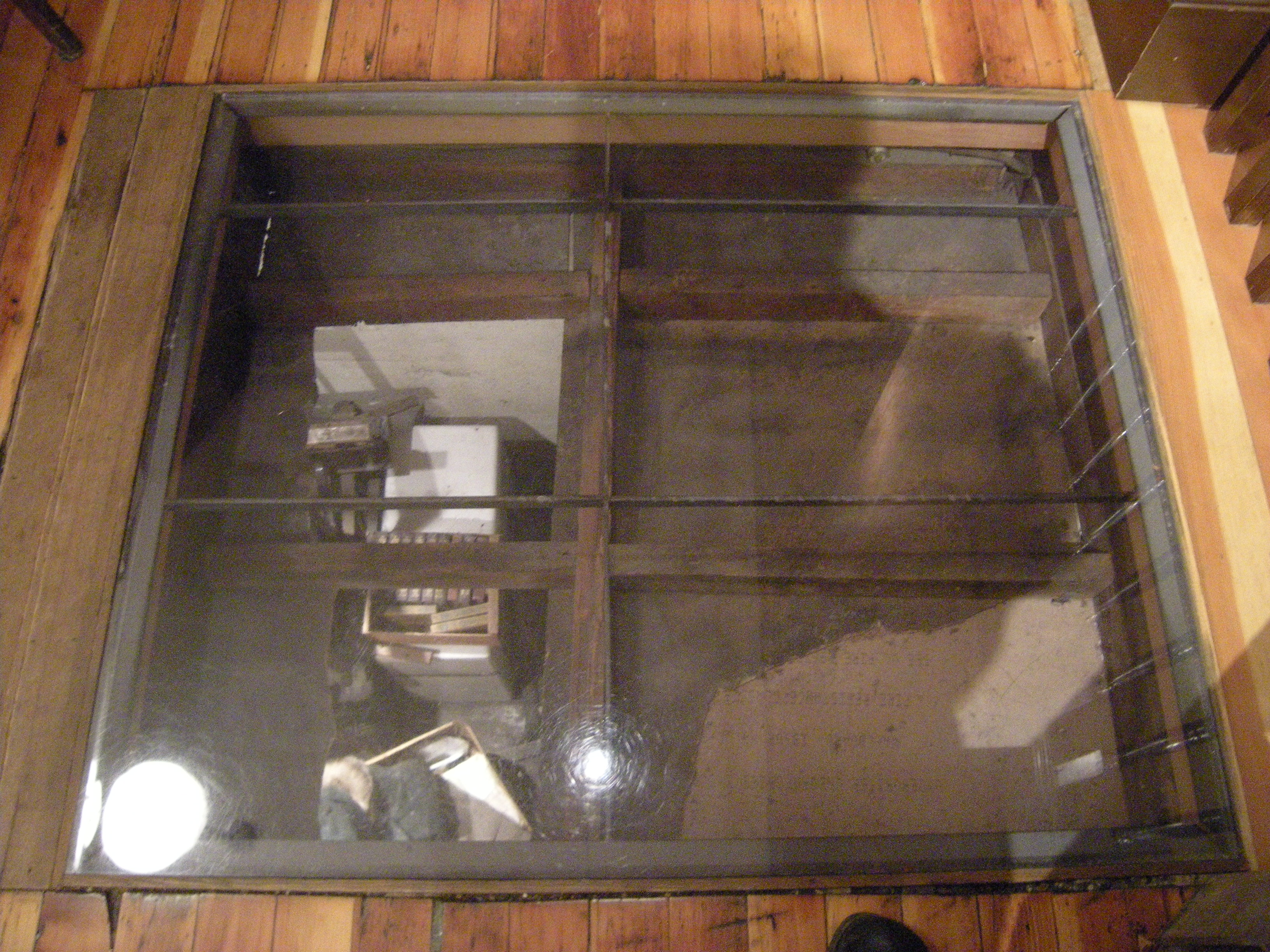
A view into the basement of the Panama Hotel through a glass panel installed in the floorboards. The basement houses the belongings of the Japanese American families who were forced to leave their homes and belongings because of the Japanese internment.

== Film ==
The Panama Hotel Legacy is a film currently in production that will explore the unique history of the 105 year-old property and the continuous stewardship to preserve its history and educate current and future generations.

The film will detail the building's influence in place, culture and community, the ongoing preservation efforts for the Panama Hotel including the Hashidate Yu Sento, one of the most well-preserved bathhouses in the U.S. and the archiving of Japanese Americans' belongings stored in the hotel as a result of Executive Order 9066 issued by President Roosevelt in 1942.

== See also ==
- History of the Japanese in Seattle

== Sources ==
- Alanen, Arnold Robert; Melnick, Robert (2000). Preserving Cultural Landscapes in America, JHU Press, ISBN 0-8018-6264-7.
