= Historic Chinatown Gate (Seattle) =

Paifang archway in Seattle, Washington, U.S.

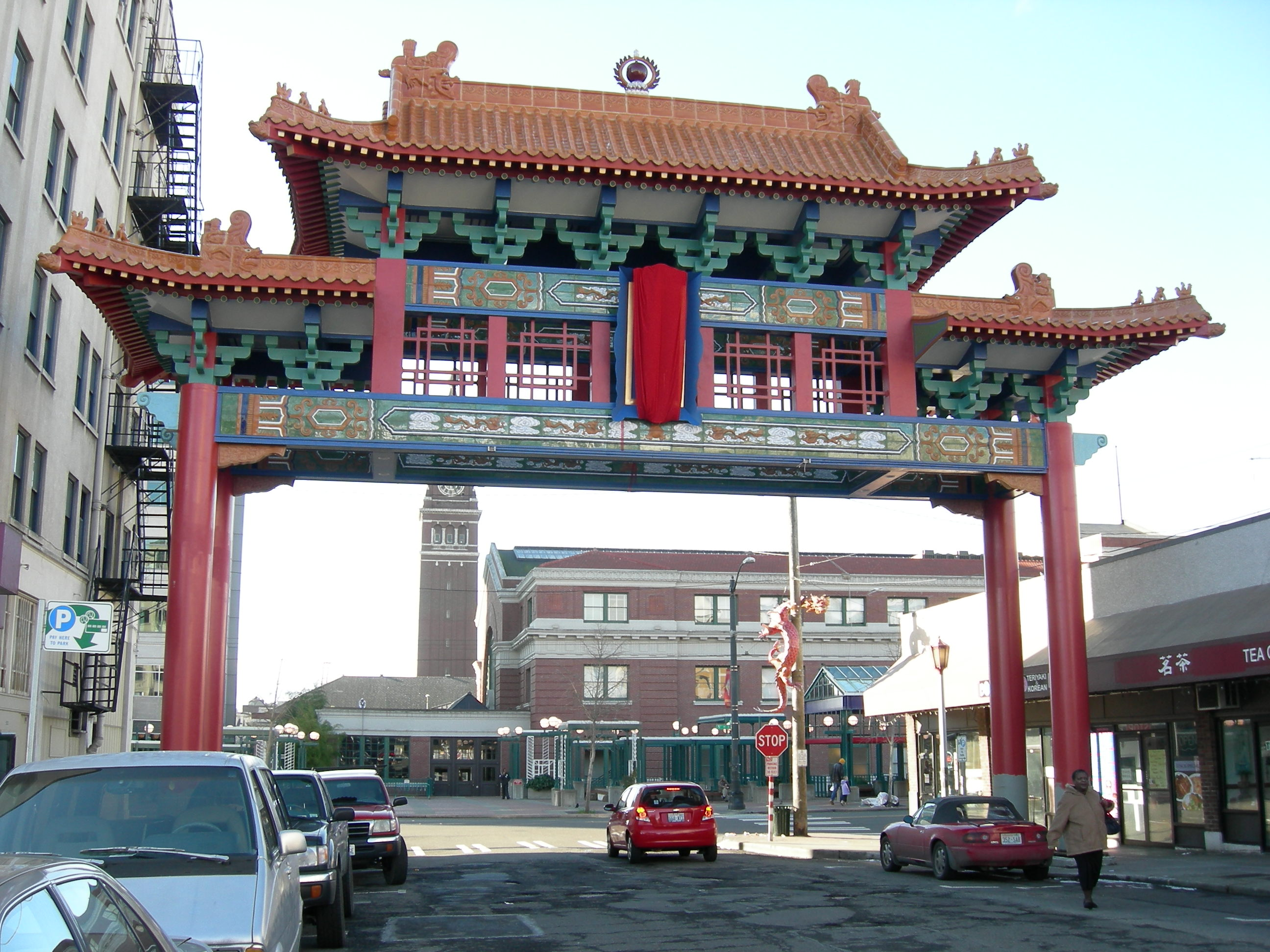
- Looking west towards Union Station and King Street Station

- Location within Downtown Seattle

General information
- Status: Completed
- Type: Archway
- Architectural style: Paifang
- Location: S King Street & 5th Avenue S Seattle, Washington
- Coordinates: 47.59836°N 122.32735°W
- Groundbreaking: April 23, 2006
- Inaugurated: February 9, 2008
- Cost: $500,000
- Owner: Historic Chinatown Gate Foundation

Height
- Height: 45 feet (14 m)

Technical details
- Structural system: Steel
- Material: Ceramic tiles

Design and construction
- Architects: Ming Zhang and Paul Wu
- Architecture firm: MulvannyG2 Architecture

The Historic Chinatown Gate (traditional Chinese: 中華門; simplified Chinese: 中华门) is a modern Paifang archway in the Chinatown-International District neighborhood of Seattle, Washington.

== Description and history ==
The 45-foot-tall (14 m) archway is located over South King Street east of 5th Avenue South and the International District/Chinatown light rail station, marking the west end of the Chinatown neighborhood. The gate, designed by Paul Wu and Ming Zhang of MulvannyG2 Architecture of Bellevue, Washington, was built over a period of several months in late 2007 and is composed of a steel structure and ceramic ornaments, including 8,000 ceramic tiles made in southern China. The $500,000 construction cost was paid for by the Historic Chinatown Gate Foundation, a non-profit organization established in 1999 to build the archway. The Historic Chinatown Gate was dedicated on February 9, 2008, during a ceremony attended by local officials, including Seattle mayor Greg Nickels and Governor Christine Gregoire.

Plans for a second gate at the eastern end of the district, to be located on South King Street at either 8th Avenue South or at 12th Avenue South in Little Saigon and estimated to cost $800,000, have been on hold since 2010.

== See also ==
- 2008 in art
- History of Chinese Americans in Seattle
