= Donnie Chin International Children's Park =

Park in Chinatown–International District, Seattle, Washington, U.S.

- International District Children's Park; International Children's Park; Dragon Park
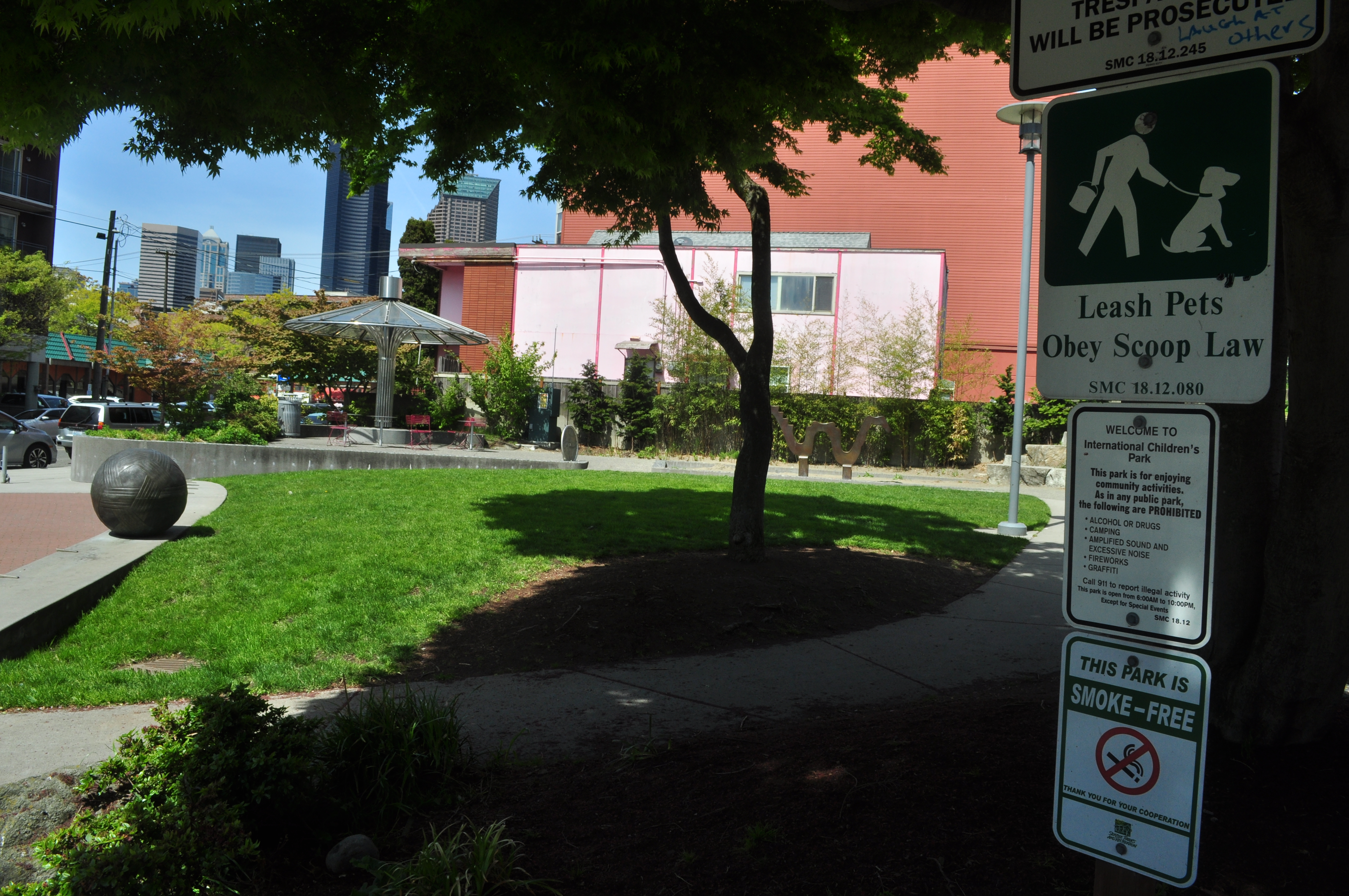
- Donnie Chin International Children's Park (2019)
- Interactive map of Donnie Chin International Children's Park
- Location: 700 S Lane St
- Nearest city: Seattle, Washington
- Coordinates: 47.596870°N 122.323529°W
- Area: 0.2 acres (0.081 ha)
- Created: 1981
- Designer: Joey Ing; Thomas Berger (landscape); Karen Kiest (2012 redesign)
- Owner: City of Seattle
- Website: seattle.gov/parks/find/parks/donnie-chin-international-childrens-park

Donnie Chin International Children's Park, formerly known as the International District Children's Park or International Children's Park, is a 0.2-acre (810 m^{2}) public park for children in the Chinatown–International District (CID) neighborhood of downtown Seattle, Washington, United States. Named after community leader Donnie Chin, the park is at the northeast corner of the intersection of South Lane Street and 7th Avenue South, near the eastern edge of the CID. It was built in 1981, renovated in 2012, and features a bronze dragon play sculpture by Gerard Tsutakawa.

== Features and description ==
The affectionate nickname "Dragon Park" derives from The Dragon, a bronze dragon sculpture and play structure created by Tsutakawa in 1978 under a commission from the Parks Department. The original circular center of the park was divided into a yin-yang shape, with the southern half as a grass lawn and the northern half as a sand play area. The bronze dragon was originally located in the sand portion. The northeastern corner of the original park featured "The Mountain", a small rock hill for climbing with a slide from the top into the sand area, connected by a bridge on the eastern edge of the park to another pile of rocks and a play structure in the southeastern corner. The northwest corner had a "Neon Pavilion" with seating, and the southwest corner (at the corner of 7th and Lane) had a large stone berm/planter.

The park was updated in 2012, removing the berm/planter in the southwest corner and rearranging elements of the play structures. "The Mountain" was replaced by seating.

== History ==
Land for the International Children's Park was donated by Dennis Su in the late 1970s. The original design for the park is credited to Joey Ing and the landscape architect Thomas Berger. The original International Children's Park opened in 1981. Because of poor visibility from the street and potential safety issues, the park was underutilized.

=== Renovation ===
In 2007, the community organization Friends of International Children's Park (FICP) was formed to explore options to update the park's design. FICP partnered with the Department of Landscape Architecture at the University of Washington (led by Professor Jeff Hou) and the Wilderness Inner-city Leadership Development (WILD) program for a collaborative exploration of potential designs. The redesign emphasized making the park more inviting for adults accompanying children to the park. In 2008, $500,000 to restore the park was authorized by the Parks and Green Spaces levy, which also provided $3 million for the Hing Hay Park expansion. In total, the redesign cost $750,000, with the balance made up by donors.

The draft design concepts for International Children's Park were finished by the landscape architect Karen Kiest. Several design workshops were held in 2009 to present three concepts for community review and comment; Kiest planned to retain most of the existing trees along the north and east edges of the park and expand the southwest corner as a curb extension. The final developed concept relocated the dragon to the northern edge of the park and kept the play structures along the eastern edge, allowing for a potential future expansion should the narrow parking lot east of the park be acquired by the city. The renovation also added new artistic elements from Stuart Nakamura based on toys from the Asia-Pacific cultures of the Chinatown-International District: "Spin" (a spinning top in stainless steel), "I-Ching Coin", and "SepakTakraw Ball". The grand re-opening of the park was held on March 3, 2012.

=== Donnie Chin ===
Donald Gregory (Donnie) Chin (October 7, 1955 – July 23, 2015) founded the International District Emergency Center (IDEC) with childhood friend and photojournalist Dean Wong in 1968 as police and fire services were generally slow to respond to emergency calls in the CID. Chin provided first responder services through IDEC on a volunteer basis for decades until he was shot and killed during a suspected gun battle between two rival groups in the early morning of July 23, 2015. The murder is still unsolved.

Spontaneous tributes to Chin following his death included a "crossed-ladder" salute from the Seattle Fire Department and flowers left at his family's shop in Canton Alley. Mayor Ed Murray, Governor Jay Inslee, and former King County Executive Ron Sims also paid tribute to Chin. Seattle's Organization of Chinese Americans (OCA) launched a campaign to rename the International District Children's Park to Donnie Chin International Children's Park in February 2016. Chin was called "instrumental in the creation of the [original] park", as he had identified the need for a children's park in the CID during the 1970s. In June 2016, the Seattle City Council voted unanimously to rename the park, making an exception for Chin, as typical city park policy requires renaming requests to wait until three years after death.

== See also ==
- Canton Alley
