= Jamie Ford =

American writer

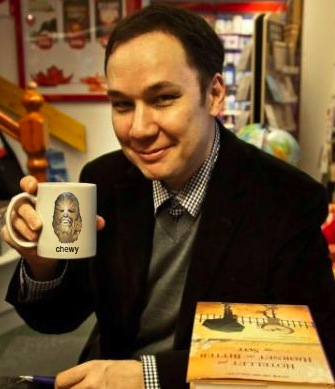
- Born: July 9, 1968 (age 58); Eureka, CA
- Occupation: Author
- Writing career
- Language: English
- Genres: Literary fiction, historical fiction, speculative fiction
- Notable works: Hotel on the Corner of Bitter and Sweet, Songs of Willow Frost
- Website: www.jamieford.com

Jamie Ford (born July 9, 1968) is an American author. He is best known for his debut novel, Hotel on the Corner of Bitter and Sweet. The book spent 130 weeks on the New York Times Bestseller List, and was also awarded best "Adult Fiction" book at the 2010 Asian/Pacific American Awards for Literature. The book was also named the No. 1 Book Club Pick for Fall 2009/Winter 2010 by the American Booksellers Association.

In 2013, Ford released his second book, Songs of Willow Frost.

His stories have also been included in Secret Identities: The Asian American Superhero Anthology and The Apocalypse Triptych, a series of three anthologies of apocalyptic and post-apocalyptic fiction where Ford wrote Asian-themed steampunk. The collections were edited by John Joseph Adams and Hugh Howey.

== Early life ==
Jamie Ford was born on July 9, 1968, in Eureka, California, but grew up in Ashland, Oregon, and Port Orchard and Seattle, Washington. His father, a Seattle native, is of Chinese ancestry, while Ford's mother is of European descent.

His Western last name "Ford" comes from his great-grandfather, Min Chung (1850–1922), who immigrated to Tonopah, Nevada in 1865 and later changed his name to William Ford. Ford's great-grandmother, Loy Lee Ford, was the first Chinese woman to own property in Nevada.

== Career ==
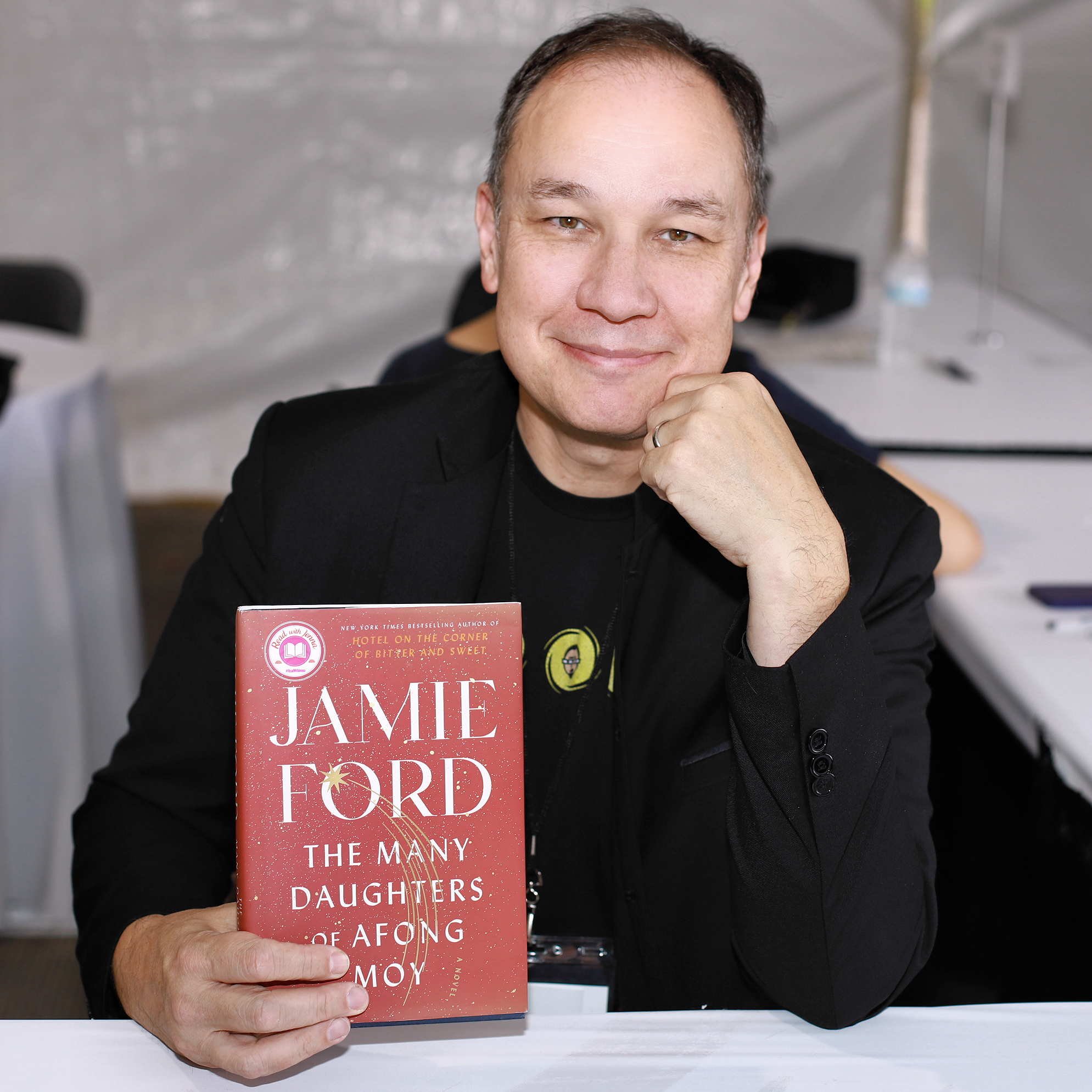
Ford at the 2022 Texas Book Festival.

Ford is best known for his debut novel, Hotel on the Corner of Bitter and Sweet. The book received positive reviews after its release, and was also awarded best "Adult Fiction" book at the 2010 Asian/Pacific American Awards for Literature.

In 2013, he released his second book, Songs of Willow Frost.

In 2017, his third novel, Love and other Consolation Prizes was released.

In 2018, ArtsFund presented him with their annual award for Outstanding Contribution to the Arts.

Atria Books released Ford's next novel The Many Daughters of Afong Moy in August 2022.

== Books ==
=== Hotel on the Corner of Bitter and Sweet ===
Ford's first book, Hotel on the Corner of Bitter and Sweet, was published on February 1, 2009. The novel received numerous awards after its publication. The most notable awards came in 2010, when the book was the winner in the "Adult Fiction" category at the 2010 Asian/Pacific American Award for Literature, and was a runner-up for the 2009 Langum Prize for historical fiction. It was also named the No. 1 Book Club Pick for Fall 2009/Winter 2010 by the American Booksellers Association.

The book is set mainly in the Nihonmachi and Chinatown-International District areas of Seattle, Washington. It switches between two different narratives of a Chinese-American named Henry Lee, each one taking place at different points of his lifetime. The first narrative, taking place in 1942 just after the United States has entered World War II, focuses on Henry's struggles with the racism towards Chinese and Japanese-Americans that was commonplace during that time period and his relationship with a Japanese-American girl named Keiko Okabe. The second narrative, also taking place mainly in the Chinatown-International District, is set in 1986, focusing mainly on an older Henry in his late fifties as he attempts to reconnect with his grown son, Marty, after the death of his wife Ethel.

The book was part of various selections and picks in the media which included the IndieBound NEXT List Selection, a Borders Original Voices Selection, a Barnes & Noble Book Club Selection, Pennie's Pick at Costco, a Target Bookmarked Club Pick, and a National Bestseller.

The novel received positive reviews, including from the New York Times and the author Lisa See. Seattle author Garth Stein commented, "A tender and satisfying novel set in a time and a place lost forever, Hotel on the Corner of Bitter and Sweet gives us a glimpse of the damage that is caused by war—not the sweeping damage of the battlefield, but the cold, cruel damage to the hearts and humanity of individual people. Especially relevant in today's world, this is a beautifully written book that will make you think. And, more importantly, it will make you feel." Lisa See said the novel explores "old conflicts between father and son", while the book was "an impressive, bitter, and sweet debut." Goodreads gave the novel a rating of 4 out of 5 stars, with over 100,000 votes. The book also received positive reviews from Kirkus Reviews. As of August 10, 2018, the book had 3082 reviews on Amazon.com, with 4.6 out of a possible 5 stars.

Hotel on the Corner of Bitter and Sweet has been translated into 35 languages.

=== Songs of Willow Frost ===
On September 10, 2013, Ford released his second novel, Songs of Willow Frost which debuted at No. 11 on the New York Times bestseller list. After the books release it received mainly positive reviews, with Barnes & Noble readers rating the book 4.5 out of 5 in November 2013.

The book is the story of a twelve-year-old orphaned Chinese American boy named William. It is set in Seattle's Chinatown in the 1920s and 1930s and is alternately told from his mother's perspective and from William's. The book is also laced with details about life in Seattle in the 1920s and 1930s. The book references a number of historical figures, including "Rum King" Roy Olmstead and filmmaker Nell Shipman. There also a host of references to gone-but-not-quite-forgotten places including the Meadows Race Track, Frederick & Nelson and Seattle's Film Row. Shortly after release, the book made it through to the second round of the 2013 Goodreads Choice Awards in the category of historical fiction. As of August 10, 2018 the book had 684 reviews on Amazon averaging 4.1 of 5 stars.

=== Love and Other Consolation Prizes ===
At Seattle's 1909 World's Fair, a young boy named Earnest was auctioned off. Little, if any, more is known about him. Jamie Ford has given him a family name, Young, a girl friend, a life in the 'tenderloin' district of Seattle, and later a wife and daughters. As of August 10, 2018, the book has 275 reviews on Amazon averaging 4.4 of 5 stars.

=== The Many Daughters of Afong Moy ===
An epigenetic love story, beginning with Afong Moy, the first Chinese woman in America that follows her descendants to the year 2043. The novel was an instant New York Times bestseller and a Read With Jenna book club pick. As of March 14, 2025, the book has 3,077 reviews on Amazon averaging 4.2 of 5 stars.

== Personal ==
Ford married Leesha Procopio on August 8, 2008, at 8:08 pm in Ashland, Oregon, the number eight being a Chinese lucky number.

Ford is a fan of Harlan Ellison and in 2012 bought Ellison's first typewriter, a 1938 Remington Wireless Portable.

Jamie Ford currently lives in Montana.
