= Viet-Wah =

Supermarket chain in the U.S. state of Washington

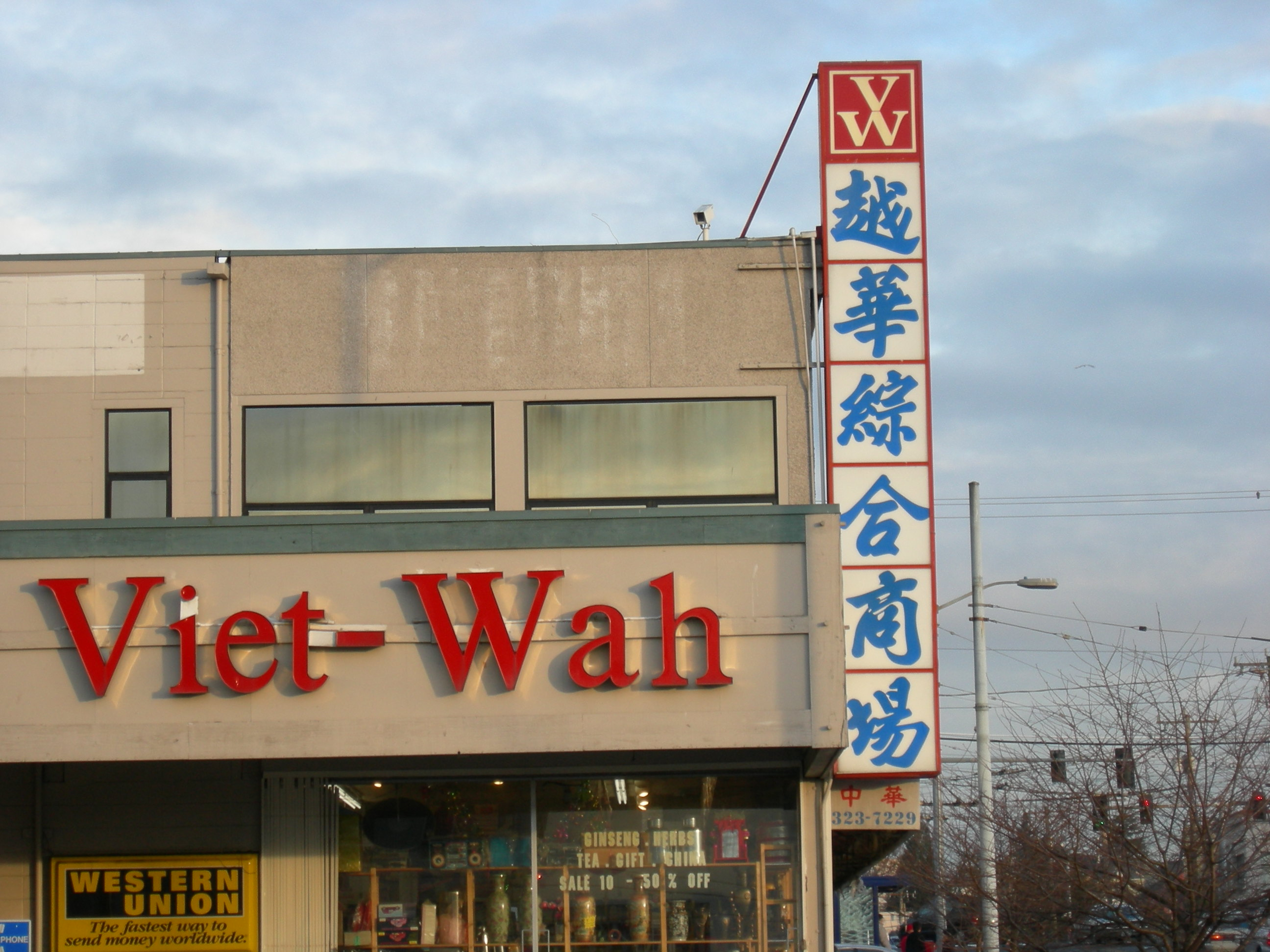
Exterior of the store in the Little Saigon part of Seattle's Chinatown–International District, 2006

Viet-Wah (traditional Chinese: 越華; simplified Chinese: 越华) is a chain of Asian / Vietnamese supermarkets in the Seattle metropolitan area, in the U.S. state of Washington. Established in 1981, the business specializes in Vietnamese, Chinese, and Thai products and such as duck and quail eggs, noodles, seafood, chicken hearts, and fish sauce.

== Locations ==
The original store, which operated on South Jackson Street in the Asian Plaza development of the Little Saigon part of Seattle's Chinatown–International District, closed in 2022. The 15,000-square-foot store had a pharmacy, tanks with live seafood, and kitchen supplies. Crosscut.com described the store as a pillar of Little Saigon. The building caught fire in 2024.

The location on Martin Luther King Jr. Way S closed in 2015. The business also operates in Renton.

== See also ==
- List of supermarket chains in the United States
