= Chinatown–International District, Seattle =

Historic district in Washington, United States

Coordinates: 47°35′51″N 122°19′15″W

- Seattle Chinatown Historic District
- U.S. National Register of Historic Places
- U.S. Historic district
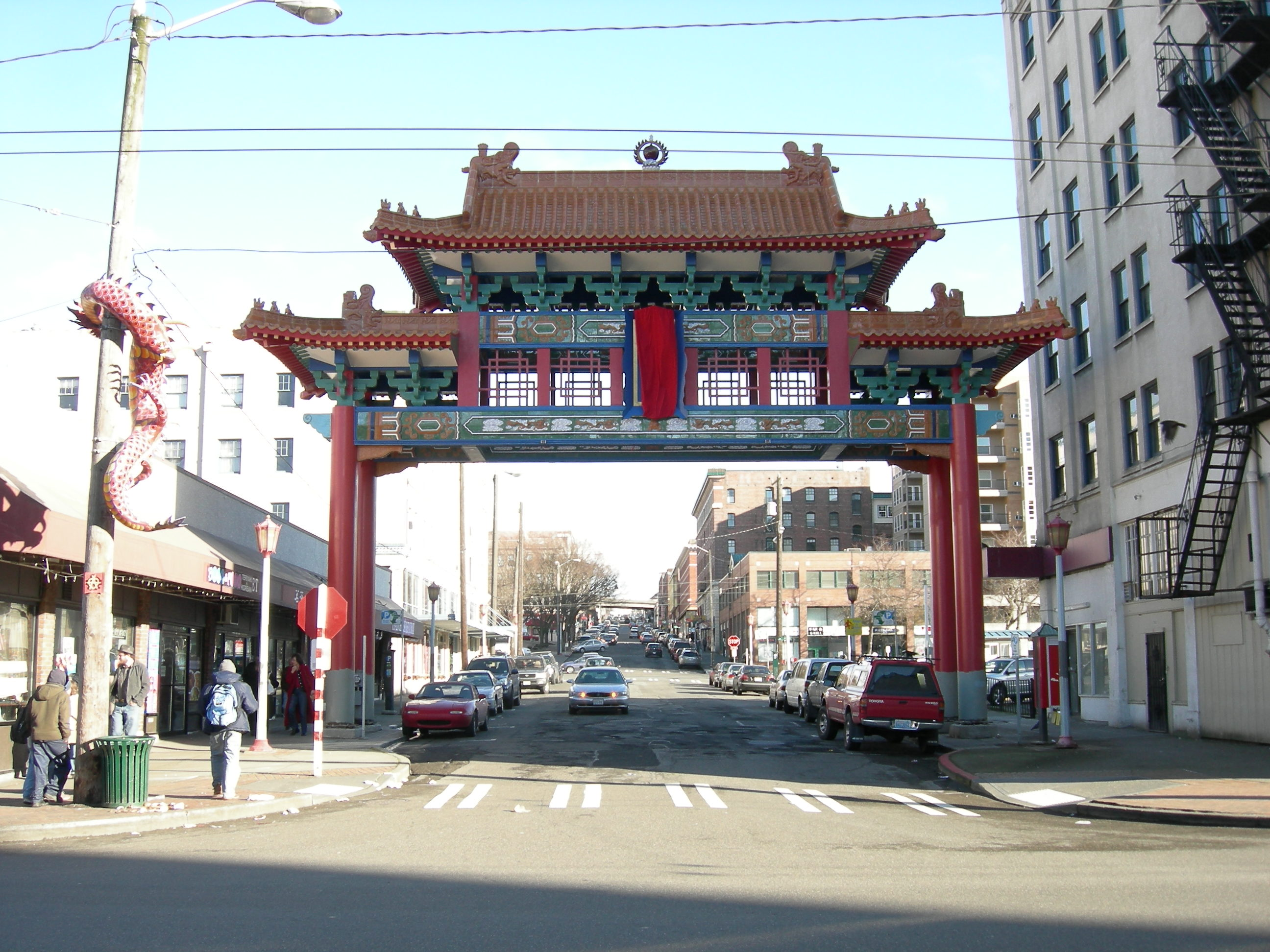
- Historic Chinatown Gate in the Seattle Chinatown Historic District

- Location within Downtown Seattle Location within Washington (state)
- Location: Roughly bounded by Yesler, Rainier, Dearborn, and Fourth, Seattle, Washington
- Area: 23 acres (9.3 ha)
- Architect: Multiple, including Sabro Ozasa, Charles Haynes, Thompson & Thompson
- Architectural style: Beaux Arts
- NRHP reference No.: 86003153
- Added to NRHP: November 6, 1986

The Chinatown–International District (abbreviated as CID) is a neighborhood of Seattle, Washington. It is the center of the city's Asian American community. Within the district are the three neighborhoods known as Chinatown, Japantown and Little Saigon, named for the concentration of businesses owned by people of Chinese, Japanese and Vietnamese descent, respectively. The geographic area also once included Manilatown.

It was the third community for the city's Chinese and Japanese immigrants, who were driven out of other locations around modern-day Pioneer Square during the late 19th century. A new Chinatown was established shortly after the Jackson Regrade in 1907, which leveled terrain near King Street Station, alongside a Japantown in the same vicinity. The city's Japantown declined following the internment of Japanese Americans during World War II, while Vietnamese immigration after the Vietnam War led to the establishment of Little Saigon in the 1970s. The construction of Interstate 5 through the neighborhood in the 1960s and the Kingdome nearby in 1976 led to further strain on the area.

The Seattle Chinatown Historic District was added to the National Register of Historic Places in 1986. The area was named the "International District" by the city government since the mid-20th century, but the term's use is controversial among the Chinese American community. Like many other areas of Seattle, the neighborhood is multiethnic, but the majority of its residents are of Chinese ethnicity. It is one of eight historic neighborhoods recognized by the City of Seattle. CID has a mix of residences and businesses and is a tourist attraction for its ethnic Asian culture and landmarks.

== Location ==
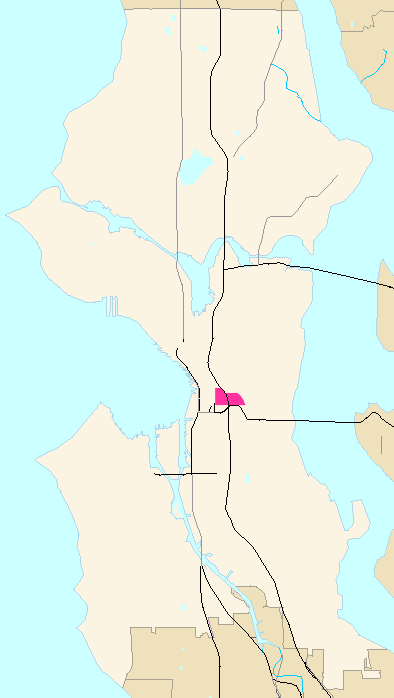
Location of Chinatown International District within Seattle.

The CID boundaries are defined as 4th Avenue South (on the west) to Rainier Avenue (on the east) and from Yesler Way (north) to Charles Street/Dearborn (south). The CID is bordered by the neighborhoods of Pioneer Square and SoDo to the west of 4th Ave S; Rainier Valley on the east side of Rainier; Beacon Hill and the Industrial District to the south of Charles/Dearborn; and downtown and First Hill to the north of Yesler.

Within the CID are three distinct neighborhoods: Chinatown, Japantown, and Little Saigon. The Seattle Chinatown Historic District, so designated by the U.S. National Register of Historic Places in 1986, is roughly south of Jackson and west of I-5, with Hing Hay Park at its heart. In the present day, Japantown is centered on 6th Avenue and Main Street and Little Saigon's main nexus is 12th Avenue South and South Jackson Street.

== History ==
=== Predecessors in Seattle ===
Chinese immigrants first came to the Pacific Northwest in the 1850s, and by the 1860s, some had settled in Seattle. The first in the city was Chin Chun Hock, a domestic worker who arrived in 1860 and later founded a general store and hotel. Many of the first Chinese immigrants to Washington came from Guangdong province, especially Taishan. By 1873, there was an estimated 100 Chinese residents in Seattle, out of the city's total population of 2,000. The first Chinese quarters were near Yesler's Mill on the waterfront, which included several business that opened in the late 1860s. The Chinese quarter grew to include residences and shifted uphill from the waterfront into leased buildings around Washington Street. The influx of Chinese immigrants was slowed by the Chinese Exclusion Act of 1882. Following an economic crisis a few years later, a group of white Seattle residents drove out the city's Chinese population in February 1886. However, some took shelter with Native Americans on the reservations while others came under the protection of white employers and a judge.

The Great Seattle Fire of 1889 further hindered the community. Eventually, the Chinese re-established new quarters farther inland, along Washington St. and Second Avenue South. This was the second Chinatown. Land values rose, especially with impending construction of the Smith Tower, and the people of Chinatown moved again, to the present and third location along King Street. Only the Hop Sing Tong managed to retain its building on 2nd and Washington. It sold this building about 2006 in order to purchase the former China Gate building at 516 7th Ave S in the current Chinatown.

Near the end of the 19th century, Japanese immigrants also began arriving, settling on the south side of the district on the other side of the railroad tracks. Part of present-day Dearborn Street, between 8th and 12th avenues, was known as Mikado Street, after the Japanese word for "emperor." Japanese Americans developed Nihonmachi, or Japantown, on Main Street, two blocks north of King Street. By the mid-1920s, Nihonmachi extended from 4th Avenue along Main to 7th Avenue, with clusters of businesses along Jackson, King, Weller, Lane, and Dearborn streets.

=== 20th century ===
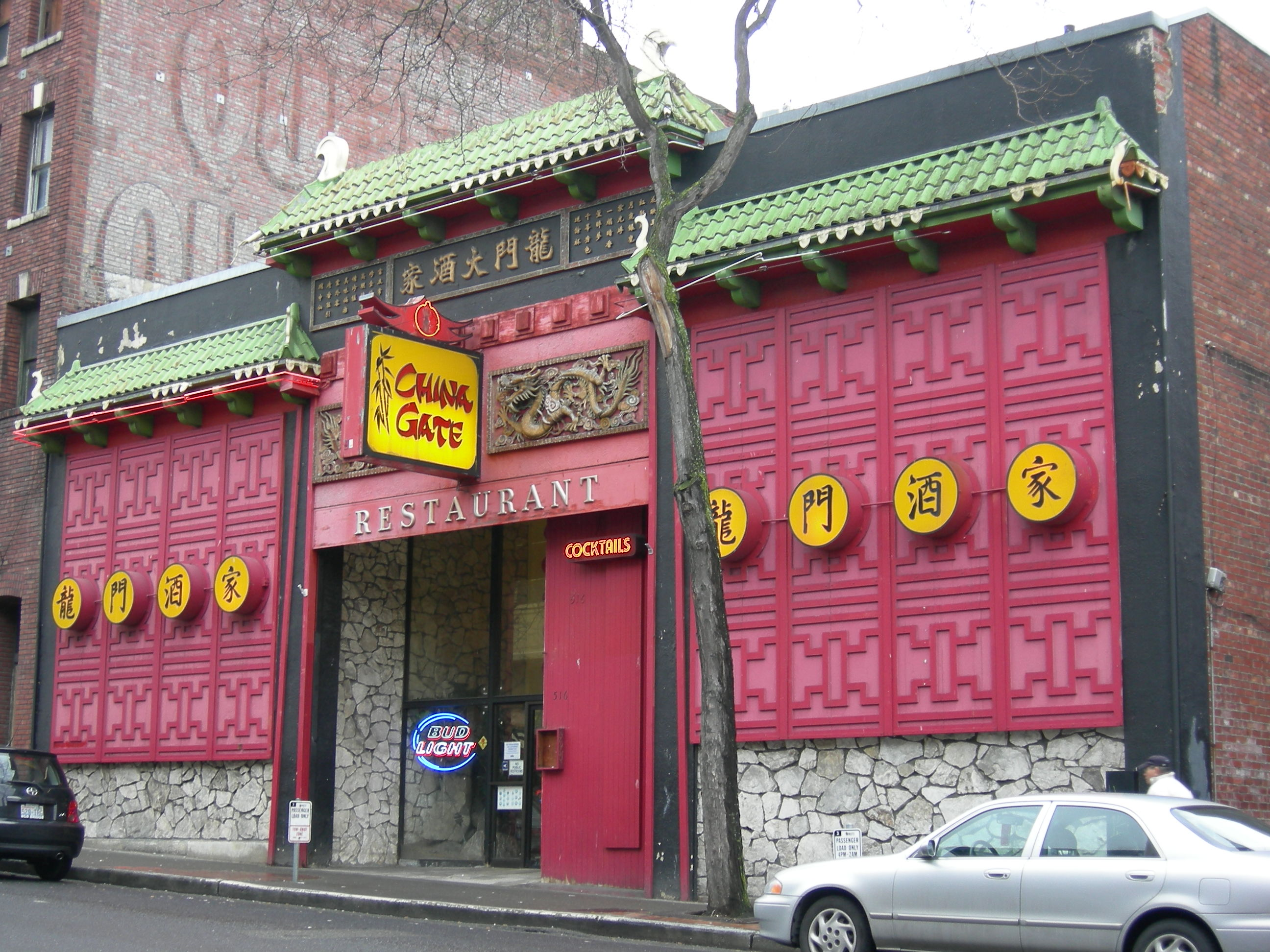
516 7th Ave S was originally built in 1924 as the Chinese Grand Opera Theater to house a Peking Opera company.

The Jackson Regrade began in 1907; workers leveled hills and used the resulting fill to reclaim tidal flats, making travel to downtown easier. As downtown property values rose, the Chinese were forced to other areas. By the early 1900s, a new Chinatown began to develop along King Street. In 1910, Goon Dip, a prominent businessman in Seattle's Chinese American community, led a group of Chinese Americans to form the Kong Yick Investment Company, a benefit society. Their funding and efforts led to the construction of two buildings—the East Kong Yick Building and the West Kong Yick Building.

Meanwhile, Filipino Americans began arriving to replace the Chinese dock workers, who had moved inland. According to Pamana I, a history of Filipino Americans in Seattle, they settled along First Hill and the hotels and boarding houses of Chinatown and Japantown beginning in the early 1920s. They were attracted to work as contract laborers in agriculture and salmon canneries. Among them was Filipino author Carlos Bulosan, who wrote of his experiences and those of his countrymen in his novel America Is In The Heart (1946). By the 1930s, a 'Manilatown' had been established near the corner of Maynard and King.

The Puget Sound Hotel on 6th Ave S and Dearborn Street, completed 1914. (Demolished 1990s). Featuring 444 rooms, it was the largest laborer hotel on the West Coast.

The Neon Sign for The Panama Hotel in 2007.

While the building type itself cannot be traced back to origins of China, Japan, or the Philippines, Single Room Occupancy (SRO) hotels were common, as the majority of settlers were not family units but single laborers. Due to the size and amenity restrictions, residents in these SRO dwellings would have relied on local restaurants, bath houses, and barbershops to satisfy daily needs. Such businesses were often located in the ground floor of SROs. Though this building type was not specific to the International District at this point in history, those located in the area were modified with distinct features, such as ornamented balconies, which can still be noted today. The East Kong Yick building is one such example, with a recessed balcony on the second story. The historically desgnated Panama Hotel, which featured a bathhouse, is another notable surviving example of this vernacular architecture. Other distinct vernacular building types began to appear at this time such as community halls, language schools, and both temples and churches.

In 1942, under the auspices of Executive Order 9066, the federal government forcibly removed and detained people of Japanese ancestry from Seattle and the West Coast in the wake of the attack on Pearl Harbor. Authorities moved them to inland internment camps, where they lived from 1942 to 1946. Most of Seattle's Japanese residents were sent to Minidoka in Idaho. After the war, many returned to the Pacific Northwest but relocated to the suburbs or other districts in Seattle. A remaining vestige of the old community is the office of the North American Post, a Japanese-language newspaper founded in 1902. Another is the Panama Hotel, which was proclaimed a National Treasure in 2015 with a prior listing on the U.S. National Register of Historic Places. Maneki, one of the oldest Japanese restaurants in the United States, reopened in its storage space after its original building was looted and vandalized during the war. Uwajimaya, originally a Japantown store, moved down the hill into Chinatown.

African Americans moved to Seattle in the Great Migration, mostly out of the South, to work in the war industry during World War II, occupying many of the houses left vacant by the internment of the Japanese Americans. They filled the empty businesses along Jackson Street with notable jazz clubs.

In 1951, Seattle Mayor William D. Devin proclaimed the area "International Center" because of the diversity of people who resided and worked in the vicinity. Businesswoman and later city councilwoman Ruby Chow and others criticized the use of "international" for masking Chinese American history. The use of "International District" by the city remains controversial.

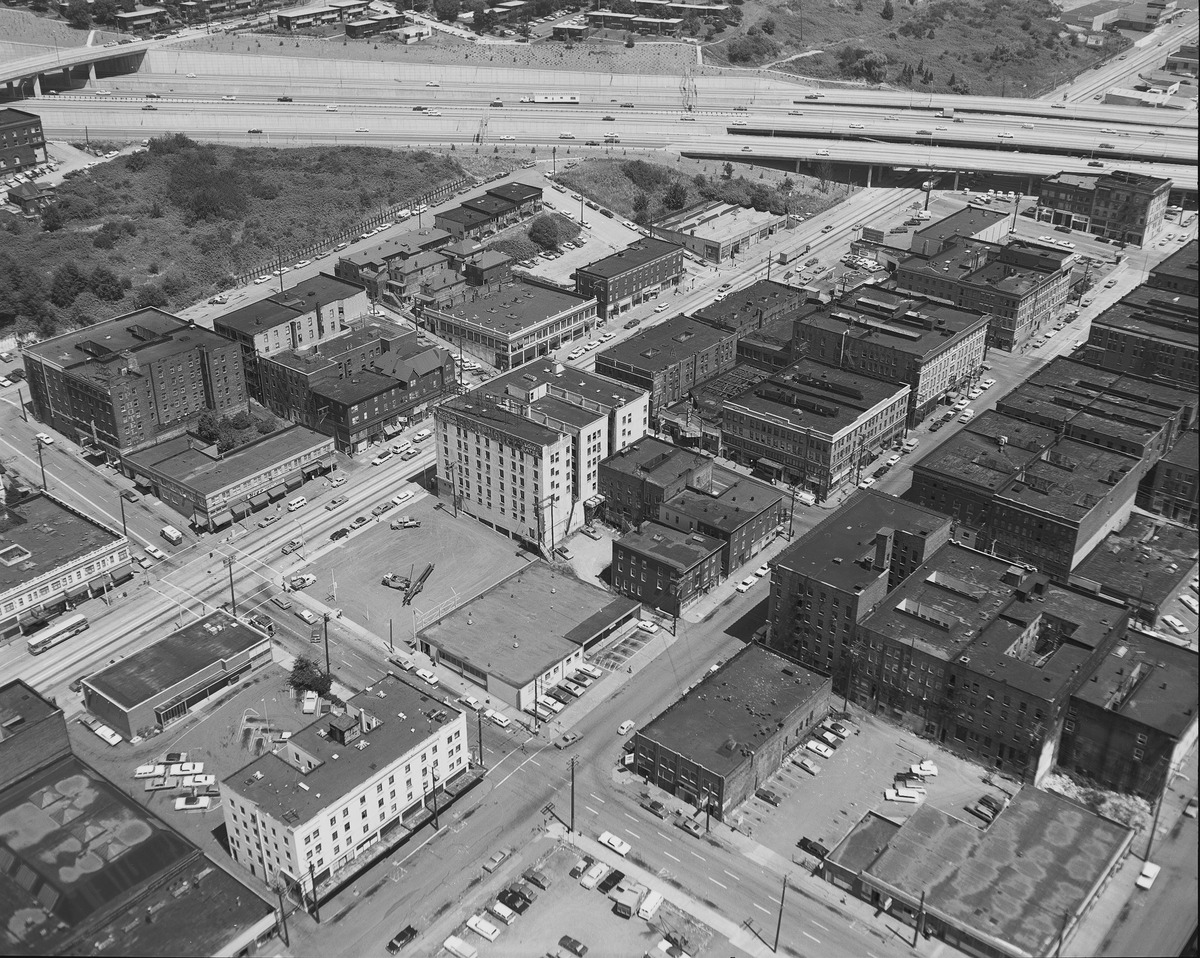
Aerial photograph of the CID in 1969, facing northeast. Prominent east–west streets (running from lower left to upper right) are Jackson (background) and King (foreground). I-5 at top of photograph.

Seattle's first neighborhood advocacy group, the Jackson Street Community Council, opposed the construction of an interstate highway through the area. Despite protest, many Chinese and Japanese buildings and businesses were destroyed for the construction of Interstate 5 in the 1960s. Ethnic Asians formed new civic organizations (as compared to the traditional Chinese family associations, tongs and social clubs) serve needs ranging from community health, care of the elderly, information and referrals, counseling, historic preservation, marketing of the area, and building low-income housing. The construction of the Kingdome in 1972 further boxed in the neighborhood, leading to renewed protests over the community's lack of representation, including an impromptu demonstration at the stadium's groundbreaking ceremony on November 2, 1972.

With the fall of Saigon in 1975, a new wave of immigrants from Vietnam and Southeast Asia established Seattle's Little Saigon east of I-5. Many of these immigrants were of Chinese descent. Vietnamese pho was introduced to the city in 1982 with the opening of Phở Bắc, a restaurant most famous for its boat-like shape. Meanwhile, Little Saigon gained its first grocery store with the opening of Viet-Wah in 1981; it was joined by Lam's Seafood Market in 1991 and Hau Hau Market in 1995.

The worst mass murder in the history of Seattle took place at the Wah Mee Club on Maynard Alley on February 18, 1983. Thirteen people were killed.

In 1986, a portion of Chinatown and Japantown was listed on the National Register of Historic Places as the "Seattle Chinatown Historic District." That year the Wing Luke Memorial Museum moved to 7th Avenue, a location it would occupy for two decades.

In 1999, the City Council approved the "Chinatown/International District Urban Village Strategic Plan" for the future of the neighborhood. This plan, agreed to by all major organizations in the CID, led to City Ordinance 119297. This ordinance enshrined the three neighborhoods of Chinatown, Japantown, Little Saigon and the Chinatown Historic District into one larger neighborhood with a compromised name. Since then, the often conflicting interests of development, preservation and the conversion of old buildings to low-income housing have clashed as office developments (e.g., Union Station) and market-rate housing developments are overwhelmed by drastic increases in low-income housing stock. In addition, controversy erupted over vacating S. Lane Street as part of a large redevelopment by the private business Uwajimaya. Protesters formed the Save Lane Street organization and insisted as business owners they supported re-development, but opposed vacating a public street for a private business use. After losing a lawsuit filed over the matter, the Save Lane Street group dissolved. Activist groups also fought an attempt to build a McDonald's at the entrance of the neighborhood, which resulted in the company's withdrawal.

=== 21st century ===
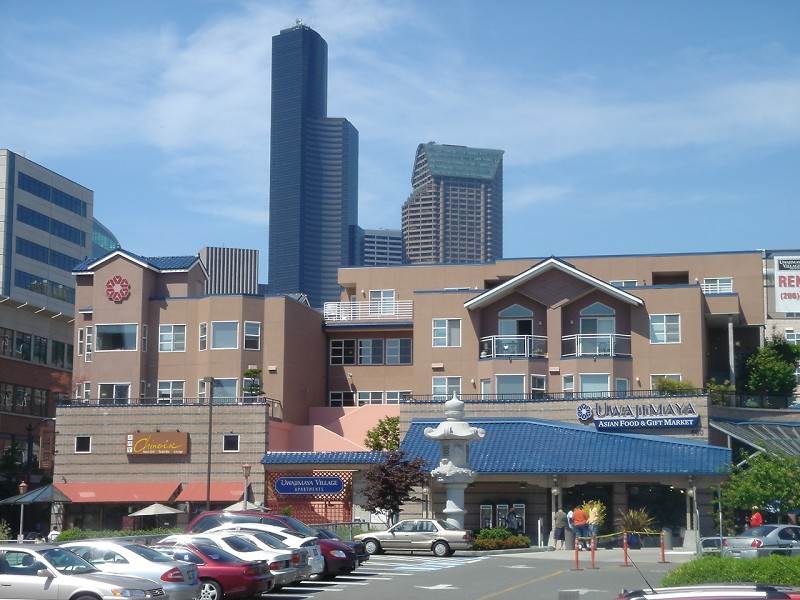
Uwajimaya, 2005

Construction on a paifang for the neighborhood began in 2006 and the Historic Chinatown Gate was unveiled on February 9, 2008. It stands at the west end of South King Street. It is 45 feet tall and made from steel and plaster. The Wing Luke Museum moved to the East Kong Yick Building in 2008.

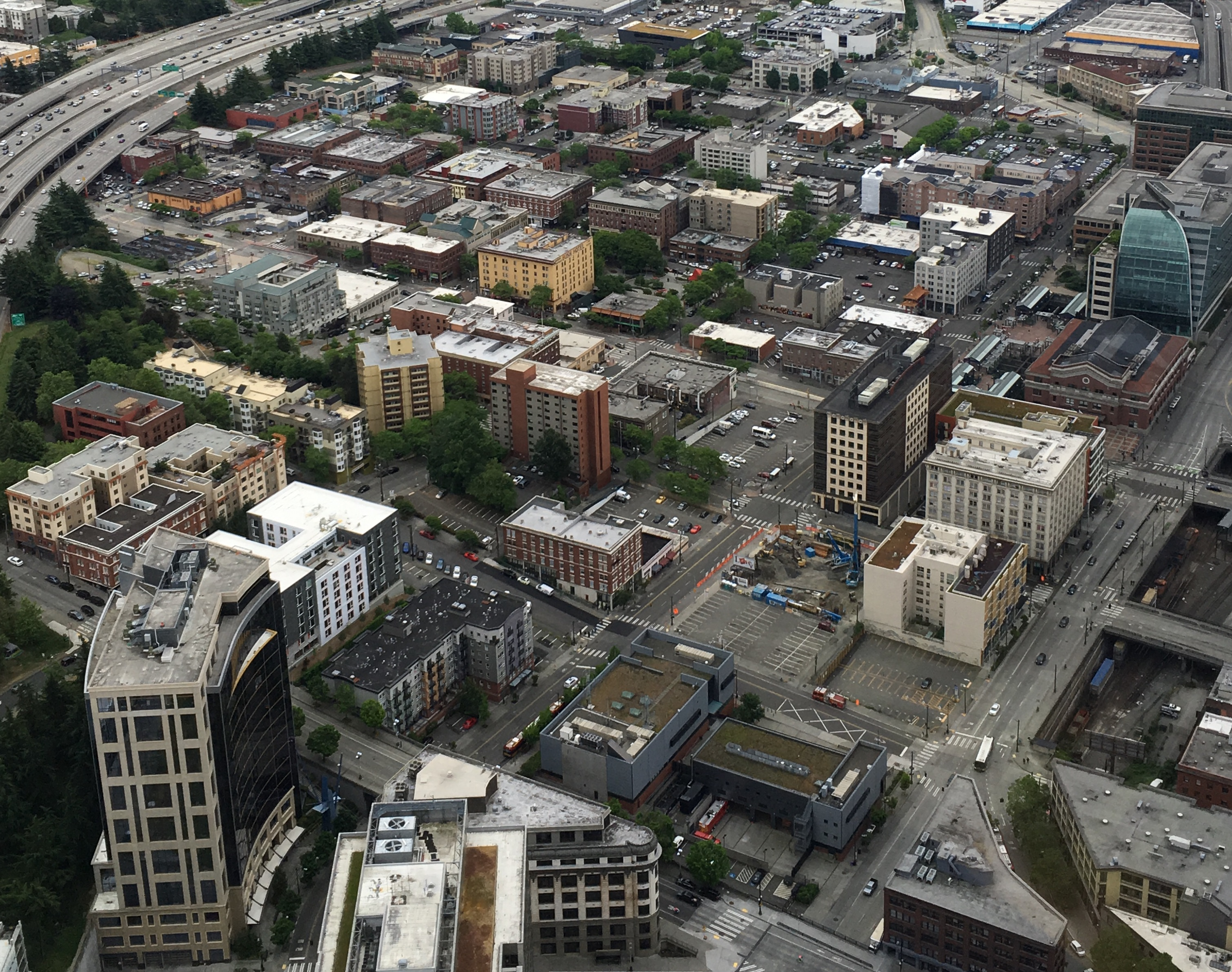
The Japantown and Chinatown portions of the neighborhood, as seen from the Columbia Center in 2019

As part of projects intended to maintain the identity of the neighborhood, the Seattle Department of Transportation installed bilingual street name signs at its intersections starting in the summer of 2013. The Chinatown and Japantown neighborhoods received them with the initial installation; the Little Saigon neighborhood did not have the signs installed until August 2016. The signs feature a top section with the street's legal English names in white on a green background and a bottom section with white translated text in the neighborhoods' respective native languages on a brown background; traditional Chinese is featured in Chinatown while Japanese is featured in Japantown, with Vietnamese featured in Little Saigon.

On February 28, 2019, police officers arrested five spa owners/operators and conducted a raid on 11 massage parlors, the majority of them on South Jackson Street within the neighborhood, in connection with an investigation into an alleged prostitution and money-laundering scheme that began in January 2015. 26 Chinese women, ranging in age from their late 20s to early 60s, were removed from the parlors; many of them were new arrivals that were not fluent in English. According to police and court documents, many of the women worked 14-hour shifts for six to seven days per week in decrepit conditions.

==== Rise of homelessness and exodus ====
The neighborhood has experienced gentrification since the early 2000s owing to a dramatic increase in overall demand for real estate development in the city. A May 2016 report from the National Coalition of Asian Pacific American Community Development revealed that overall city rents outgrew incomes by 45 percent from 2000 to 2014. As a result, a significant portion of its long-time residents have been displaced from their residences due to their inability to pay the increased rent, subsequently enduring homelessness due to the insufficient amount of affordable housing in the neighborhood. The Nickelsville homeless encampment, established in 2008, moved in September 2014 to a site on South Dearborn Street opposite the onramp to northbound Interstate 5. The property owner evicted the encampment in February 2016 after its leader was ousted the year before due to on-site conflict, invalidating the agreement made with the owner; 16 remaining residents were cleared out peacefully on March 11.

In a bid to address the city's worsening homeless crisis, Mayor Ed Murray announced on February 8, 2017, that the city would open a 24/7 homeless shelter similar to the navigation center opened by officials in San Francisco in 2015. After a search dating back to the previous June, the city selected the Pearl Warren Building on 12th Avenue South in the Little Saigon area, which was already hosting a traditional men's homeless shelter at the time. The selection was received with mixed to negative reaction from the Little Saigon community; many in the community were surprised by the announcement, claiming that the city did not ask them for input. While members stated that they were understanding of the need to handle the crisis, they held concerns about the potential for crime and sanitation issues. Backlash from the community, which included letters sent to him and protests outside Seattle City Hall, prompted Murray to announce on April 24 that he would halt the project until he could devise a plan that would satisfy community members. The center opened on July 12 with 75 beds and within its assigned budget of $2.7 million.

Impromptu encampments were still prevalent within the neighborhood. After city officials cleared an encampment of around 20 shelters in a neighboring stairwell on April 22, 2020. Many campers migrated one block over to South Weller Street, which was lined with more than 30 shelters. The clearing occurred despite strict guidelines put in place with the COVID-19 pandemic due to the difficulty encountered by the Seattle Police Department in patrolling the stairwell. As of October 2022, there were 15 encampments around the area, with severe public safety issues surrounding their presence cited as a major reason for a mass exodus of businesses from the neighborhood. More than 19 businesses had shuttered operations in the area in that year, with Viet Wah's closure on September 30 among the most notable occurrences. In an editorial regarding the Little Saigon section for The Seattle Times, an executive director of a local nonprofit (that also elected to move out) argued that private developers were contributing to the exodus by neglecting to maintain their properties in seeking a market rebound. According to a 2021 economic study of the neighborhood section, it was “rated as having high risk for displacement” owing to rapid residential growth, with around 1,145 new housing units built over the past four years.

In 2023, it was the first neighborhood in the state to be included in the National Trust for Historic Preservation's annual list of America's 11 Most Endangered Historic Places. The Chinatown neighborhood in Philadelphia was also included in the list, with the organization noting that less than half of such neighborhoods were still remaining out of 83 identified nationwide.

== Culture ==
Selected locations in the Chinatown-International District
- Points of interest
- Parks and open spaces
- Shops and restaurants
1 Danny Woo Garden
2 Donnie Chin International Children's Park
3 Hing Hay Park
4 Historic Chinatown Gate
5 Nippon Kan Theatre
6 Kobe Terrace
7 Panama Hotel
8 Uwajimaya
9 Wing Luke Museum

The neighborhood hosts a Lunar New Year festival near the East Asian Lunar New Year; Dragon Fest, a pan-Asian American festival, during the summer; and a night market in early fall. The nonprofit Friends of Little Saigon hosts an annual Celebrate Little Saigon event that celebrates Vietnamese culture.

Certain neighborhood buildings in CID incorporate Chinese architectural designs such as balconies on the second or third floors or tile roofs. The neighborhood also has public art installations by artists such as George Tsutakawa and Norie Sato. Artists Meng Huang and Heather Presler installed Chinese dragon sculptures on lampposts along Jackson Street in 2002.

Notable businesses and landmarks include:

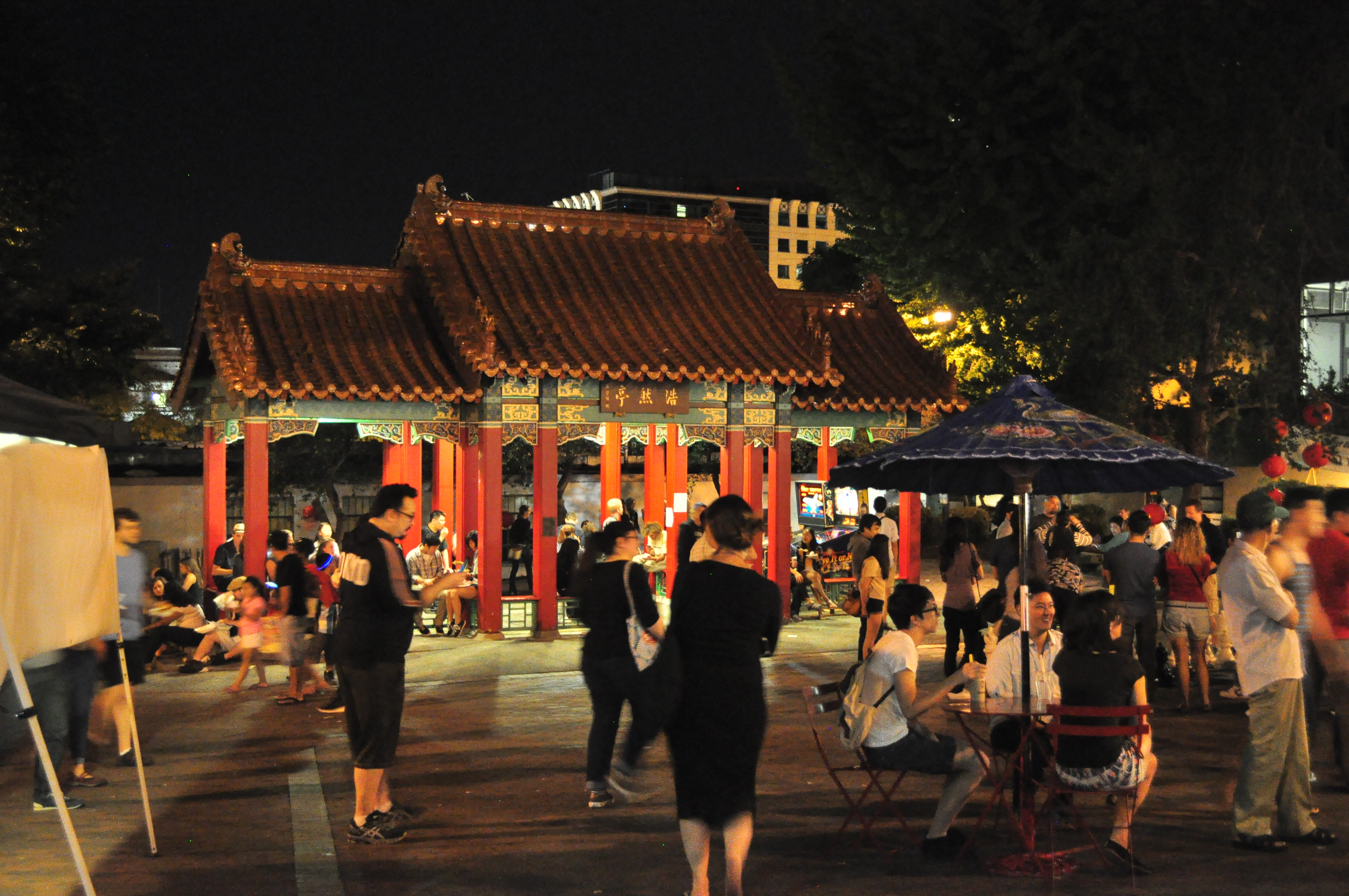
Night market at Hing Hay Park (2015)

- Danny Woo International District Community Garden
- Donnie Chin International Children's Park
- Hing Hay Park
- Historic Chinatown Gate
- Japanese Cultural and Community Center of Washington
- Nippon Kan Theater (closed)
- Kobe Terrace
- Panama Hotel
- Uwajimaya
- Wing Luke Museum

== Transportation ==
=== Public transit ===
The CID is a major hub for public transit in the Seattle metropolitan area with several services that converge on the neighborhood. The International District/Chinatown station in the Downtown Seattle Transit Tunnel is served by the 1 Line and 2 Line of the Link light rail system managed by Sound Transit. The First Hill Streetcar has three stops in the neighborhood on South Jackson Street at 5th Avenue South (near the light rail station), 7th Avenue South, and 12th Avenue South. King Street Station on the west side of 4th Avenue South is the sole intercity train station in Seattle; it is served by Amtrak and Sounder commuter rail. Several King County Metro and Sound Transit Express bus routes also travel through the CID, primarily on South Jackson Street, and provide frequent service.

== In popular culture ==
An independent film called The Paper Tigers, a martial arts comedy, was filmed in the Chinatown-International District. The district has a short appearance in the Naughty Dog's game The Last of Us Part II where players can visit the iconic Chinatown Gate.

== See also ==
- America's Most Endangered Places
- Festál at Seattle Center, a series of festivals celebrating the culture and contributions of Seattle's various Asian American and other ethnic communities
- History of Chinese Americans in Seattle
- History of the Japanese in Seattle
- Hoa Mai Park
- Wilderness Inner-City Leadership Development
