= Hotel on the Corner of Bitter and Sweet =

2009 novel by Jamie Ford

- Author: Jamie Ford
- Cover artist: Kathleen DiGrado
- Language: English
- Genre: Historical fiction
- Publisher: Ballantine Books
- English publication date: 1 February 2009
- Pages: 290
- ISBN: 0-345-50533-6

Hotel on the Corner of Bitter and Sweet is a historical novel by Jamie Ford. The story is told in two parallel storylines, one following 12-year-old Henry Lee's experiences during the Second World War, and the other depicting Henry 44 years later as a widower with a college-aged son. The plot centers around the forced evacuation of Japanese Americans to internment camps; the book depicts the pain and trauma of separation through the friendship of the Chinese-American Henry and his Japanese-American friend Keiko.

== Plot ==
Henry Lee, the son of Chinese parents in Seattle, Washington, is the only Asian child at his elementary school. His father makes him wear an "I Am Chinese" button so he will not be mistaken for a Japanese boy in the heightened racist climate of World War II Seattle. Henry is nevertheless bullied by his white classmates and must work long hours in the cafeteria dishing out meals and cleaning up to fulfill the terms of his scholarship. One day, a Japanese-American girl named Keiko Okabe joins him, also on scholarship. Henry and Keiko bond. When the residents of the city's Japantown are threatened with evacuation to internment camps, Henry safeguards Keiko's family's photo albums. He then travels with the lunch lady to serve meals at Camp Harmony, a temporary internment facility on the Western Washington Fairgrounds in Puyallup, Washington, where he sees her. With his friend, a local jazz musician named Sheldon, he also visits her in the Minidoka internment camp in Idaho. Visiting her there, he promises to wait for her until the war ends. They decide to write each other letters, and Henry returns to Seattle.

Henry's father is intent on sending him to China to complete his education in a traditional manner. Henry arrives home one day to find a new suit and a steamer ticket to China in his name. He agrees to go on the condition that his father (as part of an association of elders) saves the Panama Hotel from being sold. The Panama Hotel is where Keiko's family stored the greater part of their belongings when they were shipped to the internment camps. Many other families also stored their possessions in the basement of the Panama Hotel.

Though Henry writes many letters to Keiko, he receives very few in return. The mail clerk, a young girl around Henry's age, sympathizes with him, and when Keiko does not appear at the Panama Hotel for the last meeting Henry had tried to arrange with her on what turns out to be V-J Day, the mail clerk brings him his returned envelope with a bunch of star lilies. Henry turns his attention to the girl, named Ethel Chen, and eventually marries her. On his deathbed, Henry's father insinuates that he had something to do with stopping the correspondence between Henry and Keiko. Henry and Ethel celebrate their 30th wedding anniversary, after which Ethel falls ill with cancer for seven years and Henry devotedly cares for her in their home. Though he thinks often of Keiko, Henry never lets his wife know and is a caring and devoted husband till the end. Henry also supports his son Marty at college, and welcomes Marty's girlfriend, a non-Chinese girl named Samantha, into their family. The novel concludes with Henry's son Marty locating Keiko in New York City, and Henry goes to see her.

== Themes ==
The novel explores the themes of father–son relationships, and loyalty both in the familial and national contexts.

== Critical reception ==
Kirkus Reviews hailed the novel as "A timely debut that not only reminds readers of a shameful episode in American history, but cautions us to examine the present and take heed we don't repeat those injustices." Kevin Clouther of Booklist mentions that "Although Ford does not have anything especially novel to say about a familiar subject (the interplay between race and family), he writes earnestly and cares for his characters, who consistently defy stereotype."

The Seattle Times praised the book as "A wartime-era Chinese-Japanese variation on Romeo and Juliet ... The period detail [is] so revealing and so well rendered ... It's clear on every page how thoroughly Ford, who grew up here, did his research."

== Awards ==
- 2010 Asian/Pacific American Award for Literature
- 2010 Washington State Book Award Finalist
- 2009 Montana Book Award
- 2009 Borders Original Voices Selection
- 2009 Director's Mention, Langum Prize for American Historical Fiction
- 2009 One of BookBrowse's Top 3 Favorite Books

== Adaptations ==
In 2017, it was reported that a film was being planned, with Ford working on a screenplay.

In 2019, the rights to a musical adaptation were purchased by a composer and a choreographer.

Ford wrote a new short story, Only Keiko, to accompany the 10-year anniversary reissue of the novel.
