= Nippon Kan Theatre =

- Nippon Kan
- U.S. National Register of Historic Places
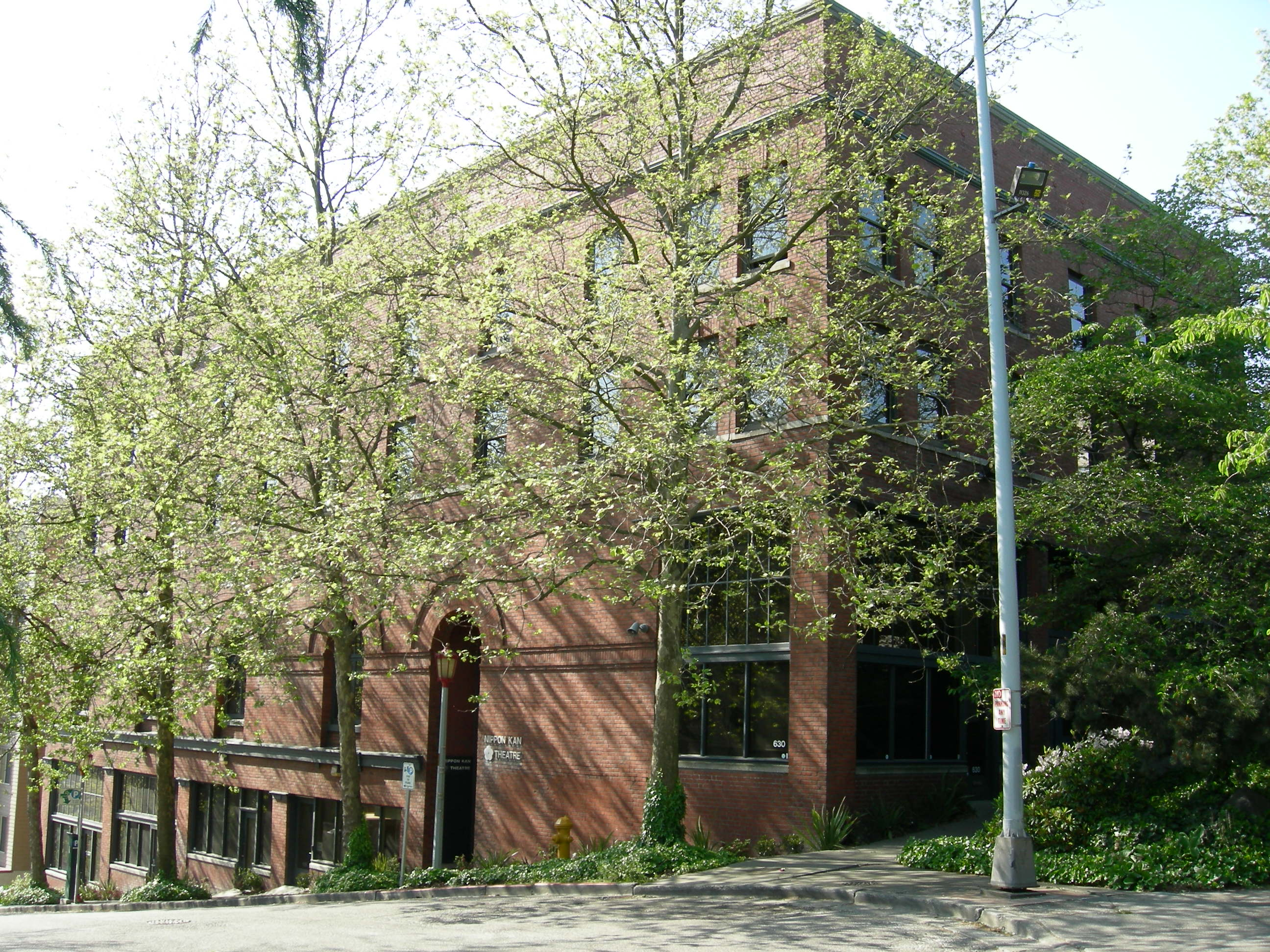
- The Nippon Kan building, seen from the southeast (2007)

- Location within Downtown Seattle
- Location: Seattle, Washington
- Coordinates: 47.601027°N 122.325387°W
- Built: 1909
- Architect: Thompson & Thompson
- Website: https://www.kobeparkevents.com/
- NRHP reference No.: 78002754
- Added to NRHP: May 22, 1978

The Nippon Kan Theatre (日本館劇場, Nippon-kan Gekijō) is a former Japanese theater in Seattle, Washington, United States. It is located in the Kobe Park Building at 628 S. Washington Street, in the Japantown section of Seattle's International District.

== History ==
The Nippon Kan Company was formed on January 30, 1908, by several leading businessmen of Seattle's Japanese community, including banker Tatsuya Arai and shipper Heiji Okuda, to fund the construction of a building that would serve as a meeting hall, theater and dormitory for new immigrants. The building, had it been completed on time, would have also served as an information center and rest stop for Japanese tourists coming to the city to visit the Alaska-Yukon Exposition. The Nippon Kan commissioned architects Thompson & Thompson to design a 4-story (including basement) building, containing retail facing Washington Street on the ground floor, a theater and more retail facing Maynard Avenue on the second floor and hotel rooms above. The same firm would be responsible for many buildings throughout the International District.

By the time construction finally started on the $80,000 building in 1909, the project was now under the control of the Japanese Association of Washington, with Charles T. Takahashi as president, Heiji Okuda as vice-president and S. Hyashi as treasurer. The building was officially dedicated in January 1910. Nippon Kan was initially the name of both the theater and the hotel in the building, though by 1912 the hotel was renamed the Astor, which it would remain until the late 1960s.

The Nippon Kan Theater served as a de facto Japanese community center in Seattle prior to World War II. It was busy several nights a week with actors and musicians from Japan, movies, concerts, judo and kendo competitions, and community meetings. The Asahi News, Seattle's only Japanese daily, was published in the building. The theater was boarded up in 1942 during the Japanese American internment, but reopened in 1981 through the restorative efforts of Seattle architect Edward M. Burke and his wife Betty. The building is listed on the National Register of Historic Places.

In 2005 it was sold to ABC Legal Services and was used as converted office space. A replica of the curtain hangs on the wall along with several historic photographs. Its original closure has been attributed to the decreasing number of people of Japanese descent in Seattle.

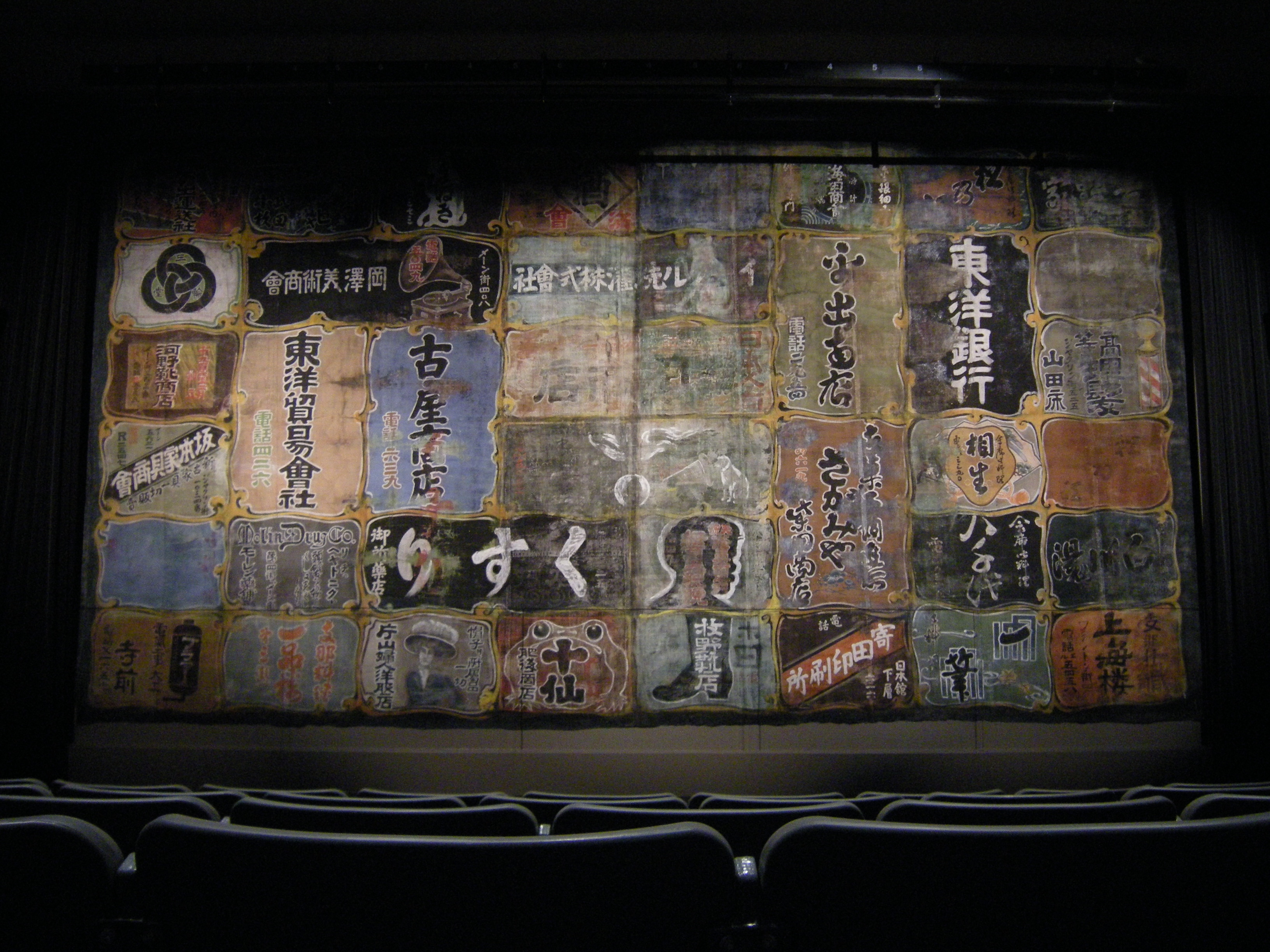
The Nippon Kan's 1909–1915 stage curtain is now used in the Tateuchi Story Theater, Wing Luke Museum.

The theater's original stage curtain (used 1909–1915) survives, and now serves a similar purpose on the stage of the Tateuchi Story Theater of the nearby Wing Luke Museum. The curtain covered with advertisements was rediscovered in the 1970s. Because it used an asbestos material, it is now encased in a resin.

In 2024, during a grand reopening event, Seattle mayor Bruce Harrell declared May 23 to be Nippon Kan Theatre Day.

== See also ==
- History of the Japanese in Seattle
