= Danny Woo International District Community Garden =

Garden in Seattle, Washington, United States

Coordinates: 47°36′01″N 122°19′31″W

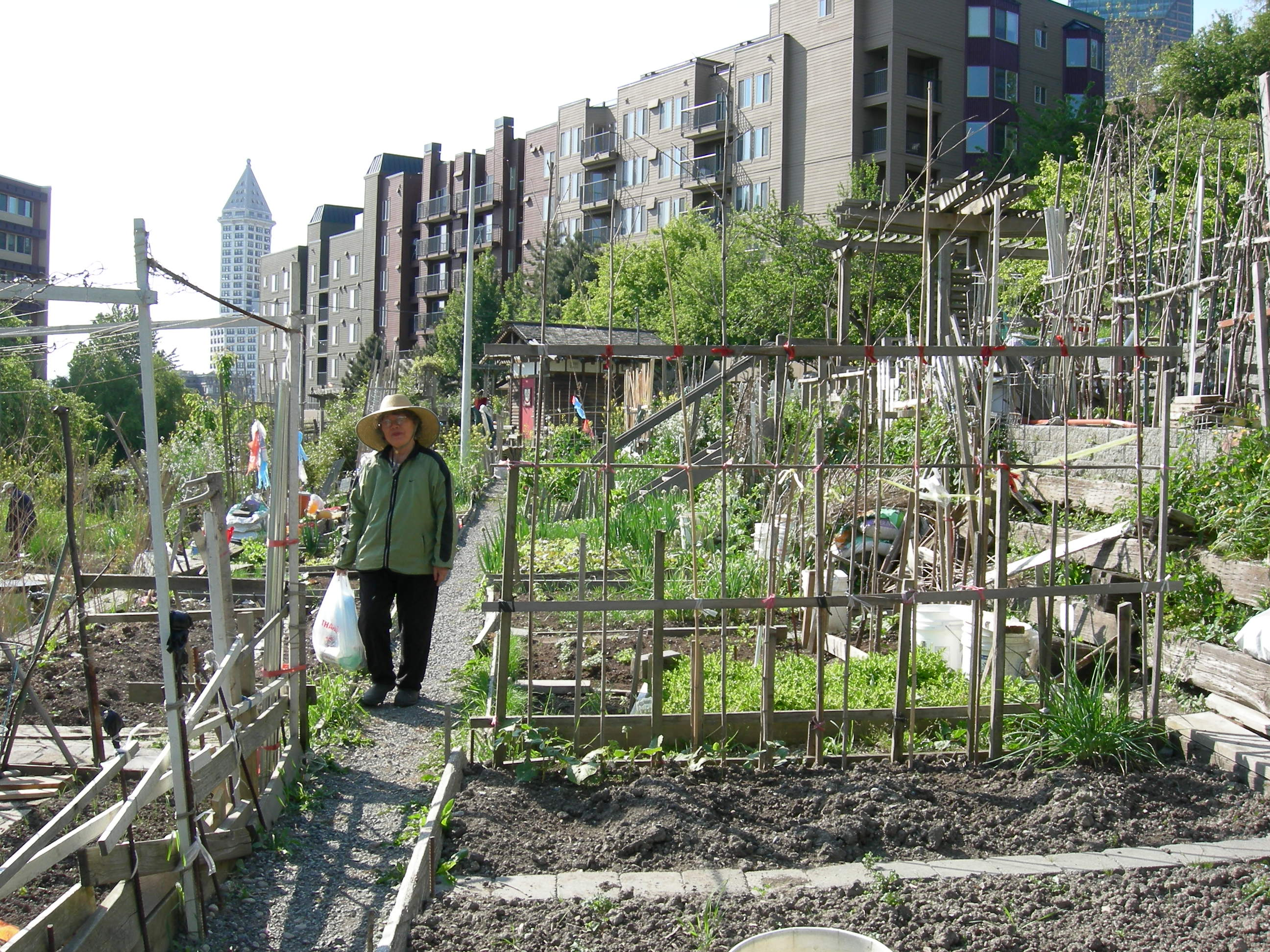
- Danny Woo International District Community Garden. The Smith Tower can be seen background left.
- Interactive map of Danny Woo International District Community Garden
- Type: Community garden
- Location: International District, Seattle, Washington, United States
- Open: 1975

The Danny Woo International District Community Garden is a community garden on the outskirts of the International District, Seattle, Washington. It was built in 1975 and provides 101 allotments and 77 fruit trees.

Allotment plots are allocated by preference to those aged over 65, residents of the International District, and those whose income is below 30% of the median. The garden is managed by the Inter*Im Community Development Association, a community development non-profit serving the Chinatown-International District. Much of the design in the garden has been through the efforts of UW architecture students. In their work, they were concerned in creating a natural and Asian environment.

At 1.5 acres – the Danny Woo International District Community Garden is the largest green space in Seattle's South Downtown. The garden serves over 70 low-income, primarily non-English speaking gardeners. The average age of the community gardeners is 76 years old.

While the gardens primarily serve low-income seniors, the Danny Woo International District Community Garden also has a Children's Garden in which 265 K-12 children go through Inter*Im's Seed-to-Plate program. The Seed-to-Plate program focuses on raising sustainable foods, promoting better nutritional choices, and teaching children the science behind food production. The gardens utilize over 300 volunteers to aid with its operations and programs and receives over 1,000 visitors annually.

In 2014, Inter*Im created a kitchen in the gardens to support their Seed-to-Plate program, as well as providing a venue for low-income community members.

== Description ==
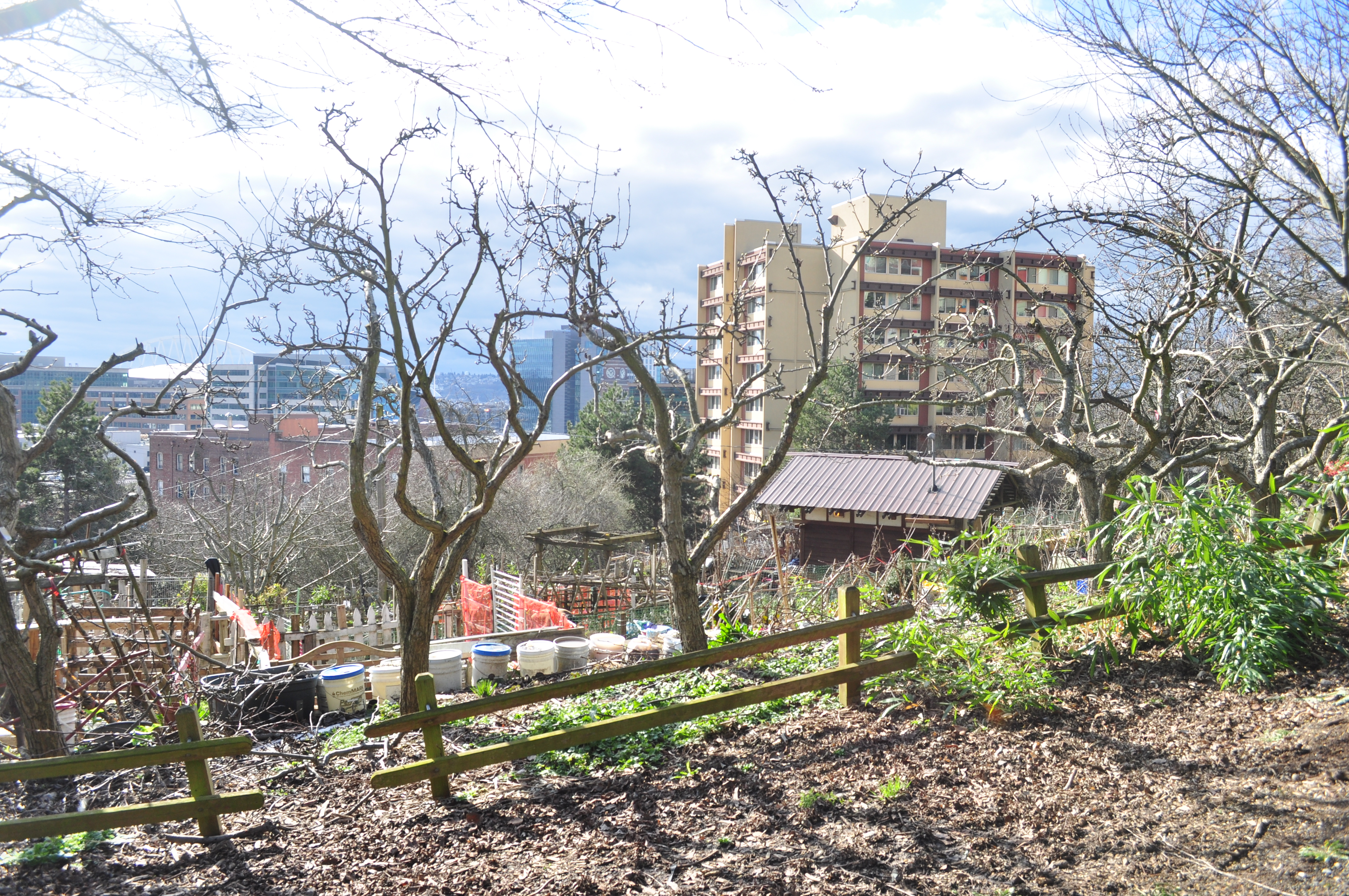
Danny Woo International District Community Gardens from Kobe Terrace Park, 2018

Tucked away on a sunny hillside overlooking the International District, a short walk from downtown Seattle, lies one of Seattle's largest and most unique community gardens. The Danny Woo International District Community Gardens was established in 1975 by InterIm Community Development Association and the efforts of countless volunteers. The garden's four terraces are surrounded by fruit trees and have many places for visitors to rest, gardeners to wash their vegetables, or tourists to take in the view. The view from the garden includes Elliott Bay, the Olympic mountains, the Port of Seattle, South Downtown, and Beacon Hill.

The Danny Woo Gardens includes 101 garden plots tended primarily by elderly, low-income, Asian residents. It provides them with opportunities for exercise, social connection, and to continue their agricultural heritage. The primary languages of the gardeners are Korean and Cantonese and the vegetables grown there reflect the Asian cultures. Most garden plots are used primarily for food production. Fruit trees including cherries, plums, Asian pears, and apples.

== History ==
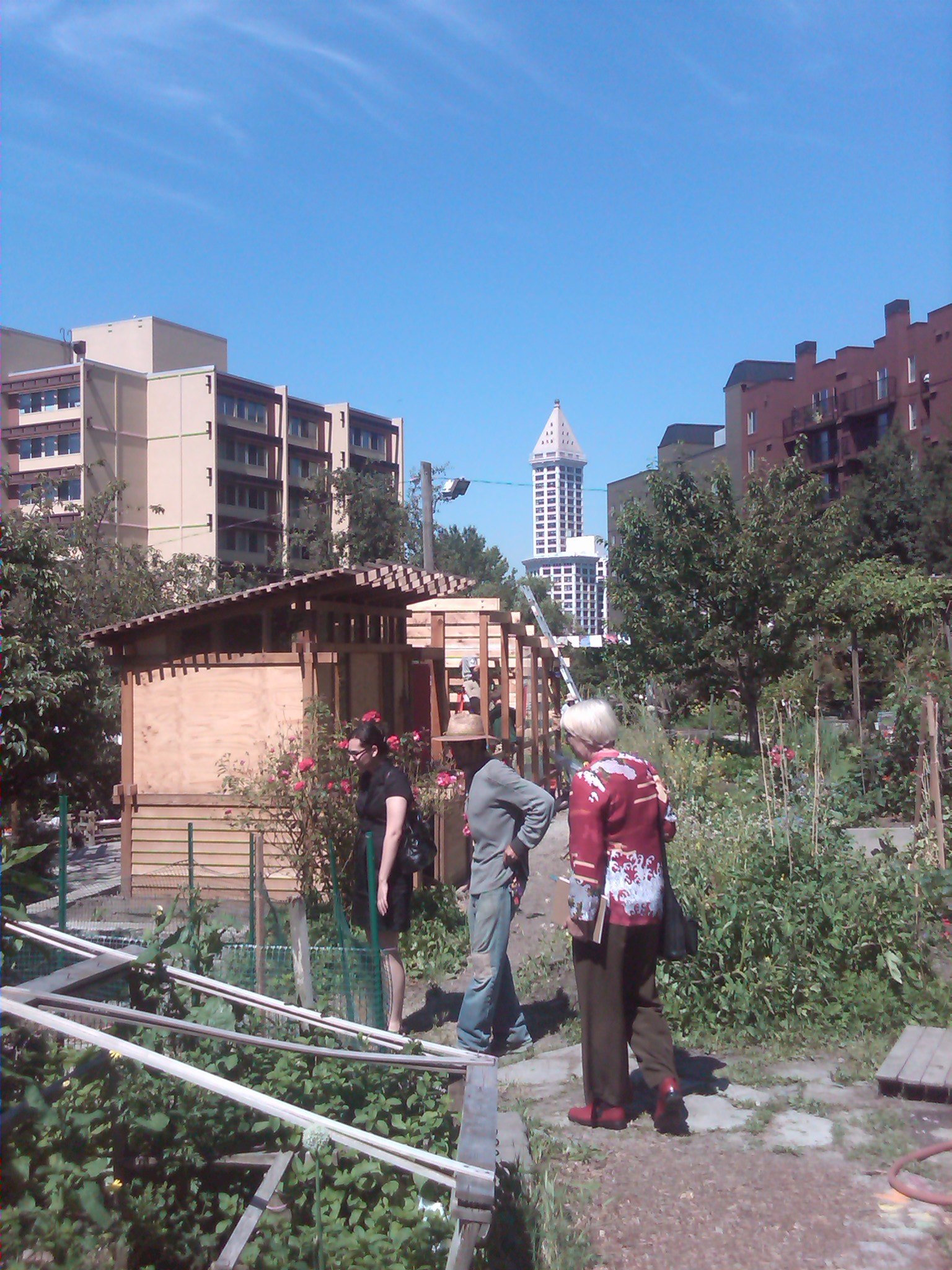
Seattle City Council member Sally Bagshaw visiting the garden

The 1950s through 1970s brought many changes to the Chinatown-International District. The construction of the Interstate 5 freeway in the 1960s physically divided the neighborhood and displaced homes, businesses, and community centers. Stricter building and fire codes in the wake of the 1970 Ozark Hotel fire resulted in the loss of affordable housing and older buildings in the neighborhood. Housing was dilapidated, social services were few, and crime was rampant.

In 1968 a group of business and community leaders from the neighborhood came together to form the International District Improvement Association (Inter*Im), aided by funding from President Johnson's Model Cities Program. In 1971 Bob Santos was brought on as executive director and shortly after, King County Council approved the site of a new stadium on King Street in between Pioneer Square and the International District. There was immediate backlash from International District groups over concerns related to traffic congestion, resident displacement, noise & light pollution, and economic impact on small businesses. Inter*Im was one of many activist and community groups that sprung into action in the early 1970s to pressure local government into providing funds to help mitigate the impacts of the Kingdome's construction and preserve the International District as a multiethnic, pan-Asian neighborhood.

Early InterIm projects between 1970-1975 included acquiring land from WSDOT for a parking lot under I-5, helping to establish the Asian Counseling and Referral Service (ACRS), and lobbying for funding for a community health clinic. In 1975, Diana Bower, the city's Kingdome-International District liaison suggested that Inter*Im build a community garden for elderly residents to grow vegetables. Danny Woo, a landowner and restaurateur, agreed to lease land for a garden to Inter*Im for $1 a year. The conversion of the plot into useable land required a lot of work. Railroad companies were approached for railroad ties to shore up the foundation, and the Longacres Race Track for manure to fertilize the land. Community work parties removed weeds and sticker bushes, and built the garden and terraces, with volunteers that included residents, students, and employees from other social service agencies such as the United Indians of All Tribes and El Centro de la Raza.

In 1980 the City of Seattle leased additional land for expansion of the garden, and in 2014 the sale and transfer of the garden's land to the renamed InterIm Community Development Association (InterIm CDA) was approved by city ordinance, on the condition that they maintain it as a garden in perpetuity.

In recent years, the garden has seen the construction of concrete stairs, a lighting system, a tool shed, and an accessible garden. The accessible garden is at the top of the hill (northernmost part of the garden) and is for seniors who are not able to stoop down or handicapped individuals unable to walk. Additionally, Inter*Im finished the construction of two light posts and several new pathways for the gardeners.

== Demographics ==
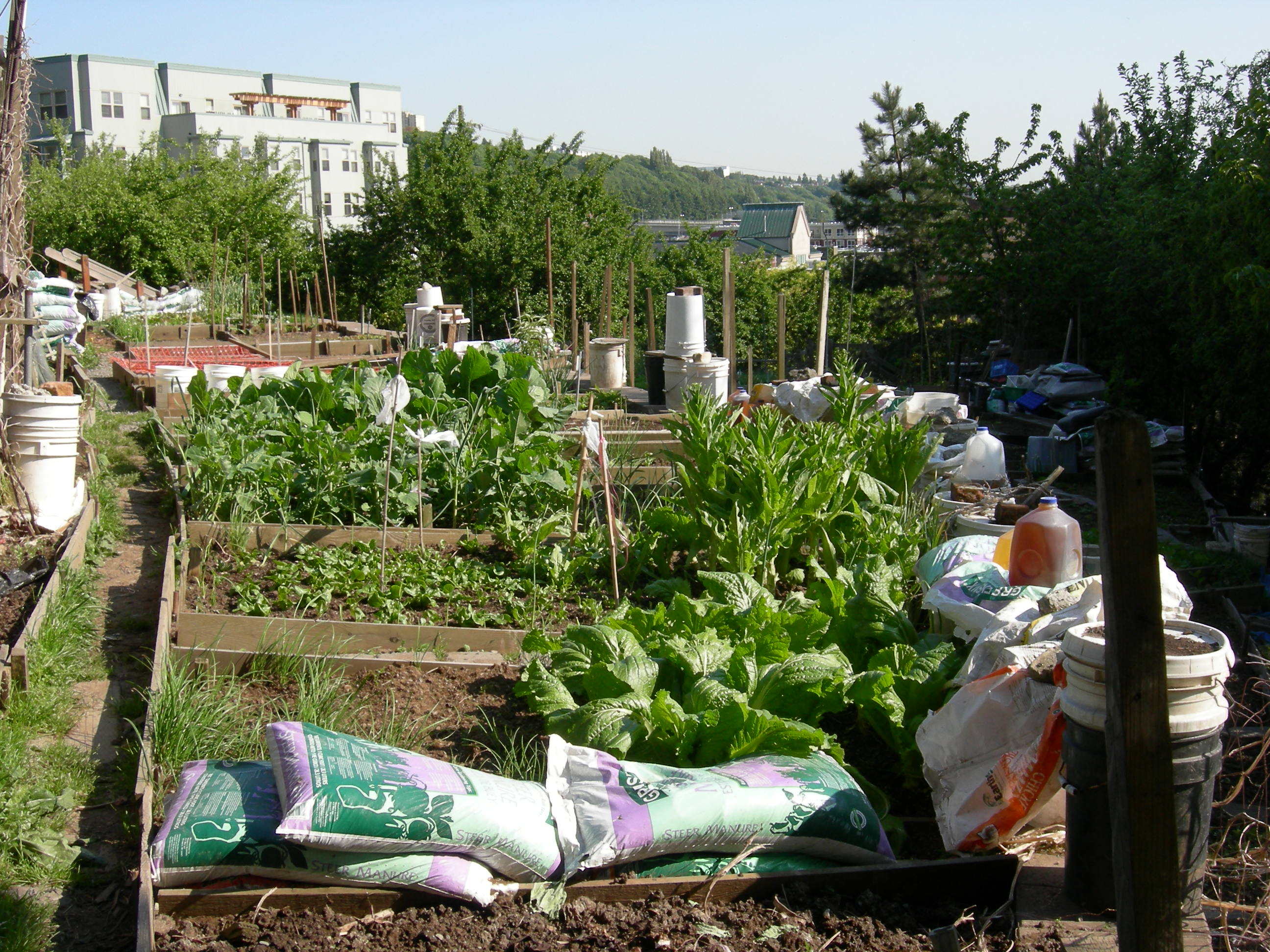
Gardens in 2007

Inter*Im has had a policy of prioritizing the use of the garden. International District (ID) residents who are 55 years or older are given the highest priority, while ID residents who are younger than 55 years are second on the priority list. If there is space, seniors living outside the district are given a plot. Each individual can have up to two plots.

Most of the gardeners have historically been of Asian descent. Currently, many of the gardeners are either Korean or Chinese, however there are gardeners who are of Philippine, Japanese, Vietnamese, and European descent. Many of these Asian gardeners cannot speak English. The garden has seen gardeners working past their 90s in the garden.

The garden is usually a haven for the gardeners, since many of them live in very tight quarters. Some gardeners live in Single Room Occupancy units - rooms that have no bathroom or kitchen—which are converted hotel rooms that used to house the immigrant Asian male community in the 20th century. Additionally, because many of the gardeners have agrarian backgrounds, gardening is a powerful recreational devise and it is also a place for many gardeners to congregate and create friendships.
