= Kim Anh murders =

1995 restaurant robbery and shooting in New Orleans, U.S.

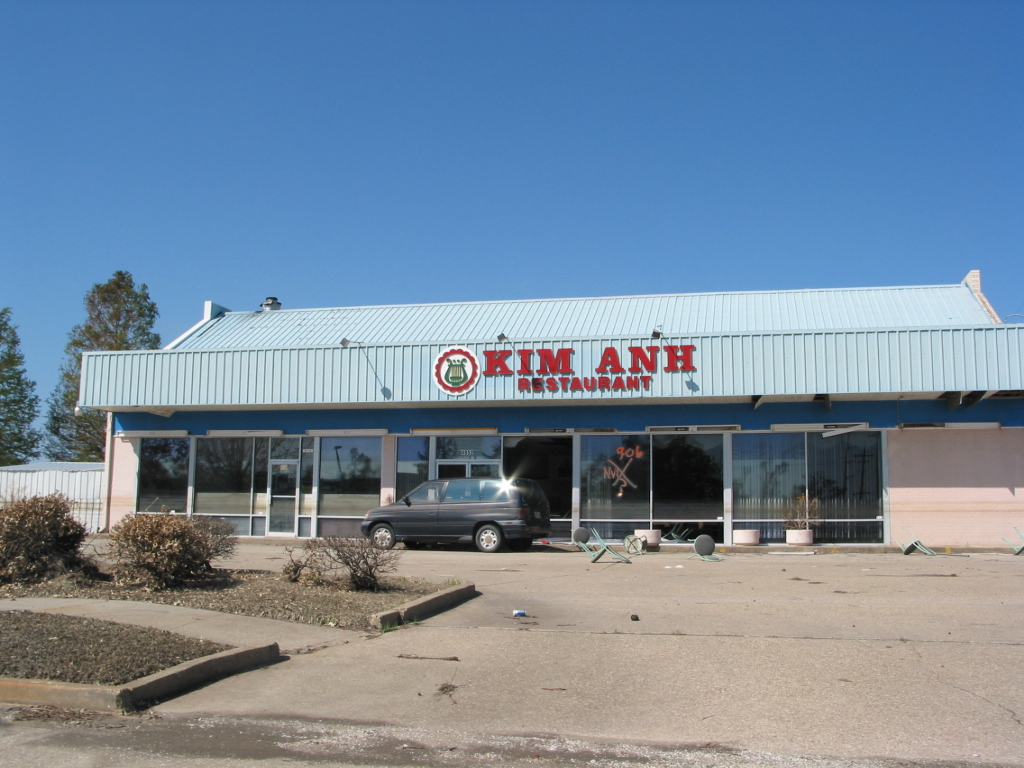
- Kim Anh in September 2005, after Hurricane Katrina
- Location: 30.028233692964392°N 89.94841807563814°W; 4952 Bullard Road; New Orleans, Louisiana, U.S.
- Date: March 3, 1995 – March 4, 1995 c. 11:00 p.m. – c. 1:45 a.m. (CTZ)
- Attack type: Shooting
- Weapon: 9 mm handgun
- Deaths: 3
- Perpetrators: Antoinette Frank; Rogers LaCaze
- Motive: Robbery
- Verdict: Guilty
- Convictions: First degree murder (3 counts)

On the night of March 3–4, 1995, three people were killed during a robbery at the Kim Anh restaurant in New Orleans, Louisiana, United States. The perpetrators, 24-year-old Antoinette Frank and 18-year-old Rogers LaCaze, had fatally shot two kitchen workers and a security guard before fleeing the scene. Frank, a New Orleans Police Department officer, subsequently returned to the scene with first responders and was identified by a surviving witness.

Frank and LaCaze were convicted of three counts of first-degree murder in separate trials that same year and sentenced to death. Frank remained on death row as of May 2025, while LaCaze was re-sentenced to life imprisonment in 2015.

== Background ==
The Kim Anh is a Vietnamese restaurant owned by the Vu family. It was originally founded in New Orleans East by married couple Nguyet Nguyen and Bich Vu. Vu had immigrated from Vietnam to the United States in 1981, with his wife and children following in 1991. By 1995, the four Vu children, sisters Ha (24) and Chau (23) and brothers Quoc (18) and Cuong (17), were working in the restaurant's kitchen. Ha and Cuong, the two later fatalities, were planning to join the Catholic clergy as a nun and priest respectively. Another Vietnamese immigrant, Vui Vu (45; also known by the pseudonym Tu), was employed as a waitress. While the restaurant primarily sold cooked meals, mainly phở, the family also ran a grocery store in an attached part of the building.

The Kim Anh employed two security guards, both off-duty NOPD officers, one being the later perpetrator Antoinette Frank. The other was 25-year-old Ronald Austin "Ronnie" Williams II, who joined the New Orleans Police Department in 1991 and was a married father of two. While on police duty, Frank and Williams were sometimes paired as partners.

== Murders ==
=== Preceding visits ===
On the evening of March 3, 1995, at around 9 p.m., Antoinette Frank phoned the Kim Anh restaurant while working at the 7th District Police Station. Chau Vu answered the call, with Frank asking if she was needed for security that night. Chau informed her that her colleague Ronnie Williams was already with them. Frank's police shift ended at 11 p.m., after which she returned home, changing out of her uniform before picking up Rogers LaCaze and driving to the Kim Anh in Frank's red-white Ford Torino. LaCaze remained in the car while Frank entered the restaurant and ordered cold drinks. During the wait, she started a conversation with co-owner Nguyet Nguyen and Williams, telling them that LaCaze was her nephew and that they were going out for a midnight movie screening. Frank and LaCaze left shortly after receiving the beverages.

While the Kim Anh restaurant was usually open until 1 a.m., Nguyen decided to close down early due to slow business. Nguyen went home, leaving her children and a waitress to clean up. Before leaving, Nguyen had laid out $10,000 on a table in the staff section, meant for plumbing and parking lot expansion costs. Including Williams, six employees were left in the building. At approximately 12:15 a.m., Frank called the restaurant again, this time placing a food order.

Frank and LaCaze returned to the restaurant a few minutes after the call. Frank introduced LaCaze to the kitchen staff, again claiming he was her nephew. The remaining workers brought the food out in to-go styrofoam containers, but Frank and LaCaze elected to eat inside the restaurant. Chau Vu took notice of LaCaze's short stature, golden grills, and cell phone, while Quoc Vu later noted that LaCaze kept staring at him while sweeping the other tables. The two customers exited the restaurant without finishing their meal, with Frank and Chau continuing to talk outside. Frank inquired if she needed to come in for tomorrow's security detail and after consulting with Williams, Chau said it wasn't necessary. After Frank and LaCaze left, Williams told Chau that he did not trust Frank, acknowledging that he allowed Frank to work security with him because other officers weren't available most of the time. Unknown to any of the staff, Frank had stolen a front door key from Quoc at some point during the night.

=== Robbery ===
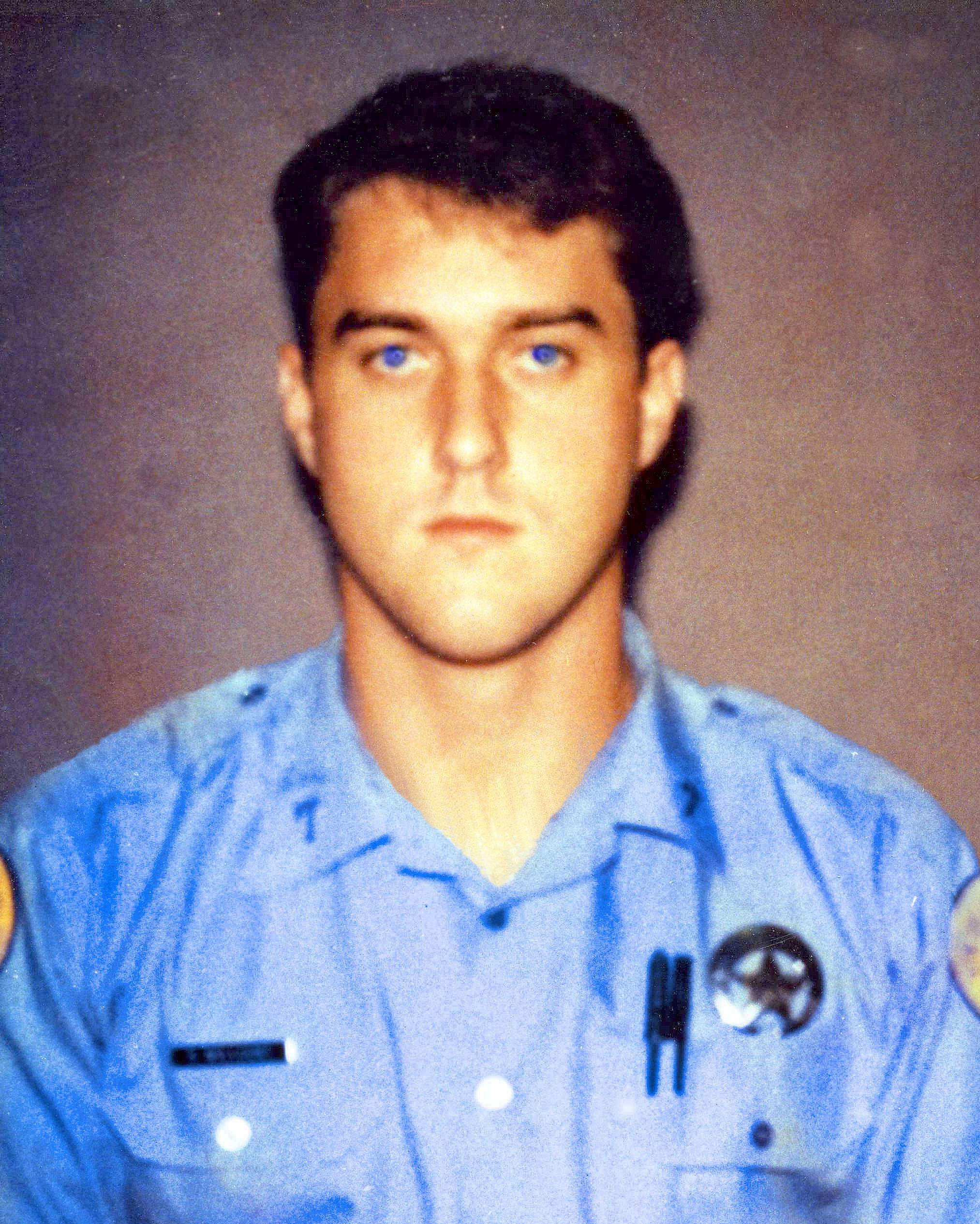
Ronald Austin Williams II

Shortly before 2 a.m., Chau was working in the kitchen when she saw Frank's car pull into the parking lot for the third time. Due to Williams' warning and her suspicions about LaCaze, Chau grabbed the money from the nearby table and hid it in a microwave. At this time, her older sister Ha and younger brother Cuong were cleaning the stoves, while her other brother Quoc swept the floors in the dining area, chatting with Williams who was seated on a bar stool. Chau, Quoc, and Williams saw Frank approach the front entrance and shake the handle. Quoc asked if they should unlock the door, but Chau shouted not to, at which point Frank used the previously stolen key to enter. Williams questioned Frank where she got the key, but she walked past him. Frank pushed Quoc and Chau towards the kitchen, saying she and Chau had to talk. As Williams went to follow after Frank, LaCaze entered the restaurant as well and with Williams' back turned to him, LaCaze shot Williams in the neck, severing his spinal cord and instantly paralyzing him. LaCaze shot Williams two more times as he fell, again in the neck and once in the back. LaCaze then bent down to steal Williams' gun and wallet.

Once Frank pushed Chau and Quoc past the doorframe of the kitchen, she ran back towards LaCaze in the dining area. Chau grabbed her brother and the nearby waitress Vui Vu, leading them into a large walk-in cooler in the kitchen. Both Vu siblings shouted for Ha and Cuong to follow as they ran, but they did not move from their spots. Inside the cooler, Chau shut the door and turned off the lights before crouching down with her brother and the waitress. Chau and Quoc retained a partial view of the dining area and kitchen through a small glass window, witnessing Frank, now carrying LaCaze's gun, pacing around the kitchen with LaCaze, rummaging through a part of the room where the money was usually kept by the Vu family. Frank also walked back to the front of the restaurant and stole the cordless phone at the bar before returning to the kitchen. Chau and Quoc were no longer able to see Frank as she moved out of their line of vision, to the area where Ha and Cuong were last seen.

Ha Vu and Cuong Vu had been forced to kneel as they were questioned by Frank and LaCaze for where the money was kept. Both of the siblings had seen Chau hide the $10,000, but initially kept quiet, remaining in a prayer position. During this time, Frank pistol-whipped Cuong once. After a few minutes, Frank and LaCaze found the money in the microwave. Chau and Quoc heard ten gunshots in close succession and although they did not see who fired them, Frank was determined to have been the shooter at her trial. Cuong was shot six times and struck in the head, chest, stomach, right arm, and right leg. Frank stated that Cuong remained alive after the first few shots and that she fired at him again when he was on the floor in a fetal position. Ha was shot four times, once in the head and three times in the right arm and leg. Afterwards, Frank and LaCaze searched the restaurant for Chau and Quoc, but eventually fled. Aware of the surviving witnesses, Frank dropped LaCaze off at his apartment, she drove back to her precinct to get a police vehicle from the attending staff and return to the scene in uniform, hoping that the remaining staff would reveal themselves upon seeing police and make it easier to kill them.

=== Police response and Frank's arrest ===
The three surviving employees stayed in the cooler and prayed. Chau saw Frank's car drive off, but she also waited for several minutes before crawling out of the cooler. After finding the bodies of Ha and Cuong, Chau looked for Williams in the dining area, discovering him lying in a pool of blood. As Frank had taken the restaurant's phone, Chau grabbed her purse from the bar, containing her mobile phone. As she believed Frank and LaCaze might return, Chau went back to the cooler to make the calls, but the line disconnected both times when she called the emergency line. At 1:48 a.m., was able to call a friend and tell him to call police, stating "The police officer was killed". Meanwhile, Quoc ran out of the restaurant to go to another friend's house and make a second call at 1:50 a.m., telling the emergency operator that a NOPD officer named Antoinette and a man had shot up the restaurant he worked for.

Frank returned to the Kim Anh restaurant, as the first responding officer. Frank parked her car Chau and Vui Vu saw her from inside the cooler, but Chau was suspicious since she could only see one car and a single officer. A second, unmarked police car arrived at 1:52 a.m., containing NOPD officers Wayne Farve and Reginald Jacques. Chau ran out of the building upon seeing the two men emerge, with Frank following after her. At this time, a third police car stopped close to Chau, with the driving officer, Yvonne Farve, running out to intercept Chau. As the other officers were from different precincts, Frank identified herself as a police officer and told them that the perpetrators were at the back of the building. A search found only the bodies of the dead uniformed officer Williams and Chau's two dead siblings. In presence of officer Yvonne Farve, Frank continued to feign unawareness and asked Chau what had happened to which Chau responded "You were there. You know everything. Why you ask me that question?". Chau then told Farve that "Antoinette" and a short black male with gold teeth had committed the murders. As Farve did not know Frank, she asked who "Antoinette" was, with Chau wordlessly pointing at Frank.

Thirty minutes later, homicide detectives Eddie Rantz and Marco Demma arrived to question Frank. She changed her story accordingly, saying that she was present during the shooting as a customer and that she had helped the staff escape through the back door, driving back to the police station alone before returning. Rantz noted that the back door was locked from the inside and after being confronted with this fact, Frank implicated Rogers LaCaze. Although Frank assured the detectives she was unarmed, they found a .38 calibre revolver on her. At the police station, Frank subsequently confessed to her involvement, saying LaCaze had killed Williams and that she killed Ha Vu and Cuong Vu. She claimed that LaCaze had forced her to shoot the two kitchen workers under threat of death, but could not explain her previous inconsistencies or why she did not call for help from her radio, which was found in her private vehicle. Besides Frank's testimony, LaCaze was linked to the murders after the wife of murdered NOPD officer Ronnie Williams reported that her husband's credit card had been used only hours after his death, coinciding with LaCaze purchasing gasoline with the card. Additionally, an alibi provided by LaCaze's brother, claiming the two had played pool together at a billiard hall, was refuted by the hall's owner.

Eddie Rantz, the homicide detective who worked the case, believed Frank and LaCaze planned the robbery to get revenge on Williams. Frank believed Williams was shortchanging her on hours and pay at the Kim Anh, and wanted revenge. Rantz subsequently described Frank as the most cold-hearted person he had ever encountered in three decades as an officer. Chau and Frank were questioned in detail while seated at different tables in the restaurant. Frank was arrested and charged with three counts of first degree murder. LaCaze was arrested and charged later that night. Frank was taken to police headquarters for additional questioning, where she later confessed to the crimes along with LaCaze. She was believed to be the first New Orleans police officer to have been charged with killing a fellow officer.

== Aftermath and later developments ==
=== Officer Ronald Williams ===
Officer Williams was interred in Lake Lawn Metairie Cemetery on March 7, 1995. His name was inscribed on the Memorial Wall at The National Law Enforcement Officers Memorial in Washington D.C.

=== Vu family ===
Initially, the Vu family kept the restaurant open at the site of the tragedy in New Orleans East for a decade, until suffering flood damage from Hurricane Katrina in 2005, and post-storm looters stealing jewelry which Ha and Cuong had been wearing when they were killed. After that, Quoc Vu and his mother Nguyet sold the location, re-opening the restaurant in Harahan, and moving their residence to Metairie, where they said they felt safer.

=== LaCaze appeals for a new trial and subsequent resentencing ===
On July 23, 2015, retired district judge Michael Kirby threw out Rogers LaCaze's conviction and sentence and ordered a new trial. Kirby said that LaCaze deserved a new trial because one of the jurors hid the fact that he was a Louisiana state trooper and previously worked as a railroad policeman. At the time, commissioned law enforcement officers were legally barred from sitting on a jury. Kirby wrote that while he felt the evidence of LaCaze's guilt was "overwhelming", the juror misconduct amounted to a "structural defect" and a "violation of a constitutional right so basic to a fair trial" that the only remedy was a new trial. Kirby's ruling has no effect on Frank's conviction. An appellate court later overturned the new trial order for LaCaze. 4th Circuit appellate judges Edwin Lombard, Paul Bonin and Madeleine Landrieu ruled "After review of the state's writ application in light of the applicable law and arguments of the parties, we find that the trial court erred in finding that the seating of Mr. Settle on the defendant's jury was a structural error entitling him to a new trial."

LaCaze was re-sentenced to life imprisonment without parole on December 13, 2019. LaCaze is serving his sentence at the Louisiana State Penitentiary in West Feliciana Parish.

== See also ==
- Brown's Chicken massacre
- Lane Bryant shooting
- Sittensen murders
- Wah Mee massacre
