= Wah Mee massacre =

1983 mass shooting and robbery in Seattle

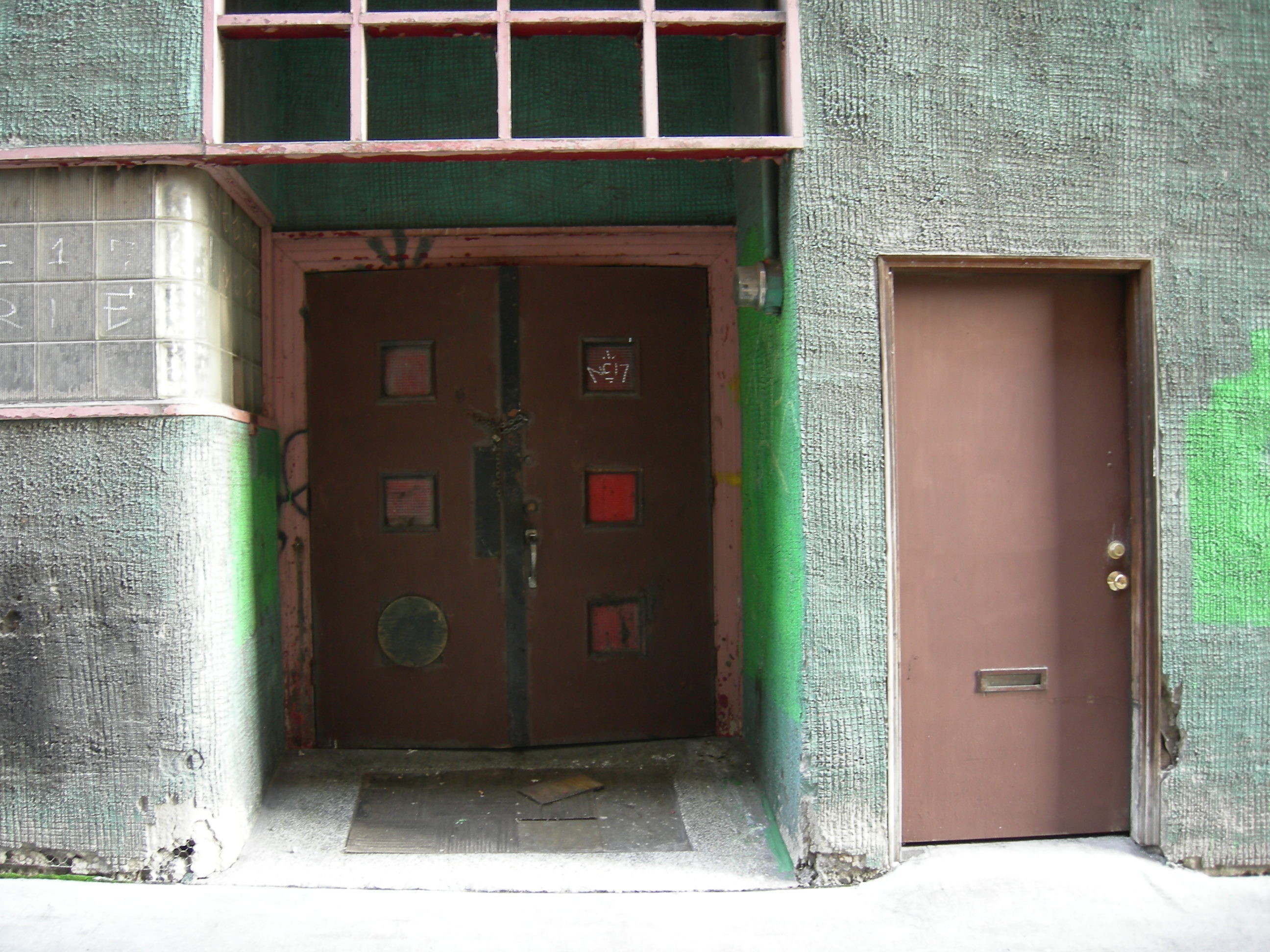
- The shuttered entrance of the Wah Mee Club (double doors at left), December 2007
- Location: 47°35′53″N 122°19′27″W; 665 South King Street Seattle, Washington, U.S.
- Date: February 19, 1983; 43 years ago c. 12:25 a.m. – c. 12:40 a.m. (PST)
- Attack type: Mass shooting; mass murder; armed robbery
- Weapons: Three .22 caliber handguns: Ruger Standard; Colt revolver; Unknown handgun
- Deaths: 13
- Injuries: 1
- Perpetrators: Kwan Fai "Willie" Mak; Keung Kin "Benjamin" Ng; Wai Chiu "Tony" Ng
- Motive: Robbery

Wah Mee massacre
- Traditional Chinese: 華美大屠殺
- Simplified Chinese: 华美大屠杀
Transcriptions
Standard Mandarin
- Hanyu Pinyin: Huáměi dàtúshā
Yue: Cantonese
- Jyutping: waa4 mei5 daai6 tou4 saat3
other Yue
- Taishanese: va3 mei4 ai5 hu2 sat3

The Wah Mee massacre was a mass shooting that occurred during the night of February 18–19, 1983, in the Wah Mee gambling club at the Louisa Hotel in Seattle, Washington, United States. Fourteen people were bound, robbed and shot by three gunmen, 22-year-old Kwan Fai "Willie" Mak, (Note: Mak Kwan Fai: Chinese: 麥群輝; pinyin: Mài Qúnhuī; Jyutping: mak6 kwan4 fai1) 20-year old Keung Kin "Benjamin" Ng (Note: Ng Keung Kin: Chinese: 伍強健; pinyin: Wǔ Qiángjiàn; Jyutping: ng5 koeng4 gin6) and 25-year-old Wai Chiu "Tony" Ng (Note: Ng Wai Chiu: Chinese: 伍偉超; pinyin: Wǔ Wěichāo; Jyutping: ng5 wai5 ciu1) (no relation). Thirteen of the victims died, but 61-year-old Wai Yok Chin, (Note: Chin Yok Wai: Chinese: 陳玉槐; pinyin: Chén Yùhuá; Jyutping: can4 juk6 waai4) a former U.S. Navy sailor and Pai Gow dealer at the Wah Mee, survived to testify against the three in the separate high-profile trials held between 1983 and 1985.

Mak and Benjamin Ng were both given life imprisonment, after Mak's initial death sentence was overturned in 1988, while Tony Ng received a 30-year sentence, serving 28 years before he was released and deported to his native Hong Kong in 2014. It remains the deadliest mass murder in the history of Washington State.

== Background ==
=== Louisa Hotel and Wah Mee Club ===
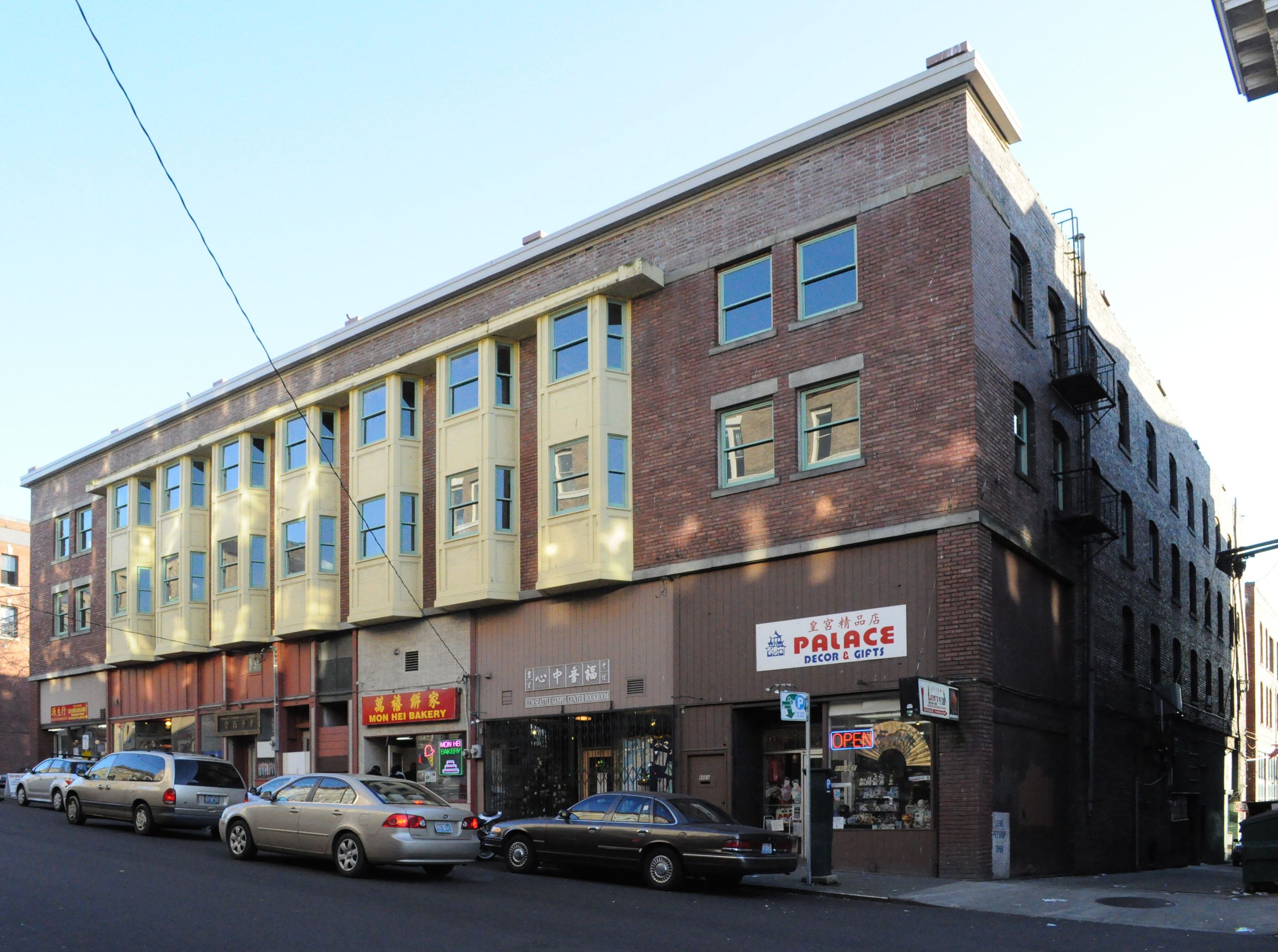
S King St frontage of Louisa Hotel (2009); Maynard Alley is on the right side of the photograph.

The Louisa Hotel was built in 1909. Paul Woo purchased the building in 1963 for US$160,000 (equivalent to $1,680,000 in 2025). Both before and after that purchase, it functioned as a single room occupancy hotel (SRO) with street-level spaces for shops and restaurants until 1970, when tightened building codes led to the closure of the SRO portion.

Two nightclubs operated illegally in the basement space of the hotel by the 1920s. The one in the western half, entered from Maynard Alley South, was originally named Blue Heaven. At its height, patrons of many ethnic backgrounds visited to partake in gambling, dancing and other forms of entertainment. By the 1950s, the club had been renamed to Wah Mee (華美; 'Beautiful China'), known for high-stakes gaming. The Wah Mee operated illegally, as contemporary local blue laws required clubs to close before midnight; it was raided by police in 1972. By the 1980s, the Wah Mee had gained a much seedier reputation as a dive bar.

=== Planning and motive ===
Regulars at the Wah Mee included many wealthy restaurant owners, several of whom were among the victims. Many of the victims were members of the Bing Kung Tong out of San Francisco. According to witnesses for the subsequent prosecution, Willie Mak had been planning the robbery for some time, discussing on multiple occasions his idea to rob a gambling club and kill the witnesses. He eventually enlisted the help of Benjamin Ng; both Ng and Mak were born in Guangdong Province, had previously attended Cleveland High School, were members of the Hop Sing Tong, and worked at the same restaurant in Blaine in 1981. Both were also suspects in prior crimes, including the killing of two elderly Chinese women in Beacon Hill on July 16, 1982. Ng was also known to have shot and injured teenager Michael Chinn in 1981, after the victim had confronted Ng about him slashing the tires of his car.

Tony Ng (no relation to Benjamin Ng), who had also attended Cleveland High School with them, was brought into the group as a "last-minute recruit". According to Tony's testimony at his 1985 trial, he owed Mak $1,000 after gambling with Mak the night before the massacre. Mak offered to forgive the debt if he would participate in a shakedown at the Wah Mee. The day before the robbery, Tony borrowed $1,000 to repay Mak; instead of accepting the money, Mak drew a gun, shot a bullet at Ng's feet, and threatened to kill Ng and his girlfriend, then destroy the Ng family's restaurant, if Ng went to the police.

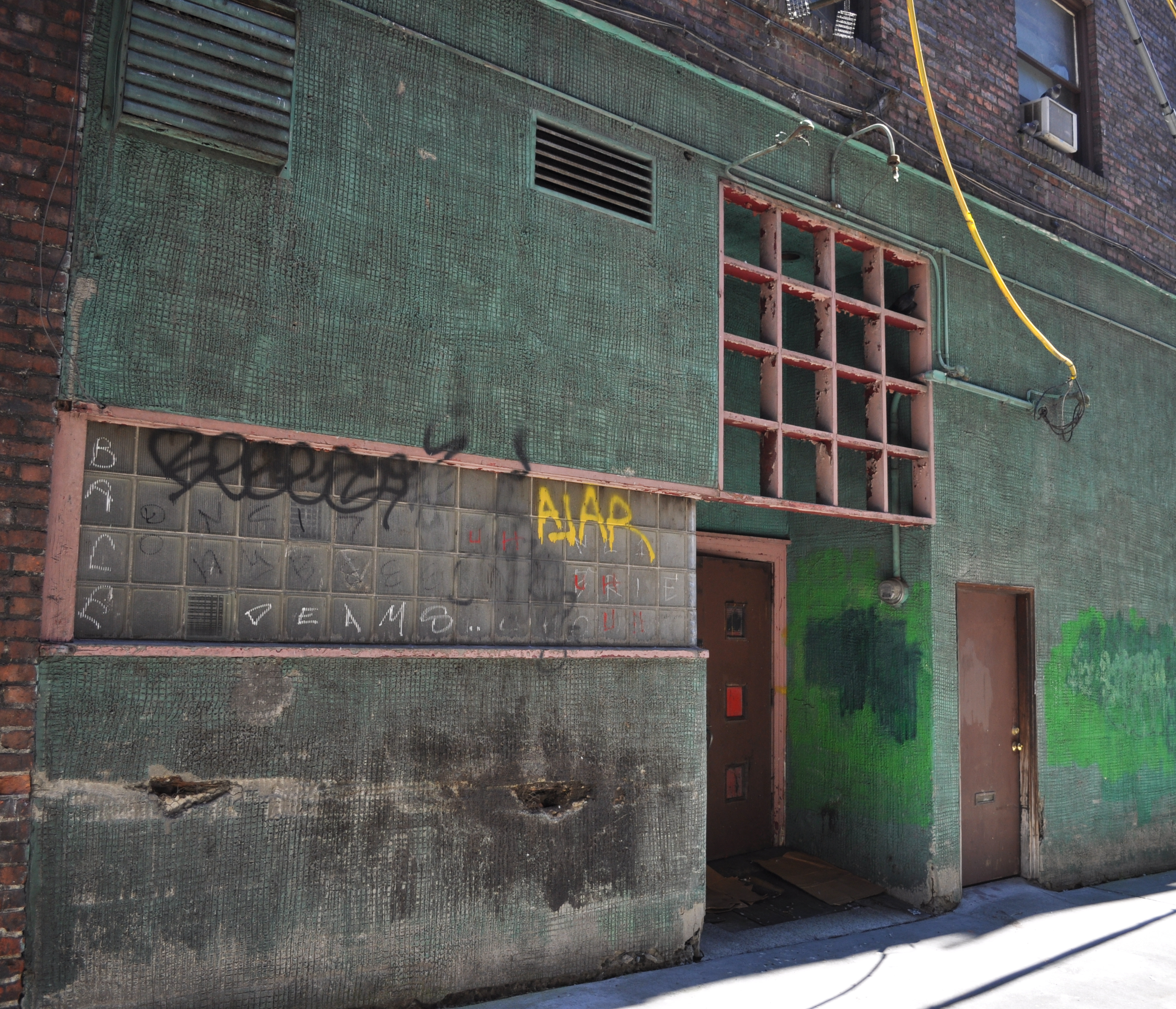
Facade of the Wah Mee Club (2010); the security office was housed behind the rows of glass blocks.

Security at the Wah Mee was based in part on a system of passing through two sets of locked doors, which had been used in similar Chinatown gambling dens for generations and had usually been quite effective. The security office at the front of the club had four rows of opaque glass blocks; one block facing the vestibule was transparent so the security guard on duty could identify patrons and staff. The outer set of doors could only be unlocked from the inside by the guard. Mak and his accomplices defeated the system only because they were known and trusted by the people at the club. During the initial investigation, police stated there were no signs of resistance from the victims; a spokesman said he "believe[d] they recognized [the killers]." Their presumed intent in killing all occupants was to leave no witnesses, since club patrons could have readily identified them — as the one survivor, dealer Wai Yok Chin, did.

== Massacre ==
=== Sequence ===
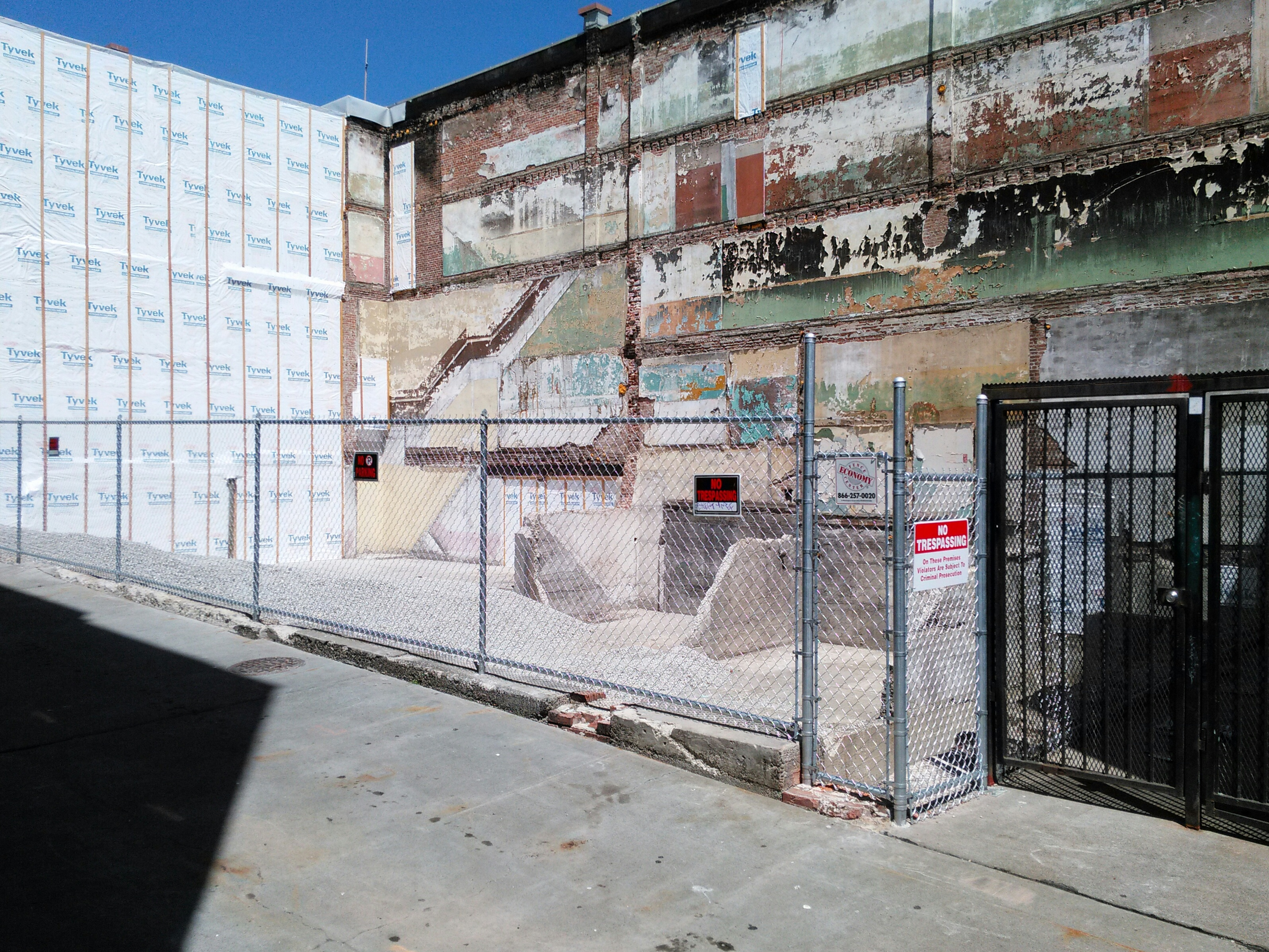
Louisa Hotel Building, Wah Mee club basement exposed on Maynard Alley during renovation (2015). This is a rare view and possibly the last image of the actual crime scene.

On the night of February 18, 1983, Chin arrived at approximately 11:50–11:55 PM for his regular shift as a pai gow dealer, which started at midnight. With Chin, there were five staff members and two patrons inside the Wah Mee. At around midnight, Willie Mak and Tony Ng were allowed entry into the club through a remote buzz-in. For the next thirty minutes, Mak and Tony Ng loitered around the club's upper-level at the bar, the latter ordering tea and chatting with Chin, who shared a few Chinese spare ribs with Tony. Three additional patrons entered during the same timeframe.

Shortly before 12:30 AM, Benjamin Ng entered the club, carrying a paper bag containing pre-cut nylon cords. At this point, all three of the robbers drew their guns, with Benjamin shouting "Hands up!" at those inside the main room, most of whom were gathered around two gaming tables in the lower-level at the club's back. At this time, Mak burst into the security room to the right of the bar, ordering the attending security guard to keep allowing people in on arrival, while Tony checked the back of the club for anyone in the restroom. Once Tony completed the check, the ten people were forced to lay down on their stomachs on the floor of the club's lower level.

Mak remained on the club's upper level with a drawn gun, supervising Benjamin and Tony as they methodically hogtied each victim's hands and feet with rope in the gaming area. Chin convinced Tony, who was tying his bonds, to loosen the rope, as there was "no need to tie so tight, I'm an old man". Benjamin and Tony then proceeded to rob the victims. They stole several wallets, a purse and the money inside a cash register. The valuables were collected in a bag, with wallets being thrown in, while others were emptied and discarded on the floor. During this process, four more patrons arrived and were let inside; they too were tied-up, forced to the floor, and robbed. In the end, the loot amounted to approximately $20,000.

After all money had been stolen from the victims, Mak instructed Tony to take the bag and wait near the main entrance; he fled across the alley to the Hop Sing Club to wait for Mak and Benjamin. Tony testified at trial that although he had a gun, he never used it and was forced to participate in the robbery under duress. At this point, Mak and Benjamin Ng, standing on the steps connecting the club's two levels, opened fire on the victims. Because he had more freedom of movement, Chin was able to move himself under a table, partially shielding him from gunfire, before being hit in the neck and jaw by the initial volley, falling unconscious as a result. Either Mak and Benjamin also returned to the office and killed the cornered security guard. Both gunmen then paced around the victims, firing and reloading several times, not stopping until they had run out of ammo completely. Afterwards Mak and Benjamin exited through the main entrance, met up with Tony and together, the trio fled down Maynard Alley.

Shortly after the robbers escaped, a man arrived to enter the Wah Mee after his work shift ended, but he received no response after using the doorbell and did not see the doorman through the small window into the security office. He was joined by a second customer, who was also confused about the locked entrance, with both men repeatedly ringing the doorbell and banging on the door. The noise caused Chin to slowly regain consciousness. Chin was able to loosen his restraints, crawl up the steps to the ground level, and eventually stand up to stagger through the two entrance doors, collapsing in front of the two patrons. Seeing the bullet wounds on Chin, one man asked who had done this to him, to which Chin responded "[Benjamin] Ng and Mak. That's all I can tell. The door locked already. Call ambulance". One man helped carry Chin away from the club, being spotted by two police officers on South King Road, who called the situation in at 12:44 AM.

Chin was rushed to Harborview Medical Center and questioned along the way in the ambulance, again confirming he knew two of the perpetrators. Meanwhile, police used a prybar from a fire department vehicle to force open the entrance doors. At around 1:30 AM, four officers entered the Wah Mee and found twelve dead; one more victim, Wah Mee manager John Loui, subsequently died of his injuries at the hospital, and Chin was the sole survivor. The news about the shooting spread quickly and over sixty people had gathered outside the cordoned-off police operation at the time of entry.

According to the police, thirty-two shots were fired in total; twenty-six of those were fired from the same .22 caliber gun. Each victim had been shot in the head at least once.

== Victims ==
All 13 victims, twelve men and one woman, were of Cantonese-speaking Chinese origin, most from Hong Kong or Taishan. (Note: With the exception of Henning Chinn, who was born to a Chinese family in Seattle, and Chin Lee Law, who was a Chinese Indonesian who lived in Mainland China and Hong Kong since childhood, the victims were all born in China.) Four of the dead, 48-year-old John S. Loui, (Note: John Loui: Chinese: 梅啟權; pinyin: Méi Qǐquán; Jyutping: mui4 kai2 kyun4) (Note: Similar to other victims who were only listed by their English first names, most sources provide only phonetic spellings of Loui's name, although the majority use the surname 雷 (léi in pinyin or lui3 in Taishanese) or 吕 (lǚ in pinyin or lui4 in Taishanese)) 54-year-old Hung Fat Gee, (Note: Gee Hung Fat: Chinese: 朱鴻發; pinyin: Zhū Hóngfā; Jyutping: zyu1 hung4 faat3) 52-year-old Henning G. Chinn, (Note: Henning Gin Chinn: Chinese: 陳健; pinyin: Chén Jiàn; Jyutping: can4 gin6) and 54-year-old Gim Lun Wong, (Note: Wong Gim Lun: Chinese: 黄锦伦; pinyin: Huáng Jǐnlún; Jyutping: wong4 gam2 leon4) were employees at the Wah Mee (manager, cook/waiter and doormen respectively). The remaining nine were patrons, identified as 52-year-old restaurateur Moo Min Mar, (Note: Mar Moo Min: Chinese: 馬禮佐; pinyin: Mǎ Lǐzuǒ; Jyutping: maa5 lai5 zo3) 47-year-old Jean Bick Chinn, (Note: Chinn Bick Jean; also Jean C. Mar: Chinese: 陳碧珍; pinyin: Chén Bìzhēn; Jyutping: can4 bik1 zan1) 60-year-old retired postal worker Jack Mar, (Note: Jack Mar: Chinese: 馬發; pinyin: Mǎ Fā; Jyutping: maa5 faat3) 68-year-old Kokusai Theater projectionist Dewey Mar, 59-year-old line cook and former U.S. Army sergeant Wing Wong, (Note: Wong Wing: Chinese: 王穎; pinyin: Wáng Yǐng; Jyutping: wong4 wing6) (Note: Also given the alternate name Biou Lew (Chinese: 劉標; pinyin: Liú Biāo; jyutping: lau4 biu1). Lew is the surname his son uses, but his paternal extended family is named Wong.) 60-year-old fisherman and cook Lung Wing Chin, (Note: Chin Lung Wing: Chinese: 陳家源; pinyin: Chén Jiāyuán; Jyutping: can4 gaa1 jyun4) 51-year-old car repair shop owner and part-time employee Chin Lee Law, (Note: Law Chin Lee: Chinese: 羅俊利; pinyin: Luó Jùnlì; Jyutping: lo4 zeon3 lei6; Pe̍h-ōe-jī: Lô Tsùn-lāi) 47-year-old chef George Mar, (Note: George Mar: Chinese: 馬啟予; pinyin: Mǎ Qǐyǔ; Jyutping: maa5 kai2 jyu5) and 55-year-old cook and legionnaire of Cathay Post 186 Chong L. Chin. (Note: Chin Chong Len: Chinese: 陳昌連; pinyin: Chén Chānglián; Jyutping: can4 coeng1 lin4) Besides Moo Min Mar and Jean Chinn, who were husband and wife, none of the victims were related. With the exception of Henning Chinn, all victims were members of the Bing Kung Tong.

== Arrests ==
Chin was able to identify both Mak and Benjamin for the police; the identity of the third gunman was unknown to him.

In the early morning of February 19, the Seattle police went to the home of Benjamin's brother, Stephen, who told them that Benjamin lived with his girlfriend in her parents' home. The police arrested Benjamin at the girlfriend's residence, where he had been sleeping. After obtaining a search warrant, the police returned later that afternoon to find $7,500 in cash, two loaded .38 caliber revolvers, an M-1 rifle and ammunition in the bedroom.

Mak called and turned himself in to police hours later. Shortly after his arrest, he confessed that he had "shot them all", a statement he later repudiated. Police recovered more guns and cash from Mak's home on February 19, but none of the guns matched those used in the murders. An unidentified third man, who accompanied Mak to the surrender, was questioned and released. Two men, including Mak's older brother, were accused of destroying evidence of the crime; Mak had borrowed a car from one of the men the night of the massacre.

Police identified Tony Ng as the third suspect and issued a federal warrant for his arrest on March 31, 1983. After speaking with his mother the morning after the massacre, Tony fled to Canada upon learning that thirteen people had been killed. The Bing Kong Tong offered a US$60,000 (equivalent to $194,000 in 2025) reward for information leading to his arrest and conviction. On June 15, 1984, Tony became the 387th person to be listed on the FBI's Ten Most Wanted Fugitives list. After twenty months in hiding, he was arrested October 4, 1984, in Calgary, Alberta, by the Royal Canadian Mounted Police, acting on a tip made to Seattle police. At the time, Tony was working as an electronics assembly technician under the alias Jim Wong, living with a roommate who was unaware of his fugitive status; police suspected he had been partially supported by his family. His extradition to the U.S. was blocked by his Canadian lawyer until American authorities dropped the charges that could have resulted in the death penalty.

== Trials and sentencing ==
On February 24, 1983, Mak and Benjamin were charged with thirteen counts of aggravated first-degree murder and one count of first degree assault. Benjamin was represented by Seattle defense lawyer John Henry Browne. Mak was represented by the associated counsel for the accused, lawyers Jim Robinson and Don Madsen. The State was represented by William Downing and Robert Lasnik. On March 22, Judge Frank D. Howard set a preliminary trial date for both Benjamin and Mak for April 20, but they were tried separately because the defense believed Mak would blame Ng. Tony was named the third suspect, charged in absentia on March 30, 1983, with thirteen counts of aggravated first-degree murder.

=== Benjamin Ng ===
On August 25, 1983, Benjamin was convicted on the thirteen counts of aggravated first-degree murder after two to three hours of deliberation and was sentenced to life in prison without the possibility of parole on the next day. During the sentencing phase, Benjamin's mother testified on his behalf, stating the family had emigrated from Hong Kong in 1975; while still in Hong Kong, Benjamin had been beaten on the head repeatedly with a piece of wood, resulting in brain damage, as corroborated by medical experts.

Jury selection for the trial began on August 9. Initially, Ng's defense claimed he did not shoot anyone, as the weapons found in the bedroom of his girlfriend were a different caliber, but the prosecution asserted that .22 caliber shell casings recovered at the Wah Mee scene matched a gun that Ng once fired. During the trial, Ng's attorney conceded that he had participated in the robbery and was guilty of first-degree murder, but not aggravated first-degree murder; the distinction, had he been convicted of first-degree murder without aggravation, would have made him ineligible for the death penalty and would have raised the possibility of parole. The defense had contended that although Benjamin Ng had participated in planning the robbery, he did not plan to murder the victims to silence potential witnesses. The jury concluded that Ng had killed in furtherance of the robbery, justifying the aggravated murder enhancement.

Ng was sentenced to a 15th life sentence in December 1983, after testimony accusing him of the unrelated murder of Franklin E. Leach near Lake Washington on October 22, 1981, was introduced during Mak's trial.

=== Willie Mak ===
On October 6, 1983, Willie Mak was convicted of 13 counts of aggravated first degree murder and one count of first-degree assault and sentenced to death by hanging on October 22. On April 24, 1986, the Washington State Supreme Court upheld the verdict and death sentence.

Jury selection for the trial began on September 12. The defense were expected to blame an unnamed individual who wished to gain control over illegal gambling operations in Chinatown. At his trial, Mak claimed that he had only gone to the Wah Mee to rough up a patron as retaliation for the beating of a senior Hop Sing Tong official. Mak, a member of the Hop Sing along with Benjamin Ng, claimed he was directed to do so by Roy Chu, president of the Hop Sing, an allegation which Chu denied. According to Mak's testimony, Benjamin Ng and his companion were independently robbing the patrons and Mak left before any shooting occurred, but he heard "snapping sounds" as he left. In addition, Mak's lawyer argued that Benjamin Ng was the shooter at the Wah Mee by blaming Ng for the unsolved murder of Franklin Leach, aged 71, in 1981. According to Jim Robinson, Leach was shot when he jogged by Mak and Ng as they were dumping a stolen safe into Lake Washington. During the trial, prosecutors and police used hypnosis to change the testimony of a defense witness.

On February 17, 1987, the Washington State Supreme Court issued a stay of execution a month before Willie Mak's scheduled execution, but on May 2, 1988, the State Supreme Court let Mak's murder conviction stand. However, on November 10, 1988, Willie Mak's execution was delayed indefinitely by a federal judge. On January 8, 1991 U.S. District Judge William Dwyer overturned Willie Mak's death sentence, saying Mak's attorneys failed to present evidence on their client's background that could have saved his life. On July 16, 1992, the 9th U.S. Circuit Court of Appeals refused to reinstate Mak's death sentence.

On November 9, 1994, a King County Superior Court judge denied Mak's bid for a new trial but allowed prosecutors to hold a new sentencing hearing. On February 15, 2002, a King County Superior Court judge scheduled a sentencing hearing for September 2002. On April 29, 2002, a King County Superior Court judge ruled that Mak will not face execution since the 1983 jury wasn't asked to determine how much of a role he had in the crime. Mak was resentenced to life without parole.

=== Tony Ng ===
Tony Ng was acquitted on April 19, 1985, of murder, but convicted of 13 counts of first-degree robbery and a single count of assault with a deadly weapon. Each robbery charge brought a minimum sentence of five years, some to be served consecutively. On July 3, 1985, Tony Ng was sentenced to 13 life terms, one for each count of first-degree robbery, which would mean a term of 35 years in total.

The jury selection for Tony Ng's trial was completed on April 4 after four days of proceedings. Tony Ng was represented at his trial by Mark Mestel and John Muenster. Defense attorneys questioned whether the 45-minute statement Ng gave to the RCMP upon his arrest in Calgary was admissible, as he had not been advised of his rights. Prior to the trial, prosecutors stated they would not seek the death penalty, as the earlier trials of Benjamin Ng and Mak showed that Tony Ng did not play a part in the planning of the crime. At his trial, the defense argued that Ng "had no reason in the world to [participate in the robbery]" and drew a contrast between the "homicidal maniacs" Mak and Benjamin Ng and his client, characterized as quiet, shy, and passive. The prosecution countered by asking why Mak and Benjamin Ng would "drag an unwilling witness into a crime that had as a central facet the elimination of all witnesses".

In 1997, federal magistrate John Weinberg concluded that Ng did not receive a fair trial in 1985 and recommended either his release or a new trial. No action was required unless a U.S. District Court judge acted on his recommendation.

I want the victims [of the Wah Mee Massacre] to forgive me for my participation on that night. It was a mistake, and I want to say I’m sorry. [...] I shouldn’t have hung around [Mak and Benjamin Ng] but I did. I wasn’t street-wise and didn’t know how to say no. I want the Asian community to forgive the fact that I caused pain.

— Tony Ng, Northwest Asian Weekly, December 2009

On September 6, 2006, a parole board met to determine whether Tony Ng should receive parole on his 12th robbery term. If given parole, he would begin serving his 13th term, with the potential to be eligible for parole and freed in 2010. Both former King County Prosecuting Attorney Norm Maleng and former Seattle Police Chief Patrick Fitzsimons asked the parole board to deny parole on the 12th count. Relatives of the victims who came to the hearing expressed outrage that they were not made aware of previous parole hearings and that Tony Ng was so close to possible release because of it. Ng was denied parole in 2007, which meant he could not begin serving time on the final count.

In December 2009, the parole of Tony Ng again came before the state parole board; relatives of the victims again spoke before the board, urging against his release. In February 2010, a parole board unanimously decided "now is the time to parole Mr. [Tony] Ng to his final count." On October 24, 2013, Tony Ng was granted parole. Although the relatives of the victims continued to oppose the parole, he was released on October 25, 2013, from state prison directly to the Northwest detention center in Tacoma, into the custody of the U.S. Immigration and Customs Enforcement for deportation proceedings. He was deported to Hong Kong on May 13, 2014.

== Aftermath ==
The buses come every day. Every day. It's not that I don't want it remembered so that it will never happen again. I just don't want it exploited like that. When there's a terrible murder somewhere else, you don't see a busload of Asians come out to look.

— Donnie Chin, proprietor of the Sun May souvenir shop, quoted in 2008 Post-Intelligencer article

Following the shooting, the doors to the Wah Mee were padlocked shut, and the contents were not disturbed after the police left. The club was never reopened, although the site was a popular stop for tour buses.

A spokesman for the Hop Sing Tong denied the massacre was an act of war against the Bing Kung Tong; Mak and Benjamin Ng were both members of the Hop Sing, and most of the victims were members of the Bing Kung.

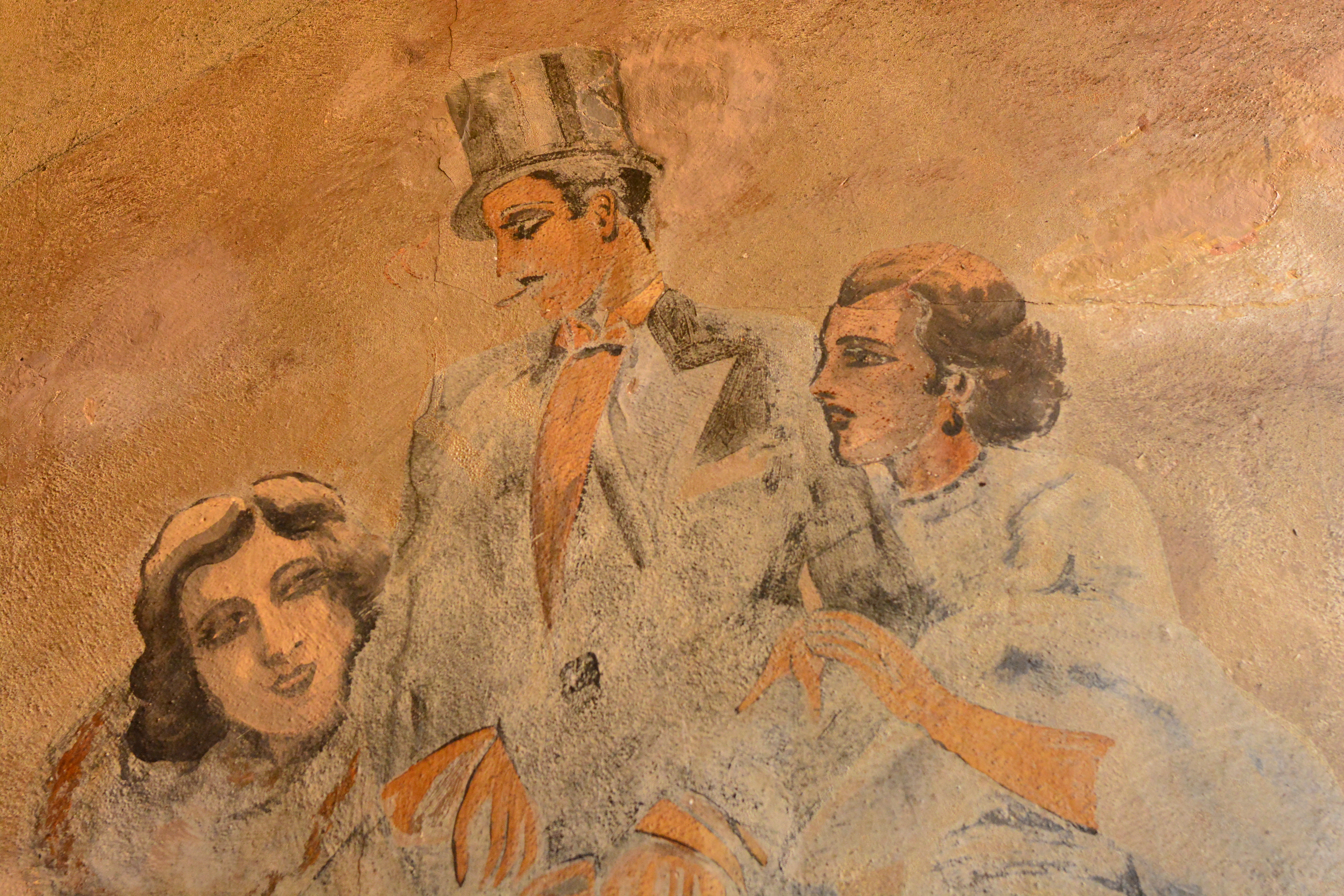
Part of a mural discovered in the Club Royale space while the building was being restored in the 2010s

Chin, the sole survivor of the massacre, made a full recovery despite an early medical setback and possible assassination threats that forced prosecutors to depose him on videotape prior to the trials. Because the then-unknown perpetrator was still at large, Chin and his girlfriend remained under police protection for several months, which were spent mostly playing cards with the officers and travelling around Washington state. He died in May 1993, aged 71.

Following the Wah Mee massacre, many Chinese clubs in Seattle ended gambling to avoid becoming a potential robbery target. In July 1987, a series of anonymous phone tip-offs, motivated by fear of attracting robbers to community centers, exposed an illegal gambling operation at a Chinese social club and by 1992, eight Seattle-area Chinese gambling clubs were raided, with 38 people arrested.

The Louisa Hotel continued to host street-level businesses until a fire on Christmas Eve 2013 destroyed the top floor and interior of the building. The Woo family, who still owned the building, decided to demolish the fire-damaged portion (which included all of the former Wah Mee space) while retaining as much of the building as possible to preserve its contribution to the Chinatown Historic District. Demolition work was completed in April 2015. Reconstruction began February 12, 2018, with a blessing by Buddhist monks and a procession. The building reopened June 2019, with eighty-five rental apartments plus street-level retail and restaurant space.

Media heavily reported on the shooting. Speculation that the massacre was the result of a triad gang rivalry persisted for years and characterized the Chinatown-International District as a parallel society. In the decades after the shooting, true crime tourists often came to view the crime scene at the Louis Hotel in what was later described as a form of "voyeurism". The coverage was later described as enforcing racial stereotypes about Seattle's Chinese community and Asian-Americans in general.

== See also ==
- Golden Dragon massacre
- Brown's Chicken massacre
- Lane Bryant shooting
- Sittensen murders
- List of massacres in the United States
- History of Chinese Americans in Seattle
