= Sittensen murders =

2007 mass murder and robbery in Sittensen, Germany

- Location: 53.28°N 9.50°E; Hamburger Straße 6 Sittensen, Lower Saxony, Germany
- Date: 4 February 2007 – 5 February 2007; 23:03 – 0:09 (CET)
- Target: Lin Yue workers
- Attack type: Shooting, mass murder
- Weapon: .22 Remington FÉG Luger pistol
- Deaths: 7
- Perpetrators: Trong Duong Dao; Phong Cao Dao; Van Hiep Vu; Van Phuong Vu; Quoc Thanh Nguyen
- Motive: Witness elimination
- Verdict: Life imprisonment (Dao brothers); 14 years imprisonment (Van Hiep Vu); 4 years and 9 months imprisonment (Van Phuong Vu); 5 years imprisonment (Nguyen)
- Convictions: Murder x7 Aggravated robbery

On the night of 4–5 February 2007, seven people were shot and killed during a robbery at the Lin Yue restaurant in Sittensen, Lower Saxony, Germany. A two-year-old girl, the daughter of the two murdered owners, was left alive. Five Vietnamese immigrants were arrested and sentenced for the murders.

The killings are considered one of the worst mass murders in post-war German history and have been dubbed the "seven-fold murders of Sittensen" and "Sittensen massacre". The investigation was marred by sensationalist reporting focusing on speculative involvement of Asian crime syndicates, which persisted well until the trial of the perpetrators.

== Background ==
The Lin Yue Restaurant (Chinese: 年余酒樓) was a Chinese restaurant located on Hamburger Straße in the centre of Sittensen, 20 kilometres (12 mi) from Rotenburg an der Wümme, being situated about halfway between Bremen and Hamburg. The town, connected directly to the A1 motorway, had around 5,500 residents at the time of the crime.

The Lin Yue was run by married couple Danny and Anny Fan, who both had Hong Kong Chinese backgrounds. Their daughter was born in 2004. The Fan family was described as well-off and popular in town. Later reports claim that Danny Fan intended to sell his restaurant for €200,000, with his wife Anny planning to work as a shoe saleswoman.

The restaurant name means "Year's Surplus", also translated to "one who had a lot of money left at year's end". It opened in December 1997 and was situated in a three-story mixed-use development. The restaurant, consisting of the dining area, kitchen, pantry, and employee room, was situated on the first floor. The top floor housed apartment spaces, with one being rented as an office for the Lin Yue. A driving school was operated out of the ground floor.

== Murders ==
The Lin Yue served its last customers for the day, a local couple, at around 22:30.

At 23:03, three men entered the establishment and overpowered the staff, forcing them to the ground at gunpoint and tying them up with cable ties by the thumbs and big toes, further tying some of the hostages to chairs. The robbers, two of whom were under the influence of cocaine, had failed to notice the head chef hiding in the kitchen as they only expected five employees. After stealing the mobile phones and wallets of the victims, Anny Fan was forced to open the safe with the restaurant's earnings and salaries upstairs.

Shortly after she was returned, Danny Fan, who was being physically restrained after resisting attempts to be tied up, lunged at one of the remaining two robbers. One of the robbers beat him with a wooden board, after which Danny Fan was shot twice in the head while on the ground. The action caused the make-shift face covering of the shooter to slip. Immediately after, the hidden chef attempted to flee to the hallway, being shot five times in the back and then once in the back of the head while on the ground by the same gunman. Then, Anny Fan, her daughter, and the four other staff, two waitresses and two kitchen helpers, were blindfolded and forced to the ground in the dining area. The adults were shot in the back of the head with a suppressed small-caliber handgun. Anny Fan was also choked before being killed. Before being shot, fabric such as table cloths and a shirt were put over the victims' faces to lessen the splatter of blood and afterwards pink napkins from the tables were used to hem the flow of blood. A total of 14 shots had been fired. The five bodies were moved, two behind the counter, one in a pantry and two into different rooms on the upper floor, while those of the two previously killed men remained in the main dining area.

The child was covered with a blanket before the shootings and left cradled in the arms of one of the waitresses. One of the robbers later stated that the child was spared because it was assumed she would be unable to recognize the perpetrators due to her young age. Also spared was a Pekingese pet dog. The robbers took €5,105, two computers, and 13 mobile phones, also searching through several rooms after the shooting, before driving to their residences in Bremen, spending the next hours at a casino. The scene was found at 0:20 when the 47-year-old husband of a waitress came to fetch his wife. He called police at 0:29, with officers arriving five minutes later. Six of the victims died at the scene while a seventh died in a hospital the following morning.

== Victims ==
Four men and three women were killed, including the proprietors, Wing Hung "Danny" Fan (Chinese: 范永雄), designated Body 2, and Siu Wai "Anny" Fan (née Zhang; 张小蕙), designated Body 5. They were British citizens, who previously lived in Glasgow, Scotland. Danny Fan was born in Hong Kong and raised in Glasgow's Hillhead and Garnethill areas. Anny Fan was born in Berlin to Hong Kong immigrants. The pair married in Scotland and had been living in Germany since 1992. Their ages are contradictorily given as either 36 and 32, 36 and 28, or 32 and 28 respectively.

They employed five staff members, three of whom lived in the same building as the Lin Yue, while two commuted from nearby cities:

- 57-year-old cook Wan Wong Li, cook since 2001. He was the maternal uncle of Danny Fan who immigrated from Hong Kong, where he used to work as a civil servant. Like his nephew and his wife, he was also a British citizen, but otherwise kept a low profile. Like the Fans and Foong, Li was known as a gambling addict. Designated Body 1.
- 36-year-old Wai Heng Foong, waitress. She illegally immigrated to Germany with her husband Kee Fatt Tham for financial reasons, leaving their two children in Malaysia with relatives. Foong's monthly income was unusually high for her work at €1000 and she was known to spend several thousand euros at casinos as well as jeweler shops. The couple lived in Soltau and shortly before being taken hostage, Foong was able to call her husband, who did not pick up due to taking a shower and a relative in Malaysia. Designated Body 3.
- 38-year-old Thi Kim Oanh Nguyen Janßen, waitress since 2004. Originally from Vietnam, she was a trained weaver who had previously lived in Russia, from where she was illegally smuggled into Germany through a human trafficking ring. On 30 January 2001, she crossed the Czech–German border on foot and applied for asylum, but only received toleration status. To prevent her deportation, she paid €10,000 for a sham marriage with a German citizen, living separate from her husband in Sittensen. Nguyen was on a call with a friend, which inadvertently recorded the moment the robbers entered. Designated Body 4.
- 31-year-old Rojasit Jitloed, assistant cook. Born in Thailand, he immigrated to Germany at age six with his mother and adoptive father, who was a German national. He received German citizenship, graduated Hauptschule, served mandatory military duty in the Bundeswehr and was a trained painter. He lived in Wolfenbüttel at the time of his murder. Designated Body 6.
- 32-year-old Ngoc Son Dao, assistant cook. Known mostly by the nickname Sonny, he used several false identities to avoid a deportation order. For this reason, Dao's background is entirely unknown, though friends confirmed that he was of Vietnamese origin. He was initially recovered alive from the pantry, but died of his injuries the same day.

Only the Fans, Jitloed, and Foong were immediately identified, as the rest did not carry documentation on them. All victims were named by 9 February. There was initially uncertainty in Chinese newspapers whether the victims were ethnically Chinese, due to many Chinese restaurants in Europe being run by Southeast Asians instead. Besides the Hong Kong-origin owners and head cook, the two waitresses were part of Chinese diaspora, being Malaysian Chinese and Hoa, the latter confirmed by a cousin. The Chinese Consulate General in Hamburg confirmed, contrary to initial assumptions, that none of the dead were Chinese citizens.

== Investigation ==
Lower Saxony State Police headed the investigation, forming an 80-person special taskforce, Sonderkommission (Soko) "Lin Yue", headed by Rotenburg Kripo chief Petra Guderian. The taskforce was expanded to over 100 officers by 16 February. Additionally, the Federal Criminal Police Office provided forensic technology to aid in the crime scene reconstruction. At the end of the investigation, the case files amounted to seven gigabyte in digitally compiled reports, or 40,638 pages.

After the crime, there was a curious discovery about the tenant of an apartment on the same floor as the Lin Yue restaurant. 25-year-old computer technician Carsten B. had been awake at the time of the murders, yet was completely unaware of the events next-door because he had been playing a first person shooter video game with head phones on, with any noise muffled further by his television playing the Super Bowl XLI. Even more baffling was the fact that the assailants had actually checked the apartment floor and forcefully kicked in two of the three doors. These apartments were empty. He only found out about the murders when police asked to check his flat to ensure none of the murderers were still in the building. The only information the neighbour could provide was that he ordered food from the Lin Yue the prior evening, less than an hour before the arrival of the robbers. Separately, residents reported seeing a blue VW Polo leaving the area. On 15 February, police also searched for a white VW T4 transporter with Bremen licence plates, the owner of which was found and questioned the same day.

At around 13:10 on 5 February, 14 hours after the murders, police in Wildeshausen stopped a rented car with Düren licence plates containing Trong Duong Dao and Van Hiep Vu during a random traffic check on A 281. Dao did not have a driver's licence, and a search of his person found 0.4 grams of cocaine and €3,340 in banknotes. His passenger Vu had four phones and €1,765 on him. A search of the car for more drugs found a torn book page that had a building plan drawn on, with the flipside having the misspelled address "Hamburger Str. 9 Zittensen", a phone number, as well as "10d", and mixed number-letter codes written down. The officers initially handed the note back, but became suspicious when Dao balled up the paper and threw it under his car seat. Dao and Vu were taken into custody. Dao's clothes were found to have traces of blood, later matched to one of the victims. It was also found that Dao had initially given the name and age of his younger brother, under whose name he had rented the car. Both denied involvement, claiming to have been at a gambling arcade in Bremen at the time of the crime. The remaining three accomplices were arrested within the coming months. The Lin Yue had been chosen for robbery only a day earlier.

Crime scene investigation, which recovered leftover shell casings and traces of clothing fiber, ended on 10 February. On 15 February, Quoc Thanh Nguyen was arrested after he was connected via a phone number, but released. On 21 May and 7 June, the brothers of Dao and Vu where arrested. On 8 June, two suspects made partial admissions, but all four of the arrested men denied firing the fatal shots. Nguyen was rearrested on 27 June after testimony by the others implicated him.

In mid-May 2007, the murder weapon was found discarded in a park in Bremen's Huchting district, while a search of one of the suspects' residences found cable ties matching those used in the killings. Although police initially suspected a 9mm calibre, the weapon turned out to be loaded with .22 calibre rounds.

=== Organised crime rumours ===
Die Welt were the first newspaper to speculate about involvement of Chinese triads. In the 1990s, the rivalling 14K and Wo Shing Wo were reported to have extorted 90% of the 150 Chinese restaurants in nearby Hamburg. While no deaths occurred in relation to this, one incident led to the injury of several restaurant employees in St. Georg, though Hamburg Police emphasised shortly after the reports that no such cases were reported since 2000. Media nevertheless heavily focused on a potential triad connection, speculating that the killings were possibly the result of failure to pay protection money. Questioning of Sittensen townsfolk showed that none believed them to have any involvement with organised crime, although some speculated that the Fan couple would have resisted attempts to be intimidated. Later on, some claimed there were pre-existing rumours about Danny Fan's possible connection to the criminal underground. Stern stated that an acquaintance suspected that the Fans wanted to sell their restaurant because "the mafia" had taken one of his employees in late 2006; said employee was later identified as one of the perpetrators. One popular rumour centered around a decorative fish tank in the restaurant, as some triads in the United States used aquariums as a covert way to convey debt by the size of the tank and the number of fish.

Two days after the murders, the identities of two Vietnamese suspects were published, after which media speculated that the murders were instead related to the Vietnamese criminal underworld, particularly cigarette smugglers and human traffickers, or even a broad non-descript "Asia-Mafia", as part of a drug rivalry, gambling debt, revenge killings, or otherwise gang-related. These rumours were fuelled by the fact that the employer of some of the perpetrators reportedly played poker with Danny Fan and other restaurant owners. Other newspapers claimed that the suspects were Chinese or Chinese Vietnamese. Police considered Vietnamese perpetrators a possibility and more likely than triads, stating that they investigated a connection to the Vietnamese gang war in Berlin, drawing comparisons to two 1996 mass murders of alleged cigarette smugglers, and the two initial arrestees as potential contract killers, but refused to confirm rumors of organised crime involvement. Die Zeit indicated that investigations were hampered by a lack of cooperation from the Chinese and Vietnamese community in Lower Saxony, Bremen, and Hamburg. The term "wall of silence", previously used to describe the informal code of silence amongst Vietnamese immigrants in regards to gang violence, was frequently used as a headline in local media.

News frequently cited FOCUS, which claimed that an anonymous investigator confirmed that the special taskforce was assuming organised crime involvement, with "rituals" like tying victims up by the thumbs and single-gunshot killings being potential signs of the "yellow mafia". Berndt Georg Thamm considered Vietnamese involvement more likely than triads as the latter had less presence in Germany and operated more discreetly. The responsible police agencies declined to comment about the FOCUS report, but stated that they never seriously considered an organised crime link after the initial arrests. In court, it was also emphasised that the perpetrators were unlikely to be tied to organised crime since they hailed from wealthy parts of Vietnam, whereas Vietnamese organised crime recruits from the more impoverished central provinces.

Another false report through Bild claimed that the two-year-old girl was found under her mother Anny Fan, and that she had shielded her daughter with her body, which was heavily reprinted in Chinese news, when she had actually been left with waitress Thi Oanh Nguyen.

Liu Yuxiong, head of the Chinese-German Business Association (DCW), voiced doubts about the mafia theory, saying the organisation had no reports of protection rackets targeting Chinese restaurants in the country. He later complained about increased police searches due to profiling of Chinese delivery drivers leading to lower sales. The association also criticised the German press for making sensationalist reports and making "false accusations" against the Chinese community in Europe. A judicial scholar at the Free University of Berlin stated that the killings appeared more like a botched robbery and voiced concerns that the media response was negatively affecting the German public's view on Chinese immigrants. The day of the first reports, mafia researcher Dagobert Lindlau denied the involvement of triads, saying that "no one slaughters the cow they milk", emphasising that protection money earnings were minimal compared to other criminal ventures, and that a mass murder would attract attention for no discernible reason.

After it was shown that there were no ties to triads, it was posited by media that the robbers had intentionally staged the murders as gangland killings to lead away suspicion, despite the shooting not being part of the original plan.

== Perpetrators ==
The perpetrators were identified as two pairs of brothers and a shared friend, all living in Bremen and working for Chinese-style restaurants. All had immigrated as adolescents with their parents from coastal Vietnam. After the initial arrest, the other three were apprehended in raids on residences in Bremen's Osterholz and Arbergen districts, as well as Bremerhaven, on 6 February. Trong Duong Dao had several convictions for robbery, Phong Cao Dao had previously been convicted of assault and Van Hiep Vu had a criminal arrest record for drug possession, theft and attempted coercion. During the trial, the Vu brothers were also connected to an armed robbery at a Vietnamese family-run restaurant in Essen two weeks earlier on 21 January 2007, in which the staff was also tied up.

Nguyen had suggested the robbery to the Dao brothers, who had gambling debts of €10,000. Related to this, a Vietnamese language interpreter identified the writing "10d" as referring to Vietnamese đồng, with it being a common practice among Vietnamese diaspora in the European Union to equate one đồng with €1000.

- Trong Duong Dao (Vietnamese: Đào Trọng Dương), 33, led and planned the killings
- Phong Cao Dao (Đào Cao Phong), 29, fatally shot the victims
- Van Hiep Vu (Võ Văn Hiệp), 31, helped tie up victims and carry the stolen goods
- Van Phuong Vu (Võ Văn Phương), 40, acted as getaway driver and lookout
- Quoc Thanh Nguyen (Nguyễn Quốc Thanh), 40, former employee of the Lin Yue who informed his accomplices of the layout and shifts

== Trial ==
The trial was held in Stade district court and began on 27 August 2007. After the first court date, the lawyers of the three main defendants wanted the interpreter of their clients replaced, claiming the translations weren't understandable and that the interpreter showed bias, repeating the concern at the second court date on 11 September. The trial was suspended in December because the presiding judge had fallen ill. The trial was resumed in January 2008 and ended 13 May 2009, after 107 court dates. The trial took longer than usual due to regular appeals for postponements.

The court relied largely on crime scene reconstruction through forensic and circumstantial evidence since none of the defendants were willing to describe the course of the crime. Three of the five defendants did not make any statements during the trial. The other two, Phong Cao Dao and Van Phuong Vu, accused each other of lying about their roles in the robbery, each claiming to have stayed in the car while the other was in the Lin Yue when the shots were fired. Van Phuong Vu made his statement in June 2008 and stated that Dao had confessed to him shortly after the killings, with Dao insisting he had not intended to kill anyone and only aiming the gun at those inside as an intimidation tactic. Dao gave a different version of events in August 2008, saying that while Vu was the designated driver and lookout, he himself had left the restaurant shortly after entry due to nausea from alcohol and drug use the same day, with Vu going inside while Dao rested in the car. Vu rejected Dao's statement, adding to his previous statement that he had seen Dao loading and suppressing his gun while in the car. The court ultimately identified Phong Cao Dao as the shooter through Vu's testimony, with his brother Trong Duong Dao identified as the leading member during the robbery and the one to order the killing of the five latter victims.

The main perpetrators, the Dao brothers, were both given life sentences for seven counts of murder and aggravated robbery, which may usually be paroled after 15 years. As the shooter, Phong Cao Dao was unlikely to be eligible for parole, under consideration of aggravated circumstances (murder as a means to cover up a different crime) and base motives (greed). Van Hiep Vu received 14 years imprisonment for aggravated robbery; 14 years are the second-harshest sentence short of life imprisonment. Van Phuong Vu received four years and nine months for aiding robbery. Quoc Thanh Nguyen was sentenced to five years imprisonment for incitement to robbery, after he was the only of the defendants to issue a confession. The Dao and Vu brothers appealed their sentences, but the applications were denied as meritless by the Federal Court of Justice in October 2010.

=== Incarceration status ===
Van Phuong Vu received early release in October 2010 for good behaviour. In May 2011, Quoc Thanh Nguyen was also released before his full sentence. The sentence of Van Hiep Vu was commuted in July 2016, receiving conditional discharge the same month.

It was initially announced that the perpetrators, with the exception of Van Phuong Vu, who held German citizenship, would be deported after serving their sentences, but this did not occur, due to concerns that the men could face the death penalty in Vietnam. As of 2017, only brothers Trong Duong Dao and Phong Cao Dao remained incarcerated. Unlike his brother, Trong Duong Dao had the possibility of parole in 2024.

== Aftermath ==
In February 2007, a small-scale memorial service was held at Sittensen's chapel. After the crime scene investigation was complete, the restaurant was closed down. As of 2017, a video store and a hairdresser had opened in the former restaurant areas.

Until the trial of the perpetrators, the surviving Fan daughter (referred to by various aliases in media due to her age) was put under witness protection for several months due to fear that she may be targeted as a loose end and relocated along with her maternal grandmother, who lived near Sittensen. She had reportedly only uttered the words "Evil men were here" when she was found and continued to ask for her parents while in hiding. Upon hearing the news, Li Lu, a former Beijing professional volleyball player based in Germany, filed adoption forms so that she and her husband, DCW president Liu Yuxiong, could take in the girl if granted. By December 2007, the girl lived in Hanover with her grandmother. In May 2014, Braunschweig court decided that the grandmother had the right to surviving dependants' pension, requiring the city of Hanover to relinquish withheld payments since 2007. They had reportedly moved to somewhere else within the European Union by 2017.

In July 2014, celebrity cook Steffen Henssler received criticism for featuring Van Hiep Vu on his television show "Henssler hinter Gittern" ("Henssler behind bars"), a cooking program which claimed to have the goal of resocialising inmates and teaching them gastronomy skills for work upon release. Van Hiep Vu, a former restaurant cook, appeared in its first episode filmed at JVA Bremen-Oslebshausen. Landtag of Lower Saxony member Jens Nacke (CDU) called for the suspension of "Henssler hinter Gittern", calling Vu's show appearance "the public exhibition of a hardened criminal" and compared it to "a modern-day human curiosity show". The TV network RTL, Oslebenshausen prison, and Bremen's Department of Justice defended the show, arguing it "fulfilled the societal duty of displaying transparency of the criminal justice system".

== See also ==
- Wah Mee massacre
- Brown's Chicken massacre
- Wendy's massacre
- Lane Bryant shooting
