= Chinese Community Bulletin Board =

Bulletin board in Seattle, Washington, U.S.

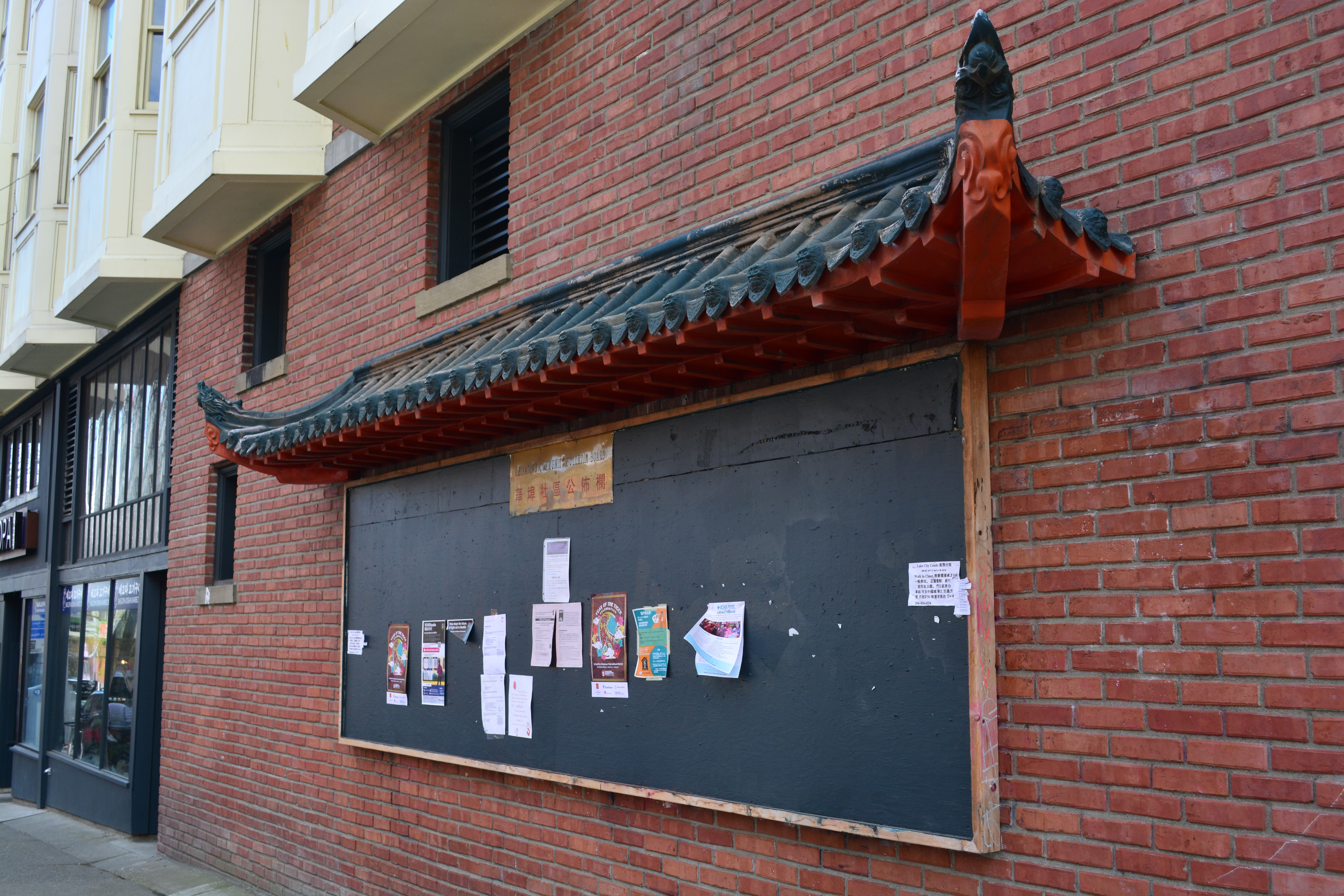
- The bulletin board in 2022

- Location within Downtown Seattle
- Coordinates: 47°35′53.5″N 122°19′26.1″W

The Chinese Community Bulletin Board (also known as the Chinatown Community Bulletin Board, traditional Chinese: 華埠社區公佈欄; simplified Chinese: 华埠社区公布栏) is installed on the eastern exterior of the Louisa Hotel in Seattle's Chinatown―International District, in the U.S. state of Washington. Located at 511 Seventh Ave. S, the board was installed in the 1960s and designated a Seattle Historic Landmark in 1976. KING-TV has called the fixture "Seattle's original social media board". King County has included the board as a point of interest in a walking tour of the district.

== See also ==
- List of Seattle landmarks
