= Brown's Chicken & Pasta =

Chicago-based fast-food restaurant chain

Brown's Chicken
- Company type: Private
- Industry: Restaurants
- Founded: 1949; 77 years ago
- Headquarters: Villa Park, Illinois, United States
- Website: brownschicken.com

Brown's Chicken & Pasta, also known simply as Brown's Chicken, is an American chain of fast food restaurants specializing in fried chicken. It is based in the Chicago metropolitan area.

== History ==
The chain traces its origins to 1949, when John and Belva Brown opened a restaurant in Bridgeview, Illinois. Brown's expanded to many locations throughout the United States in the 1970s. In the 1980s, pasta was added to the menu and eventually to the name of the company. In the 1990s, a traditional grill named "The Chicago Way" was added to all Brown's restaurants. After 2005, the company contracted their locations to exclusively within the Chicago metropolitan area. Former company president Frank Portillo is the brother of Dick Portillo, founder and former owner of The Portillo Restaurant Group, which was sold to Berkshire Partners in 2014. According to the company's website, there are 22 restaurants as of 2024.

== Brown's Chicken massacre ==
On January 8, 1993, the Brown's Chicken massacre occurred at a Palatine, Illinois, branch. Seven people were killed, including both owners and five employees, all of whom were found bound in the walk-in freezer. In 2002, James Degorski and Juan Luna were arrested for the murders. In May 2007, Luna was convicted for his part in the murders and sentenced to life imprisonment. On September 28, 2009, James Degorski was found guilty of the murders. The massacre had an adverse effect on the entire Brown's Chicken chain. Sales at all restaurants dropped by 35 percent within months of the incident, and the company eventually closed 100 restaurants in the Chicago area.

== See also ==
- List of fast-food chicken restaurants
