= Louisa Hotel =

Building in Seattle, United States

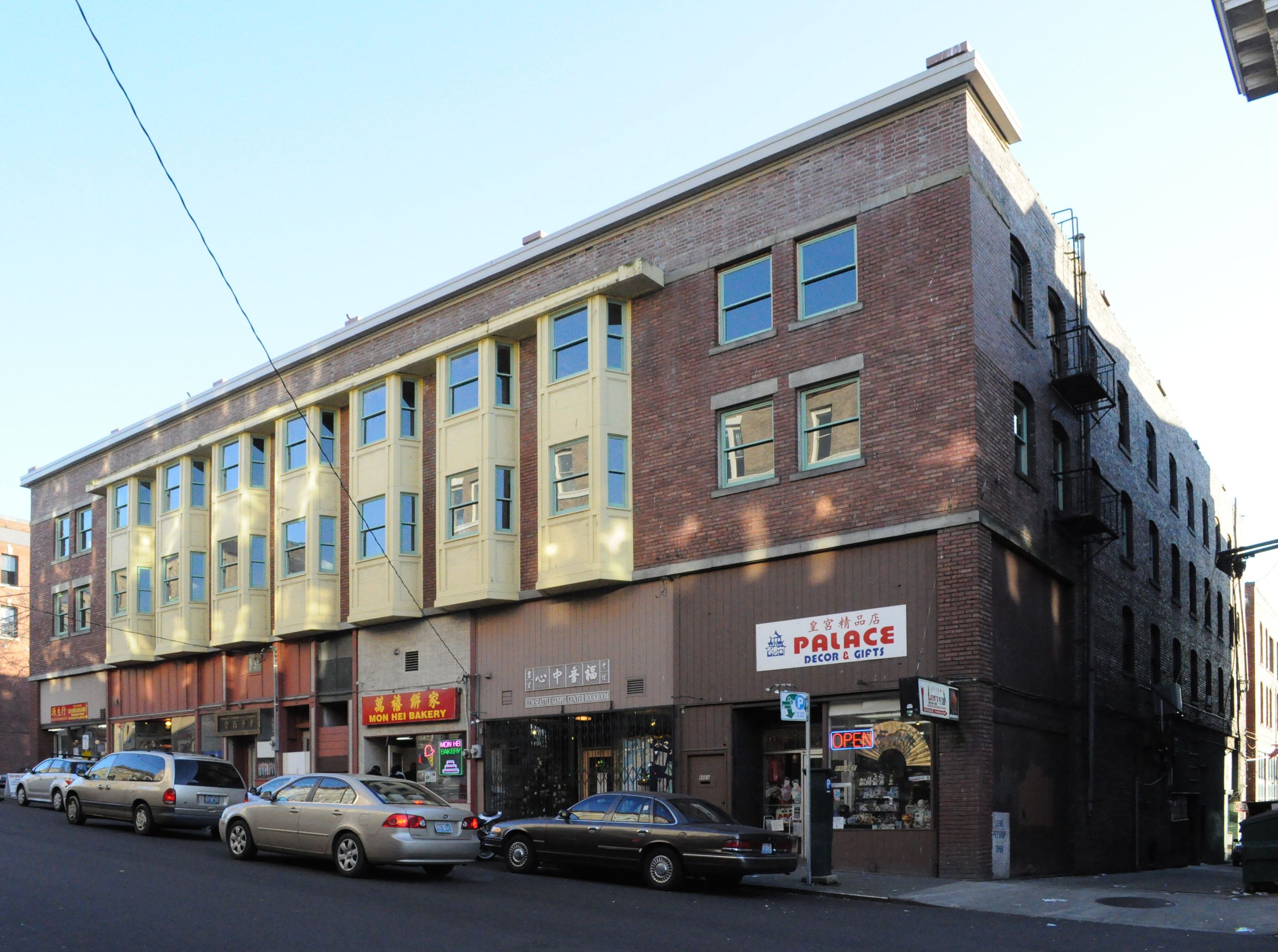
- Interactive map of the Louisa Hotel area

General information
- Location: Chinatown-International District, Seattle, United States
- Coordinates: 47°35′53″N 122°19′27″W
- Completed: 1909

The Louisa Hotel is a building in Chinatown-International District, Seattle. In 1983 it was the scene of the Wah Mee massacre, the deadliest mass murder in Washington state history.

== Description and history ==
The Louisa Hotel was designed in 1909 by Willatzen & Byrne as the Nelson, Tagholm, and Jensen Building (named after the investors) at 665 South King Street, on the block bounded by 7th Avenue South and Maynard Alley South. It was also known at some time as the Hudson Hotel. Paul Woo purchased the building in 1963 for US$160,000 (equivalent to $1,680,000 in 2025). It functioned as a single room occupancy hotel (SRO) with street-level spaces for shops and restaurants until 1970, when a string of deadly fires led to tightened building codes; unable to comply, the second and third floor residential spaces were closed. The street-level businesses continued, including a pet shop and Mon Hei Bakery, the first Chinese bakery in Seattle.

Two nightclubs operated in the basement space of the Louisa Hotel by the 1920s. They were accessed using separate entrances; the one in the eastern part of the basement, named Club Royale, was entered from 511 1/2 7th Ave S, and the one in the western half, entered from Maynard Alley South, was named Blue Heaven. Club Royale was later known as the Chinese Garden's Club (aka Bucket of Blood, for the pails used to serve drinks), and was raided February 11, 1931.

At the height of the Blue Heaven, patrons of many ethnic backgrounds visited for the gambling, dancing, and other forms of entertainment. By the 1950s, the club had been renamed to Wah Mee (華美; 'Beautiful China'), known for high-stakes gaming. The Wah Mee operated illegally, as contemporary local blue laws required clubs to close before midnight; it was raided by police in 1972. By the 1980s, the Wah Mee had gained a much seedier reputation as a dive bar. On the night of February 18–19, 1983 it was the site of the Wah Mee massacre, the deadliest mass murder in Washington state history.

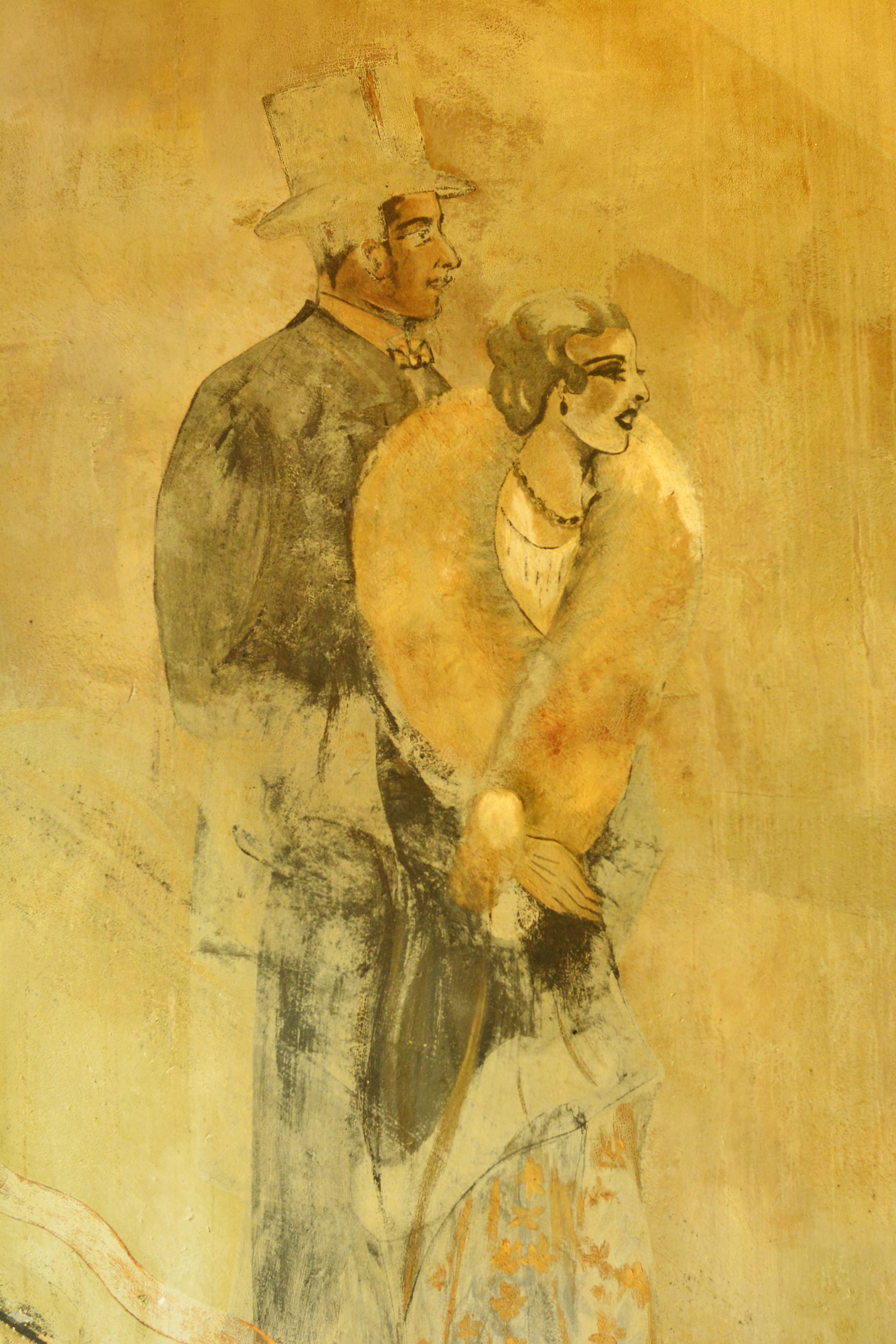
Detail of the mural on the south side of the staircase leading to the former site of the Club Royale

After the shooting, the doors on Maynard Alley that led to the Wah Mee Club were padlocked shut, but the building continued to host street-level businesses until Christmas Eve, 2013, when a fire destroyed the top floor and interior of the building.

The Woo family, who still owned the building, decided to demolish the fire-damaged portion (which included all of the former Wah Mee space) while retaining most of the exterior walls to preserve its contribution to the Chinatown Historic District. They worked with the Seattle Chinatown International District Preservation and Development Authority to preserve as much as possible. Demolition work was completed in April 2015. Reconstruction began February 12, 2018, with a blessing by Buddhist monks and a procession. The Louisa Hotel building reopened June 2019, with 85 rental apartments plus street-level retail and restaurant space. The ornately roofed Chinatown Community Bulletin Board (also known as Chinese Community Bulletin Board), a designated Seattle Historic Landmark is on the east (Seventh Avenue South) outside wall of the building. While the Seattle Chinese Post (founded 1982) and, more recently, the Internet this was at one time a crucial information link for Seattle's Chinese-speakers.

The renovations after the fire revealed a number of murals from the Club Royale, most of them in a staircase leading down from Seventh Avenue South. They had been aware of the murals on the south (exterior-wall) side of the staircase, and over the door at the bottom but additional murals were revealed on the north side of the stairs during the removal of a flour chute from the street to the basement, used by the Mon Hei bakery. Preserving these required a revision to some of the renovation plans. The staircase murals can now be seen from the street, through glass.

The Woos first went public about the murals February 6, 2018, six days before reconstruction began. The murals on the staircase depict elegantly dressed men and women, some of them African American, some White, and some (in the words of building co-owner Anita Woo) "racially ambiguous." Other murals, also found during demolition and preserved as part of rehabilitation, depict "a peacock, a vase of flowers, and hanging paper lanterns surrounded by bamboo." Various precautions were taken to preserve and restore these murals. It is uncertain who created the murals, although the evidence points toward either Ted Tagholm or Louella Tagholm. They were children of the building’s original owners (who owned it in the relevant period), and both were commercial artists.
