= Lane Bryant murders =

2008 mass shooting in Illinois, U.S.

- Location: 41.54748°N 87.79375°W; Tinley Park, Illinois, U.S.
- Date: February 2, 2008; 18 years ago c. 10:45 a.m. (UTC−06:00)
- Attack type: Mass murder; mass shooting; armed robbery; sexual assault
- Weapon: .40 caliber Glock handgun
- Deaths: 5
- Injuries: 1
- Perpetrator: Unknown
- Motive: Unknown

The Lane Bryant murders was an incident of mass murder at a Lane Bryant clothing outlet in the Brookside Marketplace in Tinley Park, Illinois, United States, a suburb of Chicago, that occurred on February 2, 2008. The shooting resulted in five people killed and a sixth injured. Police said the attack appeared to have been a botched robbery attempt, though the motive of the shooting remains unknown for certain.

The identity of the shooter remains unknown. The incident has been called the largest unsolved mass shooting in modern American history.

== Shooting ==
The gunman entered the back door and had a brief conversation with some of the victims. Sources say the gunman attempted to feign a delivery, but became increasingly agitated as time progressed, and announced a robbery.

Four customers, a part-time employee and the store manager were taken to the back of the store and shot. Five of them, all women, were killed; the part-time employee was wounded but survived. The five fatal victims had all been shot in the head execution style, and the sixth woman survived because she shifted her head right before being shot, causing the bullet to only graze her neck. At least one of the victims was sexually assaulted by the perpetrator. Police found the victims shortly after receiving an emergency call at 10:45 a.m. Police said the attack appeared to have been a botched robbery attempt, though the motive of the shooting remains unknown for certain.

The five deceased victims were:

- Jennifer L. Bishop, age 34, of South Bend, Indiana (customer)
- Carrie Hudek Chiuso, age 33, of Frankfort (customer)
- Rhoda McFarland, age 42, of Joliet (store manager)
- Sarah T. Szafranski, age 22, of Oak Forest (customer)
- Connie R. Woolfolk, age 37, of Flossmoor (customer)

The police withheld the age and identity of the surviving victim, the part-time employee of the store.

== Aftermath ==
The shopping center was closed and locked down while being searched. It was reopened after police found that the gunman had left the immediate area.

On February 5, 2008, a $55,000 reward, primarily sponsored by Lane Bryant's parent company, Charming Shoppes Inc., was offered for information leading to the gunman's arrest. On February 6, 2008, Lane Bryant also announced the establishment of The Lane Bryant Tinley Park Memorial Fund in honor of the five women who were killed. Lane Bryant also offered to pay for the victims' funerals.

Police released a sketch of the suspect on February 11, 2008, receiving two dozen leads in the first 24 hours.

The store building itself remained unused for six years and was then remodeled into a T.J. Maxx.

As of 2026, police say they have never stopped investigating the crime and that detectives continue to review tips and evidence. The promised reward for information leading to an arrest and conviction was increased to $200,000.

== See also ==
- Brown's Chicken massacre (1993), a similar murder of employees, in Palatine, Illinois, eventually leading to convictions of two men in 2007 and 2009
- Burger Chef murders (1978), a similar unsolved murder of employees, in Speedway, Indiana
- Blackfriars Massacre (1978), another unsolved mass shooting with five people killed, in Boston, Massachusetts, likely to have been an attempted robbery and to have been related to the Boston-area Irish mob or the American Mafia
- List of homicides in Illinois
