= Brown's Chicken massacre =

1993 mass murder in Palatine, Illinois, U.S.

- Location: 42°07′22″N 88°02′53″W; Palatine, Illinois, U.S.
- Date: January 8, 1993; 33 years ago
- Attack type: Armed robbery, mass shooting, mass murder
- Weapons: Snub-nosed Smith & Wesson Model 60 .38-caliber revolver; Knife
- Deaths: 7
- Perpetrators: Juan Luna and James Degorski
- Motive: Robbery; Witness elimination

The Brown's Chicken massacre was a mass murder that occurred on January 8, 1993, in Palatine, Illinois, when two robbers shot and killed seven employees at a Brown's Chicken fast-food restaurant.

The case remained unsolved for more than nine years, until one of the assailants was implicated by his girlfriend in 2002. Police used DNA samples from the murder scene to match one of the suspects, Juan Luna. Luna was put on trial in 2007, found guilty of seven counts of first degree murder, and sentenced to life imprisonment. James Degorski, the other assailant, was found guilty in 2009 on all seven counts of first degree murder, and sentenced to life imprisonment without parole.

== Incident ==
On January 8, 1993, seven people were shot and killed at the Brown's Chicken & Pasta at 168 West Northwest Highway in Palatine. The victims included the owners, 50-year-old Richard E. Ehlenfeldt and 49-year-old Lynn A. Ehlenfeldt (née Wiese), and five employees: 46-year-old Guadalupe Maldonado, 16-year-old Michael C. Castro, 17-year-old Rico L. Solis, 32-year-old Thomas Mennes, and 31-year-old Marcus Nellsen; Castro and Solis were Palatine High School students working there part-time. All victims had been killed in two walk-in freezers. Six victims were shot multiple times, Lynn Ehlenfeldt also had her throat slashed before being shot one time, and Michael Castro was stabbed in the stomach after being shot. A total of 21 rounds were discharged inside the restaurant that night. Before they left, the culprits picked up all shell casings, mopped up some of the blood, and disabled the electricity, leaving the restaurant's clock frozen at 9:52 PM. The assailants stole between $1,800 and $1,900 from the restaurant, equivalent to $4,123 in 2025.

Two of the Ehlenfeldts' daughters were scheduled to be at the restaurant that night, but were not present at the time of the killing. A third daughter, Jennifer, was later elected to the Wisconsin Senate.

Michael Castro's parents called the police a couple hours after closing time. Later, Guadalupe Maldonado's wife also called the police, concerned that her husband did not return home from work and that his car was still in the apparently closed Brown's Chicken parking lot. When officers arrived at the building, they spotted the rear employees' door open. Inside, they found the seven bodies, some face-down, some face-up, in a cooler and in a walk-in refrigerator. When Palatine police found the bodies, it was more than 5½ hours after the 9 p.m. closing. The final recorded purchase that was made at the Brown's Chicken establishment was a four-piece meal that was sold at 9:08 p.m.

== Perpetrators ==
Juan Luna
- Born: Juan Antonio Luna Jr. February 16, 1974 (age 52); Zacatecas, Mexico
- Status: Incarcerated
- Conviction: First degree murder (7 counts)
- Penalty: Life imprisonment without parole

Details
- Date: January 8, 1993
- Country: United States
- Location: Palatine, Illinois
- Killed: 7
- Date apprehended: May 16, 2002
- Imprisoned at: Stateville Correctional Center

James Degorski
- Born: James Eric Degorski; August 20, 1972 (age 54); Chicago, Illinois, United States
- Status: Incarcerated
- Conviction: First degree murder (7 counts)
- Penalty: Life imprisonment without parole

Details
- Date: January 8, 1993
- Country: United States
- Location: Palatine, Illinois
- Killed: 7
- Date apprehended: May 16, 2002
- Imprisoned at: Stateville Correctional Center

Paul Dennis Reid was considered a possible suspect in the Brown's Chicken incident. He was arrested for three sets of murders in 1997, all committed during robberies at fast food establishments in Tennessee, about 500 miles (800 km) away. Beyond the similarities of killings at fast food restaurants, Reid wore a similar shoe size to prints left by the killer, drove a red car similar to one possibly driven by the Brown's suspect, and was taller than average as was the suspect.

In March 2002, more than nine years after the murders, Anne Lockett came forward and implicated her former boyfriend, James Degorski, and his associate, Juan Luna, in the crime. Degorski and Luna had been childhood friends and attended William Fremd High School together. Luna, then aged 18, was a former employee of the restaurant. In April 2002, the Palatine Police Department matched a DNA sample from Luna to a sample of saliva from a piece of partially eaten chicken found in the garbage during the crime scene investigation.

The chicken was kept in a freezer for most of the time since the crime. Testimony at trial indicated it was not frozen for several days after discovery, and was allowed to thaw several times for examination and testing, in the hope of an eventual match via increasingly sophisticated testing methods not available in 1993.

The Palatine Police Department took the two suspects into custody on May 16, 2002. Luna confessed to the crime during an interrogation, though his lawyers later claimed that he was coerced to do so through police brutality and had his family, who were Mexican nationals, threatened with deportation. Degorski also confessed and an audio recording of it played during his trial, although his lawyers similarly contended that the confession was obtained under duress. Both men subsequently went to trial.

On May 10, 2007, Juan Luna was found guilty of all seven counts of murder. He was sentenced to life in prison without parole on May 17. The state sought the death penalty, which was available at the time, but the jury's vote of 11-1 in favor of the death penalty fell short of the required unanimity to impose it. In 2017, an action was filed by the U.S. government to revoke Luna's naturalized citizenship, which he had obtained in the time between the murders and his arrest, but the courts denied the motion in 2019.

On September 29, 2009, James Degorski was found guilty of all seven counts of murder, largely on the testimony of his former girlfriend Anne Lockett and another woman, Eileen Bakalla, who both stated that Degorski separately confessed to them. Luna had also implicated Degorski during his own confession in 2002. On October 20, 2009, he was sentenced to life in prison without parole. All but two of the jurors voted for a death sentence.

In March 2014, a jury awarded James Degorski $451,000 in compensation and punitive damages after being beaten by a Sheriff's deputy in Cook County Jail in May 2002. He suffered facial fractures that required surgery. The deputy was eventually dismissed.

Degorski appealed the verdict in 2016 and 2022, claiming that Luna had been the sole perpetrator and again calling Lockett's testimony uncredible due to her record for psychiatric issues and past drug addiction. In 2016, Degorski also presented a sworn statement by fellow inmate Richard Bilik, whom Lockett had been dating during their own relationship, who alleged that Lockett had repeatedly asked him about the Brown's Chicken murders, after which Des Plaines and Palatine police took him in for questioning; Bilik had been serving a 15-year sentence for arson since 2012. The appeals were denied both times in court.

== Aftermath ==
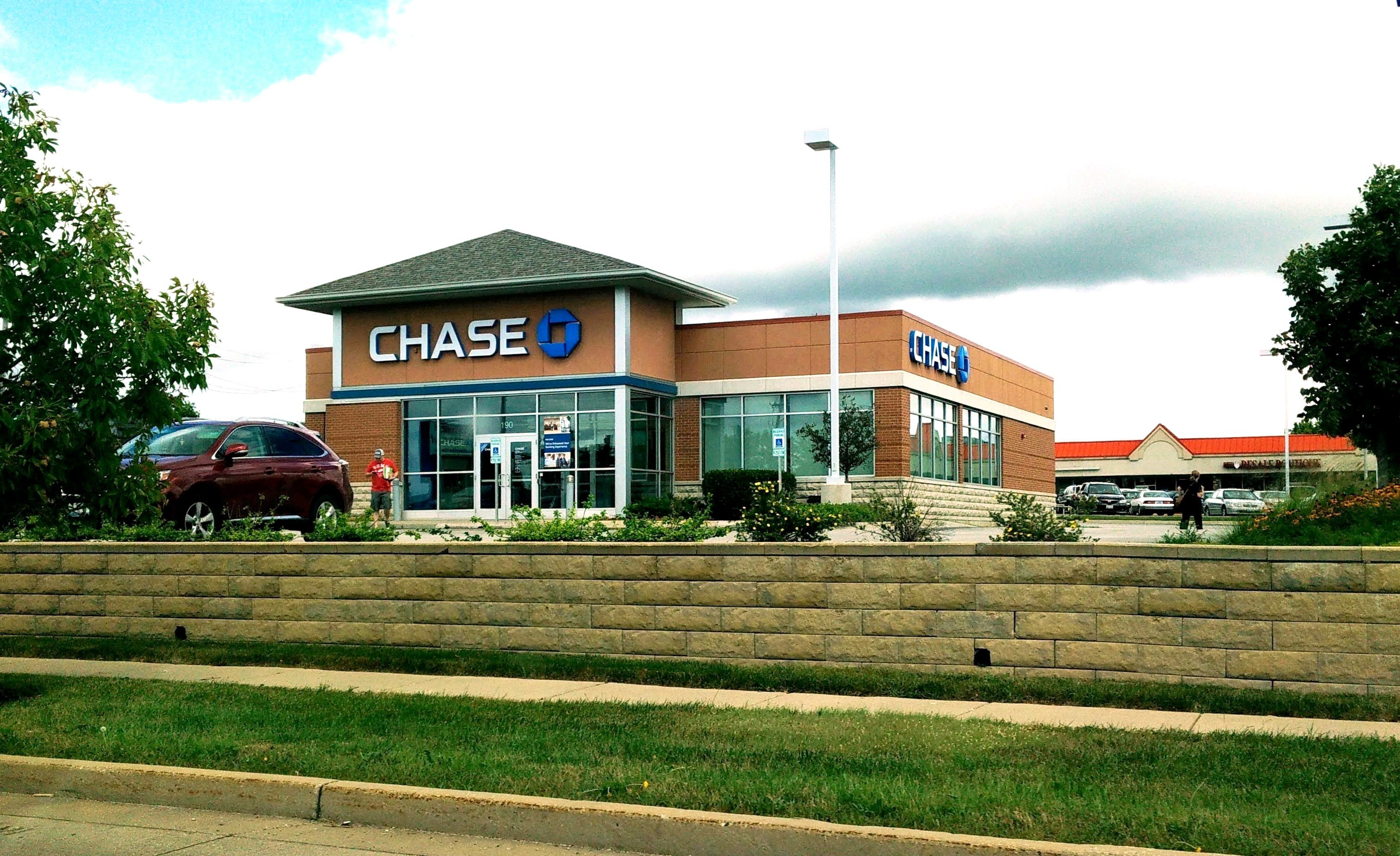
The Chase Bank branch where the Brown's Chicken restaurant once stood

The incident had an adverse effect on the entire Brown's Chicken franchise. Sales at all restaurants dropped 35 percent within months of the incident, and the company eventually had to close 100 restaurants in the Chicago area.

The building briefly held a dry cleaning establishment, and was razed in April 2001 after which the lot was vacant for several years. In 2009, a Chase Bank branch office was constructed at the former Brown's location.

Luna and Degorski were imprisoned at the Stateville Correctional Center, but that facility closed in 2025. Luna is now held at the Danville Correctional Center and Degorski was moved to the Graham Correctional Center.

== See also ==
- List of multiple homicides in Illinois
- Lane Bryant shooting, a similar murder of shoppers and workers on February 2, 2008, in Tinley Park, Illinois
- List of massacres in Illinois
