= History of Chinese Americans in Seattle =

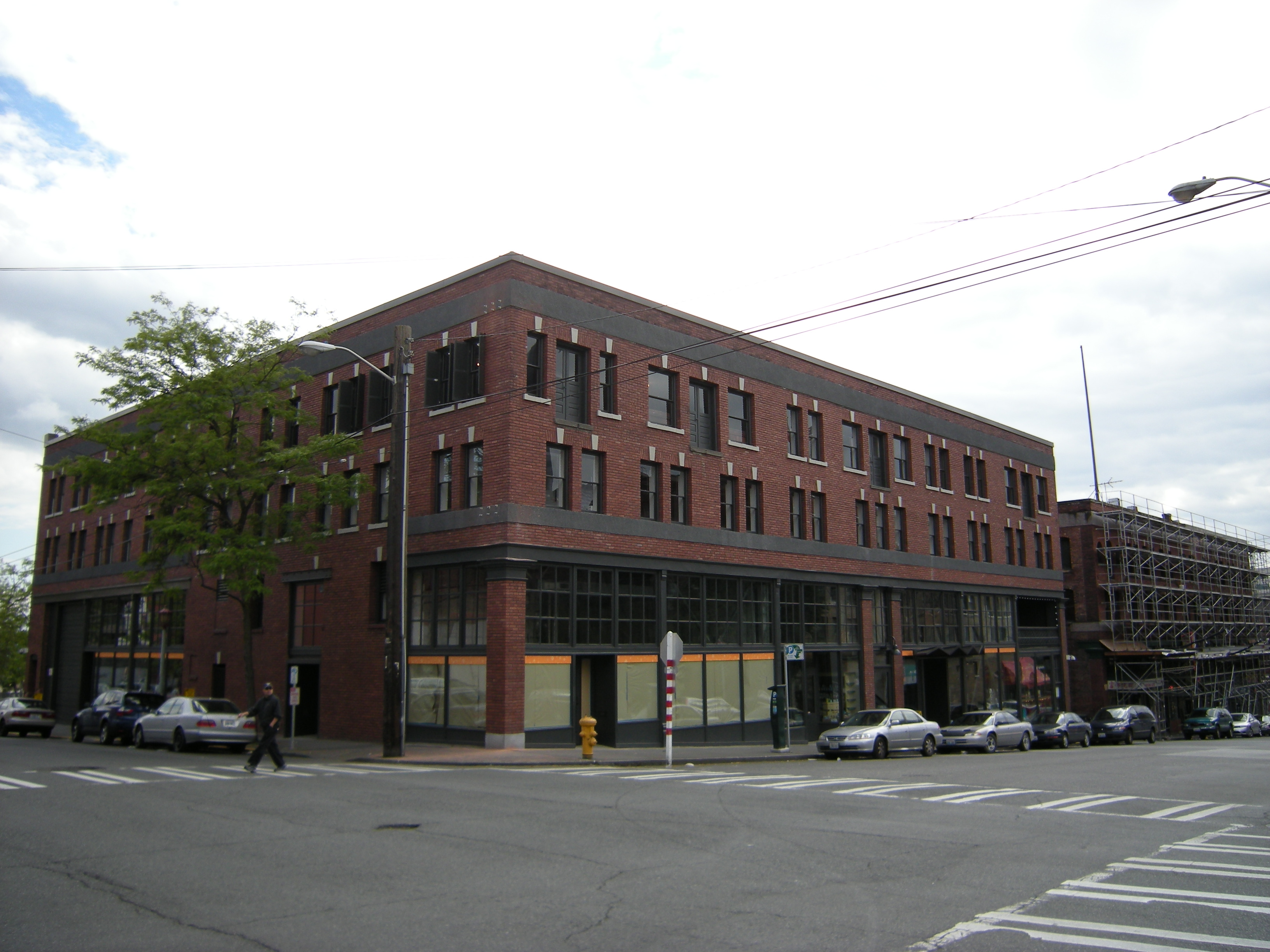
The Wing Luke Museum of the Asian Pacific American Experience, housed in the restored 1910 East Kong Yick Building

Greater Seattle has had a Chinese American community almost since its founding in 1851. Chinese workers arriving in the 1860s were welcomed, because the Seattle area was sparsely settled and workers were needed; within a few decades, however, newly arrived white settlers resented the Chinese workers, and there were several anti-Chinese riots as the whites attempted to expel the Chinese from the area. Chinese settlement persisted, with the immigrants settling in a well-defined Chinatown where they maintained their culture through family groups, associations, and churches. In the mid-20th century Chinese Americans joined with other immigrant groups to oppose racial discrimination. In 1962 a Chinese American became the first person of Asian ancestry to hold elective office in the state of Washington.

== History ==
Chinese people were the first Asians to settle in Seattle, arriving directly from China or via San Francisco in the 1860s. The majority of these immigrants came from the area around Guangzhou (Canton). They worked as fishermen, cannery and mill workers, miners, loggers, or domestic help. Later they worked on railroad construction and building projects. Initially welcomed because of the region's labor shortage, the Chinese later became resented as more white settlers arrived. This resentment was felt in other states as well, notably California, and in 1882 it led to the passage of the federal Chinese Exclusion Act.

Racial tension in the Washington Territory came to a head in the 1880s during an economic recession. White workers, particularly mine workers, believed the Chinese workers were taking their jobs, and resorted to rioting and force to make the Chinese leave. The Seattle riot of 1886 led to the forced expulsion of some 350 Chinese men; many others left voluntarily. Other anti-Chinese riots in the area included the Tacoma riot of 1885 and the Attack on Squak Valley Chinese laborers, 1885 in what is now Issaquah. President Grover Cleveland ordered federal military forces into Seattle and other parts of the Washington Territory to restore order. In 1886, Washington Territory added a constitutional provision barring aliens ineligible for citizenship from owning property, which effectively prohibited Chinese immigrants from land ownership.

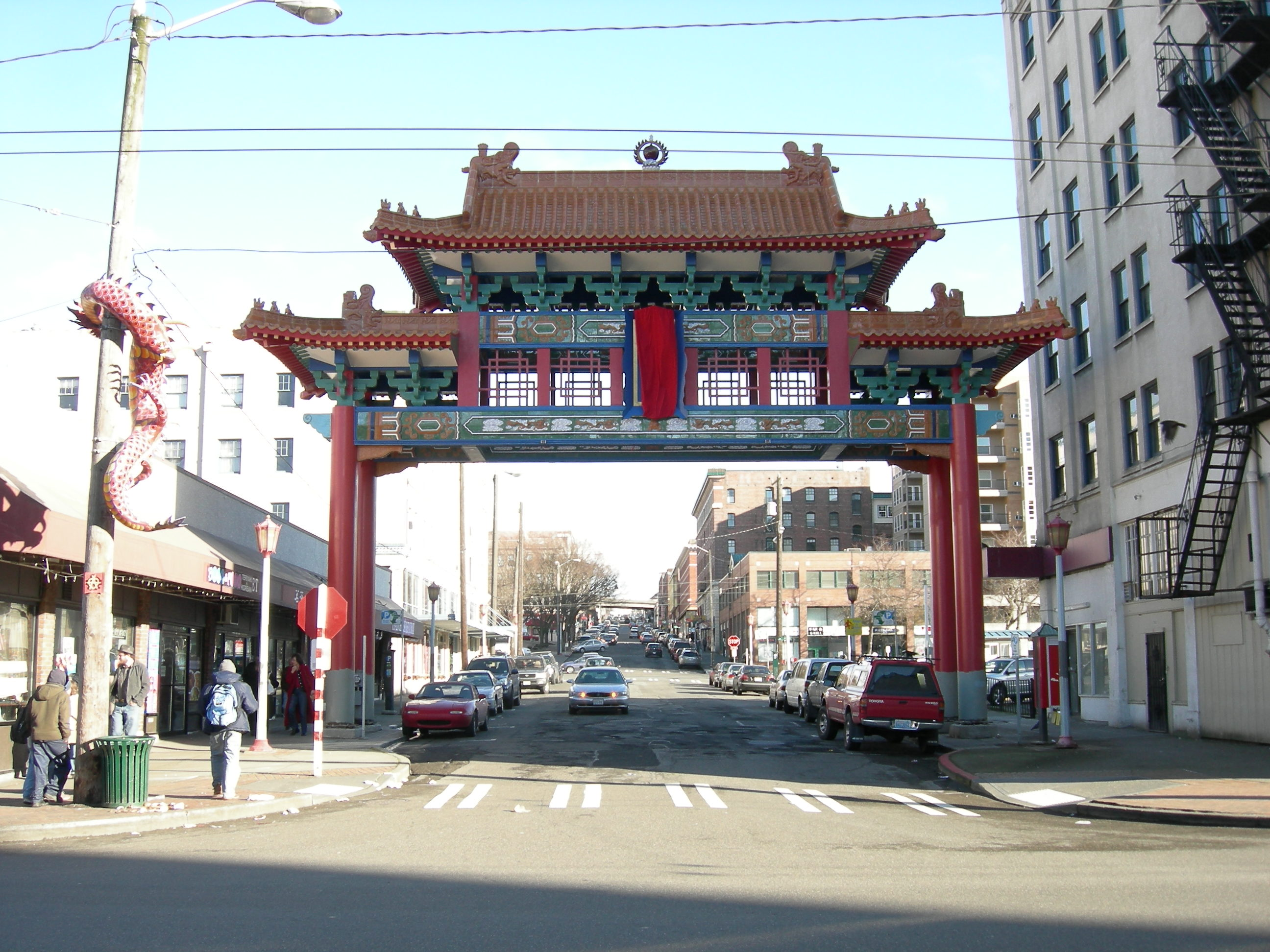
The "Historic Chinatown Gate" in Chinatown, completed in 2008

At first the Chinese workers settled along the eastern edge of Pioneer Square, in the area now occupied by the 2nd Avenue Extension. A new Chinatown grew up in the early 1900s on fill land south of Pioneer Square. Its Wa Chong Co. was the first Asian-owned manufacturing business in America. Japanese and Filipino residents also settled there. By the 1930s Chinatown and "Japantown" were distinct neighborhoods. Elementary schooling for children from both Seattle's Chinatown and Japantown primarily took place at Seattle's Main Street School and, later, Bailey Gatzert.

The Internment of Japanese Americans during World War II led to the abandonment of Japan Town and its takeover by other ethnic groups from Asia and the Pacific Islands. In 1951 the area was renamed the Seattle Chinatown-International District to reflect its growing diversity.

In the 1930s, the Chinese American community united with the Japanese American and Filipino American communities to fight a proposed ban on interracial marriage. Later the same communities rallied against other discriminatory practices such as restrictive housing and racial preference in hiring. In the late 1960s, inspired by the Civil Rights Movement and student opposition to the Vietnam War, these traditional coalitions were formalized as the Asian Coalition for Equality, the Oriental Student Movement, and the Asian American Student Coalition.

In 1962 Wing Luke became the first Asian American to hold elected office (Seattle City Council) in Washington state.

The Wah Mee massacre, in which 13 people were killed during a robbery, took place in Seattle's Chinatown–International District in 1983.

In 1997 Gary Locke was elected governor of the state of Washington, becoming the first, and as of 2014 the only, Chinese American to serve as governor of a state; in 2009 he became the first Chinese American ambassador to China.

== Demographics ==
As of the 2010 United States census, there were 45,018 Chinese Americans living in King County, including 3,088 who identified themselves as Taiwanese. Members of the Chinese American community run the gamut from those whose families have lived in the United States for generations to recent immigrants.

== Culture ==
Chinese settlers in the Seattle area maintained their identity through tongs and family associations such as Gee How Oak Tin. The Chong Wa Benevolent Association, a coalition of Chinese American groups and businesses, was chartered in 1910. Churches such as the Chinese Baptist Church also served to unite the community.

The Wing Luke Museum of the Asian Pacific American Experience (nicknamed "The Wing") is located in the Chinatown-International District and is housed in the East Kong Yick Building, a restored 1910 building. It is an affiliate of the Smithsonian Institution.

== Media ==
The Seattle Chinese Times is published in Seattle.

Chinese Radio Seattle (simplified Chinese: 西雅图中文电台; traditional Chinese: 西雅圖中文電臺; pinyin: Xīyǎtú Zhōngwén Diàntái) operates on 1150 AM.

Seattle Chinese Portal (simplified Chinese: 西雅图中文网; traditional Chinese: 西雅圖中文網;

== Education ==
The Northwest Chinese School (simplified Chinese: 西北中文学校; traditional Chinese: 西北中文學校; pinyin: Xīběi Zhōngwén Xuéxiào), which teaches Chinese, mathematics, and other classes to students aged 4–18, is held at Newport High School in Bellevue. It is the largest weekend Chinese school in the United States. As of 2013 95% of the students are of Asian ancestry while 5% are not.

The Seattle Chinese School (simplified Chinese: 西雅图华文学校; traditional Chinese: 西雅圖華文學校; pinyin: Xīyǎtú Huáwén Xuéxiào) holds its classes at Interlake High School in Bellevue.

== Notable residents ==
- Ron Chew
- Charlie Chong
- Ruby Chow
- Bruce Lee
- Ed Lee
- Eric Liu
- Gary Locke
- Keye Luke
- Wing Luke
- Sui Sin Far
- Donnie Chin

== See also ==
- History of Seattle before 1900 § Relations between whites and Chinese
- History of the Japanese in Seattle
