= Ron Chew =

American museum director, oral historian, and journalist

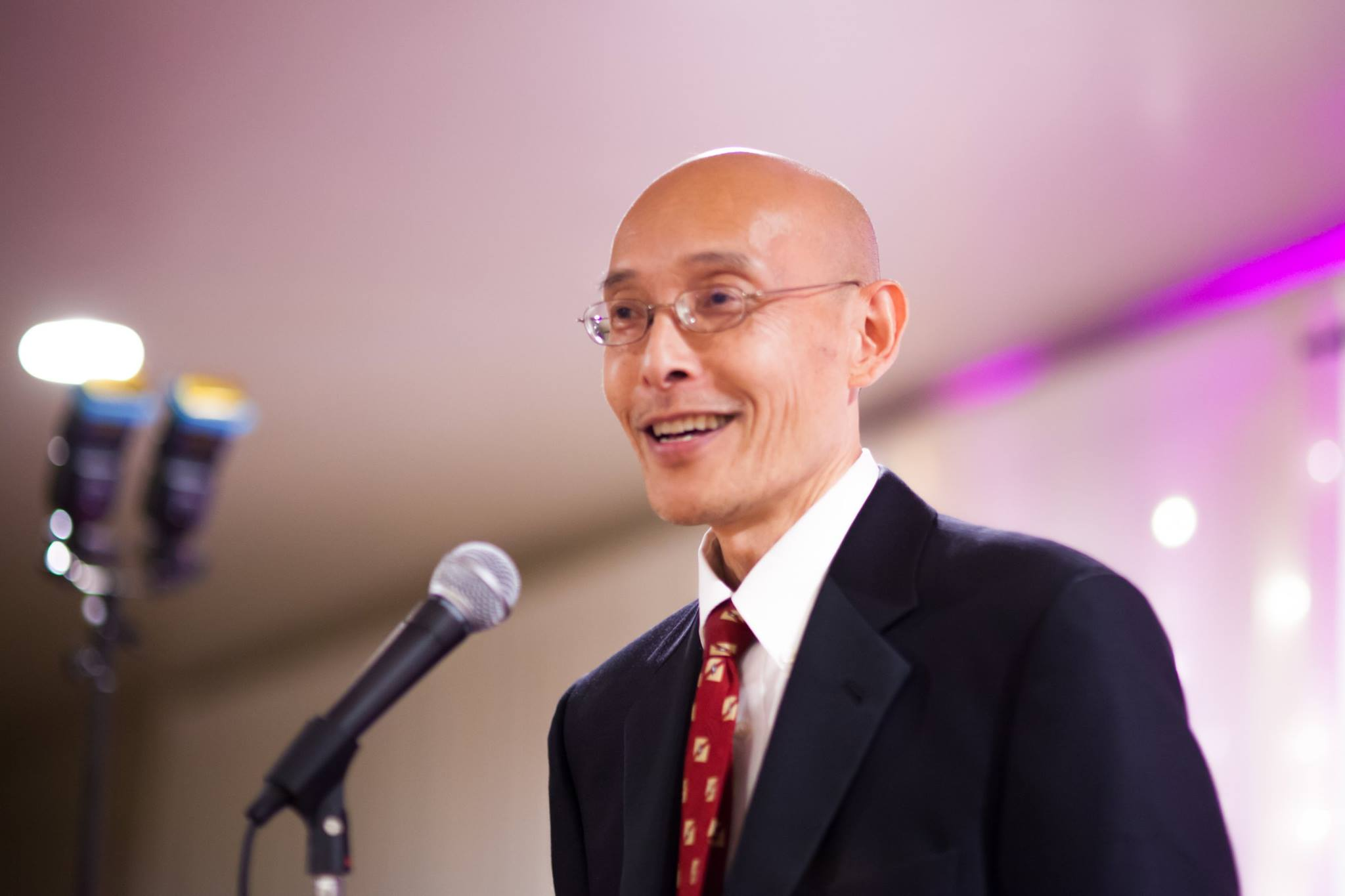
Ron Chew, photo by Media 4 Movement

Ron Chew (born Ronald A. Chew, May 17, 1953) is an American consultant, journalist, oral historian, Asian American community leader, community organizer, and activist. He has been an advocate for the community-based model of museum exhibit development. Chew is the former executive director of the Wing Luke Museum, former editor and former board president of the International Examiner, and former director of the International Community Health Services (ICHS) Foundation. He serves as a trustee on the board of the Seattle Public Library (SPL). Chew lives in Seattle, Washington.

== Biography ==
Chew was born in Seattle to Chinese immigrants. His mother was a garment worker and his father worked a waiter at the Hong Kong Restaurant on Maynard Avenue South in Seattle's Chinatown-International District (CID). Chew attended Franklin High School and the University of Washington. At the university, he studied journalism and worked as a reporter at the Daily. In his senior year, he applied for the position of editor, but faculty gave the position to a white student who hadn't applied. This prompted Chew to formally charge the Daily with discrimination. Shortly after, Chew left the UW to work at the International Examiner in Seattle's Chinatown-International District. Ultimately the lawsuit vindicated Chew, but he did not return to the UW to finish his studies.

Chew began working as a journalist at the International Examiner in 1975. In 1977, he became the newspaper's editor. During his tenure he collaborated with other current and emerging community leaders and Asian American activists, such as Donnie Chin and Robert "Uncle Bob" Santos. The newspaper covered local events, social justice concerns, and political issues facing residents of the International District, including substandard housing and health care for poor and elderly residents, as well as threats to the historic neighborhood from redevelopment. Chew's connections and involvement in the community through the International Examiner honed his skills in community organizing and advocacy. Chew later served as board president for the newspaper.

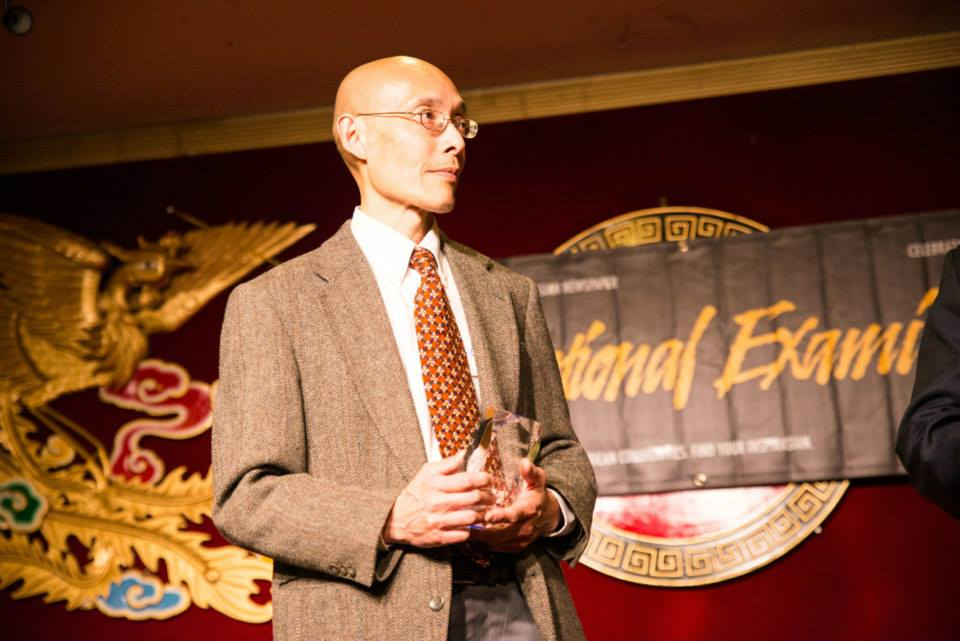
Chew at an International Examiner event

In the late 1980s, Chew began the Chinese Oral History Project, gathering numerous interviews with elderly Chinese Americans. The project became a traveling exhibit and led to his recruitment as the new director for the then-struggling Wing Luke Asian Museum (WLAM) in 1991. Under Chew's leadership, the museum staff developed exhibits collaboratively with community members of diverse backgrounds and created programs and exhibits that addressed and contextualized current issues. This is known as the Community Advisory Committee (CAC) model of exhibit development, in which Chew became a national leader. In 2000, President Bill Clinton appointed Chew and six others as members of the National Council on the Humanities. Chew was recognized for his work as a leader in the museum industry.

In 2004 Chew, along with his staff, board, and community volunteers, undertook a substantial expansion of the Wing Luke Museum by working toward acquiring a historic building in the International District as a permanent home for the museum. A successful $23 million capital campaign enabled the museum to purchase and renovate the East Kong Yick Building as their new home, which opened in 2008. At the conclusion of the campaign, Chew stepped down to pursue a new career as a community history consultant. The museum was renamed the Wing Luke Museum of the Asian Pacific American Experience, colloquially known as The Wing.

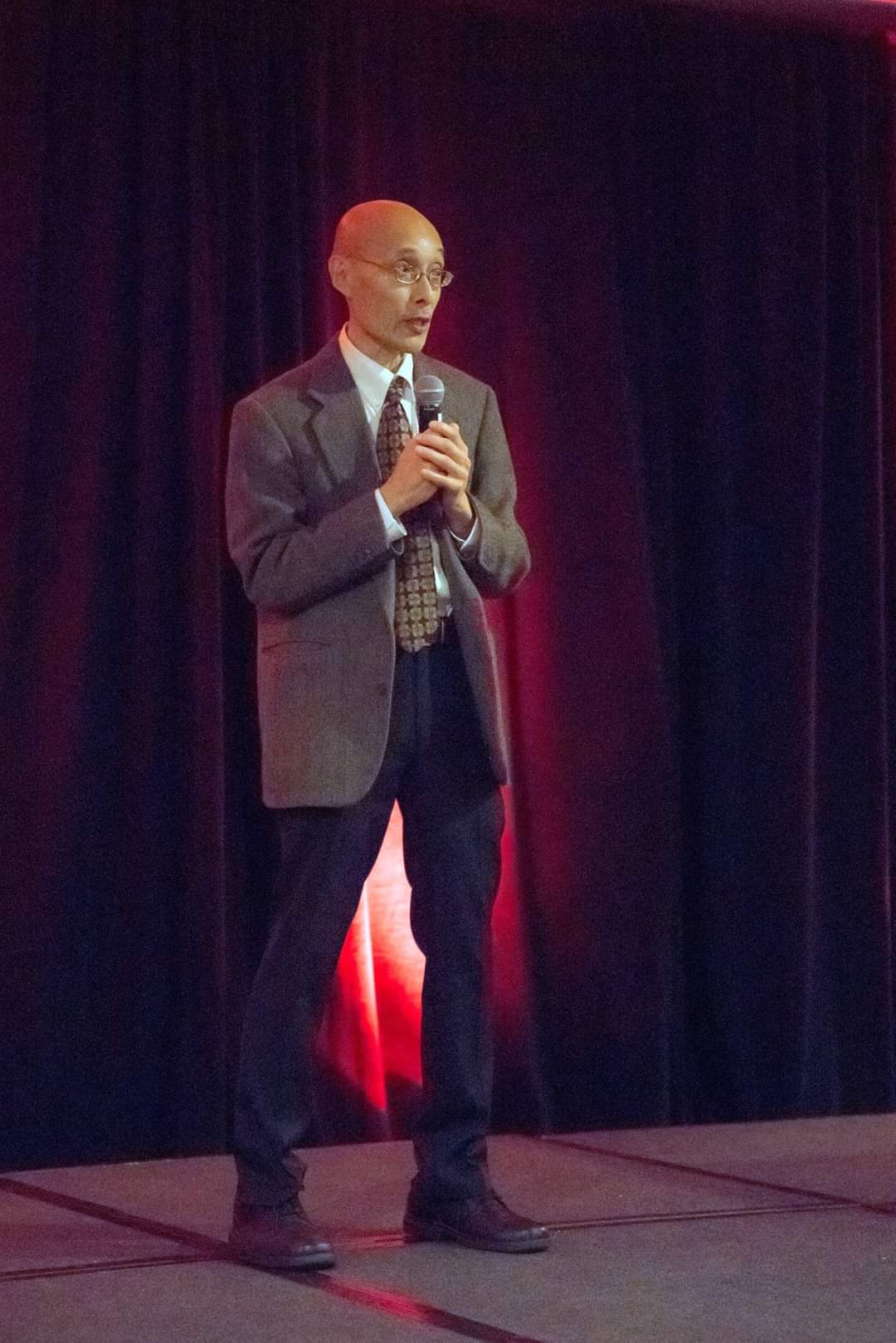
Ron Chew

Since 2008, Chew has owned and operated Chew Communications, a community history and resource development consulting firm in Seattle. From 2008 to 2010, he was scholar in residence in the museology department at the University of Washington.

Chew also served as executive director of the International Community Health Services (ICHS) Foundation in Seattle, a nonprofit which raises funds to promote access to affordable health care in Asian Pacific Islander, refugee, immigrant, and low-income communities. He retired from the ICHS Foundation at the end of 2020. In July of 2024, ICHS announced it would name a new senior care center in his honor, as the Ron Chew Healthy Aging and Wellness Center. The center, for which Chew led the AiPACE Reimagine Aging Capital Campaign during his time as director, is a PACE-model (Program of All-Inclusive Care for the Elderly) collaborative effort involving community organizations ICHS, Kin On Health Care Center, Seattle Chinatown International District Preservation and Development Authority (SCIDpda), and El Centro de la Raza. The Ron Chew Healthy Aging and Wellness Center opened on November 10, 2025. Program participants have access to comprehensive care that can include: primary medical and geriatric care, dental care, vision care, pharmacy services, behavioral health, nutritional counseling, physical therapy, occupational therapy, speech therapy, and assistance with daily tasks and personal hygiene. Services are covered by Medicare and Medicaid. According to State of Washington data, PACE programs save Medicaid $131 per person per month, or more than $2 million annually. A central goal of all-inclusive care is to keep people living independently, at home and in their communities, for as long as possible. In a January 2026 Seattle Times article, Chew stated, "When you take seniors out of the community and institutionalize them, their health deteriorates and they lose their familiar surroundings. But it also strips our community of our elders, our history, our wisdom, our knowledge. So this is a win-win for our community and for the elders and society in general."

In February 2025, Chew was appointed AARP Washington State President. In this role, Chew will collaborate with AARP volunteers and staff, providing long-range planning to help meet the needs of more than 870,000 AARP members and their families in Washington State. At the time of Chew's appointment, adults aged 65 and older made up about 18 percent of Washingtonians. By 2050, this demographic is projected to grow to more than 23 percent, nearly one-quarter of the state's population. Chew stated, "Supporting Washington’s family caregivers is a significant concern at present. Each day, more than 820,000 Washingtonians perform an incredible labor of love—caring for older parents, spouses, and other loved ones, enabling them to stay at home...the financial and emotional tolls of caregiving can be profound. It’s essential that we find ways to support Washington’s caregivers with the resources and connections they require."

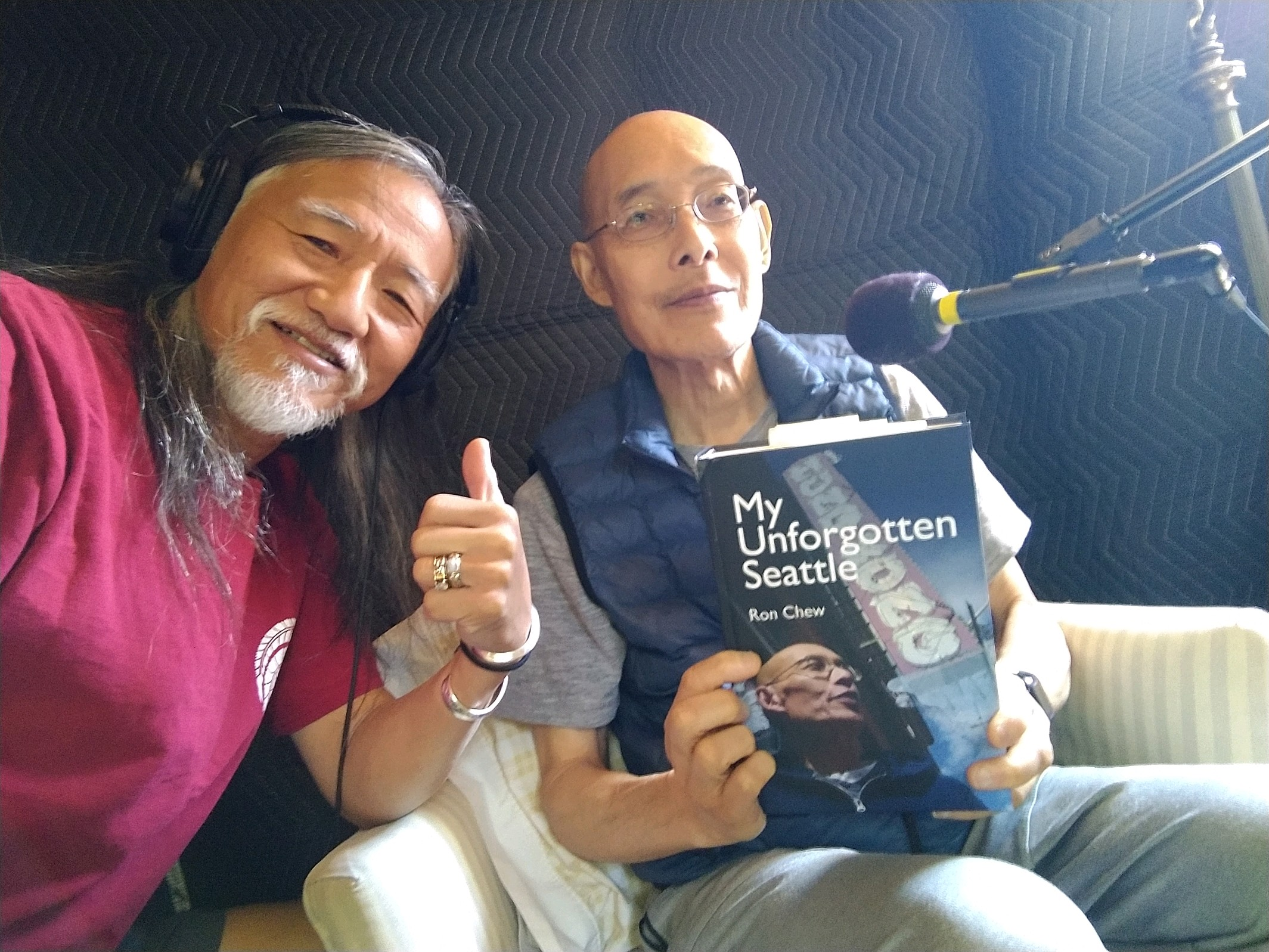
Ron Chew with audiobook producer John Pai

In his free time, Chew is a runner and an avid gardener. He stated in an interview with The Seattle Times that "gardens express ourselves in a very elemental way." Chew built a 120 square foot shed with a loft and electricity in his backyard garden, which doubled as a recording studio for his 2020 memoir with audiobook producer John Pai.

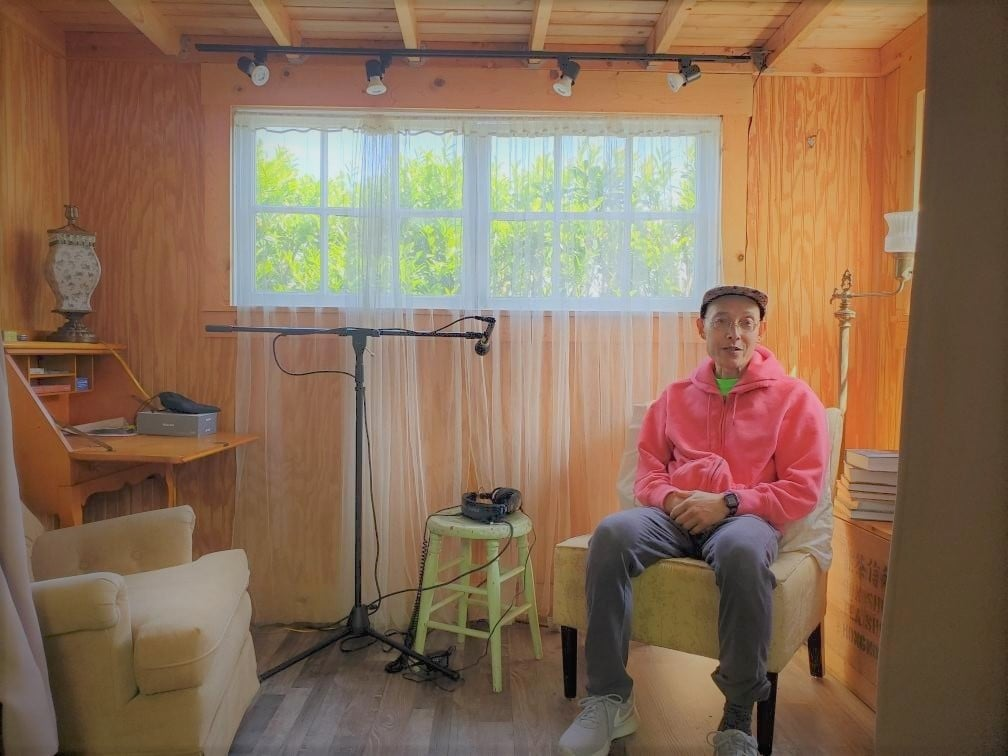
Chew in his audiobook recording studio

== Awards ==
In 2002, the University of Washington recognized Chew's innovative work since leaving college and awarded him an honorary Bachelor of Arts Degree. In 2004, Chew received the Ford Foundation's Leadership for a Changing World Award. In 2005, the American Association of Museums included Chew in their Centennial Honor Roll for his work recasting the museum as a tool in the fight for social justice.

In 2007, Chew and the Wing Luke Museum received the William O. Douglas Award from the ACLU of Washington State for "outstanding contributions showcasing the struggle for civil rights as integral to Asian American history and culture."

In 2021, Chew received two lifetime achievement awards. Dr. Allyson Brooks, the Washington State Historic Preservation Officer (SHPO) and Director of the Washington State Department of Archaeology and Historic Preservation (DAHP), recognized Chew for "career achievement" with an Outstanding Achievement in Historic Preservation Award. The award, signed by Washington State Governor Jay Inslee, highlighted Chew's "commitment to rehabilitating the East Kong Yick Building." Chew was also honored with a Legacy Award from the Association of King County Historical Organizations (AKCHO) for his "lifelong dedication to uplifting Asian heritage through community voices."

Additionally, Chew was the 2021 recipient of the Anne Focke Arts Leadership Award, sponsored by the University of Washington School of Art + Art History + Design. The award recognized Chew's work as a scholar-in-residence at the University.

== Publications ==
Chew's publications include Community-Based Arts Organizations: A New Center of Gravity through Americans for the Arts, which outlines the emerging centrality of arts organizations as change agents in communities. In 2012, he published Remembering Silme Domingo and Gene Viernes: The Legacy of Filipino American Labor Activism. Chew's autobiography, My Unforgotten Seattle, was published in the fall of 2020.

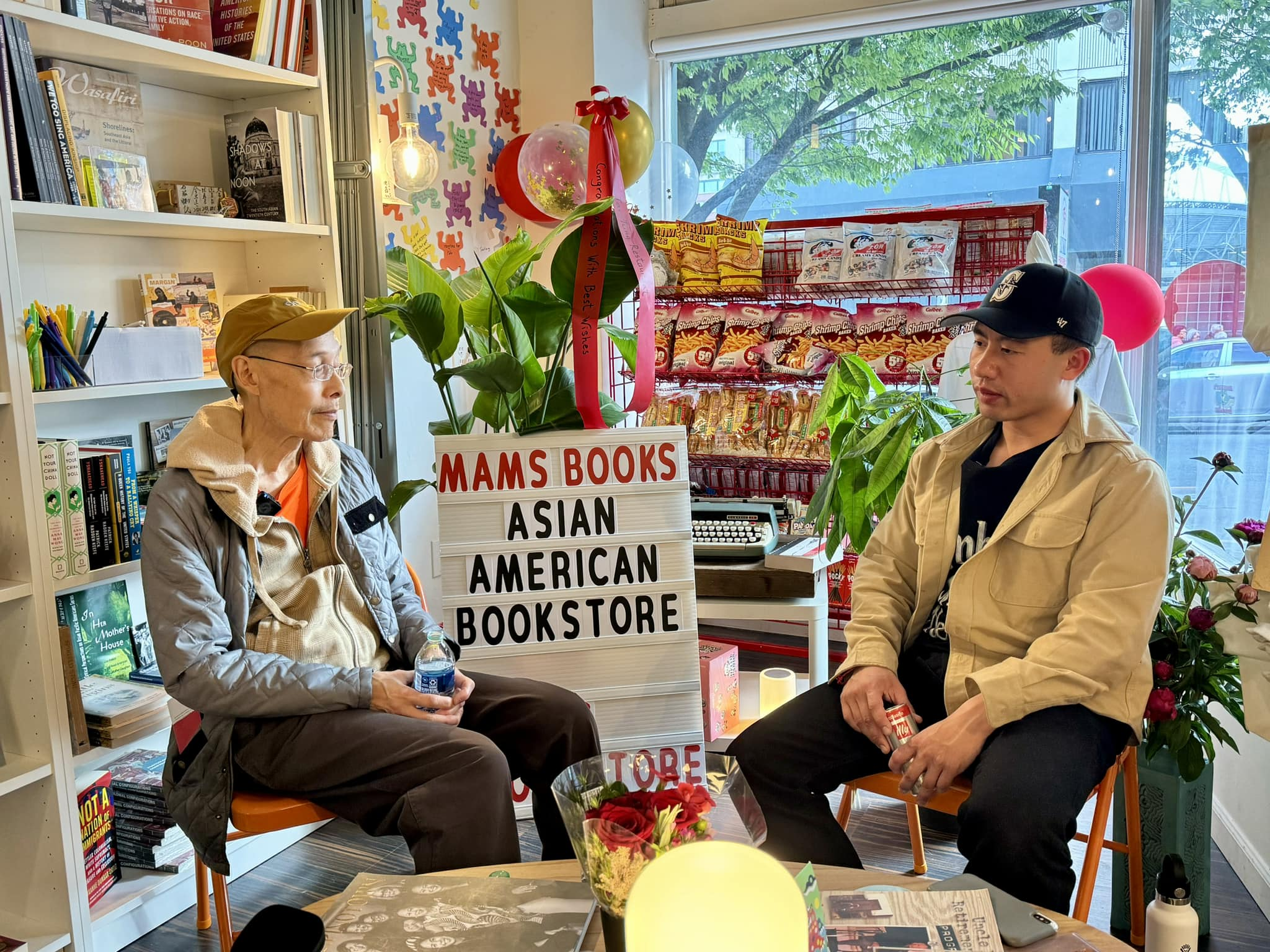
Chew at an AANHPI Heritage Month event at Cambodian American bookstore mam's books in the CID

== Works ==
- — (1994). Reflections of Seattle's Chinese Americans : the first 100 years. Seattle, WA: University of Washington Press: Wing Luke Asian Museum. ISBN 9780295974125. OCLC 30894283, 607705363, 622995841.
- — (2009). Community-Based Arts Organizations: A New Center of Gravity (PDF). Washington, DC: Americans for the Arts. Archived from the original (PDF) on 2010-12-12.
- — (2012). Remembering Silme Domingo and Gene Viernes: the legacy of Filipino American labor activism. Seattle, WA: Alaskero Foundation / University of Washington Press. ISBN 9780295991900. OCLC 768041919.
- — (2020). My Unforgotten Seattle. Seattle, WA: International Examiner. ISBN 978-0295748412. OCLC 1156340234.

== See also ==
- Wing Luke Museum
- Ecomuseum
- Chinatown-International District, Seattle
- International Examiner
- Donnie Chin
- Bob Santos
- Chinese Americans
- History of Chinese Americans in Seattle
