= Seattle Chinese Times =

Bilingual weekly newspaper

- Type: Weekly
- Founder: Deng Rihua
- Founded: May 2004
- Headquarters: Seattle, United States
- Website: seattlechinesetimes.com

The Seattle Chinese Times (traditional Chinese: 西城時報; simplified Chinese: 西城时报; pinyin: Xīchéng shíbào) is a United States-based free bilingual weekly newspaper which was launched its first edition in May 2004 by Deng Rihua (邓日华).

The contents comprise news reports, and editorials concerning the lifestyle and culture of the Chinese/Asian ethnic group in the Greater Puget Sound and Vancouver, British Columbia, Canada in the northwest.

In January 2005, the Seattle Chinese Times introduced a full-color edition, the first full-color weekly newspaper in the Chinese community. That same year saw the introduction of the "Canada Section", featuring events and activities in Canada; restaurants, entertainment, feature articles, and celebrity interviews. In April 2007, the Northwest Edition, Greater Seattle Edition and Metropolitan Edition were launched.

== Profile ==
- Language: Chinese and English
- Size: 11.5 inches (W) × 20.25 inches (H)
- Audience: Chinese/Asian and general community
- Frequency: Weekly, published on Thursday
- Circulation: 520,000+ copies annually
- Distribution: Available at newsstands, restaurants, grocery stores and retail locations

=== Distribution ===
USA – 520,000 copies+ yearly

- Washington
- King County:
- Chinatown-International District, Seattle
- Shoreline, Northgate, Lynnwood, Edmonds (North), Bellevue, Factoria, Redmond (East)
- Renton, Kent, Federal Way (South)
- Pierce County, Tacoma, Vancouver (WA)
- Portland, Oregon

== See also ==
- History of the Chinese Americans in Seattle
