= Donnie Chin =

Seattle Asian American community leader

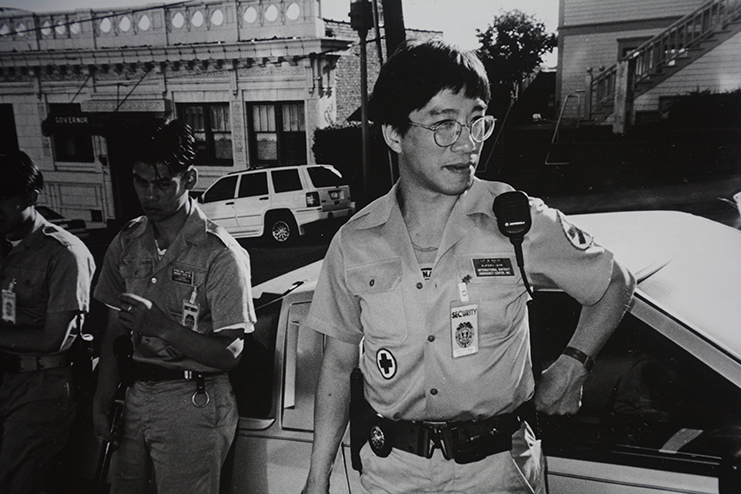
- Born: October 7, 1955; Seattle, Washington, U.S.
- Died: July 23, 2015 (aged 59); Seattle, Washington, U.S.
- Years active: 1967–2015

Donnie Chin
- Chinese: 陈荣新
Transcriptions
Standard Mandarin
- Hanyu Pinyin: Chén Róngxīn
Yue: Cantonese
- Jyutping: can4 wing4 san1

Donald Gregory Chin (October 7, 1955 – July 23, 2015) was an American activist and community leader who founded and operated the International District Emergency Center (IDEC). Chin founded IDEC with childhood friend and photojournalist Dean Wong in 1968, due to slow response times by Seattle police and fire services to emergency calls in the Chinatown-International District (CID). In the early hours of July 23, 2015, Chin was shot and killed during a gun battle between two rival groups. As of 2025, his murder remains unsolved.

== Early life ==
Donald Gregory Chin was born in Seattle on October 7, 1955, as one of three children to Dun Hing "Don" Chin and Myra Chin (née Mar). Don Chin immigrated from Taishan, Guangdong at seven years old. The Chin family operated Sun May Company, a gift shop in Canton Alley in the CID, started by Don Chin's father Shong Chin in 1911. Don Chin helped start the Seattle Chinese Chamber of Commerce in 1963.

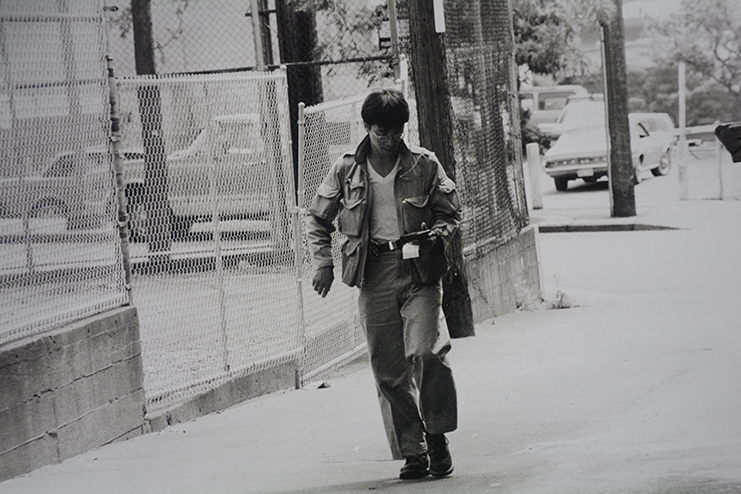
Donnie Chin. Photo by Dean Wong.

Having been radicalized as a student by the Asian American Movement, Donnie Chin teamed up with his friend Dean Wong in 1967 and created Asians for Unity, based after the Black Panther Party. The group patrolled the streets of the CID in an effort to keep the neighborhood safe. This effort became the International District Emergency Center.

== Career ==
In 1968, Chin and Wong founded the International District Emergency Center (IDEC, pronounced I.D.E.C.). IDEC provided a community-led solution to slow emergency response times in Seattle's Chinatown-International District (CID), a historically under-served diverse neighborhood. Chin also identified a significant gap in emergency services: the 9-1-1 phone line did not offer bilingual interpretation at the time. IDEC staffed an English and Chinese language phone line to receive emergency calls. IDEC also maintained collaborative relationships with City and County emergency services. The organization worked with the local fire station, which supported IDEC in turn by providing volunteer labor and financial donations. During this time, Chin continued to attend Garfield High School.

Through IDEC, Chin provided security services and staffed first aid stations at community events, held emergency preparedness trainings, and led a team of volunteer first responders in the CID for decades. Chin also contributed mentorship, first responder training, and free food to local youth. According to his sister Constance Chin-Magorty, “Donnie's real legacy are those kids that he helped raise. There were hundreds of them...he helped take care of. He started this when he was a kid, so he was only a little older, a big brother figure.” Maiko Winkler-Chin, executive director of the Seattle Chinatown International-District Preservation and Development Authority (SCIDpda) reflected, "He provided a much broader sense of public safety that was never just about policing." As Ron Chew, former editor of the International Examiner and executive director of the International Community Health Services Foundation stated, “Donnie Chin was the eyes and ears of the neighborhood."

== Death ==
In the early hours of Thursday, July 23, 2015, Chin was lethally shot. The Seattle Police Department cordoned off the crime scene on 8th Avenue S between S King St and S Lane St. It was later determined that Chin had been killed in a shootout between rival gangs while he was responding to an emergency phone call.

The hashtag #justicefordonnie became a rallying cry on social media and signage in the months following Chin's murder. Many of Chin's family members, friends, and community members expressed frustration at the slow release of information from law enforcement. As of 2025, the murder case remains unsolved.

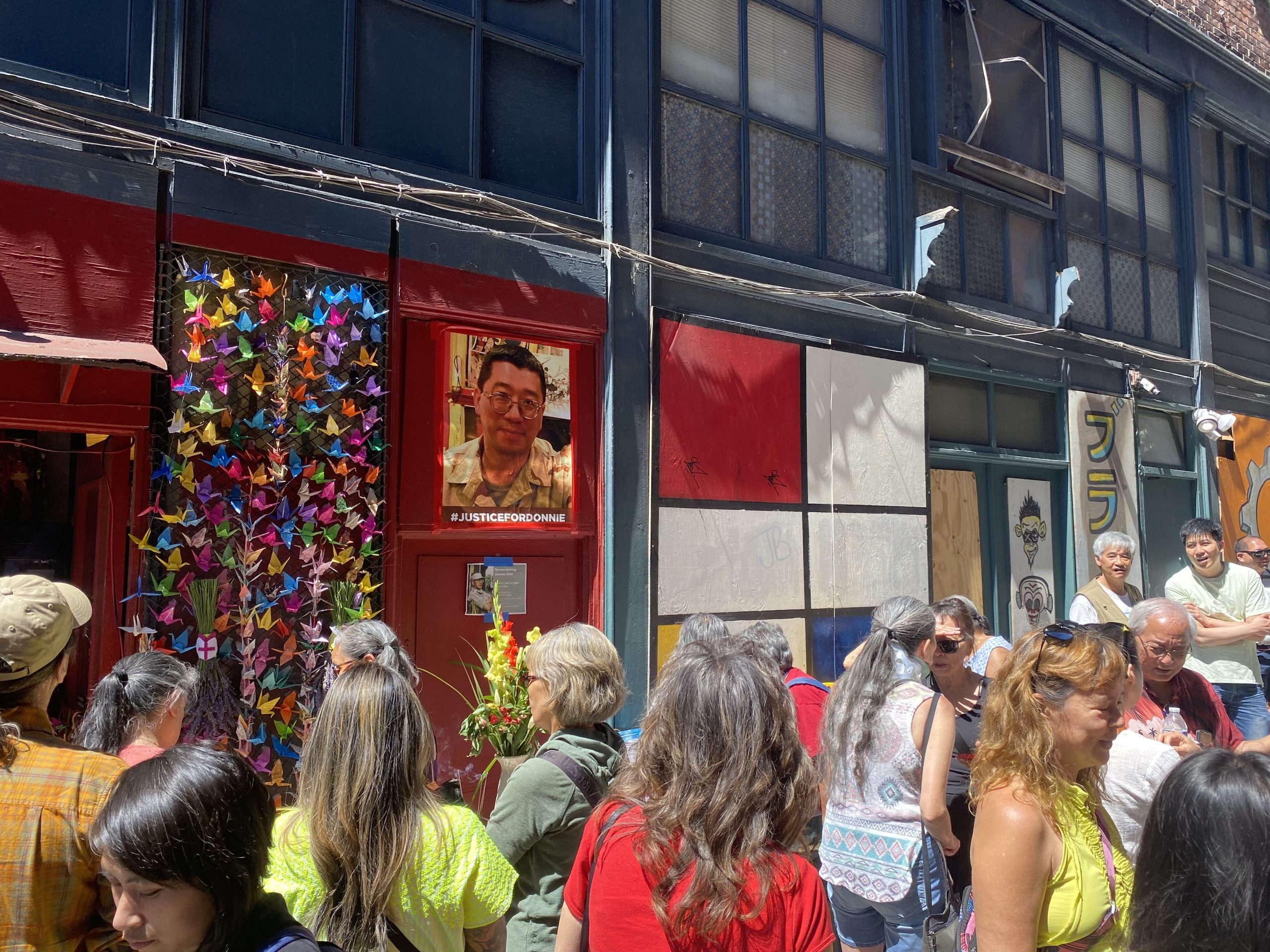
Crowd in Canton Alley. Photo by Indunil Usgoda Arachchi.

Tributes to Donnie Chin in the wake of his murder included a candlelight vigil in Hing Hay Park and a "crossed ladder" salute from the Seattle Fire Department. Community members left flowers and origami cranes at Sun May Company. The Seattle Police Department, Mayor Ed Murray, Governor Jay Inslee, and former King County Executive Ron Sims also issued public statements in tribute to Chin.

== Legacy ==
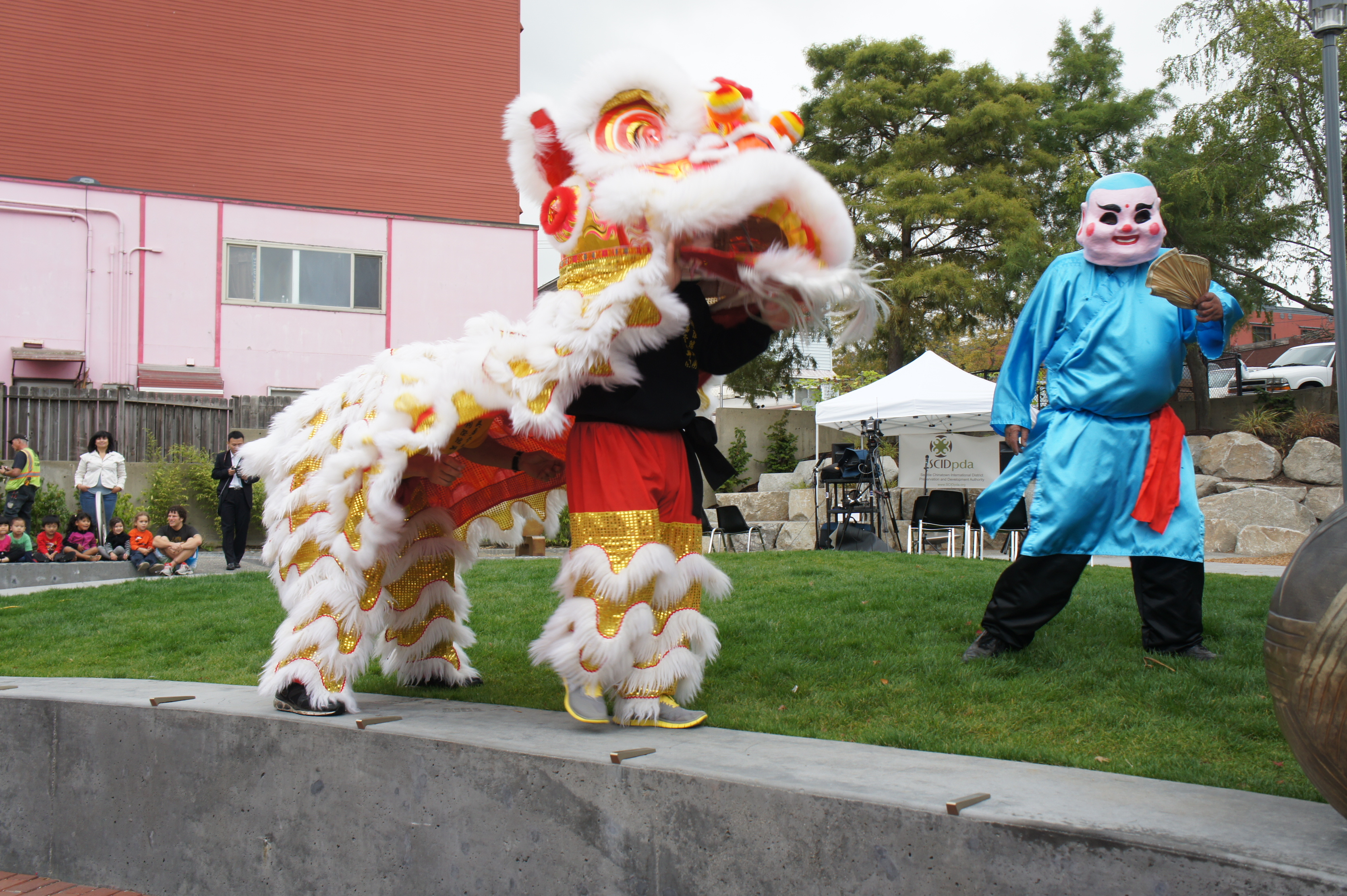
Lion Dance at Donnie Chin International Children's Park

In February 2016, the Organization of Chinese Americans (OCA) in Seattle launched a campaign to rename the International District Children's Park to Donnie Chin International Children's Park. Chin was called "instrumental in the creation of the park", as he had identified the need for a children's park in the CID during the 1970s. City of Seattle Parks and Recreation standard policy requires renaming requests to wait until three years after death. In June 2016, the Seattle City Council voted unanimously to rename the park, making an exception for Donnie Chin.

In May 2019, Chin was posthumously awarded InterIm Community Development Association's Bob Santos Leadership in Sustainability Award. Connie Chin-Magorty, Chin's sister, agreed to accept the award on his behalf because Chin and Santos were very close and she respected InterIm.

Multiple memorials have been held for Chin: a July 23, 2023 memorial at his family's store, the Sun May Co., was the first event held for him after the COVID-19 pandemic.

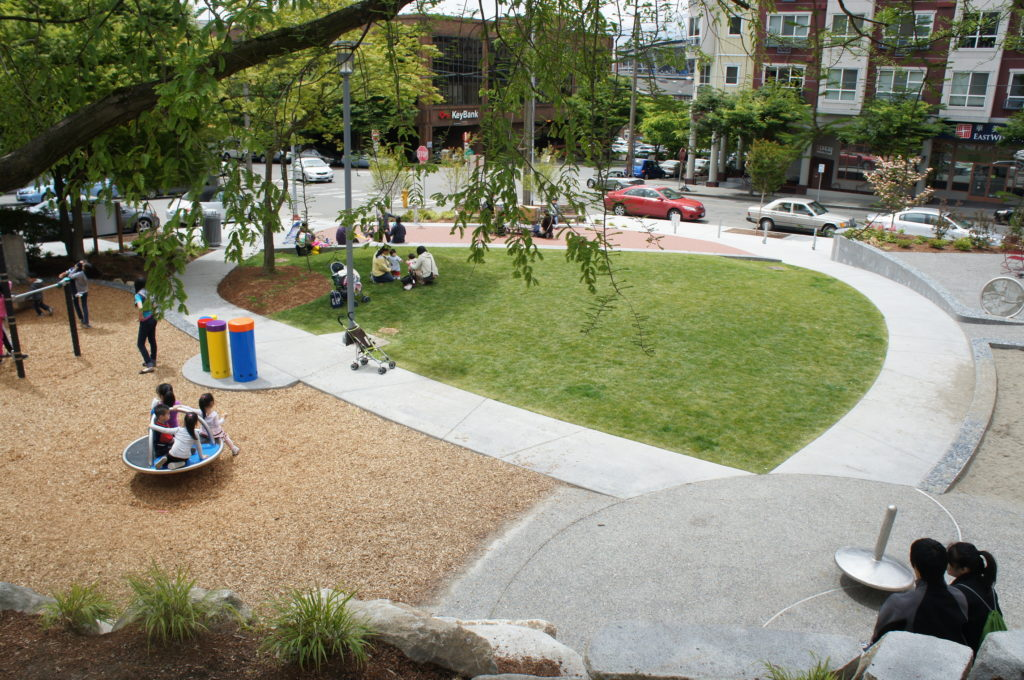
Donnie Chin International Children's Park
