= Canton Alley =

Historic alley in Seattle, Washington, U.S.

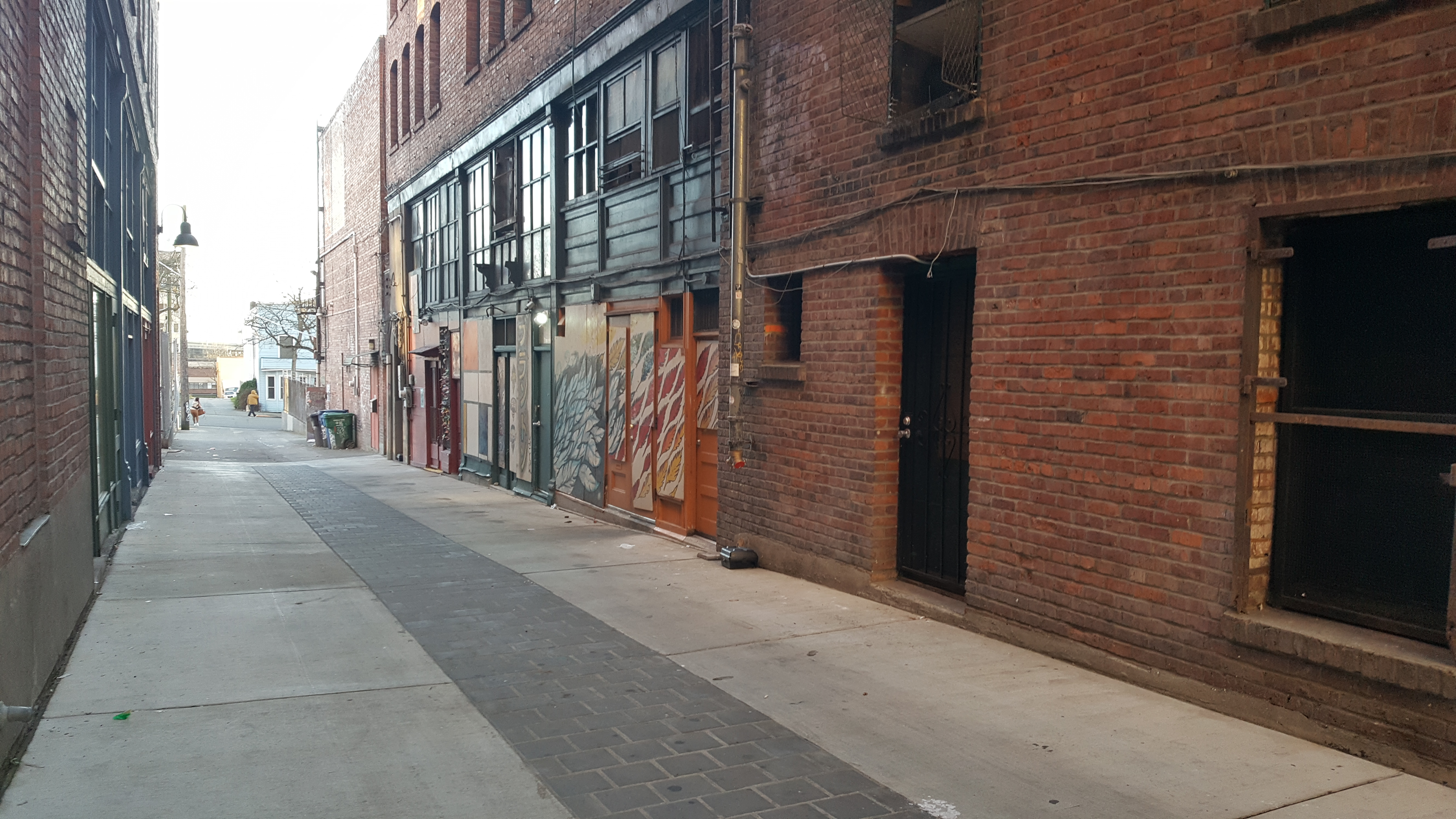
- The alley in 2022

- Location within Washington (state)
- Location: Seattle, Washington, U.S.
- Coordinates: 47°35′53″N 122°19′23″W

Canton Alley (Chinese: 廣州巷) is a historic alley between 7th and 8th Avenues South in Seattle's Chinatown–International District, in the United States. It borders the East Kong Yick Building, which houses the Wing Luke Museum, and has hosted various community events.

== Description and history ==
The Alley dates back to 1910–1912, when the adjacent East Kong Yick Building and West Kong Yick Building were constructed. Canton Alley was once an active neighborhood space with apartments on the upper floors and small shops along both sides. The alley now borders the Wing Luke Museum, a pan-Asian Pacific American community-based museum.

Canton Alley was closed, repaved, and then reopened to the public in 2017 as part of a city reactivation project. It has been the site of has various community events and alley parties.
