= Wing Luke Museum =

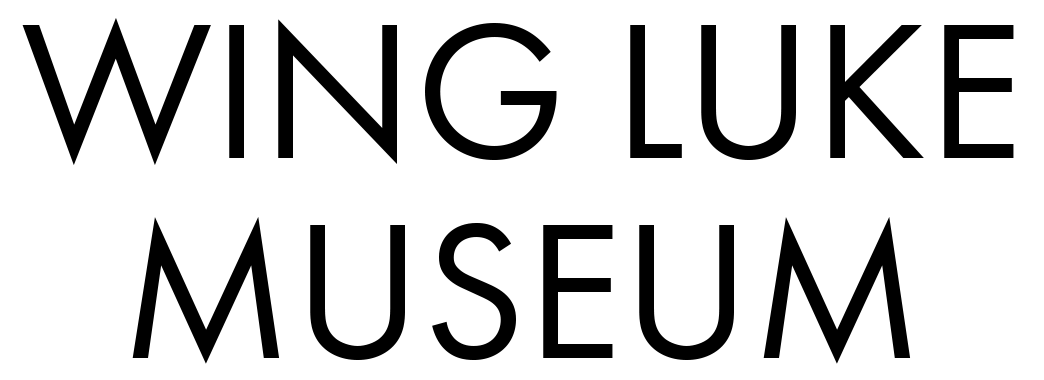

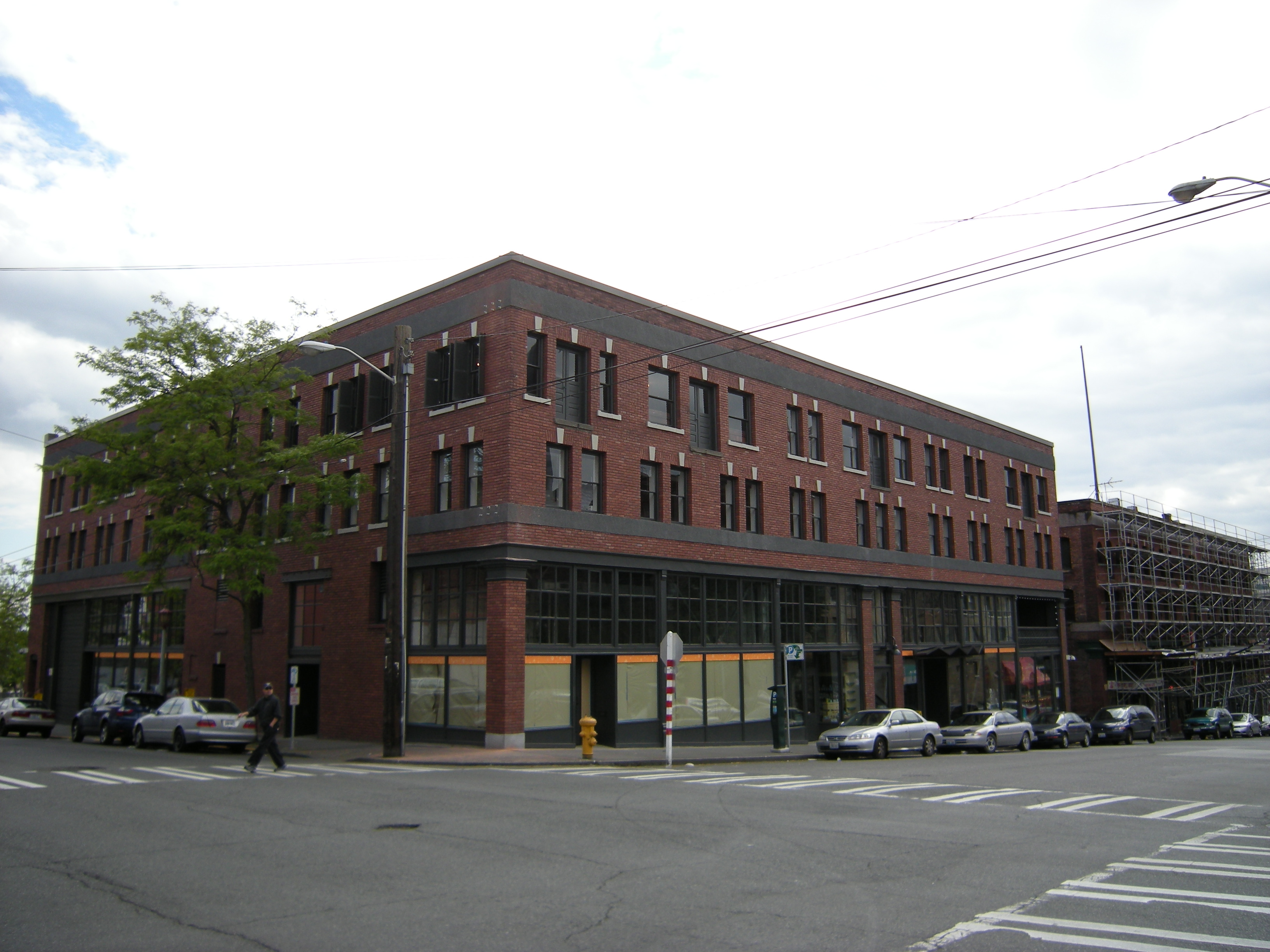
- The East Kong Yick Building, the third and current location of the museum, in 2008
- Former name: Wing Luke Memorial Museum (1967–1987), Wing Luke Asian Museum (1987–2010)
- Established: May 17, 1967
- Location: 719 S King Street; Seattle, Washington, U.S.
- Coordinates: 47°35′54″N 122°19′22″W
- Type: Ethnic history museum
- Presidents: Casey Bui and Ellen Ferguson
- Public transit access: Link light rail (International District/Chinatown), King County Metro, First Hill Streetcar
- Website: wingluke.org

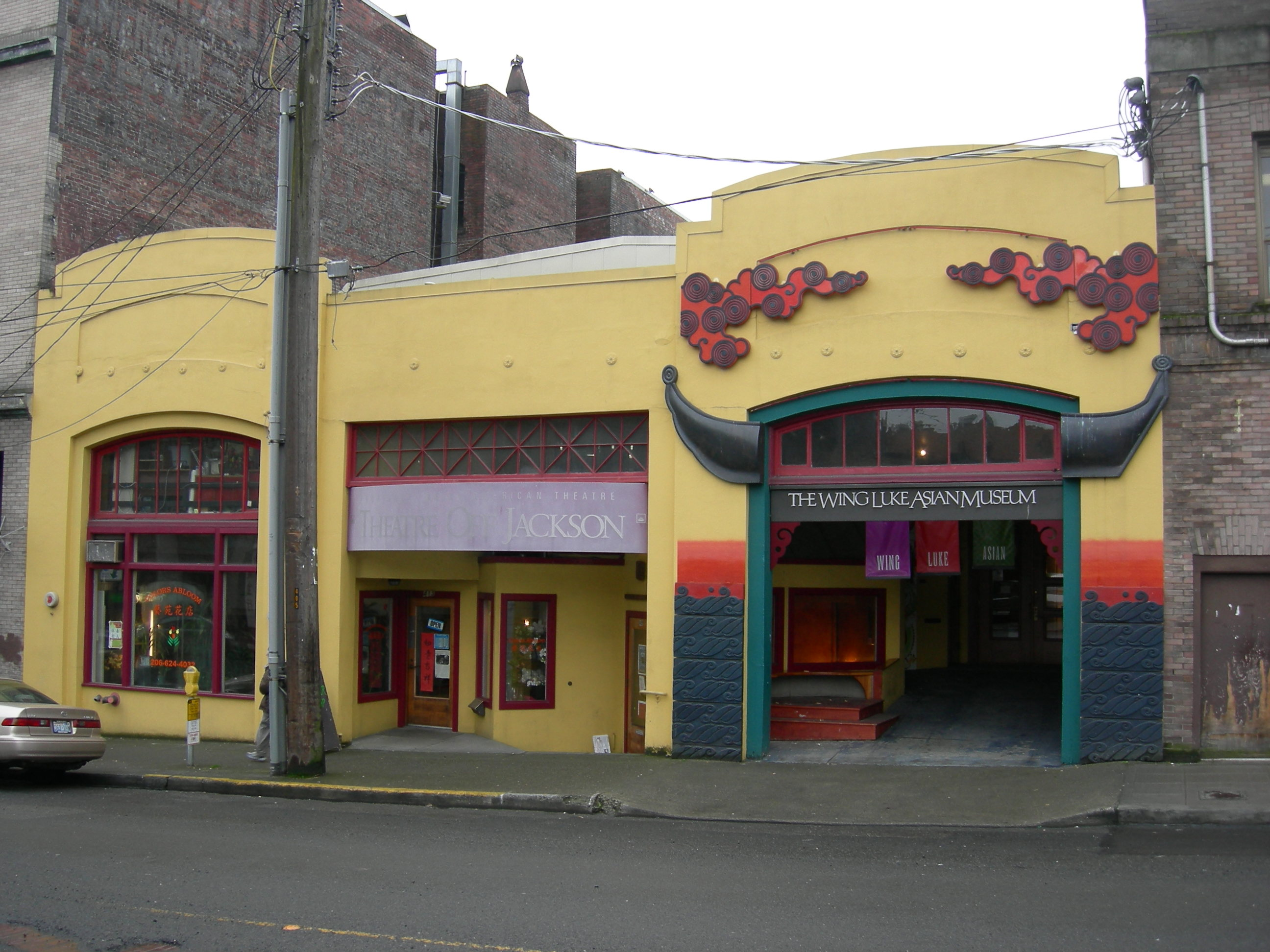
Wing Luke Asian Museum at its second location in 2007; it relocated the following year

The Wing Luke Museum is a museum in Seattle, Washington, United States, which focuses on the culture, art and history of Asian Pacific Americans. It is located in the city's Chinatown-International District. Established in 1967, the museum is a Smithsonian Institution affiliate and the only pan-Asian Pacific American community-based museum in the country. It has relocated twice since its founding, most recently to the East Kong Yick Building in 2008. In February 2013 it was recognized as one of two dozen affiliated areas of the U.S. National Park Service.

== Collections ==
The Wing Luke Museum's collections have over 18,000 items, including artifacts, photographs, documents, books, and oral histories. Parts of the museum's collections are viewable through its online database. There is an oral history lab inside the museum for staff and public use.

== Exhibits ==
The Wing houses temporary and permanent exhibitions related to Asian American history, art, and cultures. The museum represents over 26 ethnic groups.

The museum uses a community-based exhibition model to create exhibits. As part of the community-based process, the museum conducts outreach into communities to find individuals and organizations to partner with. The museum then forms a Community Advisory Committee (CAC) to determine the exhibit's direction. Staff at the museum conduct research, gather materials, and record relevant oral histories under the guidance of the CAC. The CAC also determines the exhibit's overall design and content. This process can take 12 to 18 months.

In 1995, the Wing Luke Museum received the Institute for Museum and Library Services National Award for Museum Service for its exhibit process. Award-winning exhibits by the museum include Do You Know Bruce?, a 2014 exhibit on Bruce Lee. The Association of King County Historical Organizations awarded Do You Know Bruce? the 2015 Exhibit Award.

== History ==
The museum is named for Seattle City Council member Wing Luke, the first Asian American elected to public office in the Pacific Northwest. Luke suggested the need for a museum in the Chinatown-International District in the early 1960s to preserve the history of the rapidly changing neighborhood. After Luke died in a small plane crash in 1965, friends and supporters donated money to start the museum he envisioned. The Wing Luke Memorial Museum, as it was first named, opened in 1967 in a small storefront on 8th Avenue.

Initially, the museum focused on Asian folk art, but soon expanded its programming to reflect the diversity of the local community. The museum exhibited the work of emerging local artists, and by the 1980s pan-Asian exhibits made by community volunteers became central to the museum.

In 1987, the Wing Luke Museum moved to a larger home on 7th Avenue and updated its name to Wing Luke Asian Museum. It achieved national recognition in the 1990s under the direction of local journalist Ron Chew, a pioneer of the community-based model of exhibit development that placed personal experiences at the center of exhibit narratives.

In 2008, the museum moved to a larger building at 719 South King Street, in the renovated 1910 East Kong Yick Building. The Museum continued addressing civil rights and social justice issues, while preserving historic spaces within the building including the former Gee How Oak Tin Association room, the Freeman SRO Hotel, a Canton Alley family apartment, and the Yick Fung Mercantile.

In 2010, the museum changed its name to the Wing Luke Museum of the Asian Pacific American Experience, informally "The Wing".

Nine of the museum's windows along Canton Alley were destroyed on September 14, 2023, in a crime that was described as "racially motivated". In response, the Washington State Department of Commerce and City of Seattle made financial donations to the museum, and the broken windows were replaced with a decorative mural.

In May 2024, around half of the museum's employees walked out to protest a new exhibit titled "Confronting Hate Together", claiming that part of the exhibit "conflate[s] anti-Zionism with antisemitism" and demanding in writing that "We really want the museum to take a pro-Palestinian stance".

== Location ==
=== Building ===
The East Kong Yick Building, where the Museum is located, along with the West Kong Yick Building, were funded by 170 Chinese immigrants in 1910. In addition to storefronts, the East Kong Yick Building contained the Freeman Hotel, which was used by Chinese, Japanese, and Filipino immigrants until the 1940s. The museum's galleries now share the building with re-creations of the Gee How Oak Tin Association's meeting room, kitchens, and apartments that were inside the hotel. The museum also preserves the contents of a general store, Yick Fung Co., which the owner donated in its entirety.

=== Neighborhood ===
The museum is in Seattle's Chinatown-International District next to Canton Alley, historically a residential, commercial, and communal area. The Wing runs Chinatown Discovery Tours, a tour service founded in 1985 that takes visitors to significant sites within the neighborhood.
