= East Kong Yick Building =

Coordinates: 47°35′54″N 122°19′22″W

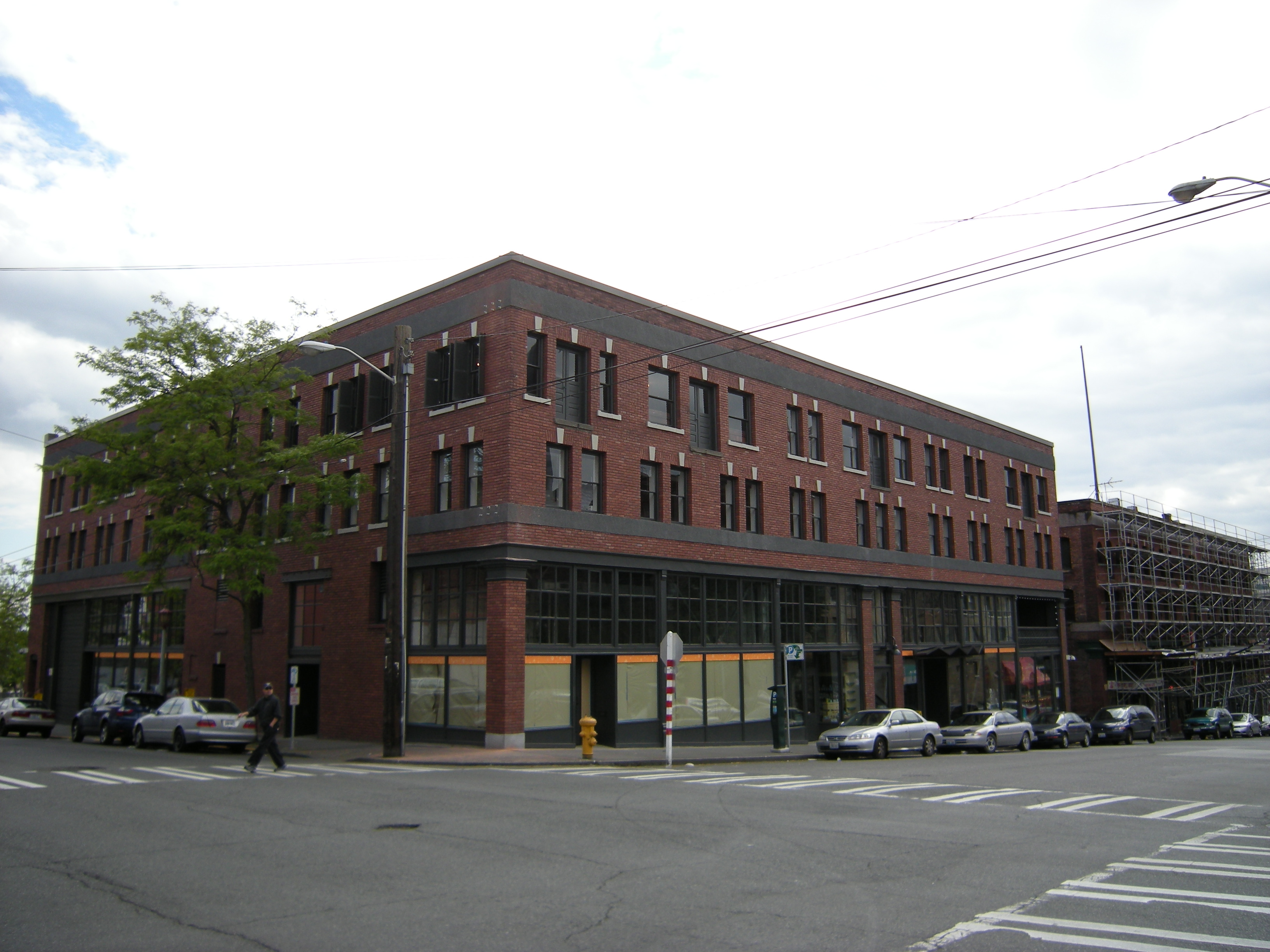
- East Kong Yick Building shortly after re-opening as the Wing Luke Asian Museum, 2008. At right, the West Kong Yick Building is undergoing renovation, hence the scaffolding

General information
- Location: Seattle, Washington

East Kong Yick Building
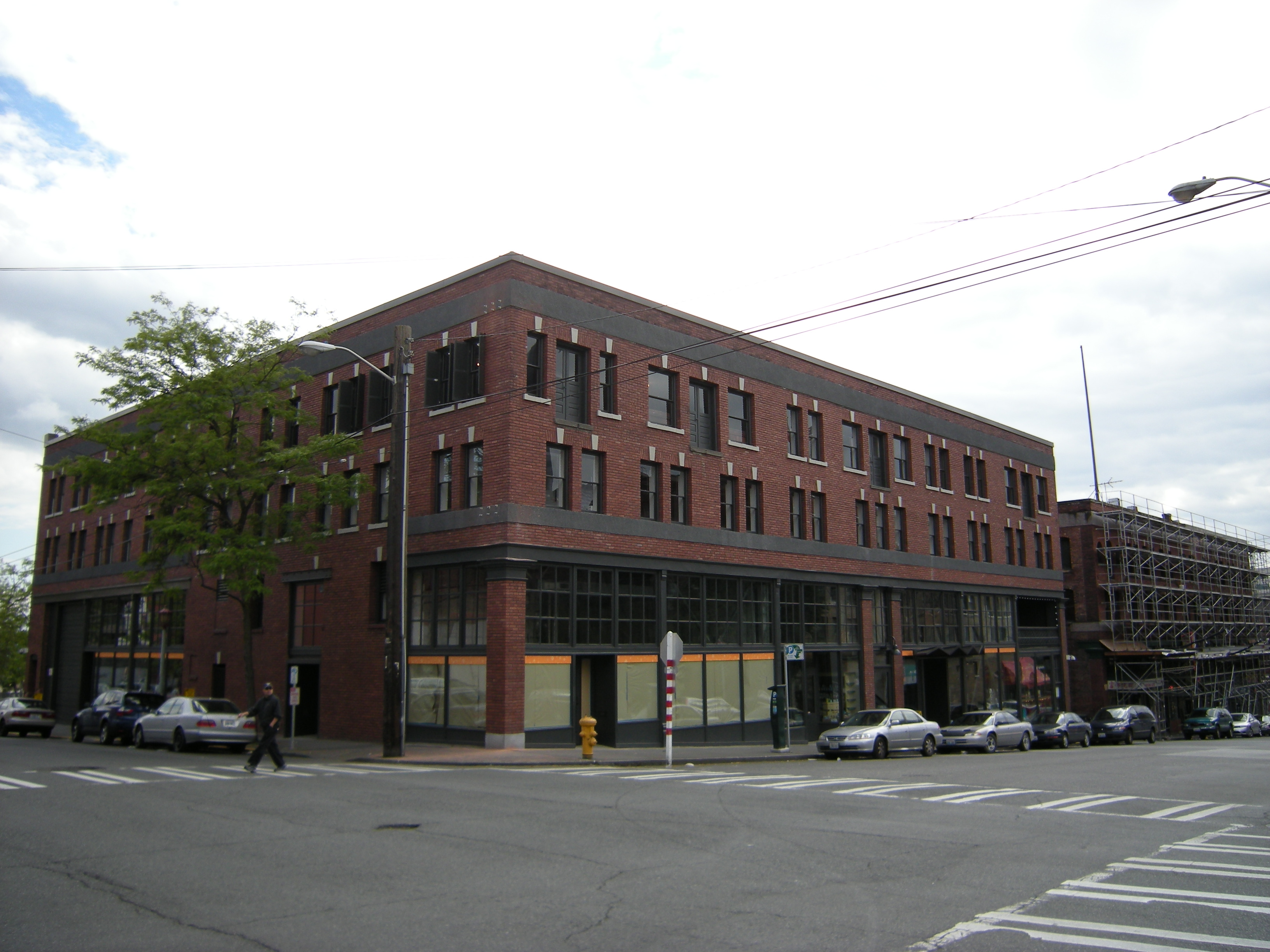
- East Kong Yick Building shortly after re-opening as the Wing Luke Asian Museum, 2008. At right, the West Kong Yick Building is undergoing renovation, hence the scaffolding.
- Traditional Chinese: 東公益大廈
- Simplified Chinese: 东公益大厦
Transcriptions
Standard Mandarin
- Hanyu Pinyin: Dōng Gōng Yì Dàshà
Yue: Cantonese
- Jyutping: Dung^{1} Gung^{1} Jik^{1} Daai^{6}haa^{6}

The East Kong Yick Building (Chinese: 東公益大廈) is one of two buildings erected in Seattle, Washington's Chinatown-International District (ID) by the Kong Yick Investment Company (the other being the West Kong Yick Building). A four-story hotel in the core of the ID, with retail stores at ground level, the East Kong Yick was created by the pooled resources of 170 Chinese American pioneers. In, 2008, the building reopened as the home of the expanded Wing Luke Asian Museum.

== Kong Yick Investment Company ==
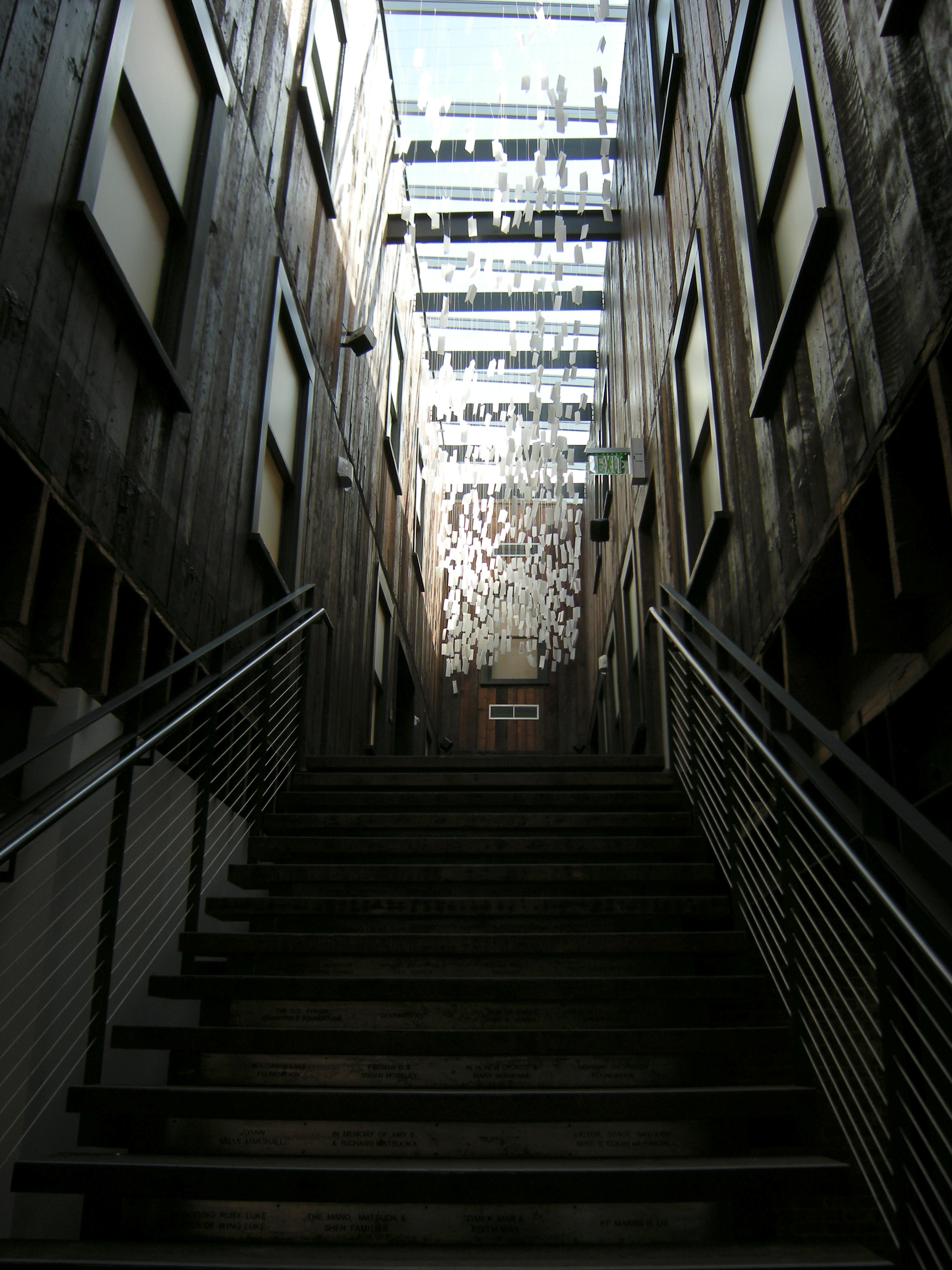
Looking up the main staircase of the museum into a space that was originally an unroofed "light well" between upper sections of the building.

In 1910 Goon Dip, a prominent businessman in Seattle's Chinese American community, led a group of Chinese American pioneers to form the Kong Yick Investment Company. [The name of the company, Kong Yick (公益) loosely means "public benefits."] With no financial backing from a bank, the investment company pooled money from approximately 170 Chinese American community members to fund the construction of two twin buildings that would serve as the anchor of a "new" Chinatown. They commissioned architects Thompson & Thompson, who had strong ties with the local Asian community, to design both buildings.

Members of the investment company lived not only in Seattle but throughout the Pacific Northwest, making the Kong Yick Buildings a landmark for the Chinese community.

== Notable businesses ==
Chin Chun Hock, who arrived in Seattle in 1860, established the Wa Chong Company (華昌, "Chinese Prosperity") in 1868 with partner Woo Gen. The company recruited labor and imported goods from East Asia. When Chinatown relocated to its current location, Wa Chong reopened at 717 King St., now (2010) the Welcome Hall in the new Wing Luke Asian Museum. Next door, Chin Gee Hee operated the Quong Tuck Company, another of the multi-purpose mercantiles selling wholesale and retail import goods, as well as supplying contract labor to canneries, mills and other industrial concerns. Since 2008 the former location of Quong Tuck houses the reconstructed Yick Fung Mercantile exhibit. The Yick Fung Company (益豐號) formerly operated at 705 King St in the West Kong Yick Building from 1910 to 2008.

== Freeman Hotel ==
In addition to the blooming Chinese population, Japanese and Filipino laborers migrated to Seattle in search of work. They found the most affordable and convenient places to stay in Chinatown single room occupancy hotels. The top two floors of the East Kong Yick Building comprised the Freeman Hotel, home to many of these itinerant workers from the canneries, lumber mills, construction sites, farms, restaurants and hand laundries.

== Family associations ==
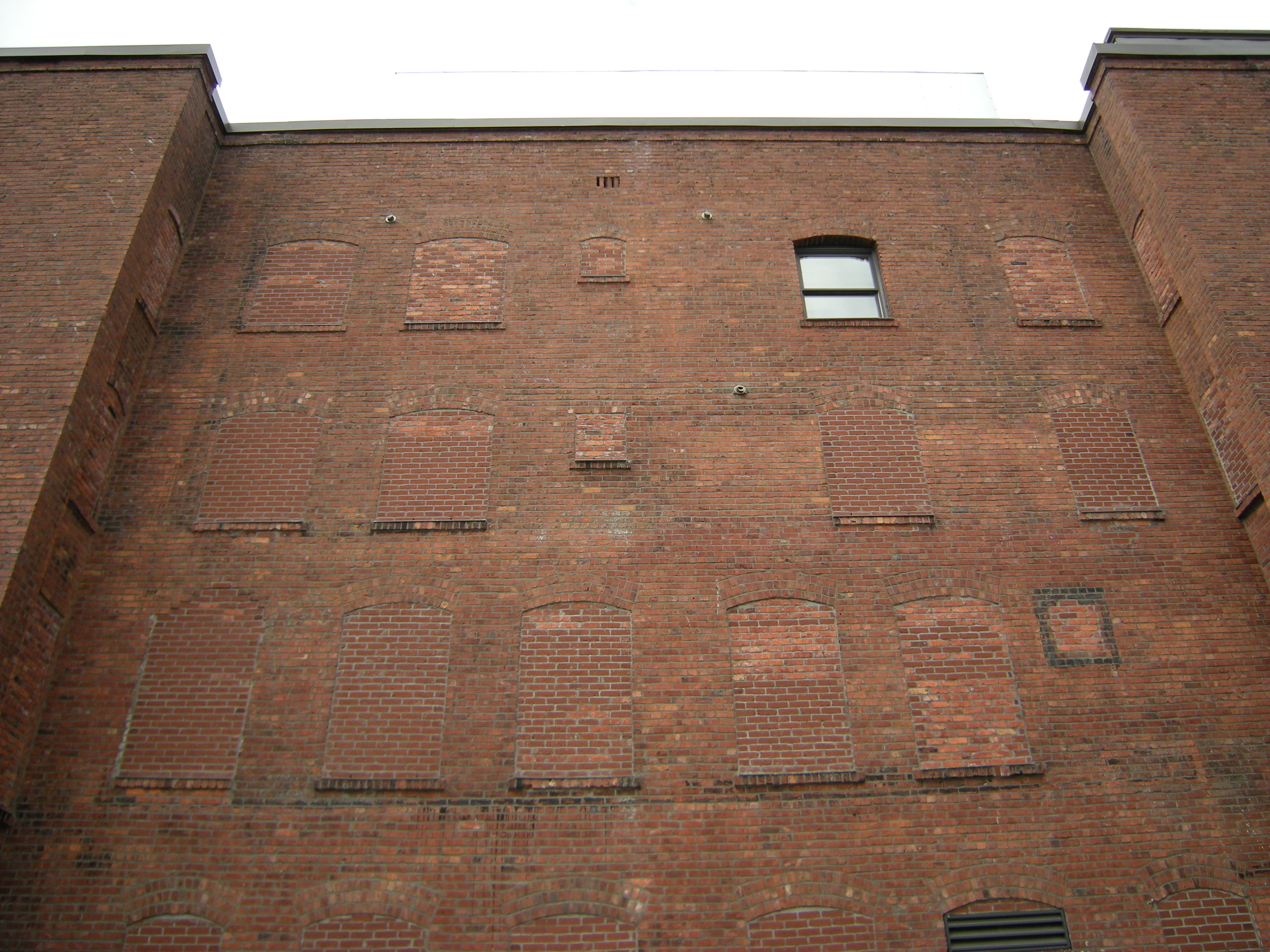
Bricked-over windows on the south façade of the building.

Distinct balconies with elaborate decorations adorned with Chinese characters may be found on the north side of the East Kong Yick. While some of the balconies in the ID mark business fraternities, others signify family associations. These are community organizations based on family surnames that are derived from one's family's "home" village in China. The Kong Yick as well as other buildings in the area housed a number of family associations.

Family associations were the first social "community centers" in Chinatown/ID. The associations were not just social organizations but also provided social services, helping new immigrants adjust to their new lives in America. Many would turn to these family associations to find work, health care and a place to live.

The East Kong Yick Building housed the Gee How Oak Tin family association, the Lee Family Association and others. Since 2008, the former Gee How Oak Tin family association meeting hall is open to the public as an exhibit in the Wing Luke Asian Museum. Additionally, the Luke Family Association maintains meeting space in the museum.

== Family apartments ==
Former storefronts converted to apartments along Canton Alley (between the Kong Yick Buildings) served as home to many families in Chinatown. While outsiders often stigmatized Chinatown alleyways as mysterious and dangerous places, many current and former Chinatown residents recall childhood memories of playing in the alleyways. Some of the apartment units remained occupied until 2005. Since 2008, Canton Alley Apartment #6, restored to its 1950s appearance, serves as an exhibit in the Wing Luke Asian Museum.

== Preserving the immigrant experience ==
In May 2008 the East Kong Yick Building reopened as the new, expanded Wing Luke Asian Museum. Historic apartments, stores and social clubs are preserved as lasting testament to the courage and pioneering spirit of the immigrants. Spaces in the new museum document and share the experience of the thousands of Asians and Pacific Islanders who worked and lived in the United States.

Seattle's Chinatown-International District is the only place in the continental United States where Chinese, Japanese, Filipinos, Vietnamese and other settled together and built one neighborhood. By settling in the East Kong Yick, the Wing Luke Asian Museum hopes to help spur the preservation of other historic buildings in the International District and bring thousands of visitors to support the many neighboring shops and restaurants.
