= Shiro Saigo =

Japanese judoka

Saigō Shirō
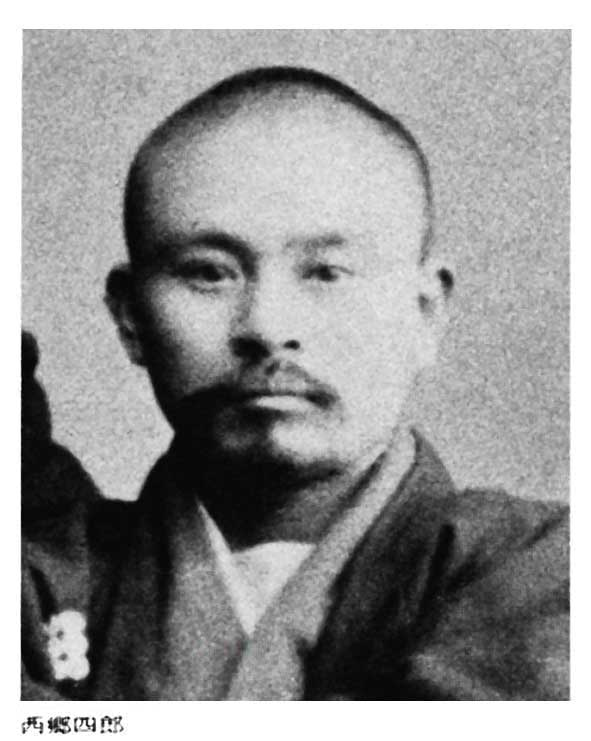
- Born: February 4, 1866; Aizu Wakamatsu, Japan
- Died: December 22, 1922 (aged 56)
- Native name: 西郷四郎
- Nationality: Japanese
- Style: Judo, Daitō-ryū Aiki-jūjutsu
- Teacher: Saigō Tanomo Kanō Jigorō
- Rank: Judo: 6th Dan

Shiro Saigo (西郷四郎, Saigō Shirō; February 4, 1866 – December 22, 1922) was one of the earliest disciples of Judo. Saigo, together with Tsunejiro Tomita, became first in history of judo to be awarded Shodan by the founder of judo Jigoro Kano, who established the kyu-dan ranking system. He was one of the Kōdōkan Shitennō or Four Guardians of the Kodokan along with Yoshitsugu Yamashita, Sakujiro Yokoyama, and Tsunejiro Tomita.

== Biography ==
=== Early life ===
Shiro Saigo was born on Feb 4, 1866 in Aizuwakamatsu, in the Fukushima Prefecture of Japan, the third son of a samurai, Shida Sadajiro. During his childhood, he trained in the fighting style of the Aizu clan, called oshikiuchi.In 1882, Saigo moved to Tokyo and in August of that year, he enrolled at the Kōdōkan, becoming Jigoro Kano's second student. In 1883, along with Tsunejiro Tomita, he became one of the first two to be awarded yudansha rank in any martial art. The very day of their graduation, he would take up the dojoyaburi challenge of Sakujiro Yokoyama, a much heavier jujutsuka, and defeated him, which moved Yokoyama to join the school as well.

A man of extreme agility, Shiro was known for the nickname of "Cat" due to his skill to land on his feet when thrown, a skill he had observed in actual cats and that he trained by jumping off the second floor of a building. He was also known as "Octopus Feet" for his ability to avoid losing his footing. He developed a personal technique called "yama arashi", possibly related to the modern judo technique of the same name, though according to Tsunejiro Tomita it was lost after his death.

=== Judo challenges ===
Saigō was responsible for an early surge of popularity for Kodokan Judo, when he demonstrated its superiority by easily defeating a much larger opponent:

In the years 1885 and 1886, the first foreigners joined the Kami Niban-cho dojo to learn judo. Among them were two American brothers named Eastlake. The elder, weighing some 100 kilograms, was an English language teacher, and the younger, of much slighter build, was a trading house employee. Though Shiro Saigo was far shorter and lighter than the elder Eastlake, Saigo was able to throw the hefty American with considerable ease. Because word quickly spread of his mastery over the big foreigners, Saigo became something of a celebrity. Non-judo people in particular were most impressed at the spectacle of such a small man so easily throwing a much bigger opponent, so much so that Saigo's exploits induced many others to take up training in judo. Thus, thanks to the prowess of our superstar, the number of applicants for Kodokan membership suddenly surged.

Similarly, Saigō fought on behalf of Kodokan in 1884, when three fighters of the Yōshin-ryū jūjutsu school, Matsugoro Okuda, Morikichi Otake and Daihachi Ichikawa, came to challenge their members. As Kano was out at the moment, they only found Shiro and his colleagues Yokoyama and Tsunejiro Tomita, but those decided to answer the challenge by themselves. Shiro defeated Okuda, throwing him down thrice before finishing him out with his yama arashi. Okuda suffered a concussion and had to be stretchered out. Kano was not pleased with their behavior when he found out, thinking they had shown themselves too eager to fight, but anyway their victories helped to increase Kodokan's renown in Japan.

Saigō also took part in the Kodokan-Totsuka rivalry, participating in the tournament between Kōdōkan and the Totsuka branch of Yōshin-ryū hosted by chief inspector Michitsune Mishima. Shiro was sorted to fight Entaro Kochi, a much larger jujutsuka. The size difference was such that it was reported to look like a match between a child and an adult. Controlling the match, Kochi tried to throw him with harai goshi and uchi mata, but Saigō slipped out and landed on his feet every time, making Entaro increasingly tired. Saigō then tried to capitalize on with tomoe nage, which Entaro blocked and tried to come back with an osoto gari with no success. Finally, at around 15 minutes an exhausted Entaro left himself open, and the judoka managed to execute his yama arashi. Although his head hit the ground, Entaro got up again, after which Saigo scored another yama arashi, breaking Kochi's shoulder and forcing him to give up the match. The Kōdōkan won most of the matches that day, and the rival school's master Hidemi Totsuka was forced to praise Saigō, saying to Kano "you really have a wonderful student."

Following this victory, the Governor of Chiba Prefecture Mamoru Funakoshi personally travelled to the Kōdōkan dojo to attend a lecture in judo methods accompanied by the leading men of the Totsuka Yōshin-ryū, among them Hidemi Totsuka and Teisuke Nishimura. After seeing Saigō perform a demonstration of randori, Totsuka increased his praises, stating "the 'genius' word might have been created for someone like Shiro Saigō."

Saigō also fought against Shusaburo Sano, a Totsuka jujutsuka who was supposedly strong enough to bend iron rods with his arms and shatter thick boards with his fists. Sano outweighed Shiro by 30 kg and had trained specifically to counter his yama arashi technique. Indeed, he countered it, throwing Saigō down and pinning him with his weight, but the judoka escaped and applied ude-gatame, making the jujutsuka surrender.

=== Departure from Kodokan ===
In 1890, Saigō was forced to leave the Kōdōkan due to his involvement in a street brawl. According to sources, a drunken Shiro challenged a sumotori named Araumi, knocking him out with a throw. However, after the throw Araumi would have bitten Saigo's leg, which caused a brawl between Shiro's entourage of judoka and Araumi's sumo stable. Saigo also attacked many policemen who attempted to break it up, injuring some of them and even throwing some others into a nearby river, which got him in jail until Kano could get him out. He retired to Nagasaki, devoting the rest of his life to kyūdō. As a sign of pardon, however, Kano conceded him the 6th dan after his death.

The main character in Akira Kurosawa's 1943 directorial debut, Sugata Sanshirō, was based on Shiro Saigo, the film being based on the novel of the same name written by Tsunejiro Tomita's son, Tsuneo.

== Bibliography ==
- Kano, Jigoro (2008), Watson, Brian N. (ed.), Judo Memoirs of Jigoro Kano, Victoria, BC: Trafford Publishing
- Linhart, Sepp; Fruhstuck, Sabine (June 1998). The Culture of Japan As Seen Through Its Leisure. State University of New York Press. p. 85. ISBN 0-7914-3791-4.
- Stevens, John; Shirata, Rinjiro (1983), Aikido, the way of harmony, Boulder, Colorado: Shambhala Publications, Inc.
- Takahashi, Masao (2005), Mastering Judo, Champaign, Illinois: Human Kinetics
