= Seattle Dojo =

Judo club

Exterior of the dojo, 1999

The Seattle Dojo is located at 1510 S. Washington in the Squire Park neighborhood of Seattle, Washington. It is the oldest judo dojo in the continental United States, having been founded sometime before 1907 in what is today the International District.

== Establishment of the Seattle Dojo ==
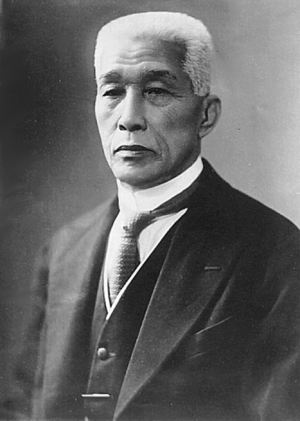
Yoshitsugu Yamashita

On October 17, 1903, a Kodokan leader named Yoshitsugu Yamashita gave demonstrations of judo at the Seattle Theatre. Witnesses included prominent local businessmen and journalists. This success inspired Seattle's Japanese immigrant community to organize its own judo dojo. The pioneer of the Seattle Dojo, previously misidentified as another Japanese immigrant, 25-year-old Iitaru Kano who arrived in Seattle in 1903, was in reality Itaro Kono, a Kodokan 2-Dan judo black belt who arrived in Seattle, also at the age of 25, on November 29, 1905, as a declared "Judo Teacher" aboard the Japanese cargo steamship Iyo-Maru. He remained in Seattle until at least September 18, 1909, when he participated in a judo demonstration for the Alaska-Yukon-Pacific Exposition. During the 1910s, Kono also started judo clubs in Spokane and Chicago. Later, Itaro Kono joined the Royal Mikado Troupe, a traveling performance act with the Barnum & Bailey Circus that demonstrated Japanese martial arts to American audiences across the country. Kono died of cancer in Williamsport, Pennsylvania, the present-day home of the Little League World Series, on August 29, 1914, at the age of 34. He was buried in an unmarked grave in the 'Poor Ground' section of Wildwood Cemetery in Williamsport, Pennsylvania on September 4, 1914.

Tokugoro Ito. The image appeared in the Seattle Post-Intelligencer on November 6, 1909.

The man who made Seattle Dojo famous, however, was professional wrestler Tokugoro Ito, who made the club his headquarters during his stay in Seattle (1907–1911). Other wrestlers associated with Seattle Dojo included Eitaro Suzuki, who wrestled for Japan during the 1932 Olympics, and Kaimon Kudo, a popular professional wrestler of the 1930s and 1940s.

== Location of the Seattle Dojo ==
Until 1934, the Seattle Dojo was located in the basements of various Japantown hotels. The current structure was built during the spring of 1934. Its architect was Kichio Allen Arai, whose better known designs include the Seattle Betsuin Buddhist Temple, Nichiren Buddhist Church, the Yakima Buddhist Church, the Idaho-Oregon Buddhist Temple, and the White River Buddhist Temple.

The building is of frame construction, and its only unusual feature is that its floor is mounted on truck springs, thereby literally giving it spring.

== Tournaments before World War II ==
Seattle Dojo held its first regional tournament in March 1907, and for decades after, it generally hosted at least one major regional tournament per year. From 1909 through 1941, the usual venue for these tournaments was Seattle's Nippon Kan Theatre.

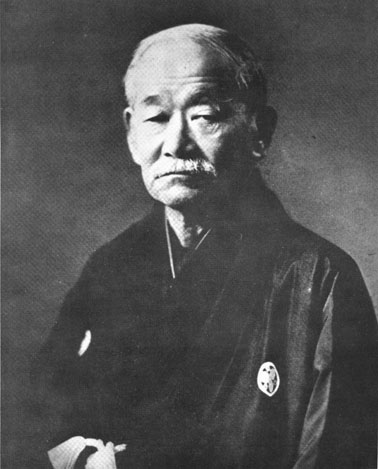
Jigoro Kano was the founder of judo.

Washington State judo teams participated in major interstate tournaments against California judo teams in 1936, 1937, and 1939. The 1937 contest was held at the Seattle Chamber of Commerce's hall, because Nippon Kan wasn't big enough. The other two tournaments took place in Los Angeles. Judo founder Jigoro Kano was present at the 1936 Los Angeles tournament.

== Seattle Dojo after World War II ==
Due to wartime curfews, the Seattle Dojo closed following the Japanese attack on Pearl Harbor in December 1941, and due to the Japanese American internment, it did not reopen for training until January 1, 1947. Men involved in reopening Seattle Dojo after World War II included Toru Araki, Akira "Poison" Kato, Hiromu "Kelly" Nishitani, and Dick Yamasaki.

The club's first post-war tournament took place on April 26, 1953. The Nippon Kan Theatre did not reopen following the forcible relocation of Seattle's Japanese Americans, so the venue was instead the Nisei Veterans Memorial Clubhouse. This 1953 tournament is notable as the first Pacific Northwest tournament in which women participated. Five women were involved, three from a club in Portland, Oregon, and two from a club in Vancouver, British Columbia.

During the early 1950s, Seattle Dojo had a very strong adult team, and during May 1954, a Seattle Dojo team that included Kenji Yamada, Shuzo "Chris" Kato, Charles Woo, Tats Kojima, and George Wilson took first place during the US National AAU judo championships.

== Instructors and students ==
Instructors associated with Seattle Dojo over the years include Iitaro Kono (or Kano), Tokugoro Ito, R. Fukuda, Daisuke Sakai, Eitaro Suzuki, Masataro Shibata, Hideo Hama, Hiroshi Kurosaka, Yasuyuki Kumagai, Isamu "Sam" Furuta, Shuzo "Chris" Kato, Fred Sato, and Kenji Yamada. Chuji Sakata, who taught at Tentokukan during the 1930s, was another important Seattle-area judo teacher.

Well-known former students include professional wrestler Kaimon Kudo, Southern California judo leader Ken Kuniyuki, respected competitor and instructor Masato Tamura, martial art historian Robert W. Smith and Japanese American Citizens League pioneer James Y. Sakamoto.

== Prominent visitors ==
Prominent visitors to Seattle Dojo before World War II include Tsunejiro Tomita in 1910, Hideichi (Hidekazu) Nagaoka in 1934, and Jigoro Kano in 1932 and 1938.

== Associated judo clubs ==
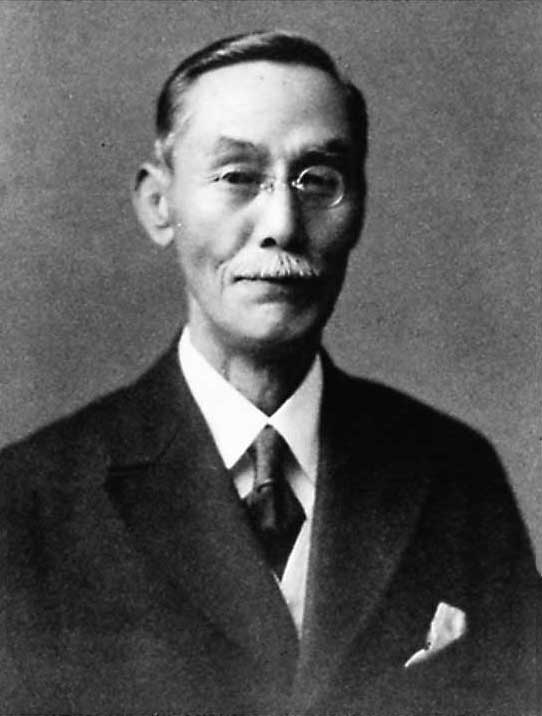
Tsunejiro Tomita was Jigoro Kano's first student.

In 1917, the Tacoma Dojo was established in a building owned by the St. Paul and Tacoma lumber mill. The mill's instructors moved their club to Tacoma's Japantown in 1921, after the mill management decided it needed the space in which the men had been training. Professional wrestler Setsuzo Ota was associated with the Tacoma Dojo in those days, as was his cousin Kohei Yoshida. Both Ota and Yoshida were later active in judo in Southern California.

Another club associated with the St. Paul and Tacoma Dojo was established in the nearby farming community of Fife in 1923. A third Tacoma-area club, Eatonville, was organized in 1938. The Eatonville club was a direct offshoot of the Fife Dojo.

The three Tacoma-area clubs were not directly associated with Seattle Dojo, but their members often participated in its annual tournaments.

Although the Tacoma-Fife clubs reorganized as a single organization in 1952, the descendent club disbanded following the death of the club's longtime teacher, Ryoichi Iwakiri, in 1987. Consequently, there is no direct descendant of any of these clubs active today. Masato Tamura of Chicago, and his brother Vince Tamura, both well known judo men of the 1950s, were originally from Fife.

Until 1923, Seattle Dojo, Tacoma Dojo, and Fife Dojo were the only Japanese American judo clubs in Washington State. The distinction is made because there were also some gyms at which judo (or jujutsu) methods were taught to non-Japanese by other non-Japanese. A prominent example would be the instruction offered by the Seattle policeman S.J. Jorgensen. Then, starting in 1924, additional Japanese American clubs were established. The reason was the increasing number of Nisei (second-generation) youth. Judo clubs directly associated with Seattle Dojo were South Park (est. 1924), White River (Thomas, near Auburn; est. 1927), Green Lake (est. 1932), Bainbridge Island (est. 1932), and Yakima Valley (in Wapato, est. 1935). None of these second-generation clubs reorganized following World War II.

Meanwhile, antagonisms within Seattle's Japanese American community caused divisions within the Seattle Dojo, and the subsequent establishment of a rival Seattle-based judo club called Tentokukan (est. 1928). Judo clubs directly associated with Tentokukan were located in O'Brien (near Kent; est. 1929), Sunnydale (in Burien; est. 1932), Bellevue (est. 1932), and Spokane (est. 1937). Of these clubs, only the Spokane club (Seiki-kan) reorganized following World War II. E.K. Koiwai, a leader of judo in Pennsylvania during the 1950s and 1960s, was a former member of Tentokukan, as was Ken Kuniyuki, a leader of judo in California for many decades.

There was also a judo club in Ontario, Oregon (est. 1939) that was essentially a spin-off of the White River Dojo. This club's postwar descendant is located in nearby Nampa, Idaho; Ontario's current Ore-Ida Judo Dojo was established in January 1950 by Japanese Americans from across Washington and Oregon.

== See also ==
- History of the Japanese in Seattle
- Judo in the United States
