= Aikido and the Dynamic Sphere =

1970 book by Adele Westbrook and Oscar Ratti

Aikido and the Dynamic Sphere: An Illustrated Introduction
- Author: Adele Westbrook, Oscar Ratti
- Illustrator: Oscar Ratti
- Subject: Aikido
- Publisher: Charles E. Tuttle Company
- Publication date: 1970
- Pages: 375
- ISBN: 978-0-8048-0004-4
- Dewey Decimal: 796.8154
- LC Class: GV

Aikido and the Dynamic Sphere is a 1970 nonfiction book about the martial art of aikido.

Oscar Ratti and Adele Westbrook, husband and wife, wrote Aikido and the Dynamic Sphere shortly after they had achieved shodan rank in aikido, and a short stay in Japan. It is based largely on the teachings of Yasuo Ohara, founder of the New York Aikikai.

The book has been praised for Ratti's many illustrations (over 1200); although it has been noted that they do not provide sufficient information for the purposes of instruction. The authors' system of numbering techniques and attacks (rather than using the Japanese terms, which can differ between styles) has been praised for its ingenuity in unifying aikido terminology.

Westbrook's text focuses heavily on the moral aspect of aikido, dividing violent encounters into four ethical levels:

1. Unprovoked attack, in which the victim is assaulted without warning or reason.
2. Provoked attack, in which the victim insults or otherwise encourages the attacker to act.
3. Subjective self-defence, in which the defender fights back with the intent of harming the attacker.
4. Ethical self-defence, in which neither defender nor attacker are harmed.

Another goal of the book is to explain the supposedly esoteric concept of ki in Western terms. Westbrook defines it as a "unity of mind and body - the fusion of... direction and action".

The text has received criticism both for its emphasis and simplification yet it remains notable in that it was one of the first texts written by Western aikido practitioners to address these issues. It is a standard found in most aikido libraries, remaining in print and translated into many languages.
