= Tomita Tsunejirō =

Japanese judoka

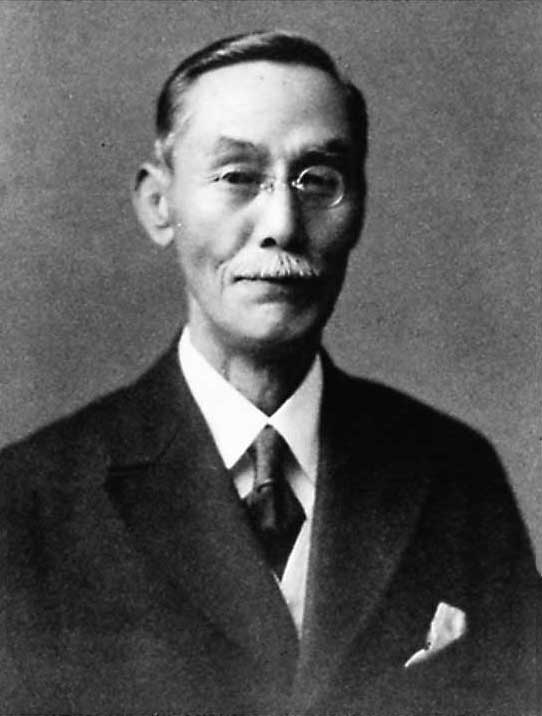
- Tomita Tsunejirō, the Guardian of the Kōdōkan.
- Born: Yamada Tsunejirō; February 28, 1865; Numazu, Shizuoka, Japan
- Died: January 13, 1937 (aged 71)
- Native name: 富田 常次郎
- Nationality: Japan
- Style: Judo, Jujutsu
- Teacher: Kanō Jigorō
- Rank: Judo: 7th Dan

Other information
- Notable students: Mitsuyo Maeda

Tomita Tsunejirō (富田 常次郎; February 28, 1865 – January 13, 1937), born Yamada Tsunejirō (山田 常次郎), was the earliest disciple of judo. His name appears in the first line of the enrollment book of the Kōdōkan. Tomita, together with Saigō Shirō, became the first in the history of judo to be awarded the rank of Shodan by the founder of judo, Kanō Jigorō, who established the ranking system that is now commonly used in various martial arts around the world. Tomita was known as one of the "Four Kings" of Kōdōkan judo for his victorious efforts in competing against jujitsu schools. He was awarded 7th dan upon his death on January 13, 1937.

== Early life ==
As the earliest student at the Kodokan, Tomita was known as Tsunejiro Yamada. He was adopted by a family named Tomita and his name was therefore changed. He entered the Kodokan in June 1882 as an uchi deshi or live-in student at the recommendation of Jigoro Kano's father. He became Kano's usual training partner. Although he was the least physically gifted of Kano's earlier students, he was dedicated and strong-willed.

Tomita had his first match on behalf of Kodokan in 1884, when Tomita was challenged by Hansuke Nakamura of Ryoi Shinto-ryu during a Tenjin Shinyo-ryu dojo opening in which they were both guests. A police instructor and a man of large size, Nakamura was nicknamed the "Demon Slayer" and considered the toughest man in Japan. As he was much heavier and more experienced than Tomita, Nakamura dared him to fight, believing himself to be superior. However, as soon as the match started, Tomita immediately scored a tomoe nage, and he repeated the technique two more times before his still shocked opponent managed to block it. Nakamura further blocked an ouchi gari and attempted to counterattack, but then Tomita performed a hiza guruma and locked a juji-jime on the ground, making Nakamura pass out. Tomita was hailed by the spectators and heralded as a hero due to his victory.

== Four Guardians of the Kōdōkan ==
When Kanō Jigorō began to develop judo from jujutsu, his efforts met with opposition from jujutsu practitioners. However, Kano drew a loyal following that included exceptional fighters. Hence the term "Four Guardians of the Kōdōkan" came into existence referring to Tsunejiro Tomita along with Yamashita Yoshitsugu, Yokoyama Sakujiro, and Saigō Shirō.

== Introducing judo to the West ==
=== Arrival to the United States ===
Inspired by Yamashita Yoshitsugu's success in the United States (Yamashita taught judo to President Theodore Roosevelt, among others), the 39-year-old Tomita decided to move to New York City. Like Yamashita, Tomita brought a young assistant with him as an exhibition partner. The young man was Maeda Mitsuyo, 26-year-old judoka who later became fundamental to the development of Brazilian jiu-jitsu. Tomita, Maeda, and Soshihiro Satake arrived in New York City on December 8, 1904, just one year after Yamashita came to the States.

=== Chronology of exhibitions ===
- February 3, 1905: Tomita and Maeda gave an exhibition at the Harlem branch of YMCA.
- February 7, 1905: Six hundred spectators in the Columbia University gymnasium watched an exhibition of judo and "two-handed sword fighting" (kendo) by six Japanese experts. According to New-York Daily Tribune, industrialist Edward Henry Harriman brought the experts to America after he became interested in "this type of fighting" on his trip to Asia. Tomita had Maeda rush up to him and take a vicious swing. Tomita would then grab Maeda by the arm or throat and swing him to the mat.
- February 16, 1905: Tomita and Maeda gave a demonstration "before 1000 Princeton students". Maeda threw N. B. Tooker, a Princeton football player, while Tomita threw Samuel Feagles, the Princeton gymnasium instructor.
- February 21, 1905: Tomita and Maeda gave a judo demonstration at the United States Military Academy at West Point, New York, where Tomita and Maeda performed kata (patterns)—nage-no, koshiki, ju-no, and so on. At the request of the crowd, Maeda wrestled a cadet and threw him easily. Because Tomita had been the thrower in the kata, the cadets wanted to wrestle him too. Tomita threw the first (Charles Daly) without any trouble. However, Tomita twice failed to throw another football player named Tipton using tomoe-nage (stomach throw). Tomita was much smaller, so the Japanese claimed a moral victory.
- March 8, 1905: Tomita and Maeda did better at the New York Athletic Club. "Their best throw was a sort of flying cartwheel," said an article in the New York Times, describing Maeda's match with heavyweight (200 pound) wrestler John Naething. "Because of the difference in methods the two men rolled about the mat like schoolboys in a rough-and-tumble fight. After fifteen minutes of wrestling, Maeda secured the first fall. Ultimately, however, Naething was awarded the match by pin fall."
- March 21, 1905: Tomita and Maeda gave another judo demonstration at Columbia University, this time to about 200 students and instructors in the gymnasium. Following introductions by Prof. Bashford Dean, the first part of the demonstration involved showing exercises to "obtain control of the muscles." Then Tomita showed some grips and holds slowly first, then with "lightning speed on his unfortunate assistant." Then Tomita and Maeda tried "a number of wrestling tricks" on the university's wrestling instructor, "who was almost chocked to the suffocating point by one of them." According to Columbia Spectator, "Another interesting feature was the exhibition of some of the obsolete jiu jitsu tricks for defense with a fan against an opponent armed with the curved Japanese sword."
- April 5, 1905: Tomita held an exhibition match at the gymnasium on Broadway for the benefit of the press. During the event, Tomita stated that an erroneous impression existed in the United States as to jiu-jitsu being a self-defense martial art:

Jiu-jitsu is an almost extinct art, and a savage one that were better extinct. The real art of self-defense is ju-do. Jiu-jitsu was developed 350 years ago, at a time when there was tribal warfare in Japan. Then a man with a long sword and a man with no sword would meet in the streets. And out of their undying hatred for one another, tribally speaking, it became necessary for the man with no sword to learn a few tricks for dislocating the joints of his enemy, choking him, and rendering him unconscious, etcetera.

- July 6, 1905: Tomita and Maeda gave a judo exhibition at YMCA in Newport, Rhode Island.
- September 30, 1905: Tomita and Maeda gave a demonstration at another YMCA, in Lockport, New York. In Lockport, the local opponent was Mason Shimer, who wrestled Tomita unsuccessfully.

=== Other notable events ===
In April 1905, Tomita and Maeda started a judo club in a commercial space at 1947 Broadway in New York. Members of this club included Japanese expatriates, plus a European American woman named Wilma Berger.

During his return to Japan in 1910, Tomita visited Seattle. To celebrate his visit, the local judo club known as Seattle Dojo held a judo tournament on October 27, 1910, that was attended by local reporters.

== Family ==
Tomita's son, Tomita Tsuneo (富田常雄), was a novelist, best known for his judo novels Sanshiro Sugata (1942) and Yawara (1964–65).
