= Kōdōkan Shitennō =

Judoka

Four Guardians of the Kōdōkan

Japanese name
- Kanji: 講道館四天王
- Hiragana: こうどうかんしてんのう

Four Guardians of the Kōdōkan refers to the four notable judo competitors of the early Kōdōkan: Tomita Tsunejirō, Yamashita Yoshitsugu, Yokoyama Sakujiro, and Saigō Shirō.

== Four Guardians of the Kōdōkan ==
"Kōdōkan Shiten'nō" (講道館四天王) literally translates as Four Heavenly Kings of the Kōdōkan. Shiten'nō refers to four Devarajas, Hindu gods, historically adapted by Japanese Buddhism. Traditionally, the Four Heavenly Kings are the guardian gods that are worshipped as the protecting deities of Buddhist sanctuaries.

When Kanō Jigorō began to develop judo from jujutsu, his efforts met with opposition from jujutsu practitioners. However, Kano drew a loyal following that included exceptional fighters. Hence the term "Four Guardians of the Kōdōkan" came into existence referring to Tomita Tsunejirō along with Yamashita Yoshitsugu, Yokoyama Sakujiro, and Saigō Shirō.

Four Guardians of the Kōdōkan
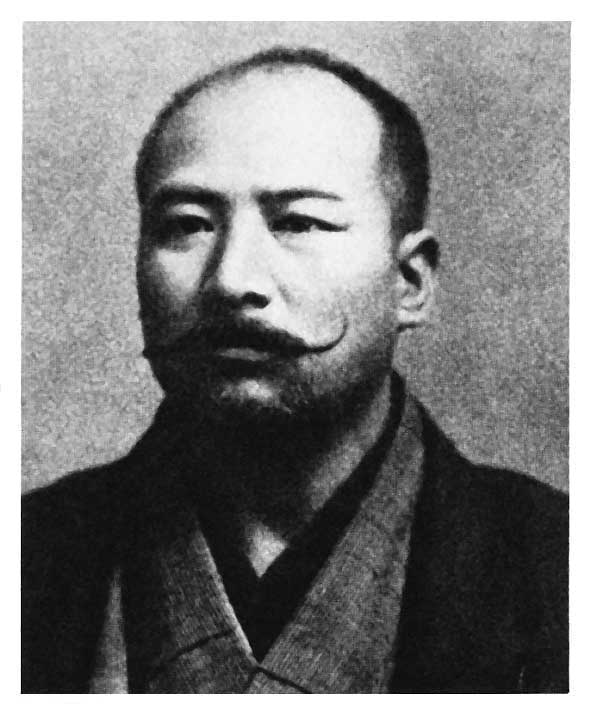
Yokoyama Sakujiro
(1864 – 1914)

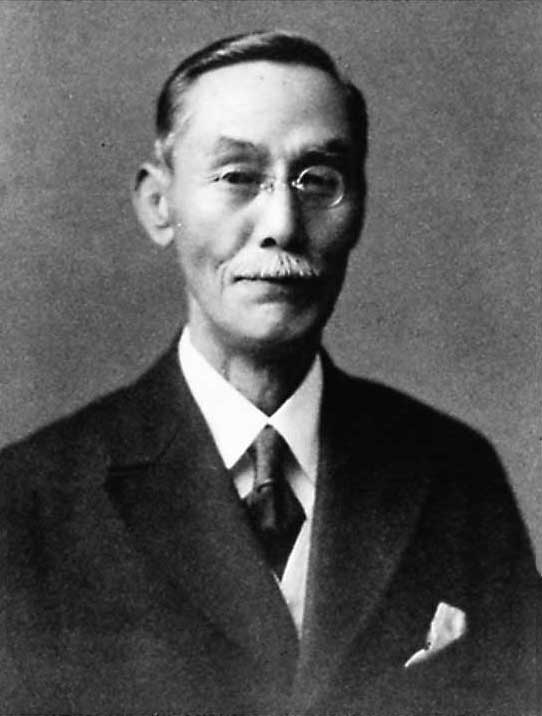
Tomita Tsunejirō
(1865 – 1937)

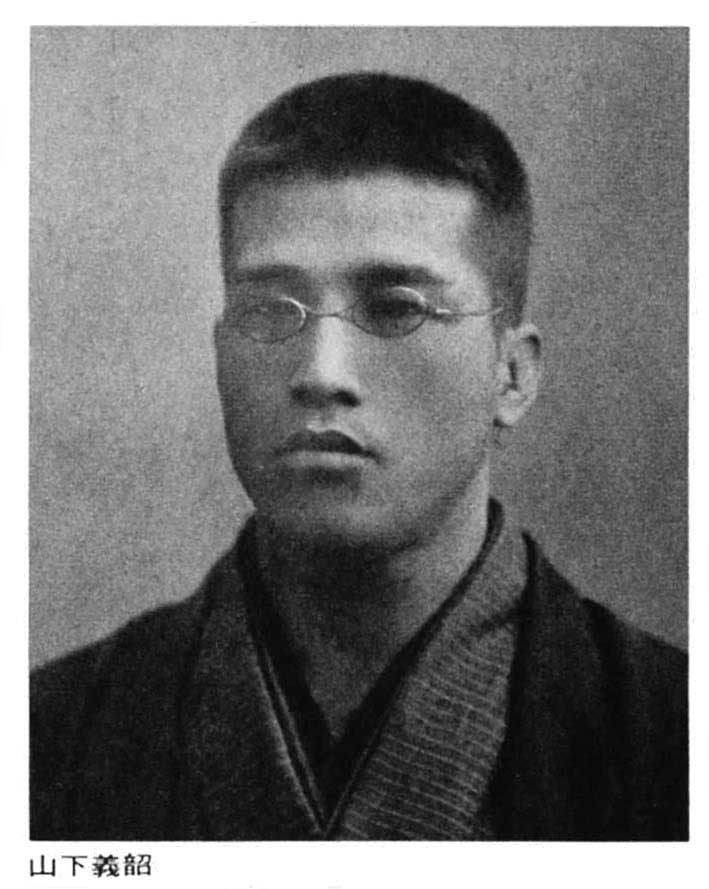
Yamashita Yoshitsugu
(1865 – 1935)

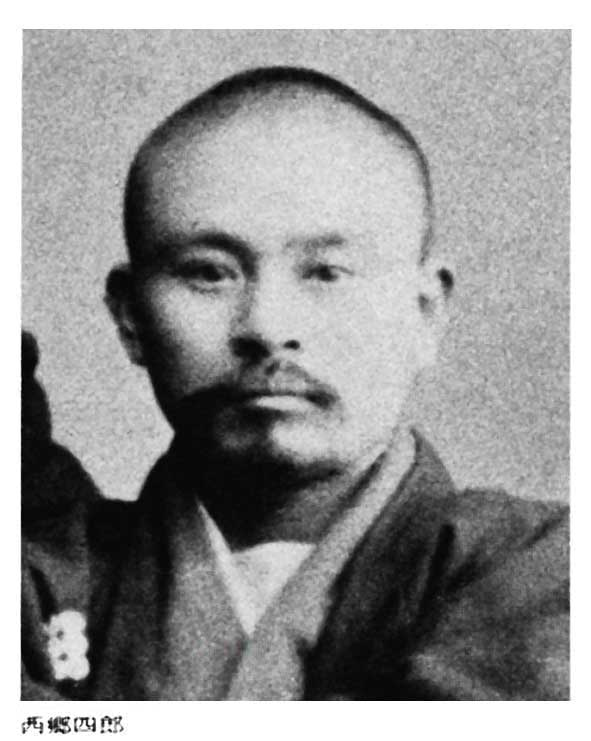
Saigō Shirō
(1866 – 1922)

== See also ==
- Shitennō (samurai)
- Shitennō (Tokugawa clan)
