= Masato Tamura =

American judoka

Masato Tamura (1913–1982) was an American judoka. He was born in Fife, Washington, United States, in 1913. By 1965 he was a 7th dan in judo. In 1969, Tamura was awarded the Black Belt Magazine Hall of Fame for Judo Instructor. In 1972 he operated a dojo in California.

== Judo career ==
Tamura originally trained in Seattle Dojo. He was promoted to 3rd-degree black belt by Jigaro Kano. Tamura trained his brother Vince Tamura into a national champion and international competitor in judo. Tamura was instrumental in developing the hand-to-hand techniques used by the US Armed Forces. This was after defeating an opponent over 50 pounds (23 kg) more than himself. Tamura is a former president of the United States Judo Federation.

== Personal life ==
Tamura was married with three children. Two of his daughters, Rosemarie and Diane Tamura, were competitors in judo. His son is Frank Tamura. His wife Rose died in 2012, while Tamura died from cancer in 1982.
