= Kichio Allen Arai =

American architect (1900–1966)

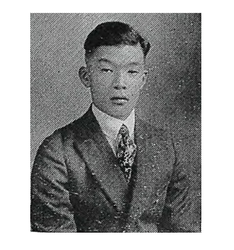
- Born: August 30, 1900, or 1901; Port Blakely, Bainbridge Island, Washington
- Died: October 13, 1966; Los Angeles, California
- Education: University of Washington, Harvard University
- Occupation: Architect
- Buildings: Seattle Betsuin Buddhist Temple

Kichio Allen Arai (c. 1901 – 1966) was a Japanese American architect known for designing Buddhist temples in the Pacific Northwest. He was the first Asian American in Seattle to design buildings under his own name.

== Biography ==
Arai played baseball for the Nippon Athletic Club, shown at right in a 1927 match against Waseda University

He was born to Japanese immigrant parents in Port Blakeley, Bainbridge Island, Washington. Although his birth was originally reported as August 30, 1901, his father later stated in 1921 that he was actually born on August 30, 1900, in an affidavit to amend Kichio's birth certificate. However, he continued to write his birthday as 1901.

Their family moved to the International District in Seattle where they stayed from the before 1910 until they were forcibly located by Japanese internment during World War II. He spoke Japanese and visited Japan once for less than 6 months during the 1910s. He graduated from Broadway High School in Seattle in 1919. From 1919 to 1925, he attended University of Washington, where he received a bachelor's degree in architecture. In 1925, he was one of at least five students of Japanese descent to graduate from the UW architecture program. In the 1920s, he played baseball semi-professionally for the Nippon Athletic Club in Seattle, where he was a left-handed center fielder.

In 1929, he attended graduate school at Harvard University's School of Architecture, graduating with a Masters of Architecture in June 1930. He married Nobu Kawaguchi on October 6, 1932.

In 1940, the original building of the Seattle Buddhist Church (now known as the Seattle Betsuin Buddhist Temple) was condemned to make way for construction of the Yesler Terrace housing project. Arai was commissioned to design the replacement and construction started in late 1940. Although he had completed his M.Arch., he lacked an architecture license, so Pierce A. Horrocks was the architect of record. The building was completed on October 5, 1941, just a few months before he and most of the sangha would be forcibly removed and interned in camps.

=== Internment ===
After the Japanese attack on Pearl Harbor in December 1941, President Roosevelt ordered all Americans of Japanese descent on the west coast to be interned in camps. Arai registered for the draft on February 15, 1942, just days before Executive Order 9066 was signed on February 19. Like most Japanese Americans in Seattle, he was interned at Minidoka in Idaho, arriving with his sons on August 18, 1942. His wife Nobu and daughter arrived a few weeks later on September 5.

He was able to leave the camp early for employment by working as a draftsman, traveling to Madison, Wisconsin, on October 15, 1944. The rest of his family left the camp on May 28, 1945.

=== Later life ===
After internment, Seattle's Nihonmachi declined and the Arai family moved to the Central District, where they stayed until at least 1950. He died in 1966 in Los Angeles and was buried in Bellevue.

== Works ==
- Seattle Nichiren Buddhist Church (1928-1929) and garage (1933)
- Torii gate in Seward Park, originally constructed for the Seattle Potlach festival (1934)
- Seattle Dojo (1934)
- Seattle Nisei Veterans Hall (1940)
- Seattle Betsuin Buddhist Temple (1940-1941)
- Yakima Buddhist Bussei Kaikan (1936-1941) in Wapato, Washington
- Idaho-Oregon Buddhist Temple (1955-1958) in Ontario, Oregon
- White River Buddhist Temple (1963-1964) in Auburn, Washington
- Shinran Shonin 700th Anniversary Memorial Hall annex (1963-1964)
