= Vince Tamura =

Judoka

Yoshito Vince Tamura (July 25, 1929 – April 20, 2010) was a former international competitor in judo.

== Judo career ==
Tamura represented the United States in the first Judo World Championships in 1956 and served as a referee in the 1964 Olympics for judo. Tamura won the 1954, 1956, and 1959 US National Judo Championships placing second and third in 1957 and 1958, respectively. He continued to compete into the 1970s.

Tamura's brother Mas Tamura was promoted by Jigaro Kano to Yondan inspiring Tamura into judo. By the time he died in 2010, Vince Tamura was ranked 9th Dan.

== Personal life ==
Tamura was a descendant of the Taira Clan, and served in the US Army Combat Engineers of the First Cavalry Division during the Korean War, earning a Bronze Star. He co-authored a book Common Sense Self Defense and was also an instructor of Heike-Ryu Jiu Jitsu.

Tamura had a wife, Yuri, and two sons, Bob and David Tamura. Tamura was the youngest of 7 sons and 4 daughters.
