= Yasuo Ohara =

Japanese aikido instructor

Yasuo Ohara was a Japanese aikido instructor, and the founder of the New York Aikikai.

Ohara moved to New York City in the 1950s to study Business Administration at Columbia University. After he performed at a martial arts demonstration there in 1961 he was approached by fellow-student Barry Bernstein, who asked Ohara to teach him aikido. They were joined by others, including a number of judoka, and became the New York Aikikai. At this time Ohara, a 2-dan, was the only aikido teacher on America's East Coast. After Ohara's return to Japan, control of the club was assumed by Yoshimitsu Yamada.

As well as founding the New York Aikikai, Ohara is also noted for teaching Adele Westbrook and Oscar Ratti, the authors of Aikido and the Dynamic Sphere.
