= Kenji Yamada (judoka) =

American judoka (1924–2014)

Kenji Yamada (1924–2014) was a competitive judoka who was a two-time U.S. National Judo champion.

Yamada was born in Sunnyside, Utah, but was raised in Japan. In 1941, he returned to the United States to rejoin his father in Seattle, Washington. A year later, after Executive Order 9066 was signed, he was imprisoned with other Americans of Japanese descent at the Minidoka Relocation Center in Idaho. Yamada graduated from Franklin High School in Seattle and later, the University of Washington.

Yamada won the 1954 and 1955 US Judo National Championships where he competed at 150 lbs. In 1954, he lost to judoka Gene Lebell (who outweighed Yamada by about 50 pounds) in the open division finals in 1954 due to a judge's decision.

Yamada was a member of the Seattle Dojo and was one of the key people in spreading judo around the United States. Yamada obtained his 8th degree black belt in judo. Yamada died on April 10, 2014.
