= Yamashita Yoshitsugu =

Japanese judoka (1865–1935)

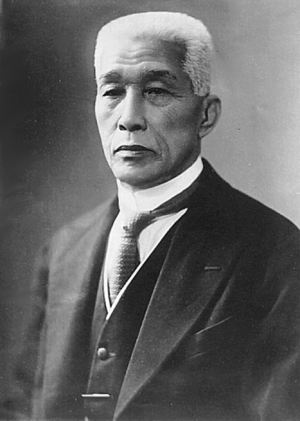
- Yamashita Yoshitsugu, first 10th dan judoka
- Born: February 16, 1865; Kanazawa, Kaga Province, Japan
- Died: October 26, 1935 (aged 70)
- Native name: 山下 義韶
- Style: Judo
- Teacher: Kano Jigoro
- Rank: Judo: 10th dan Tenjin Shin'yō-ryū: Complete license

Other information
- Notable students: Theodore Roosevelt; Imperial Japanese Naval Academy; Tokyo Imperial University; US Naval Academy; Tokyo Municipal Police

Yamashita Yoshitsugu (山下 義韶, February 16, 1865 – October 26, 1935), also known as Yamashita Yoshiaki, was a Japanese judoka. He was the first person to have been awarded 10th degree red belt (jūdan) rank in Kodokan judo, although posthumously. He was also one of the Four Guardians of the Kodokan, and a pioneer of judo in the United States.

== Biography ==
=== Early years ===
Yamashita was born in Kanazawa, then the capital of the powerful Kaga Domain. His father was of the samurai class. As a boy, Yamashita trained in the traditional (koryū) Japanese martial arts schools of Yōshin-ryū and Tenjin Shin'yō-ryū jujutsu. In August 1884, he joined the Kodokan judo dojo of his childhood friend Kano Jigoro as its nineteenth member. He advanced to first degree black belt (shodan) rank in three months, fourth degree (yodan) ranking in two years, and sixth degree (rokudan) in fourteen years. He was prone to discuss the philosophy of judo with Kano, as Yamashita initially believed power should be applied before technique.

He was a member of the Kodokan team that competed with Tokyo Metropolitan Police jujutsu teams during the mid-1880s, and during the 1890s, his jobs included teaching judo at the Imperial Japanese Naval Academy and Tokyo Imperial University (modern University of Tokyo). His role as a Kodokan competitor was specially notable in the Kodokan-Totsuka rivalry, in 1886. He fought and dominated famed jujutsuka Taro Terushima, although the match went to a draw when Terushima resorted to groundwork. He later rematched him, knocking him out with a hard ippon seoi nage.

A notoriously violent man, Yamashita was known for his many street fights. In the most famous instance, he got involved in a brawl with no less than 17 laborers in Tokyo due to a dispute in a restaurant. Despite their vast numeric advantage, added to the fact that some of them wielded knives, Yamashita and a fellow judoka disposed of all the men, purposely breaking the arms of three of them in the process. Shortly after, Yoshiaki would get into another quarrel with another cadre of laborers, this time him against 15 of them, but it ended up the same way: Yamashita maimed his attackers with chokes and throws, and even killed some of them by breaking their necks. He was arrested, but was easily acquitted after proving the uneven nature of the brawls. However, he was still suspended by the Kodokan for excessive use of violence. When confronted by Kano himself, Yamashita protested and went to the extent of challenging his master to a fight, but Kano convinced to stop his violent ways by making him realize that some day he might be harmed the same way he liked to harm people.

=== Introducing judo to America ===
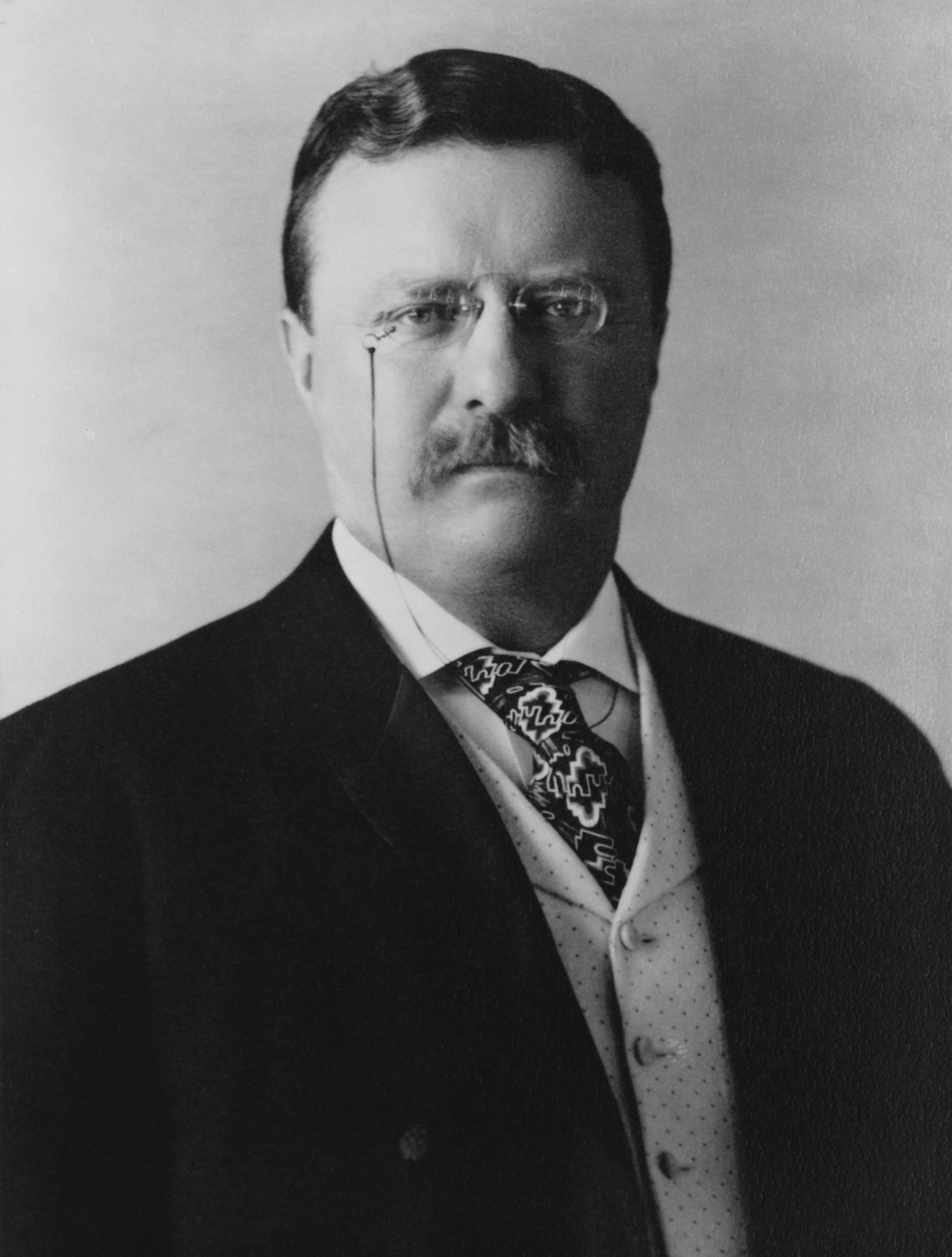
President Theodore Roosevelt, 1904

In February 1902, Seattle-based railroad executive Samuel Hill decided that his 9-year-old son, James Nathan, should learn judo, which he had apparently seen or heard about while on a business trip to Japan. In Hill's words, the idea was for the boy to learn "the ideals of the Samurai class, for that class of men is a noble, high-minded class. They look beyond the modern commercial spirit." Hill spoke to a Japanese American business associate, Masajiro Furuya, for advice. Furuya referred Hill to Kazuyoshi Shibata, who was a student at Yale University. Shibata told Hill about Yamashita, and on July 21, 1903, Hill wrote a letter to Yamashita, asking him to come to Seattle at Hill's expense. On August 26, 1903, Yamashita replied, writing that he, his wife, and one of his students (Saburo Kawaguchi) would leave for Seattle on September 22, 1903.

The ship carrying the Yamashita party docked in Seattle on October 8, 1903. A week later, on October 17, 1903, Yamashita and Kawaguchi gave a judo exhibition at a Seattle theater that Hill had rented for the evening. Attendance was by invitation only, and guests included Sam Hill's mother-in-law, Mary Hill (wife of railroader J.J. Hill), Senator Russell Alger, and assorted Sportswriters. Afterwards, Hill took the Yamashita party east to Washington, D.C., where Mrs. Hill and young James Nathan were then living. Meanwhile, the favorable publicity surrounding the event caused Japanese Americans living in Seattle to start their own judo club, known as the Seattle Dojo.

Soon after arriving in the District of Columbia, Yamashita visited the Japanese Legation, and in March 1904, the Japanese naval attaché, Commander Takeshita Isamu, took Yamashita to the White House to meet President Theodore Roosevelt. Roosevelt practiced wrestling and boxing while in the White House, and he had received jujutsu jackets from William Sturgis Bigelow and jujutsu lessons from J. J. O'Brien, a Philadelphia police officer who had studied jujutsu while living in Nagasaki. Roosevelt was impressed with Yamashita's skill, and during March and April 1904, Yamashita gave judo lessons to the President and presidential secretary William Loeb Jr. in a room at the White House. Subsequently, at other locations, Yamashita and his wife Fude gave lessons to prominent American women, to include Martha Blow Wadsworth (sister of Kindergarten pioneer Susan Blow), Hallie Elkins (wife of Senator Stephen Benton Elkins), and Grace Davis Lee (Hallie Elkins' sister), and their children. American women soon began training in jujutsu as a means of self-defense and as a symbol of their growing political empowerment.

Roosevelt, concerned that the United States would lose its military supremacy to rising powers like Japan, began to advocate for jujutsu training for American soldiers. In January 1905, Yamashita got a job teaching judo at the U.S. Naval Academy. There were about 25 students in his class, including a future admiral, Robert L. Ghormley. The position ended at the end of the school term, and Yamashita was not rehired for the following year. When President Roosevelt heard of this, he spoke to the Secretary of the Navy, who in turn told the Superintendent of the Naval Academy to rehire Yamashita. Consequently, Yamashita's judo was taught at the Naval Academy throughout the first six months of 1906.

=== Later life ===
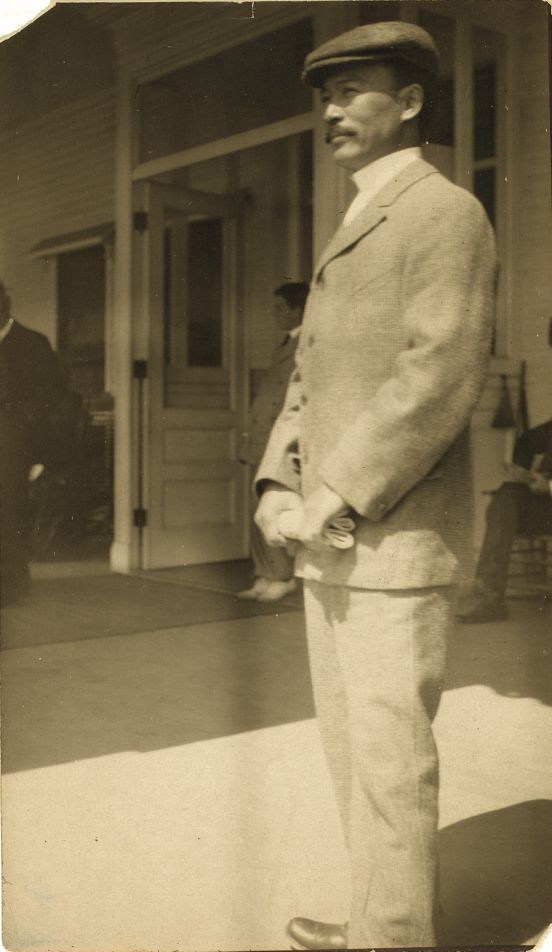
Commander Takeshita Isamu at Portsmouth, New Hampshire, in 1905.

At the end of the 1906 academic year, Yamashita left the United States for Japan. On July 24, 1906, he participated in a conference in Kyoto that had been called for the purpose of standardizing judo forms (kata) that could be taught in Japanese public schools.

From the 1910s to the 1930s, Yamashita worked as a judo teacher at Tokyo Higher Normal School (東京高等師範学校, Tōkyō Kōtō Shihan Gakkō). In this capacity, he often attended judo tournaments and exhibitions. He also taught judo to the Tokyo Municipal Police. Thus, from September 1924 to April 1926, Yamashita was part of a committee that developed a new kata for Japanese police.

An example of Yamashita's teaching method is the advice:

Always try to think of improvement, and don't think that you are too good. The latter is very easy to do while learning judo.

Yamashita's last major public appearance was probably the celebration of the 50th anniversary of the establishment of the Kodokan, an event which took place in November 1934. British judoka Sarah Mayer described Yamashita's participation as follows:

One of the Imperial Princes was present and the Emperor sent a present of money. A speech was read from the Prime Minister and the Minister of Education delivered a long oration. All the famous Judo men were there and there was a rather touching scene when Mr. Yamashita, the oldest pupil, came forward. He has lost his voice with advancing years and another man had to read his speech for him, but as he stood facing Prof. Kano I could not help thinking of the long years that these two men, now so old, had struggled to make Judo popular, and what a wonderful day it must be to them to have lived to see such an amazing achievement. Famous men demonstrated beautiful Kata when the speeches were over and Prof. Kano had dedicated three trees to his three teachers, and comic relief was provided by a match between me and [Kaichiro] Samura, who was good enough to get the worst of it.

His ultimate promotion to 10th dan was posthumous.
