= Seattle Betsuin Buddhist Temple =

Buddhist temple in Seattle, Washington, US

Coordinates: 47°35′59″N 122°18′47″W

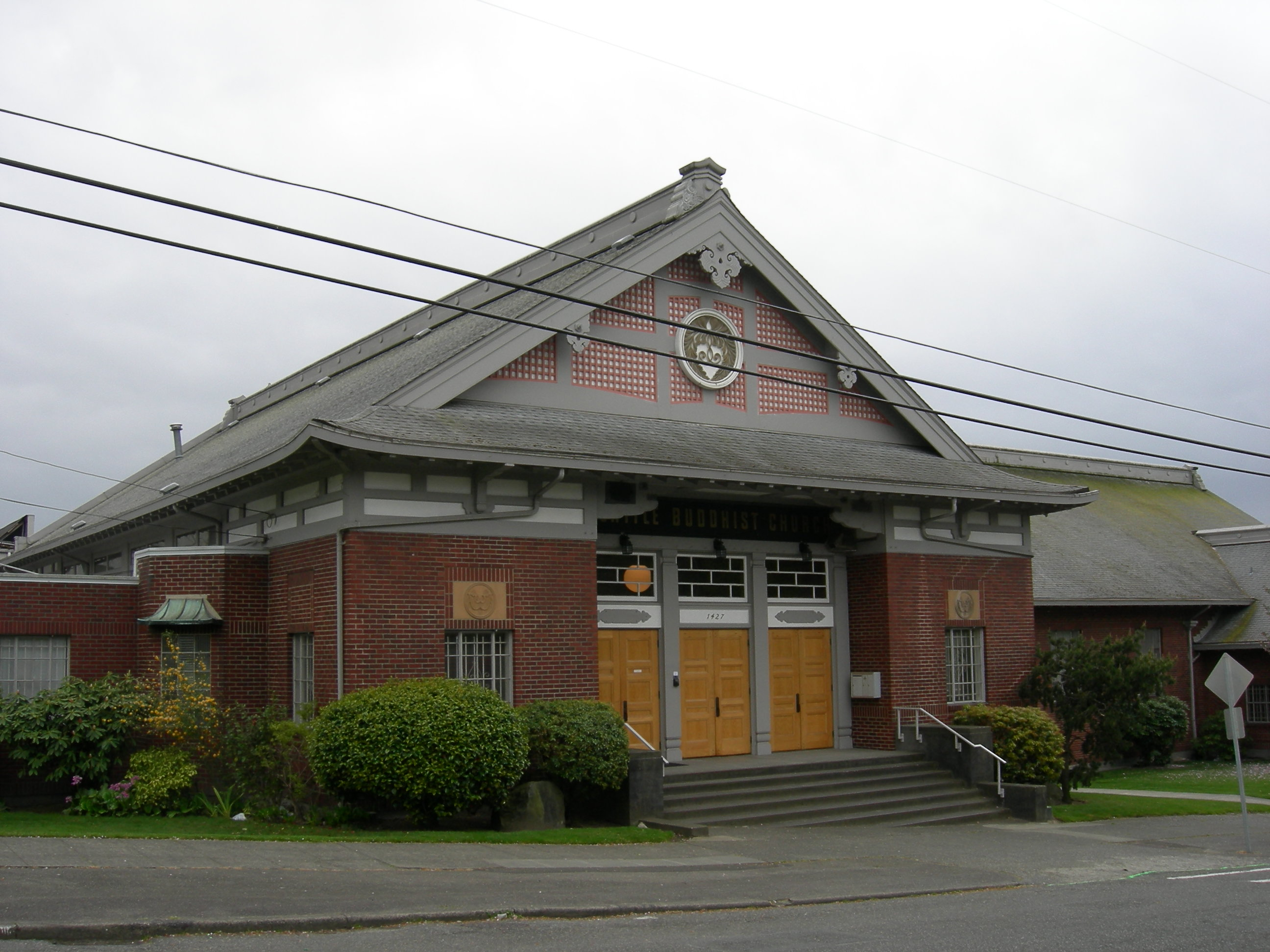
- Seattle Buddhist Church (2007)

Religion
- Affiliation: Jōdo Shinshū
- Deity: Amitābha
- Ecclesiastical or organizational status: Betsuin temple
- Governing body: Buddhist Churches of America
- Leadership: Reverend Katsuya Kusunoki
- Status: Active
- Mother temple: Nishi Hongan-ji

Location
- Location: Seattle
- State: Washington
- Country: United States
- Interactive map of Seattle Betsuin Buddhist Temple

Architecture
- Architects: Kichio Allen Arai, Pierce A. Horrocks (architect of record)
- Established: 1941
- Designated as a Seattle landmark in 1976.

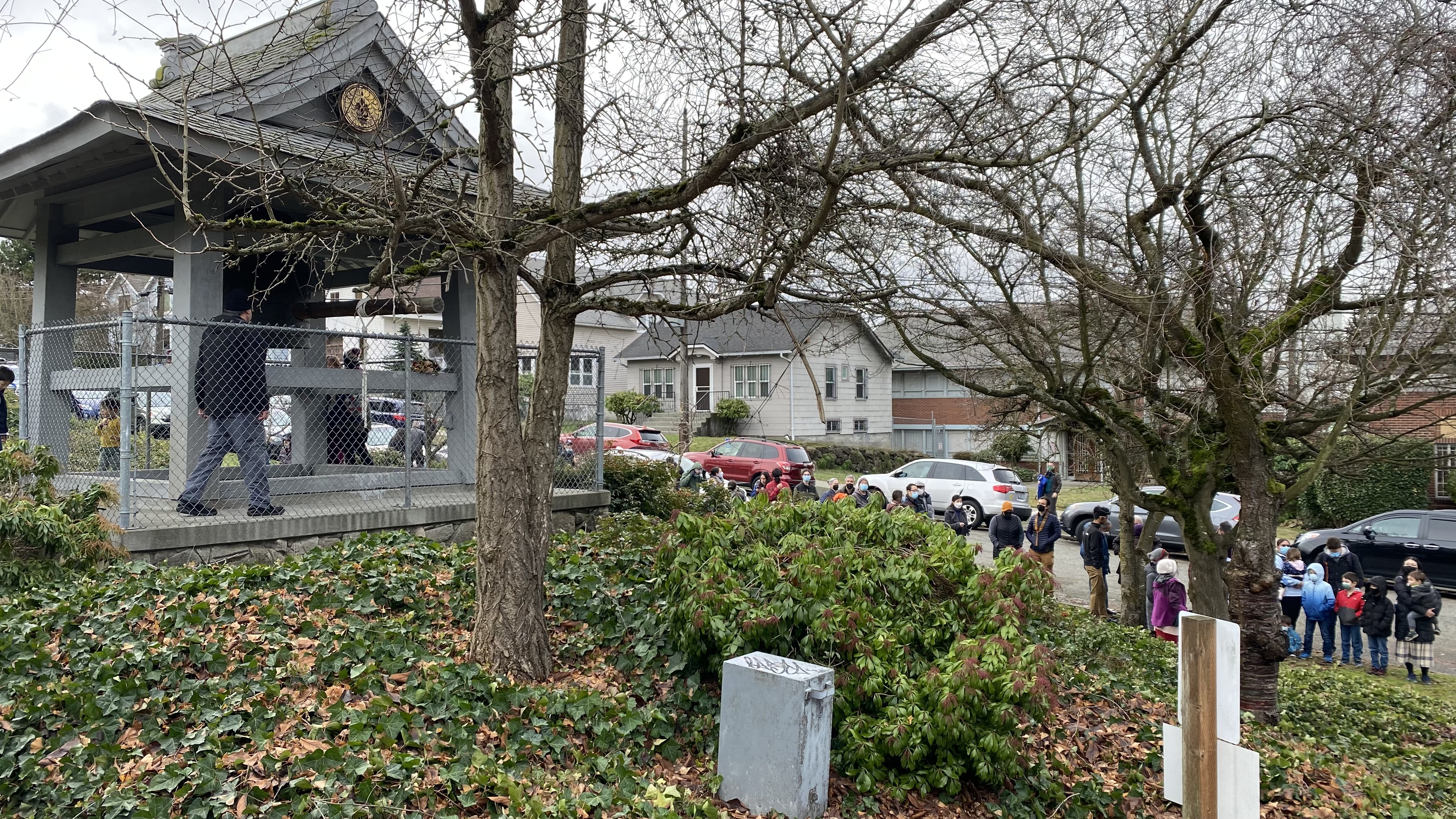
Temple members line up for bell ringing (joyanokane (除夜の鐘)) on New Year's Eve 2022

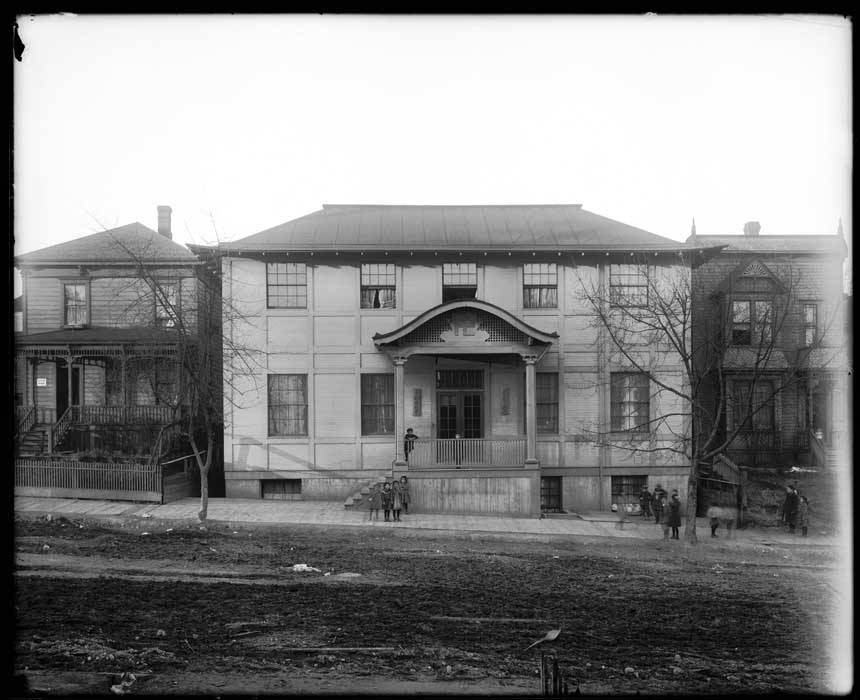
Earlier building four blocks west at 1020 South Main Street, photographed circa 1914

Seattle Betsuin Buddhist Temple (built 1940–41) is a Japanese Jodo Shinshu Buddhist temple in Seattle, Washington, United States. It is a member of the Buddhist Churches of America. Its original name is the Seattle Buddhist Church.

Although it was designed by Japanese American Kichio Allen Arai, the architect of record was Pierce A. Horrocks, because Arai lacked an architectural license. It replaced an earlier building (built 1906–1908 by Saunders & Lawton) that was torn down as part of the Yesler Terrace project.

The building is a designated Seattle landmark. An arson fire on December 31, 2023, destroyed the temple's archives and damaged an altar.

== See also ==
- History of the Japanese in Seattle
- List of Buddhist temples in the United States
