= Dan (rank) =

Ranking system used in East Asia

- Dan and Kyū ranks are indicated by belt color or by stripes on the belt.

Chinese name
- Traditional Chinese: 段
- Simplified Chinese: 段
Transcriptions
Standard Mandarin
- Hanyu Pinyin: duàn
Yue: Cantonese
- Jyutping: dyun6

Vietnamese name
- Vietnamese alphabet: đoạn
- Chữ Hán: 段

Korean name
- Hangul: 단
- Hanja: 段
Transcriptions
- Revised Romanization: dan
- McCune–Reischauer: tan

Japanese name
- Kanji: 段
- Hiragana: だん
Transcriptions
- Revised Hepburn: Dan

The dan (段) ranking system is used by many Japanese, Okinawan, Korean, and other martial arts organizations to indicate the level of a person's ability within a given system. Used as a ranking system to quantify skill level in a specific domain, it was originally used at a Go school during the Edo period. It is now also used in most modern Japanese fine and martial arts.

Martial arts writer Takao Nakaya claims that this dan system was first applied to martial arts in Japan by Kanō Jigorō (1860–1938), the founder of judo, in 1883, and later introduced to other East Asian countries. In modern Japanese martial arts, holders of dan ranks often wear a black belt; those of higher rank may also wear either red-and-white or red belts depending on the style. Dan ranks are also given for strategic board games such as Go, Japanese chess (shōgi), and renju, as well as for other arts such as the tea ceremony (sadō or chadō), flower arrangement (ikebana), Japanese calligraphy (shodō), and Japanese archery (Kyudo). Today, this ranking system is part of the hallmark, landscape, and cultural "adhesive" of modern Japanese society.

The Chinese character for the word dan (段) literally means step or stage in Japanese, but is also used to refer to one's rank, grade, or station, i.e., one's degree or level of expertise, knowledge and seniority. In Chinese pinyin, however, the same character is pronounced duàn in Mandarin with the 4th tone, and was originally used to mean phase. Dan is often used together with the word kyū (級) in certain ranking systems, with dan being used for the higher ranks and kyū being used for lower ranks.

== History ==
The dan ranking system in Go was devised by Hon'inbō Dōsaku (1645–1702), a professional Go player in the Edo period. Prior to the invention, top-to-bottom ranking was evaluated by comparison of handicap and tended to be vague. Dosaku valued the then highest title holder, Meijin at 9 Dan. He was likely inspired by an ancient Chinese Go ranking system (9 Pin Zhi) and an earlier court ranking system (nine-rank system), although lower numbers are more senior in those systems.

Dan ranks were transferred to martial arts by Kanō Jigorō (1860–1938), the founder of judo. Kanō started the modern rank system in 1883 when he awarded shodan (the lowest dan rank) to two of his senior students (Shiro Saigo and Tomita Tsunejirō). Prior to this, martial arts schools rewarded progress with less frequent menkyo licenses, giving the disciple the right to teach what he has learnt, the menkyo system containing in itself several ranks, the latter being the menkyo kaiden (免許皆伝）, the license attesting that the disciple has mastered the whole teaching of the art; another way of rewarding a particularly skilled disciple was by choosing him as next sōke by transmitting him the secret scrolls of the school, the densho (伝書）.

There was still no external differentiation between yūdansha [有段者] (black belt ranks) and mudansha [無段者] (those who had not yet attained a dan grade). Different athletic departments within the Japanese school system were already using markers of rank, most notably in swimming, where advanced swimmers wore a black ribbon around their waists. Kano adopted the custom of having his yūdansha wear black obi (belts) in 1886.

At that time, these obi were not the belts that karateka and jūdōka wear today; the students were still practicing in kimono. They wore the wide obi still worn with formal kimono. In 1907, Kanō invented the modern keikogi (white practice uniforms), and belts in white for mudansha and black for yūdansha.

== Modern usage in Go ==
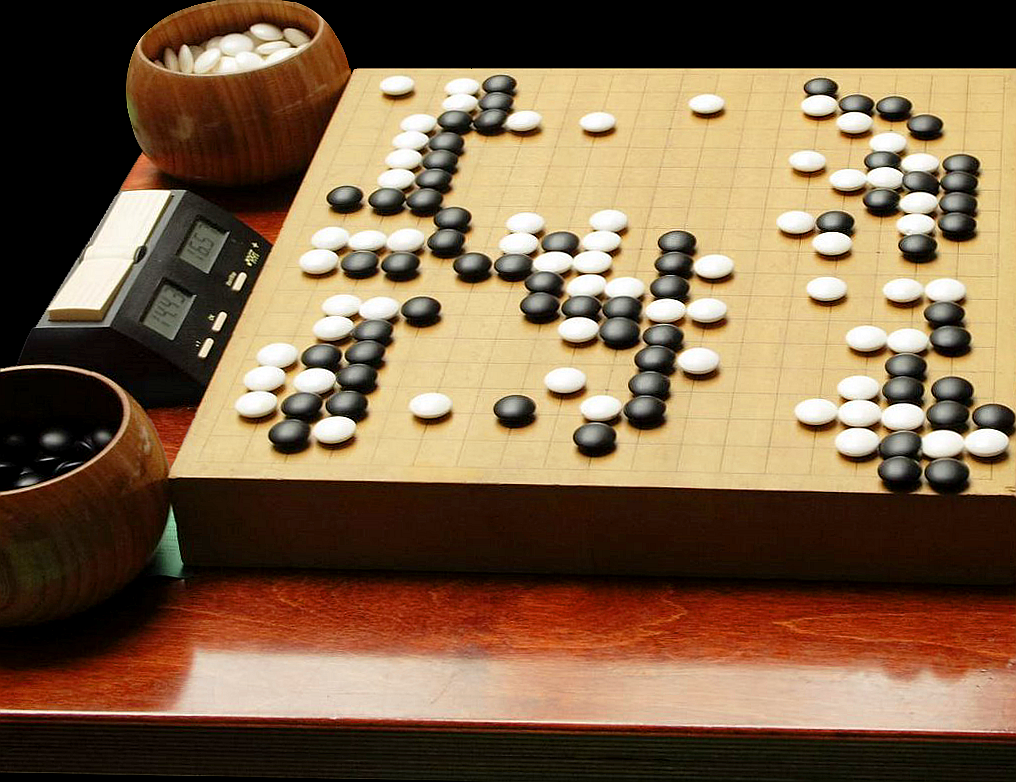
Go

Traditionally, the level of Go players has been defined using kyū and dan ranks. Kyu ranks are considered student ranks, whilst dan ranks are considered master ranks. Especially in amateur play, these ranks facilitate the handicapping system, with a difference of one rank roughly corresponding to one free move at the beginning of the game. With the ready availability of calculators and computers, "rating" systems have been introduced. In such systems, a rating is rigorously calculated on the basis of game results.

Dan (abbreviated online as "d") ranks are for advanced players. Although many organizations let players choose their own kyū rank to a certain extent, dan ranks are often regulated. This means that players will have to show good results in tournaments or pass exams to be awarded a dan rank. Serious students of the game will often strive to attain a dan rank. Dan ranks are generally available up to about 7th dan; professional player ranks go up to 9th dan.

== Modern usage in shogi ==
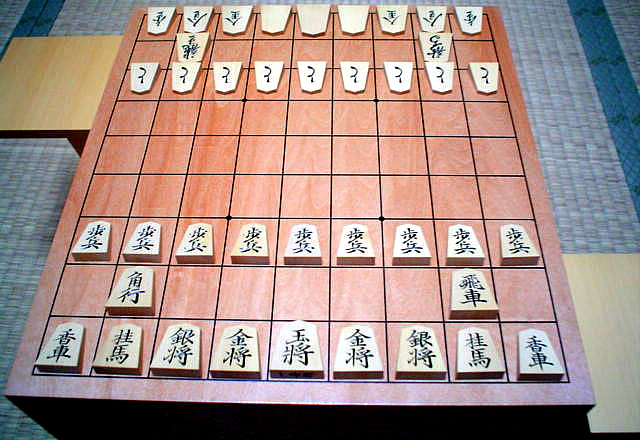
Shogi

As in Go, shogi has also traditionally used "dan" and "kyū" ranks to define the playing strength of a shogi player. Amateur players can, through over-the-board (OTB) play, achieve ranks from 15-kyū to 8-dan. In addition to dan and kyū, an Elo-type rating system is also used by the Japan Amateur Shogi Association for the tournaments it organizes.

The ranking system used by the Japan Shogi Association (JSA) for professionals uses similar terminology, but is actually quite different in terms of ability. Professional player ranks start at 4-dan and go up to 9-dan. There also used to be 10 dan ranking, but this is no longer used. Amateur players train to become professionals at one of the JSA's apprentice schools and are ranked from 6-kyū to 3-dan. Since only exceptionally strong amateur players are able to qualify for the apprentice school, it is generally believed that the typical apprentice school 6-kyū is at least the equivalent of an amateur 3- or 4-dan player. Apprentice professional 3-dan players who either win or finish runner-up in one of the two 3-dan league tournaments held each year are awarded the rank of 4-dan and granted professional status.

Although there is no difference in the systems used for men and women amateurs, the JSA and the Ladies Professional Shogi-players' Association of Japan, or LPSA, do use a slightly different system for ranking women professionals. Women's professionals are ranked from 2-kyū to 6-dan. (Note: Although it was once believed that even the strongest women's professionals were generally only equivalent in playing strength to apprentice professional 1- or 2-dan ranked players, the difference in playing strength has narrowed since the early 1990s and three females had actually made it as far as apprentice professional 3-dan by 2020: Kana Fukuma in 2013, Tomoka Nishiyama in 2015 and Nanami Naka in 2020. All three, however, decided to leave the apprentice school to become full-time women's professionals while still ranked as amateur professional 3-dan.)

== Usage in martial arts ==
While the use of the kyū/dan system, and colored belts is common to both gendai budō or arts of other east Asian origin, and to arts that are derived from these, or from other areas, it is not universal.

=== Japanese martial arts ===
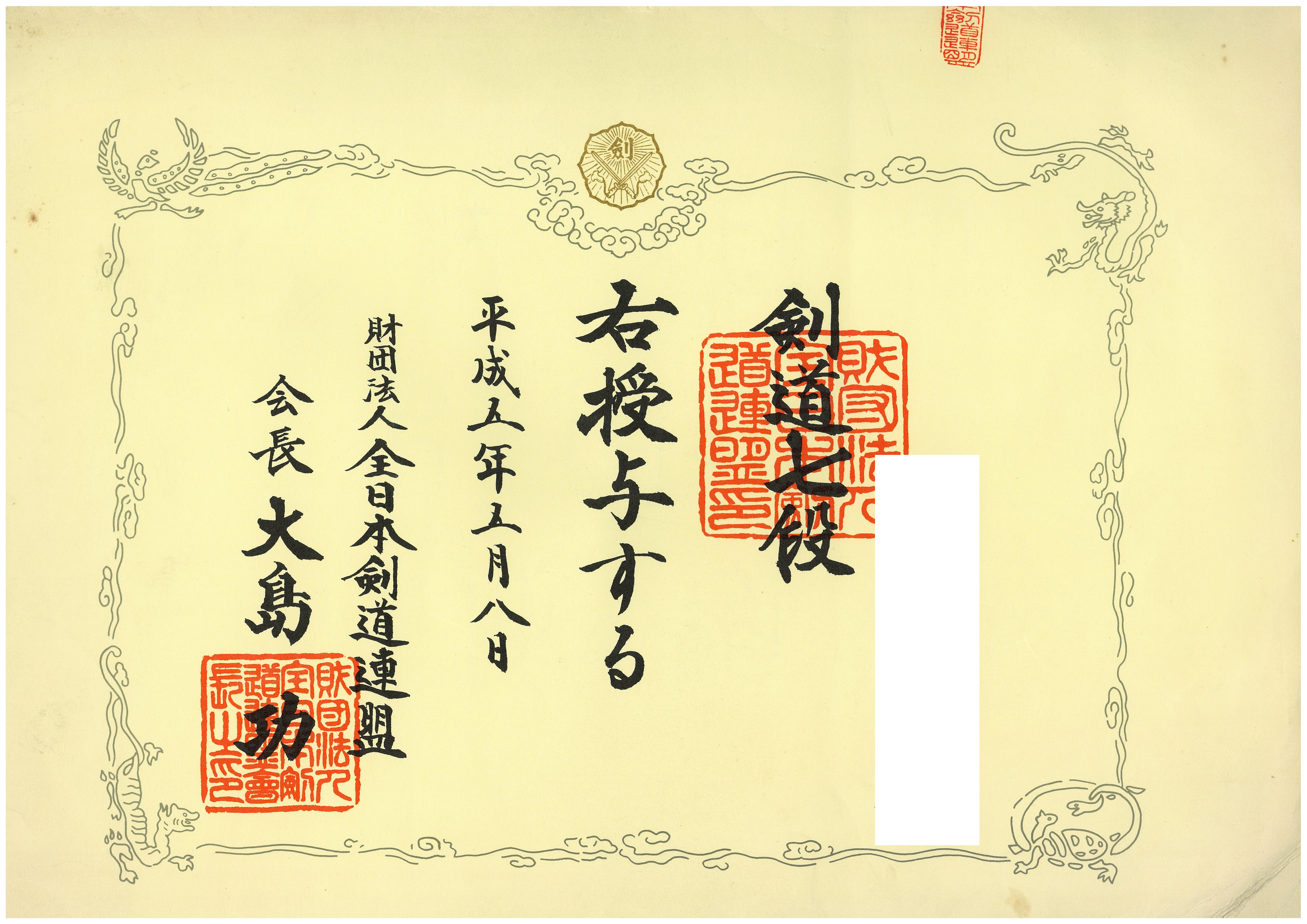
Diploma of 7th dan in Japanese kendo

In modern times, a dan-ranked practitioner of a style is usually recognized as a martial artist who has surpassed the kyū, or basic, ranks. They may also become a licensed instructor in their art. In many styles, however, achieving a dan rank means that, while one is no longer considered a beginner, one is not yet necessarily an expert. Rather, it indicates a high degree of competence across a reasonable range of techniques.

The total number of dan ranks is style-specific (1st to 5th and 1st to 10th are common in Japanese martial arts). The lower dan grades normally are attained through a grading examination or sometimes through competition. The higher dan grades usually require years of experience and contribution to the relevant modern martial art. This may be through instruction or research and publication. These grades can only be awarded by a higher-graded representative of the principal dojo or sometimes by a steering committee. There is no set achievement level that is universal. Ranking systems are specific to the school or style, so ranks do not necessarily translate across different martial arts styles. In fact, dan ranks do not necessarily indicate one wears a black belt. In martial arts such as iaidō, kendō or jōdō, no external signifier of rank is worn, though a black belt is by far the most recognizable symbol to the general public.

The highest dan ranks are sometimes reserved for the founder or leaders of a style and only high-ranking students can be promoted to them. For example, only five living people hold a tenth dan in judo and only about thirty-five worldwide have been promoted to the rank since its inception; of those 10th dan promotions only fifteen were conferred by the Kodokan, all of them to Japanese judoka. In other styles, the dan ranks are not the highest level that might be attained, with instructor certification and judge/judgment authorization being understood as higher-level or more sophisticated.

==== Ranks in Japanese ====
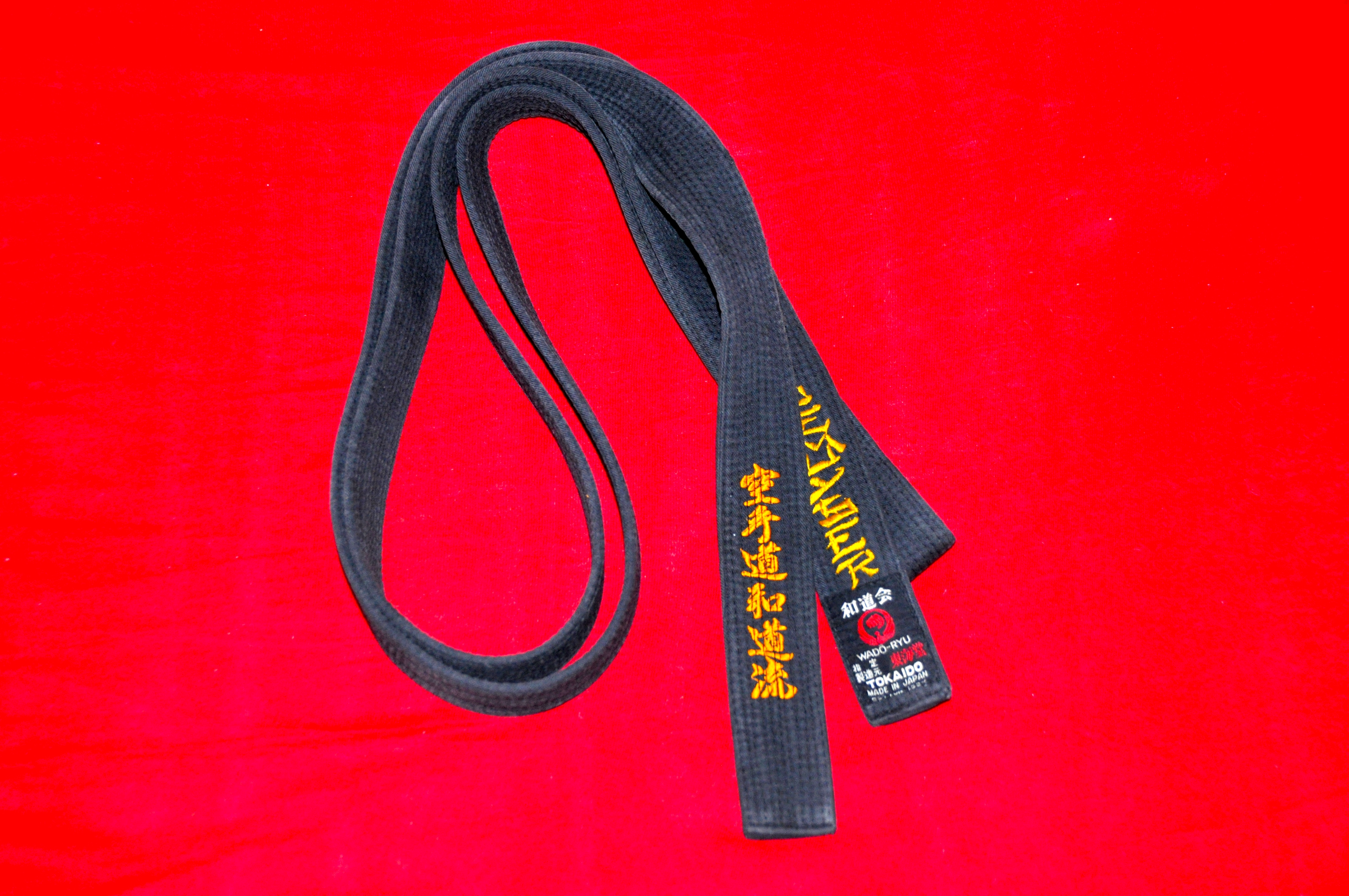
Black belt, wadō-ryū karate

Many arts use between one and ten dan ranks:

Degree	Pronunciation	Japanese
1st dan	Shodan (Note: Shodan is "beginning grade". Ichidan, 一段, is "first grade" but this is less commonly used.)	初段
2nd dan	Nidan	弐段/二段 (Note: The older kanji for "2"--弐--is usually used.)
3rd dan	Sandan	参段/三段 (Note: The older kanji for "3"--参--is usually used.)
4th dan	Yondan (Note: The Japanese word for four is pronounced the same as the word for death, hence Yondan is generally used in place of Shidan.)	四段
5th dan	Godan	五段
6th dan	Rokudan	六段
7th dan	Shichidan (Note: Sometimes also pronounced Nanadan.)	七段
8th dan	Hachidan	八段
9th dan	Kudan	九段
10th dan	Jūdan	十段

In many martial arts, black belts are often worn for all dan grades. In others, different colors are used, with the highest grade (10th dan) sometimes wearing a red belt in some systems. In Jūdo, 6th to 8th dan may wear a red and white-patterned belt, and 9th dan and above may wear a solid red belt. Blue with a red stripe is sometimes worn for Renshi (錬士) or for a person recognized by the older Ryu Kyu Kingdom title of Shinshi (from Shenshi, 紳士), a general Confucian term for a resident Chinese scholar and emissary. There is some variation even within styles. Generally, belts do not have markings that indicate the actual dan grade. Okinawan styles often use gold bars to denote the various masters titles rather than grades after fifth dan. Thus one gold stripe can designate Renshi (錬士), two designated Kyōshi (教士), and three designated Hanshi (範士). In the early 2000s, different Okinawan styles started using the stripes to designate individual dan grades above godan. Others, including many Uechi organizations, have followed suit, while others have not.

In many styles shodan implies that the basics of the style have been mastered. At about sandan, the student may start teaching independently but under the supervision of their teacher. The license for this level is shidōin (指導員), literally "member of instruction/coaching", which is often translated as "assistant instructor." At about the grade of godan, the holder may receive a full teaching license: shihan (師範), literally "instructor/model." Traditionally, someone who holds the shihan title may open their own school with this license. Many styles also have the separate teaching or "master" grades of renshi, kyoshi, and hanshi.

Generally, the lower dan grades are achieved by gaining greater knowledge and understanding of the art along with physical skill. The higher the dan grade, the more leadership ability, teaching experience, and service to the style play a role in promotion.

In modern kendo, the dan system was recently changed so that 8th dan is the highest attainable rank. Unlike Judo, all dan promotion within the All Japan Kendo Federation, International Kendo Federation and its member countries is by examination. Whereas dan grades are awarded for technical ability, there is a parallel shogo system awarding the higher teaching grades of renshi, kyoshi, and hanshi. Renshi and kyoshi are awarded by written examination while hanshi is awarded by election.

Although the dan system is distinctly Japanese, it has been adopted by many other martial arts styles. The dan system and the well-known symbol of a black belt have been absorbed into common usage to represent a person with above-average or highly trained skills in a particular discipline.

=== Chinese martial arts ===
In 1998, the Chinese Wushu Association together with the National Sport Commission and the Chinese Wushu Research Institute established a graduation system based on nine Duan levels. In 2011 the Duan Wei system was changed and a set of style books was issued for duan wei 1-6 exams. Examinations for each level are based on preset forms and applications, including partner forms. The badge has also been changed to include the duan wei number i.e. 1–6. Entry level for experienced practitioners has now been limited to 3rd Duan and below so as to tighten up the rankings.

Symbol: 段位 Duan Wei "level"

Beginning Level:

So-called basic duans for students with some years of experience.

1. Qingying—yi duan: Bronze/blue Eagle
2. Yinying—er duan: Silver Eagle
3. Jinying—san duan: Gold Eagle

Intermediate Level:

Middle-level duans are for wushu students/coaches who are able to teach and have between 5 and 10 years of wushu coaching experience, depending on level applied for. Starting from 5th Duan, there has to be proof of a scientific work in wushu research, i.e. publications, DVD, training of Duanwei examined students. Six Duanwei can use the title of Master as this is the highest technical grade.

4. Qinghu—si duan: Bronze/blue Tiger
5. Yinhu—wu duan: Silver Tiger
6. Jinhu—liu duan: Gold Tiger

Advanced Level:

Advanced level is only awarded to very experienced masters with excellent reputation in Wushu. The person awarded such a Duan is officially entitled to use the title "Grand Master".

7. Qinglong—qi duan: Bronze/blue Dragon
8. Yinlong—ba duan: Silver Dragon
9. Jinlong—jiu duan: Gold Dragon

The term Dan was used on the badges up to 2005 when the term Duan was adopted, however the term Dan was never used on the certificates of grade; the certificates always use the term Duanwei.

=== Korean martial arts ===
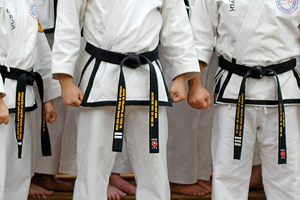
Some Korean martial art schools use embroidered bars to denote different dan ranks, as shown on the 1st, 2nd, and 3rd dan belts above.

Korean martial arts lacked a grading system up until the Japanese occupation (1910–1945) during which a variety of Japanese martial arts were introduced into the Korean school system, most notably judo, karate-do and kendo. After the occupation ended, newly emerging martial arts like taekwondo, tang soo do, soo bahk do and hapkido adopted the dan (단, 段) and geup (급, 級) ranks. The dan rank system is also used by baduk players. Nowadays, the Korea Taekkyon Association also issues dan ranks to taekkyeon practitioners.

Someone who has received a dan rank is called a yudanja (유단자, 有段者). Someone who has received a "high" dan rank (6th Dan upwards) is called a godanja (고단자, 高段者).

In some Korean schools, most notably in Kukkiwon-style Taekwondo, there is also a poom system in place (품, 品; "pum" using standard Romanization). Practitioners who have not yet reached the age of 15 cannot test for a dan rank. For them, there is a system of four poom grades. After they reach the age of 15, their poom-grade can be changed to the corresponding "dan"-grade.

==== Ranks in Korean ====
When numbering the dan ranks, Sino-Korean numbers are used. Common names for the dan ranks are thus:

Degree	English Pronunciation	Hangul	Hanja
1st degree	Il dan (also known as cho dan))	일단 or 초단	一段 or 初段
2nd degree	I dan	이단	二段
3rd degree	Sam dan	삼단	三段
4th degree	Sa dan	사단	四段
5th degree	O dan	오단	五段
6th degree	Yuk dan	육단	六段
7th degree	Chil dan	칠단	七段
8th degree	Pal dan	팔단	八段
9th degree	Gu dan	구단	九段
10th degree	Sip dan†	십단	十段

†For most Korean martial arts, the dan ranks do not go past ninth dan, although on some occasions in some organizations, a tenth dan has been issued.

=== Dan rank politics in the martial arts ===
Political tensions having to do with status and rank, predate the introduction of the Dan grading system by centuries. However, the introduction of the Dan ranks has led to the creation of new and specific types of 'rank politics' and social conflicts, which sometimes afflict martial arts schools and organizations. The topics associated with such challenges include, but are not limited to:

- Disagreements over who deserves each Dan rank, and why.
- Disagreements over the standards which merit the promotion to specific Dan ranks.
- The application of Nepotism to rank promotions.
- Other favouritism associated with rank promotions.
- The debate over whether 'honorary Dan ranks' are acceptable or not.
- The differences between Dan rank standards in different martial arts and schools.
- The number of Dan ranks used (usually 10, but on occasion there might be 12, 15 or even more).
- The question on which Dan rank could award other, lower Dan ranks.
- The promotion of children and teenagers to Dan ranks.

== See also ==
- Judo ranks and grading
- Kendo grades and titles
- Karate ranks
- Kyūdō ranks
- Taekwondo ranks, belts and promotion
- Brazilian jiu-jitsu ranking system
- Aikido uniforms and rankings
