= Shodan (rank) =

Lowest black belt rank in Japanese martial arts

Japanese name
- Kanji: 初段
- Hiragana: しょだん
Transcriptions
- Revised Hepburn: shodan
- Kunrei-shiki: syodan

Shodan (初段), literally meaning "beginning degree", is the lowest black belt rank in Japanese martial arts and the game of Go. The 2nd dan is higher than Shodan, but the 1st dan is called Shodan traditionally and not "Ichidan". This is because the character 初 (sho, alternative pronunciation: hatsu) also means first, new or beginning in Japanese.

Also frequently referred to as "first dan", it is a part of the kyū/dan ranking system common to modern Japanese martial arts. The term may be used to describe both the rank a person holds, as well as the person (i.e., it is proper to say that a person holds the rank of shodan, and it is also appropriate to say, "I am a shodan in 'x' martial art").
