= Robert Heisner =

American minister and martial artist

Robert F. Heisner
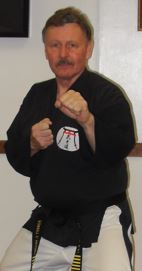
- Born: August 29, 1946; Niagara Falls, NY
- Died: March 7, 2024 (aged 77); Niagara Falls
- Style: Bushido Kai Karate, Shotokan, Aikijitsu, Bojutsu, Itosu Ryu, Kyokushin, Wado Ryu, and Tae Kwon-Do
- Teachers: Nara Tominoshi, Hisao Hotta, Kaicho Tadashi Nakamura, Shihan Oyama, Hironori Otsuka, Jiro Otsuka, Cecil T. Patterson, and Park Jong Soo,
- Rank: 9th dan

Robert Franklin Heisner (August 29, 1946 – March 7, 2024) was an American minister and martial artist who established a martial arts ministry. He achieved black belts in multiple disciplines and created a style of martial art which he named Bushido Kai.

Heisner was born in Niagara Falls, New York, where he spent most of his life. He served in Hokkaido, Japan during the Vietnam War. He worked in security before going into the ministry full time and also managed martial arts schools and taught at Niagara County Community College.

== Early life and education ==
Robert Heisner was born in Niagara Falls, NY, to Franklin and Arlene Heisner. His father was a World War II veteran of the Army. In 1940, Franklin and Arlene moved to Niagara Falls, NY from Hazleton, PA, where Robert and his younger brother, Barry, were born.

As a student, Heisner participated in baseball and weightlifting. At the age of 15, he developed a keen interest in martial arts.

Heisner graduated from Niagara Falls High School in June of 1964.

He studied the Bible and ministry at Elim Bible Institute and College and held ordination credentials with Elim Fellowship. At the age of eighteen, Heisner enlisted in the military and was stationed in Hokkaido, Japan, during the Vietnam War, where he further developed his interest in martial arts.

== Career ==
Early in his career, Heisner worked in security, including working as a bodyguard for Elvis Presley during his performance at the Niagara Falls Convention and Civic Center on July 13, 1975. In addition to his security work, he trained law enforcement officers from both the United States and Canada.

Before entering full-time ministry, Heisner managed commercial martial arts schools and taught at Niagara County Community College. He was incorporated under the oversight of Park Jong Soo in Toronto, Ontario, Canada. Heisner held black belts in multiple martial arts disciplines. He frequently provided pulpit supply for other ministers. Heisner combined his martial arts training in his evangelistic efforts.

Heisner worked with youth to provide training in martial arts, weightlifting, aerobics, as part of his ministry.

== Pastoral work ==
Heisner regularly performed funeral services, counseling, and wedding officiation.

== Martial arts ==
Heisner began his martial arts training around 1961. He continued to develop his skills while stationed in Hokkaido, Japan, during his service in the United States Army from 1965 to 1967. Heisner remained a lifelong student of martial arts. Heisner represented Park Jong Soo in various tournaments and oversaw his Tae Kwon-Do schools in Western New York.

Heisner taught martial arts in Western New York. In 1970, he was teaching Wado Ryu karate under Hironori Otsuka. The mayor of Niagara Falls, NY, requested Heisner to present Otsuka with the Keys to the City. A few years later, Heisner incorporated and opened Tae Kwon-Do schools in the region. He represented Park Jong Soo in the Buffalo and Niagara Falls regions. Heisner established a style of karate he called Bushido Kai in late 1989. This martial arts discipline was developed from various styles in which Heisner trained.

Style	Instructor	Earned Rank	Training Location
Shotokan Karate	Master Nara Tominoshi	Shodan (First Degree) Black Belt	Hokkaido, Japan
Aiki-Jitsu	Master Nara Tominoshi	Shodan (First Degree) Black Belt	Hokkaido, Japan
Bo-Jitsu	Master Nara Tominoshi	Certified Instructor	Hokkaido, Japan
Itosu Ryu Karate	Master Hisao Hotta	Nidan (Second Degree) Black Belt	Hokkaido, Japan
Kyokushin Kai Karate	Master Kaicho Tadashi Nakamura and Shihan Oyama	Recognized as a Shodan (First Degree) Black Belt	Brooklyn, NY Bridgeport, CT
Wado Ryu Karate	Shihan Hironori Otsuka Mr. Cecil T. Patterson	Nidan (Second Degree) Black Belt	Nashville, TN
Tae Kwon-Do	Master Park Jong Soo	Chil dan (Seventh Degree) Black Belt	Toronto, Ontario, Canada

Heisner was awarded his Eighth and Ninth Degree Black Belts in Bushido Kai. He was also recognized as a Ninth Degree Black Belt by the Professional Martial Arts Educators Association. Heisner trained many martial artists.

=== Bushido Kai ===
Heisner founded the Bushido Kai martial arts system and the Warriors of the Sword ministries. Heisner co-authored a book on it, "The Definitive History of Bushido Kai," which outlines the founding of the Bushido Kai karate system. He wrote the training manual for this system.

== Personal life and death ==
Heisner married Marianne Murdock in 1965. The couple had one daughter, Stacey. Heisner died March 7, 2024.
