= Kyutaro Kanda =

Japanese judoka (1897–1977)

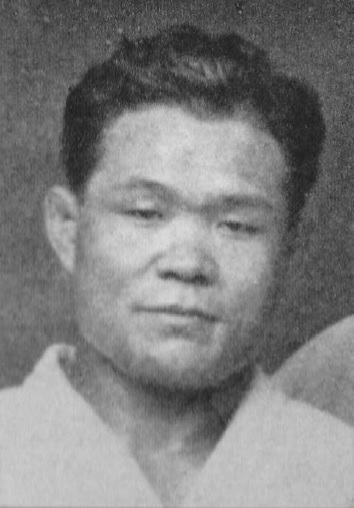
- Born: Kyutaro Kanda; December 20, 1897; Fukushima, Fukushima Prefecture, Japan
- Died: June 15, 1977 (aged 79); Soma, Fukushima Prefecture, Japan
- Native name: 神田久太郎
- Style: Judo; Yoshin-ryu jujutsu
- Teachers: Minematsu Watanabe; Kinsaku Yamamoto; Kyuzo Mifune
- Rank: Judo: 9th Dan

Kyutaro Kanda (神田久太郎, Kanda Kyūtarō; December 20, 1897 – June 15, 1977) was a Japanese judoka.

== Biography ==
Kanda initiated his judo training with Minematsu Watanabe in the Kodokan dojo in Aramachi, Fukushima, later moving to the local branch of the Dai Nippon Butoku Kai. After moving to Tokyo, he also started to train Yoshin-ryu jujutsu under Kinsaku Yamamoto, a former apprentice to Hikosuke Totsuka. Kanda became interested in re-joining the Kodokan at the same time, but he was barred from joining due to Yamamoto disapproving of their training methods, despite the fact that his own son Noboru Yamamoto was at the Kodokan at the time. To compensate it, Kanda instead joined the dojo of 2nd dan judoka Tami Minegawa.

Kanda went to serve five years of military service in Russia, and upon his return in 1923, with Yamamoto's death, he could finally become a Kodokan member. He was put under Kyuzo Mifune, and thanks to his talent and extensive previous training in jujutsu, he earned his 4th dan by 1926.

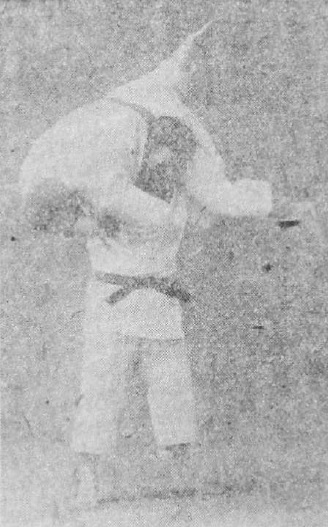
Kanda demonstrating kata guruma.

Kanda was a highly innovative judoka, who assisted with in the development of several techniques. Due to his tenure in jujutsu schools that allowed matches to start from the ground, he was a master of newaza, where he was an early proponent of kuzure kami shiho gatame, and favored more complex moves of his invention, including an original pin baptized as kuzure yoko shiho tai gatame (崩横四方帯固) and a combination of waki gatame and chokehold named waki gatame jime (脇固絞).

However, he was much more known by his unorthodox tachi waza, which he was forced to develop in order to keep pace with the Kodokan experts. He was initially a specialist of tomoe nage and kata guruma, but decided to focus solely on the latter due to it being a rare technique few judoka knew how to counter. He perfected it with Jigoro Kano himself and Mifune, the Kodokan's best connoisseurs of the move, and after three years he was an expert himself.

Since his jujutsu days, Kanda was also skilled with morote gari and kuchiki taoshi, at the time both of them collectively known as "kuchiki taoshi", which he had learned from his master Yamamoto in order to defeat bigger and heavier opponents. Fearing senior judokas would consider them unskilled techniques, in 1926 he came up with the name "morote gari" for said variation and consulted with Kano whether it should be a judo move. Kano asked him to demonstrate it in sparring, and after Kanda defeated multiple judoka with it, Kano declared morote gari an official move to be taught. Kuchiki taoshi was also made it official afterwards.

In 1930, after some years working primarily as a trainer and earning his 6th dan, Kanda applied for the national judo championship sponsored by The Asahi Shimbun, winning the qualifier tournament and reaching the finals of the championship, where he squared against former sumo wrestler and fellow 6th dan Kinsuke Sudo. The bout, refereed by Yoshitsugu Yamashita and hosted under heavy rain at the Meiji Jingu Gaien Stadium, saw Sudo repeatedly seeking to land uchi mata, with Kanda countering by seeking okuri eri jime and other submissions by gaining his back. Kanda came back with his signature kata guruma and launched a morote gari attempt, but at the last second Sudo reversed him with tawara gaeshi that threw Kanda two meters behind him, although failing to get the ippon due to getting out of the area. At the end, Kanda lost by judge decision, but the match would come to be considered one of the greatest judo matches of the Shōwa era.

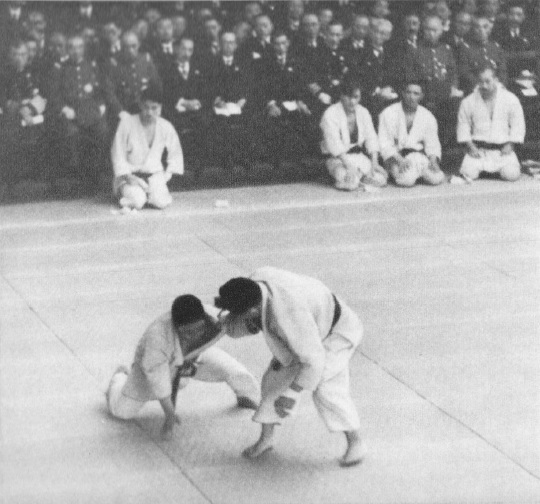
Kanda (right) against Otani (left) during their 1930 bout.

Hoping to avenge his defeat, Kanda applied for the 1931 championship, but he found out Sudo had opted out of the tournament. Kanda remained, however, and went to win the championship after beating Bunzo Nakanishi by kata gatame, Takeshi Aoki by kuzure kami shiho gatame and Sadakichi Takahashi by kata guruma.

In 1934, he was the oldest of the sixteen judoka chosen to participate at the Showa Tenrain-jiai event to celebrate the birth of prince Akihito. In the preliminary round, he fought a round robin match against Kanbei Furusawa, Yoshio Ochi and Kunijiro Minagawa, defeating all three of them and advancing to the final round. Here Kanda faced Masanobu Yamamoto, a former understudy of the famed Mataemon Tanabe, and defeated him by an uchi mata transitioned into a kata guruma. The very final bout pitted Kanda against the nine years younger Akira Otani, another former sumotori whose throwing mastery compared enough with Kanda's ground skills for the bout to be nicknamed "Otani on his feet, Kanda lying down" ("立って大谷、寝て神田"). After a failed kata guruma attempt, Kanda went then for tomoe nage, which he transitioned into an attempt to drag Otani down by the legs, but referee Hajime Isogai stopped the match at that point, trouncing his advance. Kanda persistently pursued kata guruma three more times, but Otani survived and landed an ippon seoi nage for the win. Again, the match was considered a highlight of the event.

Kanda finally got his chance to redeem himself against his old rival Kinsaku Sudo at the 6th All Japan Championship in 1936. Meeting him at the finals after eliminating Aizo Takimoto by kata guruma, Kanda defeated Sudo by kuchiki taoshi, winning his second championship and avenging his defeat.

Having reached the 9th dan, Kanda died of lung cancer in 1977.
