= Morote gari =

Judo technique

- Animation of a Morote-gari throw in Judo.
- Classification: Nage-waza
- Sub classification: Te-waza
- Targets: Legs
- Counter: Tawara gaeshi
- Kodokan: Yes

Technique name
- Rōmaji: Morote-gari
- Japanese: 双手刈
- English: Two-hand reap

Morote gari (双手刈) is a double leg takedown adopted later by the Kodokan into their Shinmeisho-no-waza (newly accepted techniques) list. It is categorized as a hand technique, te waza. It is not currently allowed in IJF competitions due to the ban on leg grabs ("no touching below the belt" rule) which has been in place in various forms since the 80s.

Morote gari was initially known as kuchiki taoshi, both moves being considered one and the same in most jujutsu schools. Kyutaro Kanda gave it its current name after it was made official in the Kodokan.

== Variations ==
Whereas morote gari is a frontal attack, The Canon Of Judo describes soto morote as a hanmi-irimi technique, where tori is on uke's side.
