= Seiji Nishimura =

Japanese karateka (born 1956)

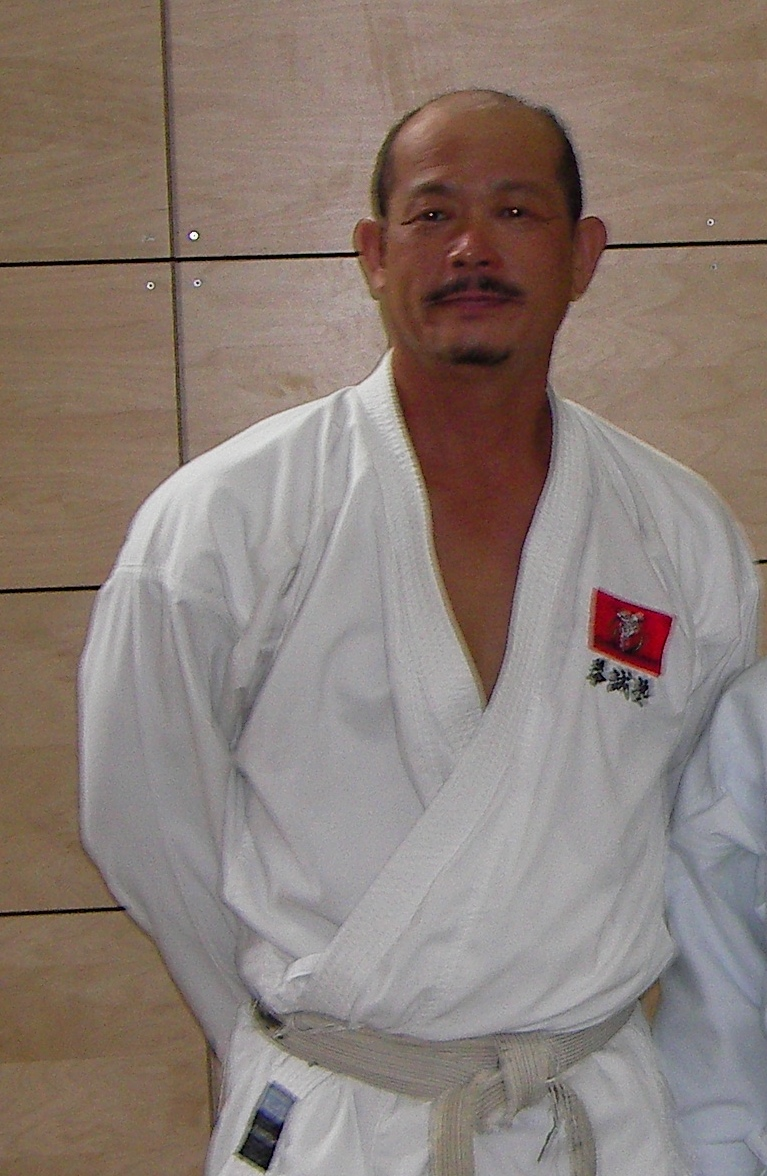
- Born: June 9, 1956 (age 70); Kumamoto Prefecture, Japan
- Style: Wadō-ryū Karate
- Teacher: Hironori Ōtsuka
- Rank: 7th dan karate

Other information
- Website: www.karatedo.co.jp/seiji-nishimura/

Seiji Nishimura (西村誠司, Nishimura Seiji; born June 9, 1956), Kumamoto Prefecture, Japan) he is a Japanese karateka. He has a 7th.Dan black belt in Wadō-ryū karate and is the national trainer of the Japan Karatedo Federation (JKF).

== Life ==
Born and grew up in the Kumamoto Prefecture, Seiji Nishimura began karate training at the age of 15 years. In 1982, Nishimura won the WKF World Championship in Kumite.

Nishimura began to train the Japanese Karate national team after his active competition career; In 15 years as coach of the national team, he has helped numerous Karateka through his training methods and his experience to international success: for example, Manabu Takenouchi won the national championships in Kumite under Nishimura 1994.

Since 2016, Nishimura has been senior director of JKF Wadokai.

== Various ==
Seiji Nishimura also practices the Gōjū-ryū as well as the Kushin-ryu-style in addition to Wadōkai. He himself, however, prefer the Wadō style because of its technical variety and efficiency. Nishimura teaches in his own Dojo as well as at the Fukuoka University. He also teaches seminars throughout Japan and abroad; He is a regular guest at the annual karate summer camp in Ravensburg and the biggest karate summer camp in Austria in Neuhofen an der Krems.

== Achievements ==
- 1980 35th Japan National Sports Festival Middle weight division Gold Medal
- 1981 1st World Games 70 kg Bronze Medal
- 1981 9th Japan Karate-do Championship Gold Medal
- 1982 6th Karate World Championships 70 kg Gold Medal
- 1982 18th Wado-kai Japan Karate-do Championship Silver Medal
- 1983 1st Karate Open de Paris 70 kg Gold Medal
- 1983 19th Wado-kai Japan Karate-do Championship Gold Medal
- 1983 38th Japan National Sports Festival Open division Gold Medal
- 1983 5th Asia Pacific Karate Championships 70 kg & Open division Gold Medals
- 1983 11th Japan Karate-do Championship Silver Medal
- 1984 1st IBUSZ World Cup 70 kg Gold Medal
- 1984 20th Wado-kai Japan Karate-do Championship Gold Medal
- 1985 2nd Karate Open de Paris 70 kg Gold Medal
- 1985 21st Wado-kai Japan Karate-do Championship Gold Medal
- 1985 6th Asia Pacific Karate Championships Open division Gold Medal
- 1986 22nd Wado-kai Japan Karate-do Championship Gold Medal
- 1987 23rd Wado-ka Japan Karate-do Championship Gold Medal
- 1987 7th Asia Pacific Karate Championships 70 kg Gold Medal
- 1987 15th Japan Karate-do Championship Gold Medal
