= Wadōkai =

Organization within the Japan Karate Federation

Wado kai (和道会, Wadō kai) is the organization within the Japan Karate Federation (JKF) which practices the Wadō-ryū style of karate. Wado kai has numerous associated organizations and member clubs on different continents of the world.

== History ==
In 1938, Hironori Ohtsuka registered his mixed style of karate-jujutsu with the Dai Nippon Butoku Kai, originally under the name of Shinshu Wadoryu Karate-Jujutsu, soon shortened to Wado-ryu (和道流). A Wadoryu Honbu (headquarters) was established in the Meiji University dojo in Tokyo, Japan in 1952. The Shintani Wado Kai Karate Federation of North America officially joined Otsuka's federation in 1958. In 1964, the Japan Karatedo Federation (JKF) was established as a general organization for all karate styles. Wado joined this organization as a major group. The Wado organization changed the name to Wadokai on 5 June 1967.

On 15 November 1979, Hironori Otsuka promoted Masaru Shintani to 8th dan, and presented him with a 9th dan certificate for later use. Shintani died in 2000.

Wadokai remained relatively intact as an organisation until around 1980, when a split occurred. The split occurred because the Wadokai board of directors and Hironori Ohtsuka had a difference in opinion about monetary expenditures and accessibility to the funds of the organization. Ohtsuka felt it was within his rights to have full use of the Federation funds and one day made a withdrawal that drew the ire of the board of directors. This matter was settled out of court and the terms of the settlement allowed him to keep the money but he had to resign from Wadokai and he also lost all rights to the name and logo of the organization. Eiichi Eriguchi succeeded him within Wadokai at that time and again became chairman during the 1990s. Hironori Ohtsuka then founded Wadoryu Karatedo Renmei (Renmei means 'group' or 'federation') on 1 April 1981. After only a few months Hironori Ohtsuka retired as head of this organization and his son Jiro Ohtsuka took his place. Hironori Ohtsuka died 29 January 1982 at the age of 89. In 1983, Jiro Ohtsuka became Grandmaster of Wado Ryu and changed his name to Hironori Ohtsuka II, in honor of his father. Following Jiro's death in 2015, he succeeded his son Kazutaka, who is now referred to as Hironori Ohtsuka III.

Tatsuo Suzuki founded his own organization in 1991, the third major Wado organization: Wado Kokusai, also known as the WIKF. Kokusai means 'international.' Suzuki was succeeded in 2012 by Jon Wicks.

== Organization's name ==
According to Ishizuka Akira, a veteran figure in the Japanese karate world, the term Wado Kai was in general use as early as the 1940s, but it was only in 1967 that the name was adopted formally. Prior to this the group was known as the Zen Nihon Karate-do Renmei. With the formation of the Federation of All Japan Karatedo Organization (FAJKO, later changed to JKF) in the mid 60's, it was no longer correct to use this name so Wadokai came into formal use.

The term Wadokai can be broken into three parts: Wa, do and kai. Wa can be read to mean 'harmony' but also as "original Japan", allowing a pun in the name. Do is a Japanese term for 'way' (as in karate-do). So Wado means 'the way of (Japanese) harmony'. Kai simply means 'association'.

=== Different Wado names ===
The full name of the Japanese Wadokai federation in English is Japan Karatedo Federation Wadokai. In Japanese it is Zen Nihon Karatedo Renmei Wadokai.

Nowadays the full name of Wadoryu is Wadoryu Karatedo Renmei.

The full name of Wado Kokusai is Wado Kokusai Karatedo Renmei, also known as Wado International Karatedo Federation abbreviated as WIKF.

Strictly speaking Hironori Ohtsuka founded and developed Wado Ryu. The people who trained with him became the Wado group or Wadokai. So today, the style that is trained within Wadokai is Wado Ryu. The Wadoryu Renmei people (Jiro Ohtsuka's group) sometimes referred their style as Wadoryu Jujutsu Kenpo to assert their emphasis in the Jujutsu roots of Wado.

Currently Wadokai and Wadoryu have spread to several other countries under the governing bodies in Japan. Several dojos have transitioned between the two associations with slight variations in the styles.
