= Tōru Arakawa =

Japanese karateka

- Born: 27 November 1932; Gifu Prefecture, Japan
- Died: 20 June 2015 (aged 82); Tokyo, Japan
- Style: Wadō-ryū Karate
- Teacher: Hironori Ōtsuka
- Rank: 9th dan karate hanshi

Tōru Arakawa (荒川通, Arakawa Tōru; November 1932 in Gifu Prefecture, Japan – 20 June 2015) was a karate master of the style Wadō-ryū. He was one of the few karateka ranked 9th Dan in Japan.

== Biography ==
Tōru Arakawa began karate training at the Nihon University at the age of 18. At the beginning of the 1960s he traveled to Europe and America together with Tatsuo Suzuki and Hajime Takashima to make karate in the western countries popular.

Arakawa served as the manager of the JKF Wadōkai from 1962 to 1979. In 1982, he played a major role in the creation of the first Shatai [Kata] book, which standardized Kata 's style – encompassing style for JKF competitions. In addition, he trained numerous successful athletes in the 1980s, including Seiji Nishimura and Toshiaki Maeda.

Until his death in June 2015, Arakawa taught in his Dōjō Shibuya and at international seminars in Japan and overseas.

== Participation in the following publications ==
- Karatedo Shitei Kata, 1982, JKF Wadokai
- Wado-kai Karatedo Textbook, Kata section (Vol. 1), 2015, JKF Wadokai
