= Ticky =

Ticky is a given name. Notable people with the name include:

- Ticky Donovan (born 1947), British karate competitor and coach
- Ticky Fullerton (born 1963), Australian journalist
- Ticky Holgado (1944–2004), French actor

== See also ==
- Luther Burden (1953–2015), basketball player
