= Steven Bellamy =

British martial artist (born 1950)

- British All-Styles Karate Team member - 1972
- Born: 12 June 1950 (age 75); Sheffield, England, (United Kingdom)
- Style: Jōdō, Iaido, Karate, Judo
- Teachers: Ichitaro Kuroda, Morio Higaonna, Isao Okano
- Rank: 10th dan karate 7th dan judo 7th dan aikido

Other information
- Notable students: Chisato Mishima

Steven John Bellamy (born 12 June 1950, in Sheffield, England) is a British martial artist, author, and lecturer.

Steve Bellamy's Musokan Dojo Kagami Biraki 2020 Nagoya Japan

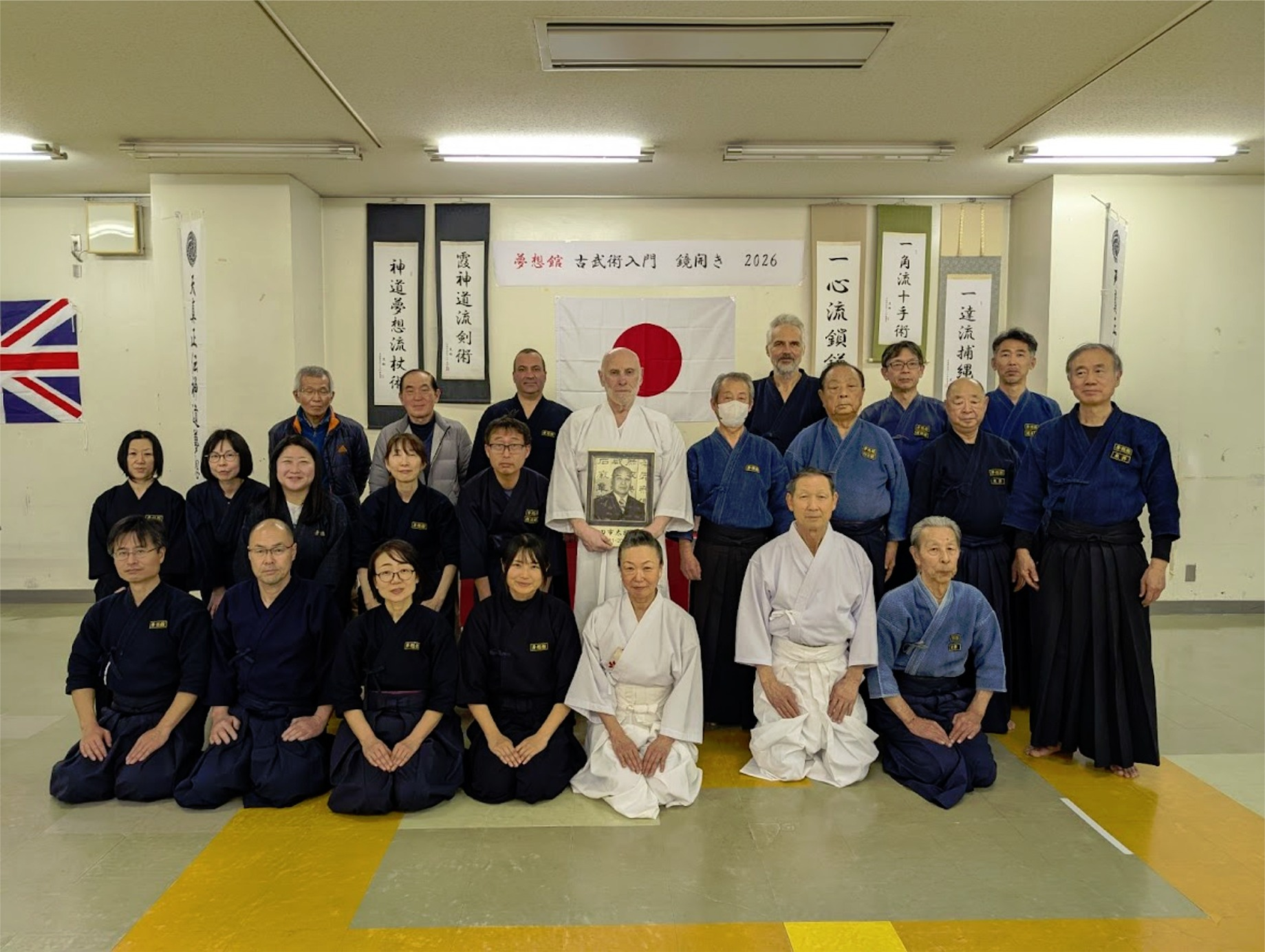
Steve Bellamy's Musokan Dojo Kagami Biraki 2026 Nagoya Japan

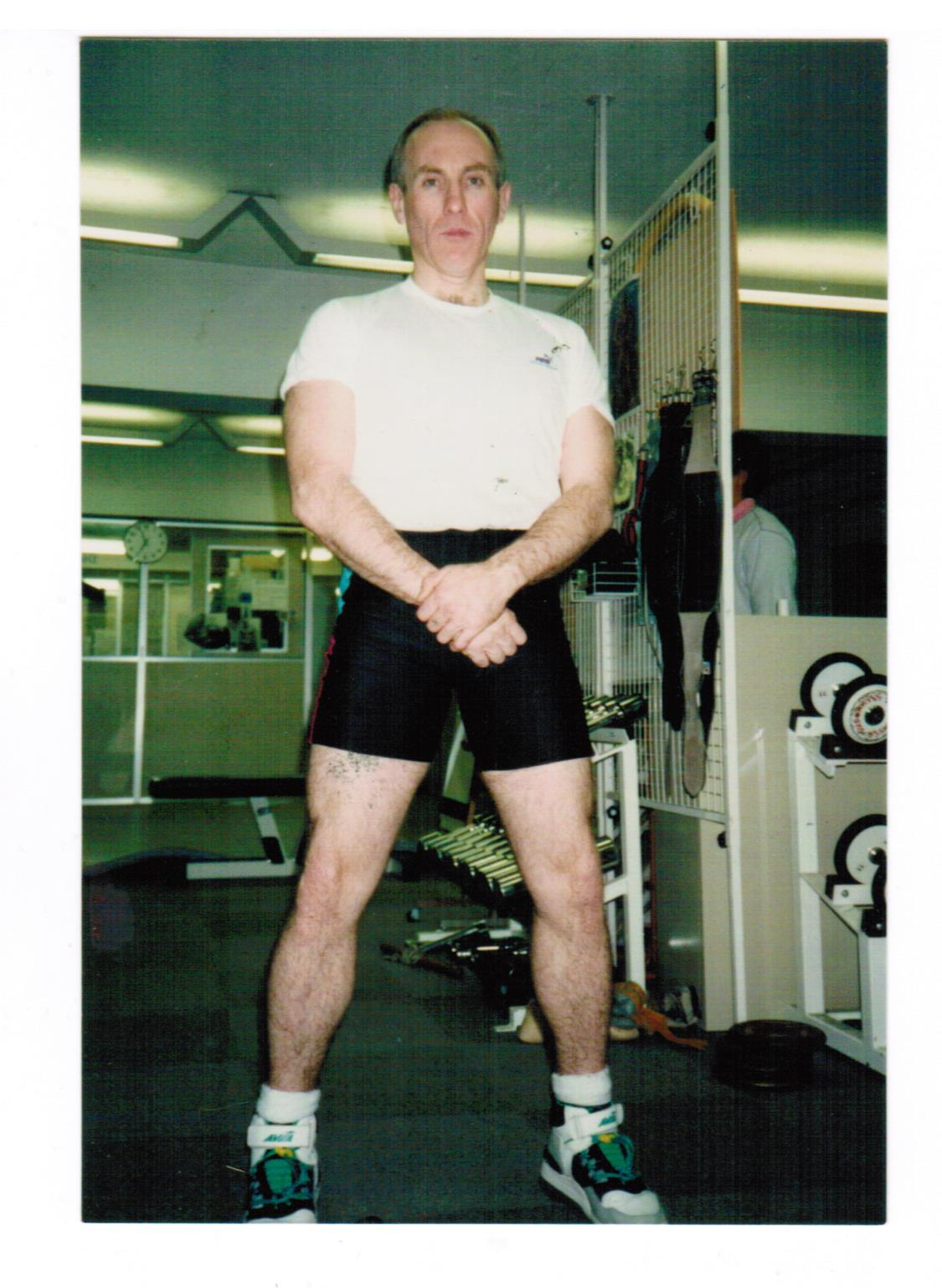
Winner 1996 Aerobics Championships and 1996 Ironman Triathlon

Final of Great Britain versus France - Crystal Palace - London

Final of Great Britain versus Japan - Liverpool, England

Final of British Championships - Sheffield, England

Hozanji Shrine - Fukuoka Jodo Honbu 1974

== Biography ==
Steve Bellamy practiced judo and boxing at school. He began studying karate in the early sixties, crediting the book Karate the Art of Empty Hand Fighting by Nishiyama and Brown as his inspirational source. His first formal lessons were in the Wadō-ryū style under Masafumi Shiomitsu later changing to Goju-ryu style under Brian Waites.

In the late sixties and seventies he won numerous national, European, and world titles in karate. He was a British All-Styles Karate Team member from 1970 to 1973. During 1974 to 1977, he won several full contact and kick-boxing titles in Japan and in the USA. He has lived and trained in Japan for more than 40 years.

In addition to instructor ranks in karate, jūdō and aikidō, he holds advanced teaching licenses in several classical martial arts of Japan, notably Shindō Muso-ryū Jodō, Musō Shinden ryū Iaido, and Kasumi Shindō-ryū Kenjutsu

He is a member of the Kansai Japanese language council (関西国語審議会) and has passed both the Japanese Language Proficiency Test (日本語能力試験) and the Japanese foreign service translators examination at level 1 (the highest).

He was made a freeman of the City of Sheffield in 1992.

In 1998 he was awarded a master's degree in Advanced Japanese Studies.

In July 2009 he was appointed to the Nihon Jodo Association (日本杖道協会) Board of Directors.

In September 2010 he was appointed to the All Japan Iaido Federation (全日本居合道連盟) Board of Examiners.

On 24 March 2013 he received 8th Dan and the title Shihan in Japanese calligraphy (Shodo)

On 12 June 2016 he was promoted to 9th dan Okinawan Goju Karate

On 12 June 2020 he was promoted to 10th dan Okinawan Goju Karate

== Training History ==
Steve Bellamy studied karate under:

- Tatsuo Suzuki and Masafumi Shiomitsu in Wadō-ryū
- Brian Waites, Steve Morris and Gary Spiers in the Gōjū Kai
- Morio Higaonna, Ei'ichi Miyazato and Koshin Iha in Okinawan Gōjū
- Kickboxing and Full Contact under Jeff Smith and Bill 'Superfoot' Wallace
- Wing Chun under Joseph Cheng (UK) and Leung Sheung (HK)
- His teacher and mentor in Japanese classical martial arts and in Japanese calligraphy for many years was Ichitaro Kuroda.

== Writings ==
- Traffic jams cause rain (1997)
- Sanchin: Your kata is killing you (2002)
- Kihon: Wasted time, wasted energy. What you don't do will make you better (2004)
- Fight Right (2005)
- Between two trees. The Shindo Muso Ryu of Kuroda Ichitaro (2006)

== Publications ==
- Menkyo : Principles and practice of classical Japanese arts, in English, Sanshidō Publishing, Tokyo (2007)
- 一角流教程 (Ikkaku Ryu Kyōtei) Training curriculum of the Ikkaku Ryu, in Japanese, Sanshidō Publishing, Tokyo (2008)

== Other notes ==
- Bellamy is an Ashtanga Yoga, TM meditation, and Neuro-linguistic programming instructor.
- Bellamy is an Iaido and Jōdō Instructor at the Kaori-jiku Kobudo Dojo in Osaka, Japan.

== See also ==
- Karate
- Goju ryu
- Shindo Muso-ryu Jodo
- Muso Shinden Ryu Iaido
- Ashtanga Yoga
