= Tatsuo Suzuki =

Tatsuo Suzuki may refer to:

- Tatsuo Suzuki (cinematographer) (鈴木 達夫, born 1935), Japanese cinematographer
- Tatsuo Suzuki (martial artist) (鈴木 達夫, 1928–2011), Japanese karateka
