= Park Jong-soo =

South Korean taekwondo practitioner (1941–2021)

- Born: 1941; Chūseinan-dō, Korea, Empire of Japan
- Died: 27 November 2021 (aged 79–80)
- Style: Taekwondo
- Teacher: Choi Hong-hi
- Rank: 9th dan taekwondo (ITF)

Other information
- Website: http://www.jongpark.com/

Park Jong-soo (1941 – 27 November 2021) was a South Korean master of taekwondo and one of the twelve original masters of taekwondo of the Korea Taekwon-Do Association. He held the rank of 9th dan. Following a career in the South Korean military, he emigrated to Canada in 1968.

== Early life ==
Park was born in Chūseinan-dō, Korea, Empire of Japan in 1941. He trained in taekwondo under Choi Hong-hi. In 1965, he was invited to be the coach of the German Taekwon-Do Association, and moved from South Korea to West Germany. Park was ranked 5th dan that year. The following year, he moved to the Netherlands and founded the Netherlands Taekwon-Do Association. Through the late 1960s and 1970s, Park was a key member of the taekwondo demonstration teams that accompanied Choi around the world.

== Canada ==
In 1968, Park settled in Toronto, Canada. In 1973, he held the rank of 7th dan. In 1974, Park and several other ITF masters demonstrated taekwondo in Toronto—then being promoted as "the new home of the ITF" by Choi. Park and Choi went their separate ways after Choi insisted on establishing relations with North Korea during a politically sensitive period. By 2002, however, they were reconciled, and Park was present at Choi's deathbed.

In 2004, Park was President of the Canadian Taekwon-Do Association, and presented a seminar in Afghanistan. In 2008, Park conducted a seminar in Beijing. He headed taekwondo schools in Toronto.

Park is listed as a pioneer in Canada (1950s, 1960s, and 1970s) in Choi Chang-keun's list of taekwondo pioneers.

== Filmography ==
Year	Title	Role	
1979	Search and Destroy	Assassin	IMDb
1985	The Park Is Mine	Tran Chan Dinh	IMDb TV Movie
1982	Seeing Things	Unnamed	IMDb TV Series - Park Jong Soo was in one episode in 1982

== Schools and Instructors Grand Master Park Influenced ==
- 1965, Park traveled with General Choi Hong Hi on a goodwill tour through Europe, Asia, and Africa promoting Tae Kwon Do
- 1965, during the above-mentioned tour, Park became the coach of the German Tae Kwon Do Association
- 1965, Georg F. Brückner invited Park to teach in his Berlin dojo
- Billy Blanks was a student of Grandmaster Park Jong Soo
- In the early 1970s, Park oversaw several Tae Kwon Do schools. Two were in Western New York and were operated by Robert Heisner

== See also ==
- List of taekwondo grandmasters
