= Joe Micon =

American politician (born 1958)

Member of the Indiana House of Representatives from the 26th district
- In office 2004–2008

Personal details
- Born: March 29, 1958 (age 68) Niagara Falls, New York, U.S.
- Party: Democratic
- Education: Niagara County Community College (AA); Purdue University (BA); Indiana University–Purdue University Indianapolis (MSW)

Joe Micon (born March 29, 1958) is an American politician who served as a member of the Indiana House of Representatives for the 26th district from 2004 to 2008.

== Early life and education ==
Micon was born in Niagara Falls, New York. After graduating from La Salle High School, he earned an Associate of Arts degree from Niagara County Community College, Bachelor of Arts in applied sociology from Purdue University, and Master of Social Work from Indiana University–Purdue University Indianapolis.

== Career ==
Micon served as a member of the Indiana House of Representatives from 2004 to 2008. He also worked for the Lafayette Urban Ministry for 40 years, including as the organization's executive director.
