= Takedown (grappling) =

Martial arts technique

- Usage of a leg trip to perform a takedown
- Style: Wrestling; Jujutsu; Judo; Muay Thai; Sambo; Mixed martial arts Sanda; Brazilian jiu-jitsu

In martial arts and combat sports, a takedown is a technique that involves off-balancing an opponent and bringing them to the ground with the attacker landing on top. The process of quickly advancing on an opponent and attempting a takedown is known as shooting for a takedown, or simply shooting.

In rulesets of many sports, such as judo and sambo, a well-executed throw will end the match (with the idea being that if the match did not happen on a tatami, the one who was thrown would be unable to stand back up) while the match will continue on the ground if a takedown is used instead. Takedowns are featured in all forms of wrestling and judo.

== Leg trip ==
The leg trip is a technique in which the combatant uses their own leg(s) to off-balance an opponent, hence causing the opponent to fall to the ground. Leg trips are often integrated into more complex takedown techniques, and are also important in many throws. Takedown techniques that are pure leg trips usually involve controlling the body of the opponent, and impeding or destabilizing one or both of the opponents legs. Leg trips are featured in for instance freestyle wrestling, judo, sumo, and shuai jiao while being an illegal technique in Greco-Roman wrestling.

The scissor kick takes down an opponent by wrapping one's legs around the opponent.

== Single leg takedown ==
A single leg takedown attempt

The single leg takedown (often shortened to single leg or single or single leg shot) involves grabbing one of the legs of the opponent, usually with both hands, and using the position to force the opponent to the ground. Typically, the lower part of the leg is pulled in one direction, while the torso or shoulder is used to press the body or upper part of the leg of the opponent in the other direction.

There are several varieties of single leg takedowns. Some involve picking up and holding the leg by the ankle and are often known as ankle picks, while other varieties include the high crotch, in which the leg is held high up in the opponent's crotch area. The leg can be attacked either across the body ("inside") or from away from the body ("outside"). Single leg takedowns can also be executed in combination with a leg trip to the other leg, which additionally destabilizes the opponent.

Single leg takedowns can be countered by sprawling or by hooking the lifted foot in the crotch of the aggressor (so it cannot be lifted further and to maintain a distance from the aggressor), and, where allowed, in combination with knee strikes to the head of the opponent.

In judo and other martial arts, there are many classifications of different types of single leg takedowns. Variants of the high crotch correspond to sukui nage (掬投, "scoop throw"), where the opponent is lifted up from the ground, while the typical forward pushing single leg takedown is classified as morote gari (双手刈, "both hands scoop"). Some techniques are more specific, for instance kibisu gaeshi (踵返, "heel trip reversal"), which is an ankle pick where the heel is grabbed, scooped up and the opponent is pushed and thrown immediately. In kuchiki taoshi (朽木落, "one hand drop"), the opponent's leg is grabbed, pulled up, and used to push the opponent down to the ground in a split second. The technique was banned in judo competition by the International Judo Federation in 2010 except as a counter or combination.

== Double leg takedown ==
A double leg takedown

The double leg takedown (colloquially known as a double leg or double) involves grabbing the opponent with both arms around the opponent's legs while keeping the chest close to the opponent, and using this position to force the opponent to the ground. It is primarily an offensive maneuver to force a quick choke. There are several varieties of forcing the opponent to the ground, such as lifting and slamming, or pushing forward with the shoulder while pulling the opponent's legs. The double leg takedown can be countered similarly to a single leg takedown, by sprawling, moving away, and/or striking. The guillotine choke is also a good counter to a poorly performed double leg takedown.

The double leg takedown is in judo also referred to as morote-gari, although some hold that a double leg takedown where the opponent is lifted into the air or swept sideways should be referred to as sukui-nage. Morote-gari, despite having been used by judokas for a very long time and being approved of by Jigoro Kano himself, was not accepted until 1982 by the Kodokan as an official judo technique. Being dismissed by certain traditionalists, the technique was banned in competition by the International Judo Federation in 2010 except as a counter or combination.

Another form of a double leg takedown is the double leg and trip, in which the person shoots in and while holding both legs swings one of his legs around and pushes forward on the opponent while tripping the opponent's leg out from under him.

== Duckunder ==
In a duckunder, the attacker pulls the opponent's elbow forward and away from the body, lowers his own head, and ducks under the opponent's arm in an effort to get behind or at least beside the opponent; from this position the opponent can be taken down by lifting and throwing or by a leg trip.

== Fireman's carry ==
The fireman's carry is a takedown technique that resembles a common method of carrying an injured victim by firefighters. When implemented on the right side of the opponent's body, the attacker's left hand pulls the opponent's right elbow forward so the attacker's head goes under the opponent's right arm. At the same time, the attacker's right hand grabs the inside of the opponent's right thigh and lifts, while the attacker rises and drives to his left, bringing the opponent down to the ground on his right side.

A variation performed by a cross body wrist-hold is called Kraft's Carry (Kraft coached by Wrestling's Hall of Fame Ned Blass, designed the move in 1967-70 achieving success as a high school and collegiate wrestler). The attacker can perform either a right or reverse carry (left) by reaching up to hold the opponents high right bicep with the left hand, while reaching across taking the opponent's right hand or wrist. This version is accomplished by “throwing” the opponents wrist aside to the left, while ducking under for the standard carry. Maximum points can be achieved by retaining the opponent's right arm on landing and moving into a pinning position with a head and arm.

== Underhook ==
A single underhook involves putting an arm under the opponent's arm, and holding the back of the opponent's midsection or upper body, while a double underhook involves doing this with both arms. Either can be used as the basis for a takedown because underhooks offer the potential for control of the opponent's upper body.

== Overhook ==
A single overhook, or whizzer, involves putting an arm over the opponent's arm and encircling it. It can be used as a takedown maneuver by putting substantial weight on the targeted arm while pulling the opponent's other arm across his body, and eventually stepping over behind the opponent.

== Bear hug ==
In a bear hug, the arms are wrapped tightly around the opponent's midsection, sometimes with one or both of the opponent's arms pinned to the opponent's body, so that the opponent's chest is held tightly to the attacker's chest. From this position the opponent can be taken down, sometimes by lifting and tilting and sometimes with the aid of a leg trip.

== Spin-around ==
The spin-around is often used as a counter to an opponent's attempt at a single- or double-leg takedown. When the opponent shoots for the legs, the targeted wrestler sprawls his legs part way back and then quickly moves around behind the opponent.

=== Snapdown ===
In a snapdown, both hands are placed on the back of the opponent's neck, and when the opponent's head is held low or is becoming lower both hands pull down sharply, propelling the opponent's head and therefore body toward the ground. Simultaneously the attacker steps around behind the opponent.
