= Kunisaburo Iizuka =

Japanese judoka (1875–1958)

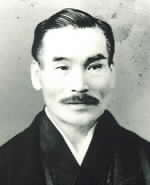
- Kunisaburo Iizuka

Personal information
- Born: 13 February 1875
- Died: 25 July 1958 (aged 83)
- Occupation: Judoka

Sport
- Sport: Judo
- Rank: 10th dan black belt

Kunisaburo Iizuka (飯塚 国三郎, Iizuka Kunisaburō; July 13, 1875 – July 25, 1958) was a Japanese judoka and the fifth person to be promoted to 10th dan in Kodokan judo.

Iizuka started judo training at Keio Gijuku in 1889, but broke off his training the following year to attend naval academy in Tokyo. Although the academy had no judo club, Iizuka saw a man carrying a judogi one day, and followed him to the Kodokan; he enrolled as a student there in November, 1891.

In 1906, Iizuka returned to Keio to take a job as judo coach to Keio University, where he taught Kaname Kuniyuki, Chuji Sakata and Yoshio Sugino, among others.

He was one of the first of Jigoro Kano's students to be awarded a judan (10th-dan) ranking, in 1946.

As well as teaching judo, Iizuka was also an ordained negi (Shinto priest) at Fukuoka Prefectural Shuyukan Senior High School, and was master of the Imperial Fisheries Institute.
