= Yoshio Sugino =

Japanese martial artist (1904-1998)

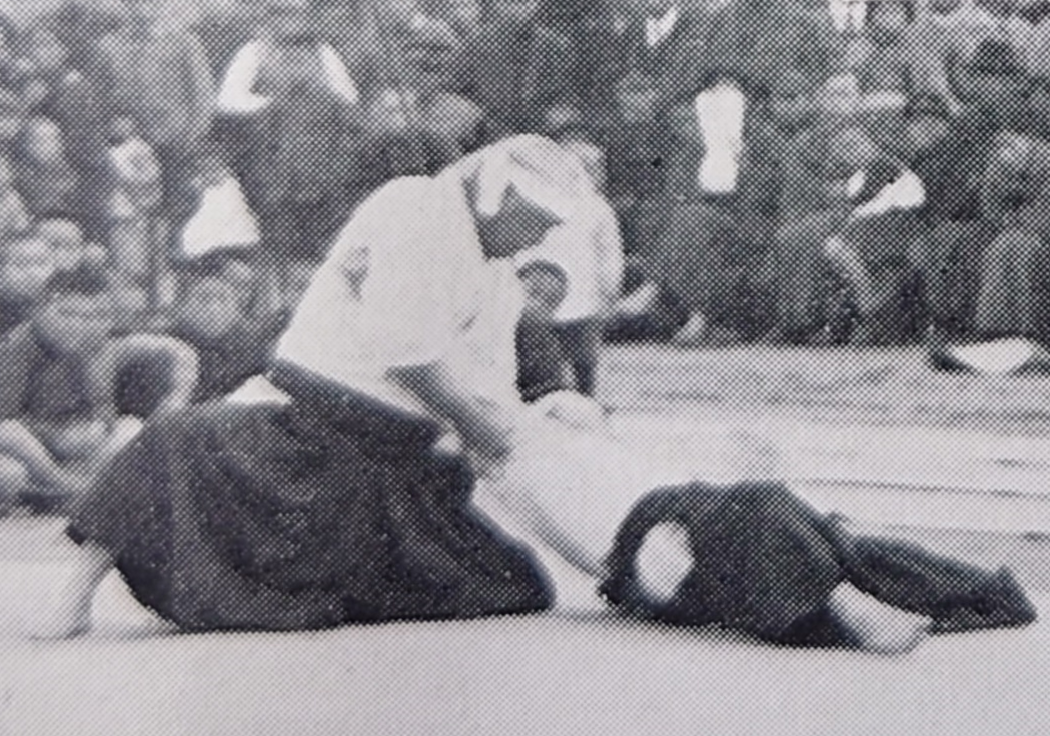
- Sugino in his dojo
- Born: December 12, 1904; Tokyo, Japan
- Died: June 13, 1998 (aged 93); Narutō, Chiba, Japan
- Style: Tenshin Shoden Katori Shinto Ryu, Judo, Aikido
- Teachers: Kunisaburo Iizuka, Morihei Ueshiba, Kano Jigoro Shihan

Other information
- Children: 1

Yoshio Sugino (杉野嘉男, Sugino Yoshio; December 12, 1904 – June 13, 1998) was a Japanese martial artist and film choreographer.

== Early life ==
Sugino was born in Naruto village, Chiba prefecture, in December 1904. When he was a child, his family moved to Tokyo. He first encountered martial arts at Keio University, where he enrolled in 1918; here he joined the judo, kendo, sumo and kyūdō clubs, among others. In particular, he studied judo under Kunisaburo Iizuka, one of Japan's top collegiate coaches at the time. Discovering a proficiency for judo, he started his own dojo (the Kodokan Judo Shugyojo) in Kawasaki after a brief stint as a bank clerk.

== Martial arts career ==
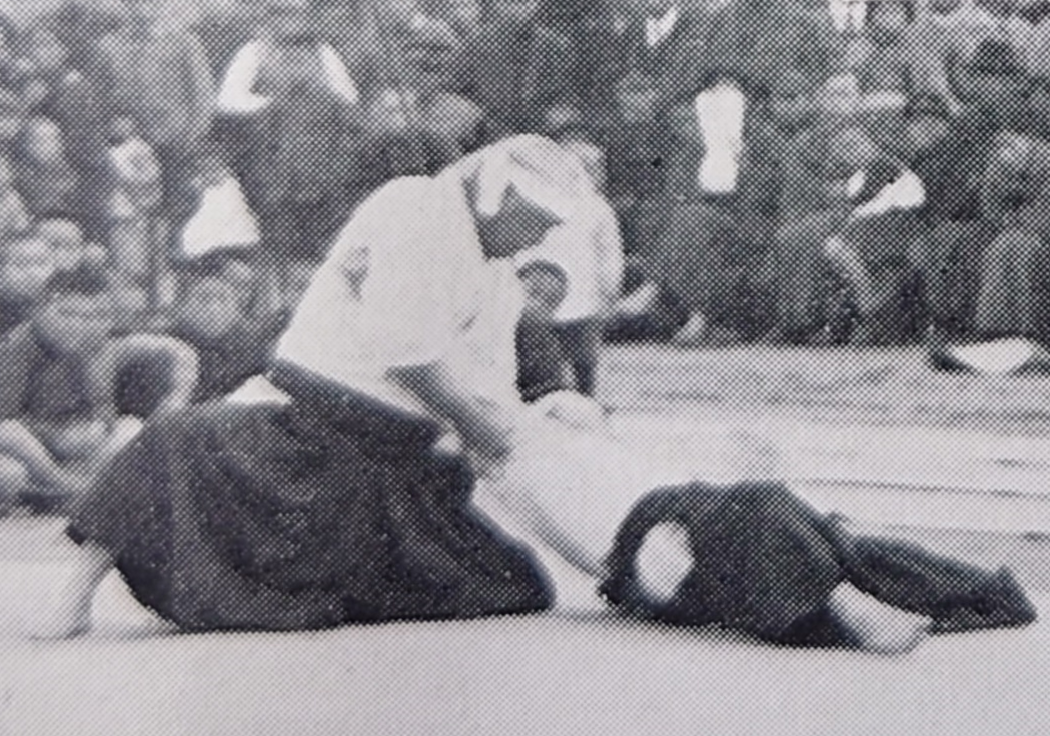
Sugino (right) in a Yoshin-ryu exhibition against Motojuro Kanaya (left).

Jigoro Kano, the founder of judo, introduced Sugino to the Katori Shinto-ryu school of kenjutsu in 1927. Sugino also started studying Yoshin Koryu under Genro Kanaya around this time. He met aikido's founder Morihei Ueshiba in the early 1930s, and studied aikido sufficiently to gain a teaching license and open an Aikikai-affiliated dojo by 1935. By the 1940s he was teaching kenjutsu, aikido, judo and naginatajutsu full-time.

== Move to Fukushima ==
During World War II, Sugino's home and dojo were destroyed by bombing raids on Kawasaki. Sugino and his family fled to Fukushima, where he spent most of his time in martial arts training and used his medical knowledge (he had run a bone-setting clinic from his dojo in Kawasaki) to help the injured. After the war, the family returned to Kawasaki, where his clinic became very busy treating the war-wounded. By 1950, he had constructed a new dojo.

== Film career ==
In 1953, Sugino was asked to provide sword instruction for the actors in Akira Kurosawa's film, Seven Samurai. Originally the work was shared between Sugino and Junzo Sasamori of the Ono-ha Itto-ryu, but Sasamori pulled out early in the filming due to teaching commitments abroad. Sugino is also credited as fencing instructor for Kurosawa's "Hidden Fortress" and "Yojimbo". His choreography for the fights departed from earlier, Kabuki-influenced work and focused on making the scenes as realistic as possible. Furthermore, Sugino also did the choreography for Hiroshi Inagaki's Samurai Trilogy.
