= SUNY Niagara =

Public college in Sanborn, New York, US

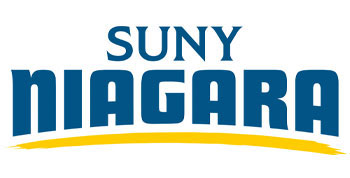
- Former name: Niagara County Community College (1962–2024)
- Motto: The Smart Place to Start
- Type: Public community college
- Established: November 8, 1962; 63 years ago
- Parent institution: State University of New York
- Affiliations: National Junior College Athletic Association
- President: Lloyd A. Holmes
- Undergraduates: 4,785 (fall 2025)
- Location: Sanborn, New York, United States; 43.145963°N 78.878660°W
- Campus: Suburban 287 acres (1.16 km^{2})
- Colors: Navy blue and yellow
- Nickname: Thunderwolves
- Mascot: Tripp the Thunderwolf
- Website: sunyniagara.edu

SUNY Niagara (formerly Niagara County Community College, or NCCC) is a public community college in Sanborn, New York. Founded in 1962, SUNY Niagara is sponsored by Niagara County and offers associate degrees as part of the State University of New York system. Dual admissions programs facilitate transfer to four-year colleges upon completion of the two-year degree programs.

SUNY Niagara operates the Niagara Falls Culinary Institute as a remote campus within the former Rainbow Centre Factory Outlet in downtown Niagara Falls, New York.

== History ==
Niagara County Community College's first campus opened on September 30, 1963 within a former Nabisco factory at 430 Buffalo Avenue in downtown Niagara Falls, New York.

The current campus opened on February 5, 1973 at the corner of New York State Route 31 and New York State Route 429 in the suburban community of Sanborn, New York. It was built on 287 acres (1.16 km^{2}) of semi-wooded land, with eight interconnected buildings:

- Ernest Notar Administration (Building A)
- Business (Building B)
- Science (Building C)
- Henrietta G. Lewis Library (Building D)
- Humanities & Social Sciences (Building E)
- Arts & Media (Building F)
- Student Center (Building G)
- Athletics (Building H)

The school's library was named in honor of philanthropist Henrietta Grigg-Lewis on November 15, 2005 after her foundation donated $1 million for modernizing the facility.

On August 29, 2008, the college opened its first student housing complex featuring suite style units for 308 students.

The school's Niagara Falls Culinary Institute opened on September 28, 2012 within the former Rainbow Centre Factory Outlet in downtown Niagara Falls, New York.

In February 2024, the school changed its name from Niagara County Community College to SUNY Niagara.

== Presidents ==
- Ernest Notar, 1963–1975
- Jack C. Watson, 1975–1979
- Donald J. Donato, 1979–1989
- Gerald L. Miller, 1989–1999
- Antonette Cleveland, 1999–2002
- James P. Klyczek, 2002–2017
- William J. Murabito, 2017–2024
- Lloyd A. Holmes, 2024–present

== Athletics ==
SUNY Niagara athletic teams were first known as the Frontiersmen from 1962–1984, and then the Trailblazers from 1984–2010. They became the Thunderwolves in 2010, along with the introduction of mascot Tripp the Thunderwolf.

Eric Knuutila has coached wrestling at the college since 1973, producing four national champions including Rashad Evans.

The 1977–78 men's basketball team fell one game shy of a perfect season after losing the 1978 NJCAA Men's Division I Basketball Championship.

== Notable people ==
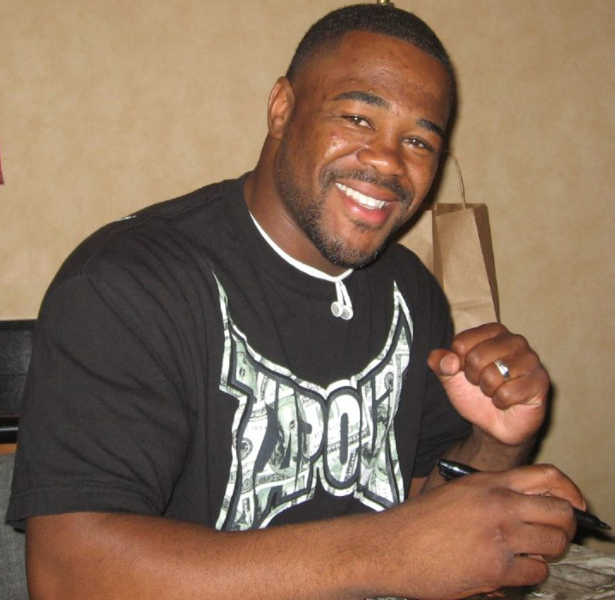
Rashad Evans, class of 2000

=== Alumni ===
- Mark Bridges, costume designer
- Rashad Evans, former mixed martial artist
- Eric Gansworth, novelist and poet
- Rick Hockenos, former basketball player and coach
- Richard Jacob, basketball coach
- Sean Jamieson, former baseball player
- Nancy J. King, member of the Maryland State Senate
- George Maziarz, former member of the New York State Senate
- Joe Micon, former member of the Indiana House of Representatives

=== Faculty ===
- Ray Hall, basketball coach
- Rich Kilgour, lacrosse coach
- Yu Liu, professor
- Don Luce, professor
- Robert Heisner, expert karate instructor for many years

== Gallery ==
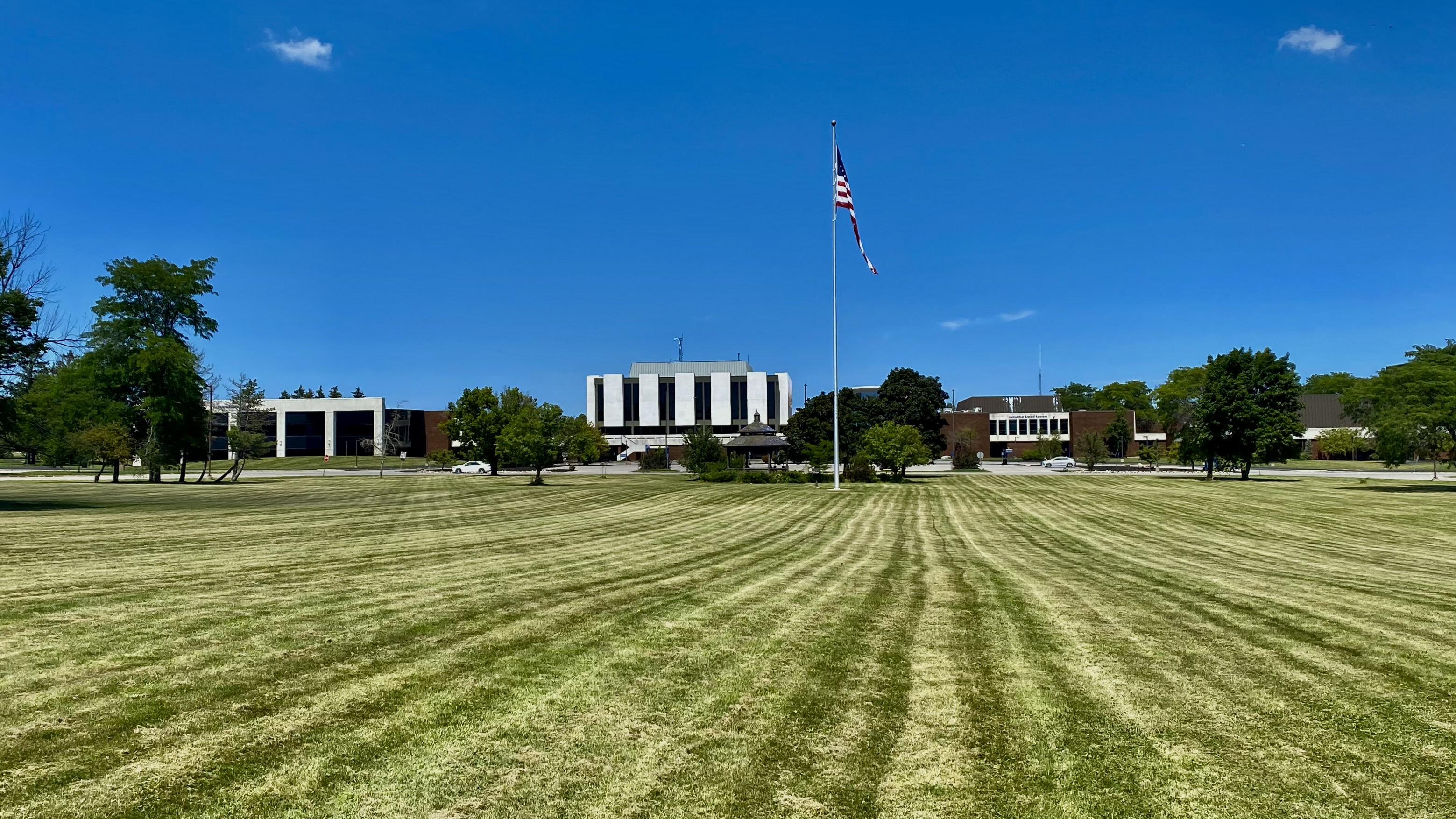
Campus

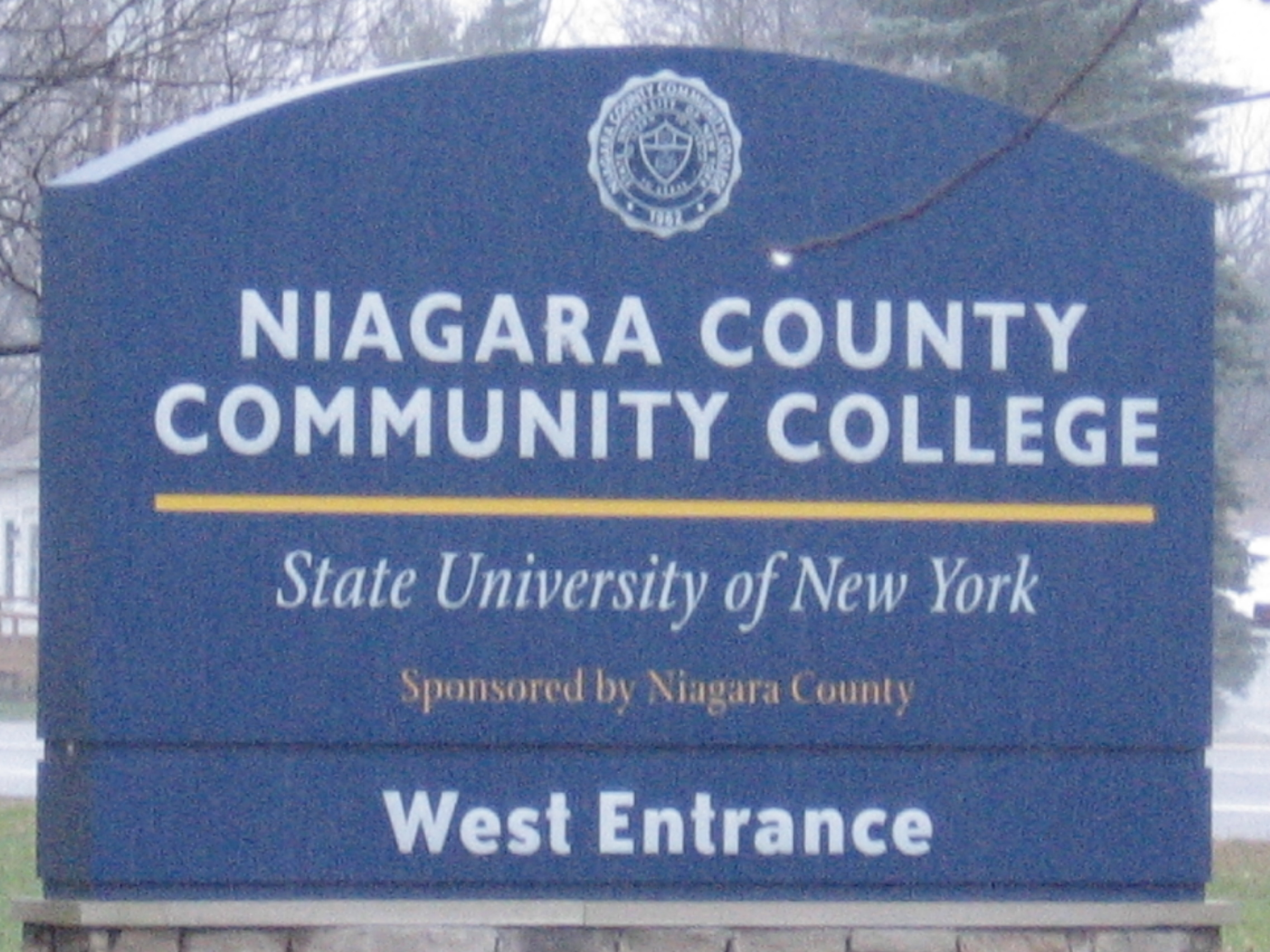
Entrance sign

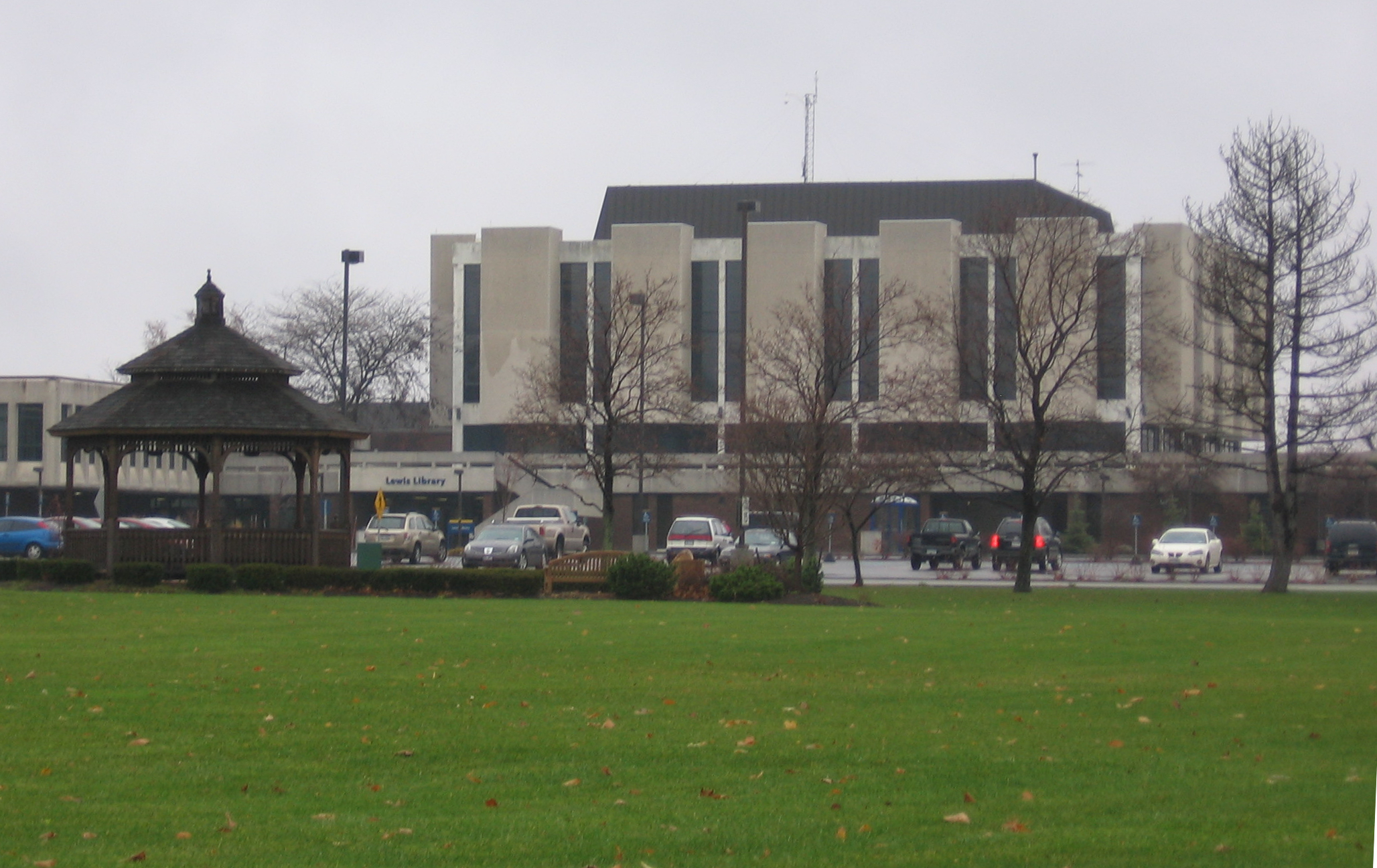
Henrietta G. Lewis Library

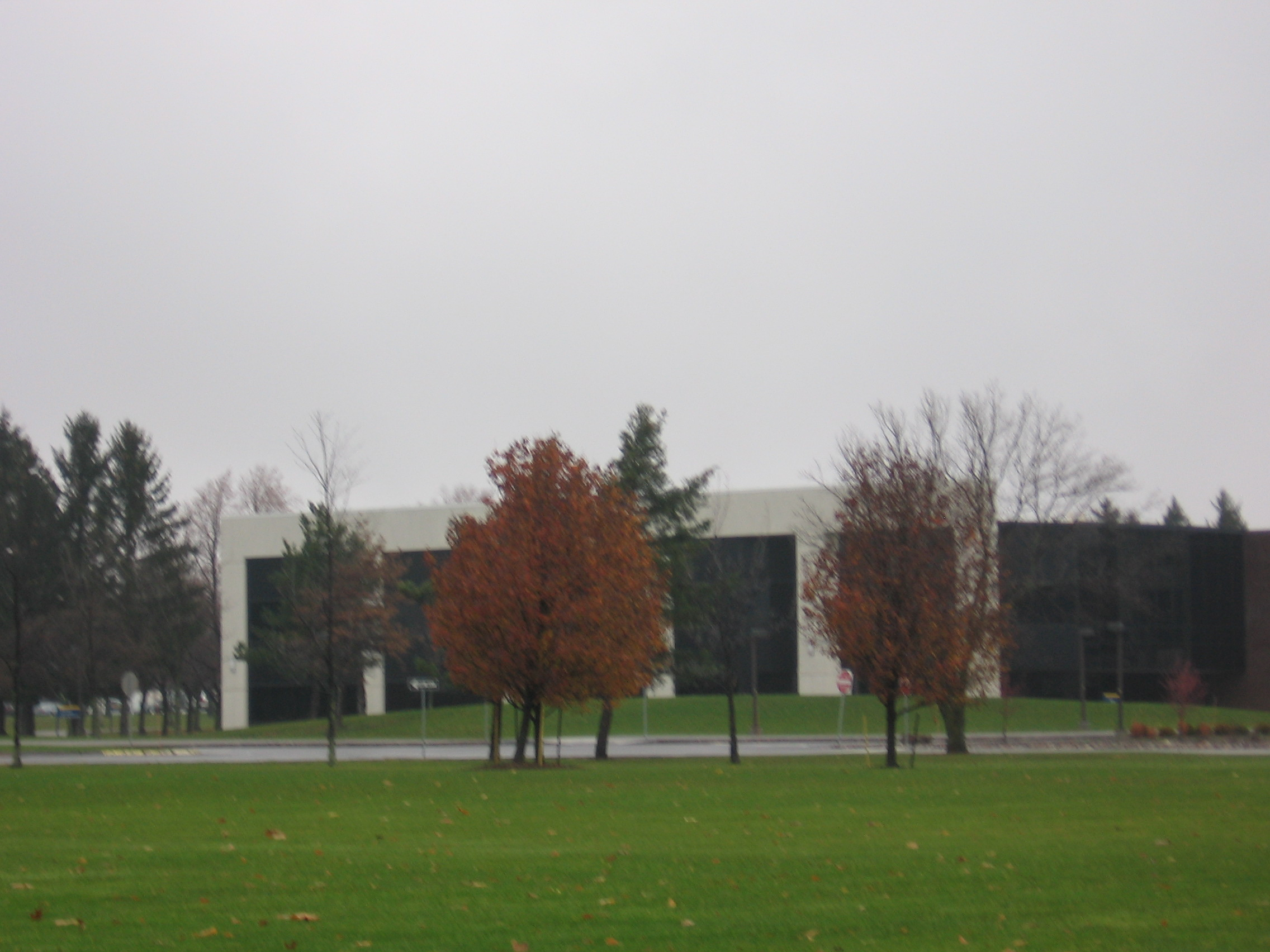
Ernest Nolar Administration Building
