= Cecil T. Patterson =

American martial artist

- Born: June 22, 1930; Sevierville, Tennessee, United States
- Died: October 27, 2002 (aged 72)
- Style: Wadō-ryū Karate
- Teacher: Hironori Ōtsuka
- Rank: 8th dan karate

Other information
- Website: U.S. Eastern Wado Ryu Karate Federation

Cecil T. Patterson (June 22, 1930 – October 27, 2002), among America’s earliest karateka, introduced the Wadō-ryū style of karate into the Eastern United States in 1958. Before his death in 2002, he had firmly established the United States Eastern Wadō-ryū Federation, previously known as the United States Eastern Wado-Kai Federation, a successful Karate organization 20 thousand strong, according to Patterson’s statement in an interview.

Born in 1930 in Sevierville, Tennessee, Patterson first enlisted in the US Navy at the age of fourteen. While stationed in Iwakuni, Japan, Patterson, then 25 years of age, undertook the study of Karate. According to the USEWF website, Patterson started Wado in 1955 under Kazuo Sakura; more specifically, he started training in August 1955. In 1957, Patterson opened the first karate school in Tennessee, and in 1963 organized the first karate tournament in the state. In 1978 Tennessee governor Ray Blanton signed into law a state senate resolution naming Patterson the father of karate in Tennessee.

== Dan Rankings ==
Patterson was the earliest non Japanese to receive dan ranking in Wado. The official USEWF website states that he received sho-dan in the year following his return from Japan when he was granted permission to teach Wado: “…in 1958, concurrent with his promotion to the rank of Sho Dan (1st Degree Black Belt) he received permission to teach the art of Wado Ryu selectively.” However, the USEWF website also maintains that he received his ni-dan before his discharge from the Navy: “Mr. Patterson’s devotion and hard worked [sic] earned him the rank of ni-dan (second-degree black belt) within two years, before his tour of duty ended and Patterson was shipped back home.” Patterson himself does not indicate the date in which he first received dan grading until it mentions his san-dan.

Patterson received instruction from many legendary masters in the martial arts. Without the direct supervision and assistance of an instructor but through telephone calls with Sakura in Japan, Patterson refined his skill over the next nine years. Mahanes indicates that “…it became increasingly difficult to stay true to the style have [sic] virtually no Wado senseis in the United States to guide his progress.” Necessarily training on his own in Wado Ryu, Patterson climbed from either a brown belt or ni-dan to much higher ranks. Within four years of his beginning training in Wado, he had attained the rank of san-dan in 1959. In 1964, Patterson attained the rank of yon-dan. Both his book and the USEWF site fails to mention who promoted Patterson to any of his early dan grades or if and where he took his exams until his go-dan promotion in 1968; thirteen years after he began the study of Karate, in 1968, Ohtsuka Sensei, recognizing the singular merit and abilities of Mr. Patterson, promoted him to go-dan. By the time of his 1976 publication of his yellow belt book, Patterson had attained the rank of roku-dan. Significantly, by the time of the publication of his go-kyu book in 1979, he had advanced to the rank of hachi-dan. In short, from the time he began training in 1955 to 1979, a total of 24 years, Patterson advanced from a beginner to the highest ranked non-Japanese in traditional Wado Karate.

== Establishment of the United States Eastern Wado-Ryu Federation ==
Patterson was one of twelve sanctioned teachers to have studied under Hironori Otsuka. In 1968, Otsuka charged Patterson with the establishment of the United States Eastern Wado Federation, which to date has burgeoned into a successful system that mandatorily requires membership of all participants who train with an USEWF dojo; regulates the promotions of students from white belt through the highest levels of dan grades; regulates the curriculum of authentic Wado-Ryu in the United States; maintains a network of affiliated instructors and dojos; maintains an extensive website; and provides a sport karate competition in the Cecil T Patterson memorial tournament, held annually in March. One of the hallmarks of the USEWF has been its continued close affiliation with Otsuka the elder and then the younger Otsuka the son.

== Legacy ==
Patterson’s legacy continues in the thousands of students he has instructed in the USEWF. Some of the more notable students have been Charles Parrish, Florida; Tom Stevenson, Alabama; David Deaton, Tennessee; Wayne Tyler, Tennessee; Jean Ellen Zimmermann, Tennessee; Micheal H. Vanatta Sr., Tennessee; Bill Taylor, Tennessee; George Johnson, Tennessee; Bill Herzer, Tennessee and Taylor K. Hayden, Tennessee. Until his death in 2002 he continued to train a special group of black belts weekly called Shihan Deishi. This group consisted of the following; Jimmy Edwards; Mike Vanatta Sr.; Steven O'Riley; and Buck Ford. The continued success of the USEWF stands as testament to Patterson’s effectiveness as an organizer and an administrator. The USEWF has been atypical of karate organizations, which commonly fracture and splinter into smaller groups at the death of their founder. With a relatively small number of defections in the immediate years following Patterson’s passing, his son, John, 7th Degree in Wado-Ryu, inherited an effectively intact USEWF. At last count, the USEWF boasts a membership of well over 17 thousand. In conjunction with establishing Wado and organizing the USEWF, Mr. Patterson has authored a number of books revolving around the topic of Wado-Ryu or police defensive tactics.

== Conclusion ==
By the 1980s, Patterson had attained the rank of hachidan (8th degree). While reluctant to accept the title of master, Patterson was a master equal in stature to American karate pioneers Robert Trias and Ed Parker. In his later years, he took to wearing a white belt rather than the traditional black belt, which demonstrated his humility and modest reluctance to accept the acclaim from others. Until his death, Patterson diligently propagated traditional Wado-Ryu Karate in the Eastern United States. In his book, Robin Reilly briefly identifies those traditional Karate organization in the U.S. and indicates that Patterson was most responsible for traditional Wado Ryu Karate in the Eastern US while his Master Ajari was responsible for the propagation of traditional Wado in the Western US.
