= Sprawl (grappling) =

Defensive grappling position

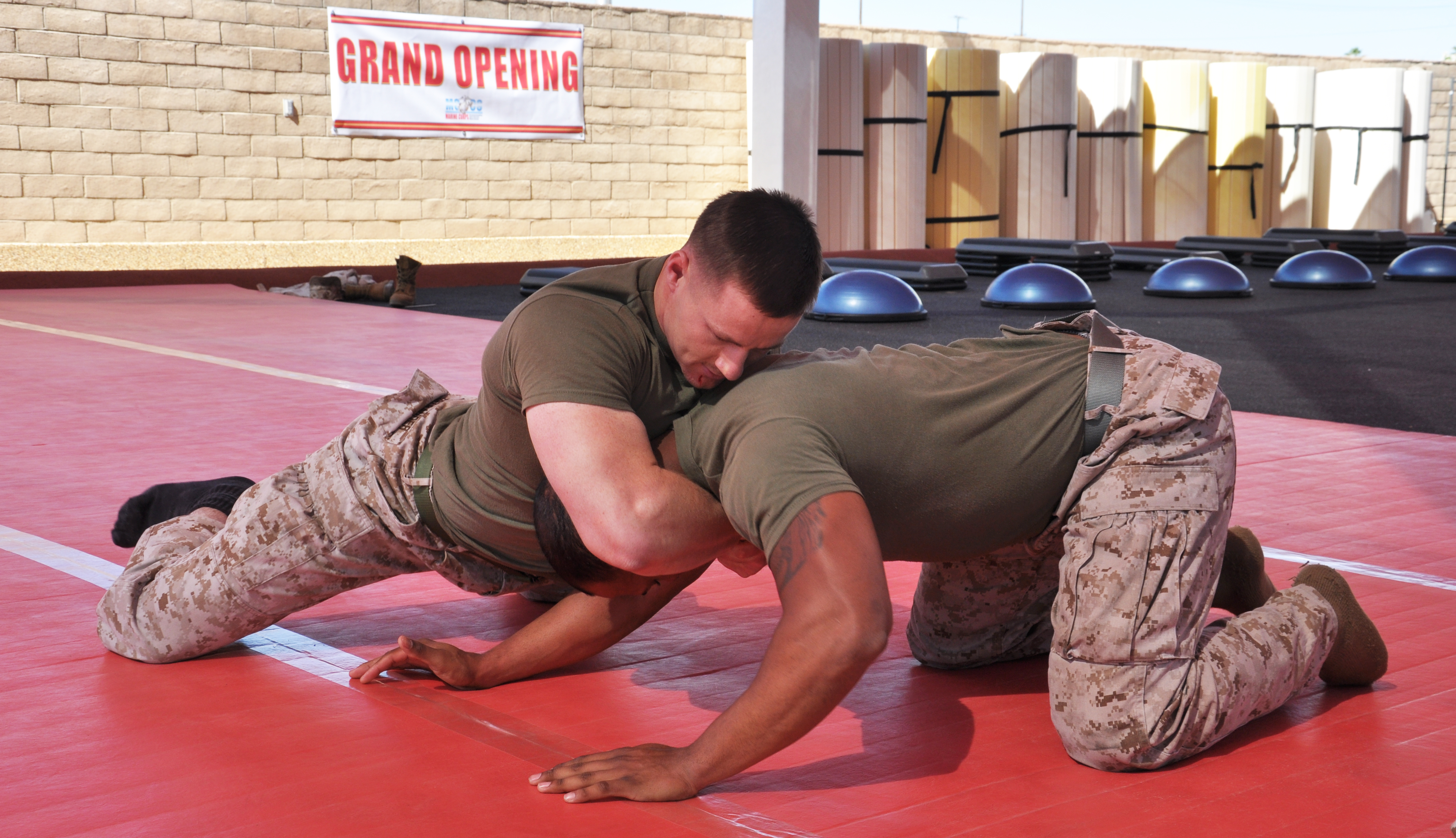
- A defence against a takedown attempt—the top wrestler scoots his legs away from the opponent and hips downwards.
- Classification: Clinch hold
- Style: Wrestling

A sprawl is a martial arts and wrestling term for a defensive technique that is done in response to certain takedown attempts, typically double or single leg takedown attempts. The sprawl is performed by scooting the legs backwards, so as to land on the upper back of the opponent attempting the takedown. The resultant position is also known as a sprawl or sprawling position.

Ideally, the sprawling combatant should create safe hip extension as much as possible and keep his knees off the floor. His options from the sprawl include attempting to gain leverage on the lower back by hooking underneath the elbows, throwing in a headlock, and grabbing his opponent's ankles and trying to get behind his opponent. Keeping the knees off the ground creates more weight pushing down on the opponent.

In mixed martial arts, sprawling is an important aspect of the sprawl-and-brawl strategy, while it is also used by numerous other wrestlers and mixed martial arts stylists.

The sprawl is also used in some forms of exercise, and commonly confused with the burpee. The sprawl is generally seen as a bad exercise for the lower-back, this is however not true as the sprawl, when performed correctly by athletes that are conditioned and flexible, is just as safe as the burpee. The important thing is to create hip extension rather than arching the back. Proper hip extension is created by squeezing the glutes, this in turn pulls the pelvis back upon which the spine safely follows.

== See also ==
- Takedown
