= Shindō Yōshin-ryū =

School of Japanese martial arts

Shindō Yōshin-ryū (新道楊心流)
- Ko-ryū
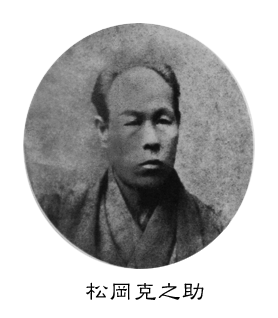
- Katsunosuke Matsuoka, Shindō Yōshin-ryū founder

Foundation
- Founder: Katsunosuke Matsuoka (1836–1898)
- Date founded: 1864
- Period founded: Late Edo period (1603–1868)

Current information
- Current headquarters: Tokyo, Japan – mainline; Evergreen, Colorado – Takamura-ha

Arts taught
- Art: Description
- Jūjutsu: Grappling art
- Kenjutsu: Sword art

Ancestor schools
- Hokushin Ittō-ryū; Hōzōin-ryū; Kashima Shinden Jikishinkage-ryū; Tenjin Shin'yō-ryū; Akiyama Yōshin-ryū; Totsuka-ha Yōshin ryu; Nakamura Yoshin Ko-ryu)

Descendant schools
- Takamura-ha Shindō Yōshin-ryū; Wadō-ryū

Shindō Yōshin-ryū (新道楊心流), meaning "New Willow School" is a traditional school (ko-ryū) of Japanese martial arts, teaching primarily the art of jūjutsu. The first kanji of the name originally translated into "新=New", but in the mainline branch the kanji for "new" was eventually changed into the homophonic "神=sacred". The name of the school may also be transliterated as Shintō Yōshin-ryū, but the koryu tradition should not be confused with the modern school of Shintōyōshin-ryū which is unconnected.

== History / Mainline Branch ==
The Shindō Yōshin-ryū tradition was founded late in the Edo period by a Kuroda clan retainer named Katsunosuke Matsuoka (1836–1898) Katsunosuke was born in Edo-Hantei, the Edo headquarters of the Kuroda clan in 1836. Katsunosuke opened his first dōjō in 1858 in the Asakusa district of Edo where he taught Tenjin Shinyō-ryū jūjutsu. He also stood in for his teacher Sakakibara Kenkichi, fourteenth headmaster of the Kashima Shinden Jikishinkage-ryū school of kenjutsu, during Sakakibara's service to the shōgun Tokugawa Iemochi. Over the years Katsunosuke became convinced that the contemporary jūjutsu systems of the late Edo period had lost much of their military usefulness, evolving into systems driven more by individual challenge matches than effective military engagement. For this reason in 1864 he decided to combine his expertise in kenjutsu and jūjutsu by formulating a new system of his own creation called Shindō Yōshin-ryū, meaning "new willow school." Despite having no first-hand experience of battle at the time, Katsunosuke intended this new system embrace a curriculum reflecting that of a sōgō bujutsu or integrated martial system in order that it be militarily applicable. By 1868, Katsunosuke had witnessed the Meiji Restoration and fought on the losing side of the Boshin War. Following the collapse of the Tokugawa shogunate Katsunosuke relocated to Ueno Village, north of Edo, eventually constructing a new dojo there. Following Katsunosuke's relocation to Ueno, the dojo in Asakusa became a branch dojo under the direction of licensed instructor, Inose Matakichi.

Shindō Yōshin-ryū split into two lines in 1895 when an aging Katsunosuke authorized another licensed student living in Edo named Shigeta Ohbata to separate from the mainline and lead his own branch of Shindō Yōshin-ryū. This line became the Ohbata-ha Shindō Yōshin-ryū.

Katsunosuke Matsuoka died in 1898 at the age of 62. Without a male heir, the Matsuoka family appointed Matakichi Inose as the temporary headmaster of Shindō Yōshin-ryū. With this appointment it was understood that the headmastership would return to the Matsuoka family when Katsunosuke's grandson, Tatsuo, reached adulthood. During this period of Inose's leadership, he awarded a Menkyo Kaiden to Tatsusaburo Nakayama, who taught at Shimozuma Middle School for approximately 20 years. In 1917, following Tatsuo's graduation from Tokyo Medical College, Matakichi Inose formally returned the headmastership of Shindō Yōshin-ryū to the Matsuoka family via Tatsuo. On 21 June 1921, Nakayama awarded a Menkyo Kaiden to Hironori Otsuka, later founder of Wado Ryu, who was his student since 1903. In addition to functioning as the 3rd headmaster of Shindō Yōshin-ryū, Tatsuo Matsuoka was a successful politician and an accomplished Judoka, eventually attaining the rank of 7th dan. He died in 1989 at the age of 95.

As Tatsuo Matsuoka did not appoint a 4th generation headmaster, the transmission ended with his death. The remaining students of mainline Shindō Yōshin-ryū formed a new organization called the Shindō Yōshin-ryū Domonkai and appointed Dr. Ryozo Fujiwara to lead this organization. Dr. Fujiwara currently functions as Shindō Yōshin-ryū’s representative to the prestigious Nippon Kobudō Kyōkai in Tokyo.

== History / Ohbata-Takamura Branch ==
The Ohbata/Takamura branch originated with Shigeta Ohbata who received menkyo kaiden in 1895 from Katsukosuke Matsuoka. Shigeta was born in Kyoto in 1863 to a samurai named Ohbata Shibuharu. As a child Shigeta was enrolled in a school of Miura Yōshin Koryū. He moved to Edo in 1883 to continue his training in Totsuka-ha Yōshin Koryū under the famed Hidemi Totsuka. In 1885 he commenced training in Shindō Yōshin-ryū directly under headmaster Katsunosuke Matsuoka. In 1895 after he was awarded a menkyo kaiden he was permitted to separate from the mainline school by Katsunosuke and subsequently founded his own line. In 1898 Shigeta Ohbata opened a dojo in the Asakusa district of Tokyo and named this dojo the Ohbata Eibukan.

Shigeta Ohbata was a prominent budoka of the early 20th Century who fraternized with such notable budo personalities as Katsuta Hiratsuka/Yōshin-ryū, Masamizu Inazu/Yōshin Koryū, Jigoro Kano/Jūdō, Takeda Sokaku/Daitō-ryū, Yoshida Kōtarō/Daitō-ryū and Takayoshi Katayama/Yōshin-ryū.

In 1899 a son was born to Shigeta Ohbata named Hideyoshi. Shigeta saw to it that his son was extensively trained in Shindō Yōshin-ryū as he was expected to eventually succeed his father as the 2nd headmaster. In 1928 a son was born to Hideyoshi Ohbata named Yukiyoshi. During World War 2 Hideyoshi Ohbata was killed during the Allied siege of Saipan. Upon receiving this news, Shigeta Ohbata awarded his grandson Yukiyoshi Ohbata a menkyo kaiden and appointed him as his formal successor. At this time Shigeta also appointed a fully licensed instructor named Namishiro Matsuhiro to personally oversee his grandsons training. Shigeta Ohbata was killed and the Ohbata Eibukan dojo destroyed in 1945 during the Allied firebombing of Tokyo.

In the decade following the war, Yukiyoshi Ohbata left Japan eventually settling in Stockholm, Sweden. During this period Yukiyoshi abandoned using the name Ohbata and adopted the family name Takamura. In the 1960s Yukiyoshi married and immigrated to the United States. This move coincided with an explosion of American interest in Asian martial arts. Consequently, Yukiyoshi cultivated a dedicated group of students in the area of Northern California. Around 1968, Yukiyoshi Takamura renamed the art he taught Takamura-ha Shindō Yōshin-ryū and founded an organization to oversee the promotion of the art. This was the birth of the Takamura-ha Shindō Yōshin Kai. This organization slowly grew in membership over the next twenty years and by the mid-1980s supported ten dojos and fifteen licensed instructors teaching in America, the Philippines, Japan and Europe.

In 1996 following a cancer diagnosis, Yukiyoshi Takamura convened a meeting of his senior instructors in San Francisco. Present at this meeting were Takagi Iso (Japan), David Maynard (United States), Henri Gembelliot (France), Tobin Threadgill (United States) and Nanette Okura (United States). At this meeting Takamura's vision for the future of the ryuha was discussed and a revised draft of the organizations kaiki (bylaws) completed. Prior to his death he awarded three students menkyo kaiden in Takamura-ha Shindō Yōshin-ryū. These were Iso Takagi in Osaka, David Maynard in the United Kingdom, and Tobin E. Threadgill in the United States. Initially the organization was intended to be overseen by a board composed of these three individuals, each responsible for different geographical areas, but in 2003, Iso Takagi and David Maynard retired from active teaching due to health issues. With these retirements, Tobin E. Threadgill was asked to ascend to the position of kaichō as outlined in the organizations kaiki, and now oversees the organization worldwide.

The Takamura-ha Shindō Yōshin Kai continues today under the direction of Tobin E. Threadgill with its headquarters dojo located in Evergreen, Colorado. The organization currently has dojos operating in the United States, Canada, Spain, Portugal, Germany, France, United Kingdom, Finland, Sweden, New Zealand and Australia.

== Curriculum ==
The Shindō Yōshin-ryū syllabus is heavily influenced by two different lines of Yōshin-ryū, the Akiyama Yōshin-ryū (Tenjin Shin'yō-ryū) and Nakamura Yōshin Koryu (Totsuka-ha Yōshin-ryū). As a student of the teachings of Hōzōin-ryū, Kashima Shinden Jikishinkage-ryū, Hokushin Ittō-ryū, Totsuka-ha Yōshin Koryū and Tenjin Shin'yō-ryū, Matsuoka Katsunosuke consolidated many concepts of these various traditions into the foundational Shindō Yōshin-ryū.

The curriculum of Shindō Yōshin-ryū is organized in a manner consistent with most classical schools of budo. The teachings are divided into three levels represented by the issuing of teaching licenses. These are shoden, chūden and jōden gokui. An administrative license also exists which represents ultimate authority over the issuing of these licenses. This administrative license is called a menkyo kaiden. As with most classical schools of budo, there was no technical ranking system similar to the kyū/dan system commonly associated with modern forms of budo.

Shindō Yōshin-ryū emphasizes grace and natural movement. Although Shindō Yōshin-ryū reflects the combining of elements of the Tenjin Shin'yō-ryū and the Totsuka-ha Yōshin Koryū, its waza demonstrates a softer, more weapon influenced execution of technique.

The Takamura branch includes further influence from Matsuzaki Shinkage-ryū Hyōhō.

== Influence on karate ==
Shindō Yōshin-ryū was fundamental in the founding of one of Japan's most prominent styles of karate, Wadō-ryū. The founder of Wadō-ryū, Hironori Ohtsuka, studied Shindō Yōshin-ryū under a licensed instructor named Tatsusaburo Nakayama. Nakayama was the chief instructor of the Genbukan dojo in Shimotsuma city and the physical education teacher at Shimotsuma Middle School.
