= Yu Liu (professor) =

American historian

Yu Liu is an American historian, and professor at Niagara County Community College.

He graduated from Luoyang Foreign Languages Institute, China, with a Bachelor of Arts; from Lancaster University with a Master of Arts; from Edinburgh University with a Master of Science; and from University at Buffalo, The State University of New York with a Ph.D. In the Spring of 2018, he was a Fellow at the Swedish Collegium for Advanced Study in Uppsala, Sweden.

== Awards ==
- 2006 Guggenheim Fellow

== Works ==
- "The Importance of the Chinese Connection: The Origin of the English Garden", Eighteenth-Century Life, Volume 27, Number 3, Fall 2003, pp. 70–98
- "Seeing God Differently: Chinese Piety and European Modernity", History of Religions, 45 no.1 (2005), pp. 29–44
- "The Intricacies of Accommodation: The Proselytizing Strategy of Matteo Ricci", Journal of World History, December 2008, Encyclopædia Britannica
- Seeds of a Different Eden: Chinese Gardening Ideas, University of South Carolina Press. 2008, ISBN 978-1-57003-769-6
- Poetics and Politics: The Revolutions of Wordsworth, P. Lang, 1999, ISBN 978-0-8204-4168-9
