= Kata guruma =

Judo throw

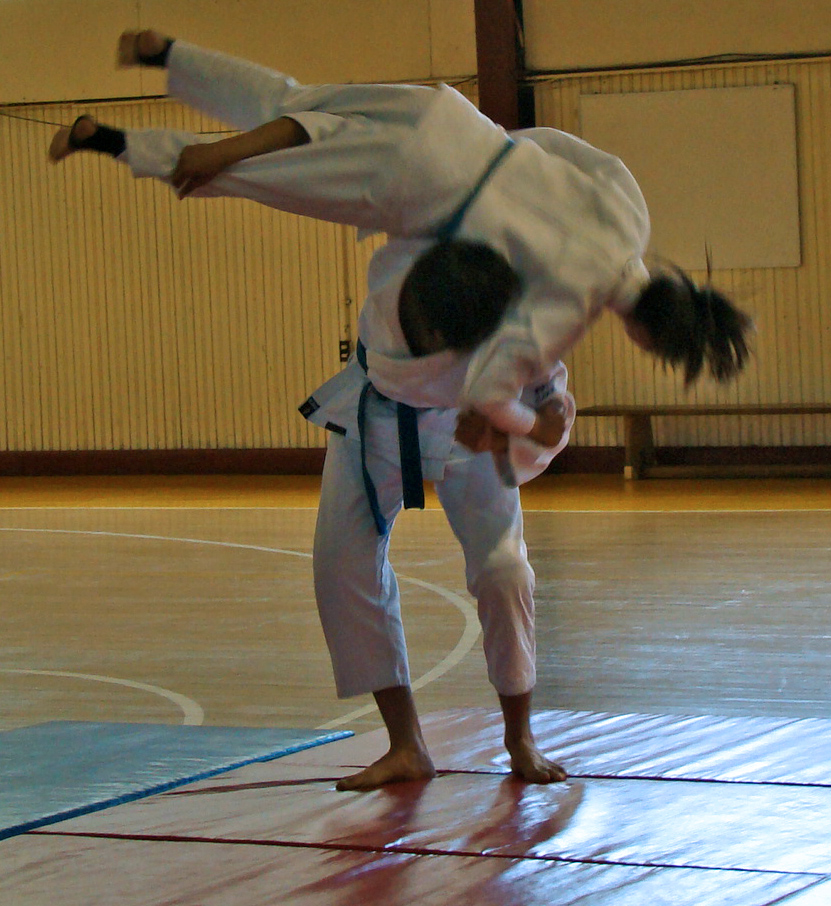
- Judoka demonstrate Kata-guruma throw
- Classification: Nage-waza
- Sub classification: Te-waza

Technique name
- Rōmaji: Kata-guruma
- Japanese: 肩車
- English: Shoulder wheel
- Korean: 어깨로 메치기

Kata guruma demonstration

Kata guruma (肩車) is one of the traditional forty throws of judo as developed by Kano Jigoro. Kata guruma belongs to the third group of the traditional throwing list in the Gokyo no waza of the Kodokan Judo. It is also part of the current 67 Throws of Kodokan Judo. Because the technique is not a sweep nor a trip and requires tori to pull uke into a carry, it is categorized as a hand throwing technique (tewaza).

== Description ==
In The Essence of Judo, Kyuzo Mifune demonstrates three variations of kata guruma. In the second variation, Mifune steps behind uke, and in the third he steps behind uke and grabs uke's left leg instead. In all three variations, uke is lifted up to tori's shoulder behind tori's head, and then dropped forward (as in the above clip). The drop kata guruma is a variant of kata guruma. Other, minor variations were invented by Mifune's understudy Kyutaro Kanda.

Ronda Rousey uses a variation in WWE where she drops opponents backwards like a Samoan drop. Because the most common versions of kata guruma involve a grip below the belt/touching the legs, these variations are now illegal under the current International Judo Federation rules (as of 2019).

== See also ==
- The Canon Of Judo
- Fireman's carry
- Judo technique
