= Wadō-ryū =

Style of karate

Wadō-ryū (和道流)
- The flag of Wadō-ryū.
- Also known as: Shinshu Wadoryu Karate-Jujutsu (Note: What the style was called originally when Hironori Ōtsuka registered the style with Dai Nippon Butoku Kai in 1938. Was soon shortened to just "Wado-Ryu".)
- Date founded: 1929 (Note: When Hironori Otsuka first began to teach Karate to others at Tokyo University.) or 1938 (Note: When Hironori Ōtsuka registered his style of karate with the Dai Nippon Butoku Kai under the name of "Shinshu Wadoryu Karate-Jujutsu.")
- Country of origin: Japan
- Founder: Hironori Ōtsuka
- Arts taught: Karate
- Ancestor arts: Karate (Shotokan, Shitō-ryū and Motobu-ryū), Jujutsu (Shindō Yōshin-ryū, other)
- Descendant arts: Shaolin Nam Pai Chuan, Sanjuro

Wadō-ryū (和道流) is one of the four major karate styles (Note: As in, being one of the four styles recognised by Japan Karate Federation. The others being Goju-Ryu, Shotokan and Shito-Ryu.) and was founded by Hironori Ōtsuka (1892–1982). Ōtsuka was a Menkyo Kaiden licensed Shindō Yōshin-ryū practitioner of Tatsusaburo Nakayama and a student of Yōshin-ryū prior to meeting the Okinawan karate master Gichin Funakoshi. After having learned from Funakoshi, and after their split, with Okinawan masters such as Kenwa Mabuni and Motobu Chōki, Ōtsuka merged Shindō Yōshin-ryū with Okinawan karate. The result of Ōtsuka's efforts is Wadō-ryū Karate.

As such, Wadō-ryū places emphasis on not only striking, but tai sabaki, joint locks and throws. It has its origins within Shindō Yōshin-ryū jujitsu, as well as Shotokan, Tomari-te and Shito-Ryu karate.

== Etymology ==
The name Wadō-ryū has three parts: Wa, dō, and ryū. Wa means "harmony," dō (same character as tao) means "way," and ryū means "school" or "style". Harmony should not be interpreted as pacifism; it is simply the acknowledgment that yielding is sometimes more effective than brute strength, which founds the art's mentality in fighting. Additionally, Kanji Wa (和) used is also a Kanji for Japan, due to the influence of Japanese Jujutsu in Wadō-Ryū, meant in contrast to the other karate styles originating from Okinawa.

== Characteristics ==
To the untrained observer, Wadō-ryū might look similar to other styles of karate, like its parent school of Shotokan. Most of the underlying principles, however, were derived from Shindō Yōshin-ryū, an atemi waza focused style of Jujutsu. Indeed, from one point of view, Wadō-ryū might be considered a style of Jūjutsu rather than Karate. Hironori Ōtsuka embraced jujitsu and was its chief instructor for a time. When Ōtsuka first registered his school with the Dai Nippon Butoku Kai in 1938, the style was called "Shinshu Wadō-ryū Karate-Jūjutsu," a name that reflects its hybrid character.

Additionally, there are noticeable differences in the katas compared to other styles such as Shōtōkan. Wadō-Ryū katas have a lighter, less powerful appearance and are economical in movement. Defensive techniques do not block an opponent’s attack, but rather redirect it.

=== Technique ===
Wado-ryu karatedo is characterised by evasion instead of meeting force with force, and by light, fast, and fluid body movement. The Wado-ryu stylist defends with parries and deflections with simultaneous counterattacks.

— David Jones

Similar to Shotokan Karate, Wadō-ryū employs linear striking, but forgoes with Shotokan's aggressive approach. Instead, Wadō-ryū opts tai sabaki (often incorrectly referred to as 'evasion') as its key principle. The Japanese term can be translated as "body-management," and refers to body manipulation so as to move the defender as well as the attacker out of harm's way. The way to achieve this is to 'move along' rather than to 'move against'—or harmony rather than physical strength. Using these principles, the energy of the attack is diverted and evaded, and then or simultaneously countered with joint-locking, throwing, or striking techniques. The technical execution is subject to the following principles:

- Sanmi Ittai – Every technique in Wadō-Ryū (Ten gi) simultaneously includes a change in position (Ten i) and a shift in the weight of the body (Ten tai).
- Execution of all movements while avoiding the following errors: No incorrect or superfluous technique, no superfluous movement, no superfluous expenditure of force.
- Control of your own center of gravity.
- Tai Sabaki – Leaving the line of attack by dodging.
- Defending against an attack and countering occur simultaneously, as well as doing so without hesitation.
- Kyusho – Techniques are aimed at the attacker’s vital points.
- Smooth transitions between the individual techniques.

Wadō-ryū is also characterised by a higher body position and stances than in other Karate styles.

Modern karate competition tends to transform Wadō-ryū away from its roots towards a new generic karate that appeals more to the demands of both spectators and competitors.

A block in Wadō may look much like a block in Goju/Uechi ryu, but they are executed from different perspectives.

While the core principles (at least with regard to the transmission of body mass into punches) of turning on the heel remain in Wadō, as it is the fastest way to push the hips in the direction of attack, the progression to the ball of the foot is a hallmark of the style.

=== Kata ===
Kata are predefined, specific patterns of movement that incorporate and encapsulate martial techniques, concepts, and applications. Wadō-Ryū takes a different approach to kata training than other styles. Ōtsuka Hironori adopted the katas from Gichin Funakoshi, but used a different kanji for the term kata. In Wadō-Ryū, he replaced the meaning of original mold or template (Japanese 型) of the kata in Shōtōkan with the meaning of symbol (Japanese 形). This means that the practitioner should not always aim for the same form of a kata, but rather allow and even encourage changes to a kata due to the age and other individual characteristics of the karateka.

In his 1977 book on Wadō-ryū (published in English in 1997), Ōtsuka declared only nine official kata for Wadō-ryū: Pinan Nidan, Pinan Shodan, Pinan Sandan, Pinan Yodan, Pinan Godan, Kūshankū, Naihanchi, Seishan and Chintō. However, after his death, other organizations of the style have added other forms, such as unsu and kumpu. However, it can be said that all individual kata originate from Shuri-te.

As such, The exact movements of a kata often vary from one organization to another, and even from one school to another within the same organization. The variations can range from significant deviations apparent to the untrained observer to very subtle minutiae.

Kata associated with Wadō-ryū include:

- Ten-No: basic drills first invented by Gigō Funakoshi (son of Gichin Funakoshi).
- Taikyoku series: developed by Gichin Funakoshi as a preliminary exercise before the Pinan series; many Wadō-ryū schools teach these basic kata, particularly Taikyoku Shodan (太極初段).
- Pinan kata: created by Ankō Itosu, and consisting of Pinan Shodan (平安初段), Pinan Nidan (平安二段), Pinan Sandan (平安三段), Pinan Yodan (平安四段), and Pinan Godan (平安五段). Funakoshi renamed this series as the Heian series.
- Kūshankū クーシャンクー (公相君): "Sky Viewing". Kūshankū was the Okinawan name for Kwang Shang Fu, a Sapposhi (emissary of China's ruling class) sent to Okinawa in the 18th century. This kata uses stances and attacks consisting of the five previous Pinan kata. No new techniques are introduced. Funakoshi renamed this kata as Kankū Dai.
- Naihanchi ナイハンチ (内畔戦; also known as Naifanchi): this was the original name for the three Tekki kata, but was changed by Funakoshi. This is a lateral kata learned from Chōki Motobu. Wadō-ryū practices only the first Naihanchi kata.
- Seishan セイシャン (征射雲): the name means "13 hands." This kata was named after a well-known Chinese martial artist who lived in or near Shuri c. 1700. The movements are repeated in sets of three, and has pivots and turning of the head. Funakoshi renamed this kata as Hangetsu.
- Chintō チントウ (鎮闘): formulated by Matsumura Sōkon from the teachings of a sailor or pirate named Chintō (or Annan, depending on the source). Crane stance occurs many times, and the flying kicks differentiate Chintō from other kata. Funakoshi renamed this kata as Gankaku.
- Bassai バッサイ (披塞; also known as Passai): a Tomari-te kata that uses dynamic stances and hip rotation. Funakoshi renamed this kata as Bassai Dai.
- Rōhai ローハイ (老梅): Rōhai has three variation invented by Itosu. Wadō-ryū practices Rōhai Shodan. Funakoshi renamed this kata as Meikyo.
- Niseishi ニーセイシ: the name means "24 steps." Transmitted by Ankichi Aragaki, this kata is known in Japanese as Nijūshiho (二十四步).
- Wanshū ワンシュウ (晩愁): the name means "flying swallow." This is a Tomari-te kata based on movements brought to Okinawa in 1683 by a Chinese envoy of the same name. The metaphorical name, "Flying Swallows," comes from the soft blocking sequences near the end of this kata. Funakoshi renamed this kata as Empi.
- Jion ジオン (慈恩): A Tomari-te kata; part of the Jion kata group.
- Jitte ジッテ (十手): another Tomari-te kata of the Jion kata group; the name means "10 hands."
- Suparinpei スーパーリンペイ (壱百零八拳): known as "108 hands," representing the 108 evil spirits of man. This kata is also said to have represented a band of 108 warriors that travelled the Chinese countryside in the 17th century, performing 'Robin Hood'-type tasks of doing good deeds, giving to the poor, and so on. It is also known by its Chinese name of Pechurrin, and occasionally referred to as Haiku Hachi Ho (a name given by Funakoshi). Suparinpei was originally listed as a Wadō-ryū kata with the Dai Nippon Butoku Kai by Hironori Ōtsuka, but he eventually discarded it. Some Wadō-ryū instructors and schools still teach this kata.
- Kunpu
- Unsū: the name means "cloud hands". Advanced kata also found in Shotokan, as well as Shito-Ryu. Its origins are a mystery, and its speculated to have originated from either Dragon-style of Chinese Kung Fu or Arakaki Seishō.

In addition to the solo kata listed above, many Wadō-ryū schools also practice paired kata, which reflects its jujutsu heritage. These paired kata are performed by two people (one as the attacker and one as the defender), demonstrating a range of self-defense techniques. The paired kata of Wadō-ryū often vary from one organisation from another, because Ōtsuka did not standardise them. The paired kata are:

- Yakusoku Kihon Kumite: consists of 10 fundamental techniques of attack against combination attacks (combinations of kicks and punches), influenced by jujutsu body movements.
- Kumite Gata: consists of 10 – 24 varietal techniques (depending on the organisation) of attack emphasizing Katamae (pinning) and Kuzushi (breaking balance) and multiple strikes.
- Ohyo Kumite: consists of various techniques of attack, incorporating Karate blocks, kicks and strikes with jujutsu throws and body movements. This is a specialty of Tatsuo Suzuki Hanshi's W.I.K.F organisation.
- Idori no Kata: consists of 5–10 techniques (depending on the organisation) of seated self-defense, influenced by jujutsu throwing and joint-locking techniques.
- Tantodori no Kata: consists of 7–10 techniques (depending on the organisation) of defenses against knife attacks, influenced by jujutsu body movements, throwing, and joint-locking techniques.
- Shinken Shirahadori (真剣白刃取り): consists of 5–10 (depending on organisation) techniques of defenses against sword attacks, influenced by jujutsu body movements, throwing, and joint-locking techniques.

In addition to the three paired kata above, there are also Gyakunage Kata (kata of throwing), Joshi Goshinjutsu (kata of women's self-defense), Kodokan Goshin Jutsu & some others, but they are not commonly taught.

== Ranks ==
Wadō-ryū uses a typical karate belt order to denote rank. The beginner commences at 9th or 10th kyū (depending on the organisation and school) and progresses to 1st kyū, then from 1st–5th dan for technical grades. The ranks of 6th–10th dan are honorary ranks. Although some other karate styles add stripes to their belt for the dan ranks, Wado-ryū practitioners tend not to follow that practice.

The rank at which Wado practitioners are first able to teach is usually 3rd dan, but this depends on the organisation. Some Wado ryu organisations require completion of a special course in addition to attaining a certain dan rank.

Schools that use the same belt colour for multiple kyu ranks typically, although not necessarily, use stripes to indicate progress within that belt colour.

== History ==
The founder of Wadō-ryū, Hironori Ōtsuka, was born on 1 June 1892 in Shimodate, Ibaraki Prefecture, Japan. In 1898, Ōtsuka began practicing koryū jujutsu under Chojiro Ebashi. From 1905–1921, he studied Shindō Yōshin-ryū jujutsu under Tatsusaburo Nakayama. In 1922, he met Gichin Funakoshi and began to train under him. In 1924, Ōtsuka became one of the first students promoted to black belt in karate by Funakoshi. To broaden his knowledge of Karate, Ōtsuka also studied with other prominent masters such as Kenwa Mabuni of Shitō-ryū and Motobu Chōki.

By 1927, Ōtsuka had become an assistant instructor in Funakoshi's Shotokan school. In 1929, Ōtsuka organised the first school karate club at Tokyo University. Eiichi Eriguchi coined the term 'Wadō-ryū' in 1934.

In 1938, Ōtsuka registered his style of karate with the Dai Nippon Butoku Kai under the name of "Shinshu Wadoryu Karate-Jujutsu." Soon after, however, this was shortened to "Wadō-ryū" (和道流). In 1938, the Dai Nippon Butoku Kai awarded Ōtsuka the rank of Renshi-Go, followed in 1942 by the rank of Kyoshi-Go. It was around this time that Tatsuo Suzuki, founder of the WIKF, began training in Wadō-ryū. In 1944, Ōtsuka was appointed Japan's Chief Karate Instructor. In 1946, Ōtsuka awarded Tatsuo Suzuki the rank of 2nd dan.

Around 1950, Jiro Ōtsuka (the founder's second son) began training in Wadō-ryū while in his adolescent years. In 1951, Ōtsuka awarded Tatsuo Suzuki the rank of 5th dan, the highest rank awarded in Wadō-ryū at that time. In 1952, the Wadō-ryū headquarters (honbu) was established at the Meiji University dojo in Tokyo. In 1954, its name was changed to Zen Nippon Karate Renmei (All Japan Karate Federation). In 1955, Ōtsuka published "Karatejutsu no Kenkyu," a book expounding his style of karate. In 1963, he dispatched Suzuki, along with Toru Arakawa and Hajimu Takashima, to spread Wadō-ryū around the world.

In 1964, the Japan Karate Federation (JKF) was established as a general organisation for all karate styles. Wadō-ryū joined this organisation as a major group. In 1965, Ōtsuka and Yoshiaki Ajari recorded onto film (which is now still available on two video tapes) much of the legacy of Wadō-ryū karate. The first video, "Wadō-ryū Karate Volume 1," consists of: in-depth history and recollections; demonstrations of the eight Kihon No Tsuki body shifts; the first five Kihon-Kumite; and the kata Pinan 1–5, Kūshankū, Jion, Naihanchi, and Seishan. The second video, "Wadō-ryū Karate Volume 2," consists of: more history; the kata Chintō, Niseishi, Rōhai, Wanshu, and Jitte; as well as Kihon-Kumite 6–10, along with application. In 1966, Ōtsuka was awarded the Order of the Rising Sun, Fifth Class by Emperor Hirohito for his dedication to the introduction and teaching of karate. On 5 June 1967, the Wadō-ryū organisation changed its name to "Wadōkai."

In 1972, the President of Kokusai Budō Renmei, a member of the Japanese royal family, awarded Ōtsuka the title of Meijin. In 1975, Suzuki received his 8th dan, the highest grade ever given (at the time) by the Federation of All Japan Karate-dō Organisations, and was named Hanshi-Go by the uncle of Emperor Higashikuni.

In 1980, as the result of a conflict between Ōtsuka and the Wadōkai organisation over personal withdrawals from the organisation's bank accounts, he stepped down as head of the Wadōkai. Eiichi Eriguchi took over his place within that organisation. On 1 April 1981, Ōtsuka founded the "Wadōryū Karatedō Renmei." (Renmei means "group" or "federation.") After only a few months, he retired as head of this organisation. His son, Jiro Ōtsuka, took his place. On 29 January 1982, Hironori Ōtsuka died, and in 1983, Jiro Ōtsuka succeeded him as grandmaster of Wadō-ryū. The younger Ōtsuka changed his name to "Hironori Otsuka II" in honor of his late father. In 1989, Tatsuo Suzuki founded the third major Wadō-ryū organisation, "Wadō Kokusai" (Wadō International Karatedō Federation; WIKF). (Kokusai means "international.") In 2011 following Suzuki's death, Jon Wicks succeeded as the WIKF chief instructor. In 2015 following Jiro's death, his son Kazutaka succeeded him as grandmaster of Wadō-ryū, assuming the name "Hironori Otsuka III".

== Organisation ==
Wadō-ryū is spread between three independently-led organisations: Wadōkai, Wadō Kokusai and Wadō-ryū Karate-dō Renmei.

=== Wadō-ryū outside Japan ===
Wadō-ryū has been spread to many countries in the world, by both Japanese and non-Japanese students of Hironori Otsuka. Japanese Wadō-ryū stylists Tatsuo Suzuki, Teruo Kono, Masafumi Shiomitsu, H. Takashima, Naoki Ishikawa, Yoshihiko Iwasaki, Kuniaki Sakagami and many others spread the art in Europe. Yoshiaki Ajari, Masaru Shintani and Isaac Henry Jr. spread the art in the United States and Canada, Joaquim Gonçalves (from Portugal) and many others have helped to spread the style in their respective countries. In 1968, Otsuka promoted Cecil T. Patterson of the United States to 5th dan, and charged him with the creation of the United States Eastern Wado-Kai Federation (USEWF).

Following the split between Otsuka and the Wado-Kai in 1980, Patterson and the USEWF (renamed: United States Eastern Wadō-ryū Karate Federation) remained with Otsuka. Following Patterson's death in 2002, his son John T. Patterson assumed the presidency of the USEWF. Patterson's organisation continues as an active member of the Wadō Ryū Karatedō Renmei. In the UK, Wadō-ryū has been cited as a key influence in the development of the hybrid martial art Sanjuro.

== Notable practitioners ==
- Hironori Ōtsuka (founder)
- Tatsuo Suzuki
- Seiji Nishimura
- Masaru Shintani
- Cecil T. Patterson
- Hamish Telfer Adam
- Toru Arakawa
- Steven Bellamy
- Ticky Donovan
- Gilbert Ballantine
- Vic Charles
- Eugene Codrington
- William Millerson
- Hiroo Mochizuki
- Teruo Kono
- Yoshiaki Ajari
- Fukazawa Hiroji
- Patrice Belrhiti
- Koji Takamatsu
