= Tawara gaeshi =

Judo technique

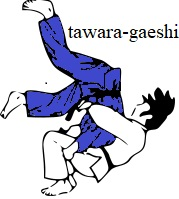
- Classification: Nage-waza
- Sub classification: Sutemi-waza
- Kodokan: Yes

Technique name
- Rōmaji: Tawara gaeshi
- Japanese: 俵返
- English: Rice bag reversal throw

Tawara Gaeshi (俵返) is one of the preserved throwing techniques, Habukareta Waza, of Judo. It belonged to the fourth group, Dai Yonkyo, of the 1895 Gokyo no Waza lists.

It is categorized as a rear sacrifice technique, Ma-sutemi.

== Technique Description ==
As the opponent attempts Morote gari, the defender goes over the shoulders and arms and locks his/her opponents body. The defender, while still holding the body lock tightly, then drops his/her weight down and backwards and uses the leverage from the body lock to fling the opponent behind the defender onto the opponents backside in one fluid motion. When can maintain the body lock all the way through to osaekomi-waza .
