= Kuchiki taoshi =

Judo technique

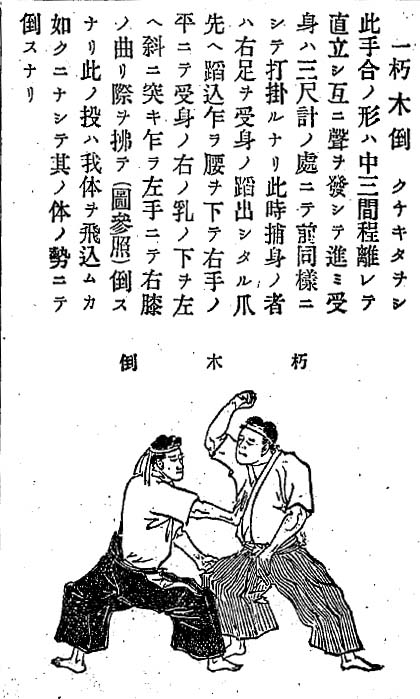
- Kuchiki taoshi in Tenjin Shin'yō-ryū jujutsu
- Classification: Nage-waza
- Sub classification: Te-waza
- Kodokan: Yes

Technique name
- Rōmaji: Kuchiki-taoshi
- Japanese: 朽木倒
- English: Single leg takedown

Kuchiki taoshi (朽木倒) is a single leg takedown in Judo adopted later by the Kodokan into their Shinmeisho No Waza (newly accepted techniques) list. It is categorized as a hand technique, Te-waza.

The technique was popularized by Kyutaro Kanda in 1926. Yaichihyōe Kanemitsu criticized it as a takedown lacking finesse, but included it in his acumen nonetheless.

== Technique Description ==
Kuchiki taoshi is sometimes translated as "dead tree drop". In this throw the leg of the opponent is grabbed with one arm while pushing him onto his back.

== Included Systems ==
Systems:

- Kodokan Judo, List of Kodokan Judo techniques

Lists:

- The Canon Of Judo
- Judo technique
