= Ticky Donovan =

British karateka and coach

- Born: David Donovan; 13 November 1947 (age 78); Loughton, England
- Style: Karate
- Teachers: Tatsuo Suzuki, Hirokazu Kanazawa, Keinosuke Enoeda, Mas Oyama

Other information
- Website: Official site

David 'Ticky' Donovan OBE (born 1947) is a British karate competitor and coach. He was the coach and manager of both the British and English national karate teams, from 1977 until he retired from that role in 2008. During his tenure as coach, Britain won numerous European and World championship team gold medals. It was for his achievements as a coach that he was awarded the O.B.E. in 1991. Ticky Donovan currently holds a 10th Dan black belt. He is based in Loughton, Essex.

In 1973, Donovan formed his own style of karate known as Ishinryu, which means 'All of one Heart'. This style has had significant competition success over the years and continues to be practised at a number of UK clubs, as well as in Australia, Canada and New Zealand.

On 28 March 2009, Karate England held a testimonial evening for Donovan, with many senior karateka present, including Steve Arneil, Dave Hazard, Tyrone Whyte, and Aiden Trimble.

== Early days ==
Ticky Donovan attended his first Karate lesson aged eighteen in 1965, at Tatsuo Suzuki's Clapham Common club. Having previously trained in boxing, Donovan found karate 'slow' and was ready to quit after his first lesson. I However, he changed his mind after seeing a dynamic demonstration from the legendary Tatsuo Suzuki himself, and from that point on, he was hooked. Donovan stayed with Wado Ryu for over three years, training with Tatsuo Suzuki and Len Palmer.

When Mister Suzuki and Len Palmer unfortunately parted company, both men wanted him to stay with them and Donovan's loyalties were split, as Mr Suzuki was a great instructor and Len Palmer had helped Donovan in various ways. Donovan stayed with Len but did not forget Mr Suzuki and the fundamentals he had been taught. When Mr Kanazawa came over, the group switched to Shotokan, and at this point, Donovan trained with Kanazawa and Enoeda but fate was to play a hand again as Mr Kanazawa went to Germany and Mr Enoeda to Liverpool. To make matters worse, Donovan broke a bone in his hand at the selections for the European Championships and decided to give up karate completely.

After six months out of the Dojo, Donovan got 'the bug' once more, and the nearest Karate club to him was Steve Arneil's Kyokushinkai dojo in Stratford, where a lot of his friends trained. Donovan found the atmosphere electric, changed to Kyokushinkai and trained in the style for nearly four years, taking his second Dan with Mas Oyama.

== The birth of Ishinryu ==
The Kyokushinkai years were a great time for Donovan, but unfortunately splits came, and so Donovan decided the time was right to leave and open his own Dojo, a Dojo that saw the beginning of the now famous Ishinryu style. Donovan remembers that he wanted a name that meant "open mind" but when translated it came out as "empty head" and the idea was quickly scrapped. Meeting a Japanese Judoka while on holiday, he came up with the name 'Ishinryu' meaning "everybody with one heart". Donovan asked if there was an Ishinryu style in Japan, and he said no, and Ishinryu was born (can easily be confused with the Okinawan Isshin-ryu karate system), recognised by The World Karate Federation.

At first, Donovan simply used 'Ishinryu' as a club name. However inspired by the suggestion of Shigeru Kimura (a famous Shūkōkai instructor), Ishinryu was incorporated as a style integrating what Donovan had learnt from previous karate instructors – Ishinryu became a unique style developed from Kyokushinkai, Wado-ryu and Shotokan.

The first Ishinryu club was formed in Dagenham. Other clubs soon emerged with Peter Dennis opening an Ishinryu club in Basildon; Will Verner opening in East Ham; and Tyrone White opening in Stratford. Administration in the early days of Ishinryu was taken care of by Fred Kidd, a well-respected friend of Ticky's who had previously trained with him in Kyokushinkai.

== Ishinryu today ==
Donovan still plays a very active role is running the style he formed in 1973. The original Dagenham Ishinryu Dojo still exists as the Woodlane Club and has been joined by many others in the UK and abroad. Today, Ishinryu Karate is taught as far afield as Australia, New Zealand, and Canada.

Since 1976, Donovan has hosted an annual Open Summer Course at Clacton in Essex. This course takes place in the last week of June.

Donovan's style of Ishinryu should not be confused with Isshin-ryu, a style of Okinawan karate founded by Tatsuo Shimabuku.

== Achievements as competitor ==
- British champion 1973, 1974, 1975
- World team champion 1975

== Achievements as British team coach ==
- Consecutive World championship titles: Taipei 1982, Holland 1984, Australia 1986, Cairo 1988, Mexico 1990
