= Yōshin Koryū =

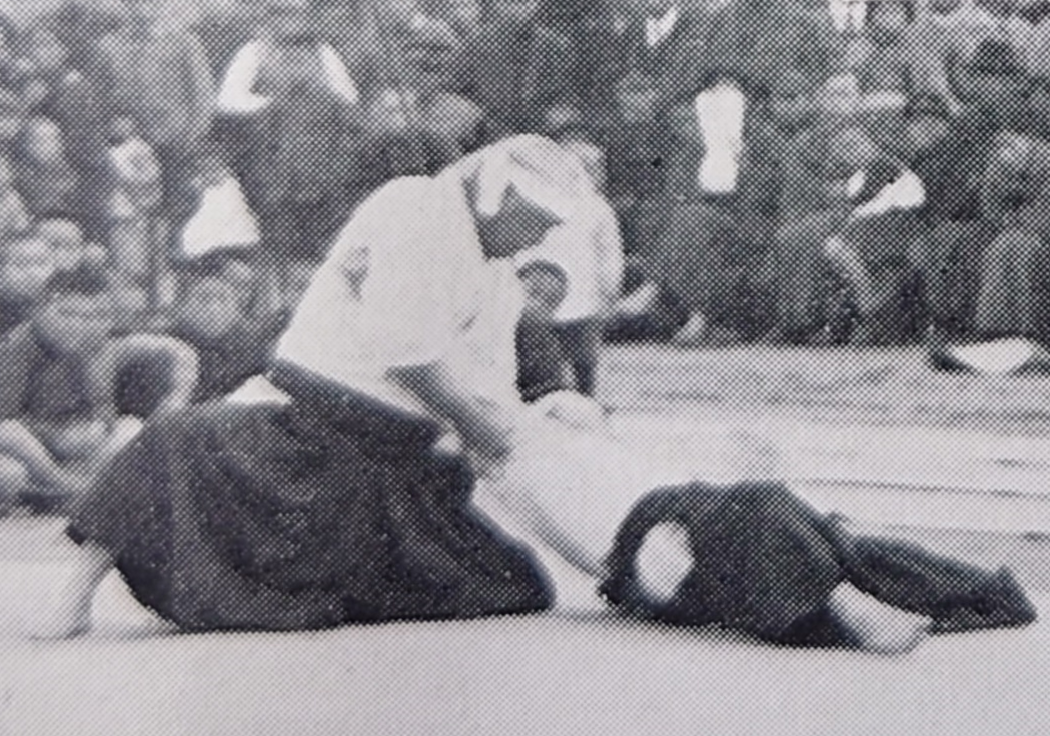
Yōshin jujutsu exhibition, Motojuro Kanaya vs. Yoshio Sugino.

The oldest line of Yōshin-ryū (楊心流) is probably the school founded by Nakamura Sakyōdayū Yoshikuni around 1610, and is often referred to as Yōshin Koryū (楊心古流). Nakamura later changed his name to Miura Yōshin (三浦 楊心), and this school may also be referred to as Miura-ryū (三浦流), or Miura Yōshin-ryū (三浦楊心流). This line has a historical connection to the Takeda family through the founder's grandfather, Nakamura Yorifusa. Yorifusa was a retainer of the Koshu Takeda who founded a school of jujutsu called Taiyo ryu. Yoshin Koryu was founded by Nakamura Yoshikuni in Nagasaki after being driven from Takeda lands by Tokugawa Ieyasu. It is stated that Yoshin Koryu was a mixture of Taiyo ryu and knowledge gained by Yoshikuni’s exposure to Chinese martial arts and medicine, knowledge gained while living in Nagasaki and in nearby Miura village.

== History ==
An area of confusion concerning this school is its founding in Nagasaki, where the more ubiquitous school using the name of Yōshin-ryū (Akiyama line) and another school named Miura ryu was founded. This other Miura ryu was founded by Miura Yojuiemon of the Fukuno ryu jujutsu lineages. This school was reportedly influenced by the Chinese martial artist and scholar, Chin Genpin. It is possible there was cross pollination between all these schools that all reportedly were in existence in Nagasaki in the first half of the 17th century.

This school survived 11 generations. Hikosuke Totsuka was a celebrated master, creating the Totsuka-ha lineage. The last fully licensed actively teaching instructor of Yoshin Koryu ryu jujutsu, however, was Kanaya Motoyoshi, son of Kanaya Motojuro who died in the early 20th century. With his death the Yoshin Koryu jujutsu school lost transmission and no longer exists. Densho were apparently passed on to a 12th generation headmaster but the waza are no longer practiced.

The various names used for this school:

Yoshin Koryu, Miura Yoshin ryu, Miura ryu, Yoshin ryu, and Totsuka ha Yoshin ryu.

Schools influenced by Yoshin Koryu:

Tenshin Yoshin ryu, Shindo Yoshin ryu, Takamura ha Shindo Yoshin ryu, and Kodokan Judo.
