= Masaru Shintani =

Canadian kareteka

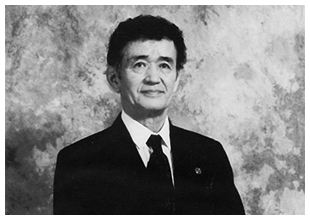
- Born: February 3, 1928; Vancouver, British Columbia, Canada
- Died: May 7, 2000 (aged 72); Kapuskasing, Ontario, Canada; Heart Attack
- Style: Wadō-ryū, Shōrin-ryū Karate
- Teachers: Hironori Ohtsuka, Akira Kitigawa
- Rank: 9th dan karate

Other information
- Website: Official site

Masaru Shintani (February 3, 1928 – May 7, 2000) was a Japanese-Canadian master of karate who introduced the Wadō-ryū style of karate in Canada and founded the Shintani Wado-Kai Karate Federation.

At the time of his death he was the Supreme Instructor of Wado Kai Karate in North America. Shintani devoted over 50 years to the study of Karate. He also held ranks in Judo (Sandan), Aikido (Shodan), and Kendo (Shodan).

== Early life ==
Shintani was born February 3, 1928, in Vancouver, British Columbia, Canada, the eldest child of six born to Kanaye Shintani and Tsuruye Shintani (Matsumoto) of the Matsumoto samurai family. Shintani's father died when he was only seven years old.

At the start of World War II, all Canadians of Japanese descent were sent to relocation centres throughout the country. Shintani and his family were sent to New Denver, British Columbia.

Shintani's early martial arts training was in the relocation camps at the age of 14, studying judo, kendo and aikido.

In 1947, Shintani and his family moved to Beamsville, Ontario. In 1952 he formed his first karate club at the Hamilton, Ontario YMCA.

== Shōrin-ryū Karate ==
Some time in the early 1940s, Shintani and a group of boys from the relocation camp were looking for a place to play hockey when they came across Akira Kitagawa practicing Shōrin-ryū karate, using a tree as a makiwara.

Kitagawa invited them to try his sport, which he simply called 'kumite'. Shintani trained with Kitagawa for 20 years, and when Kitagawa died, Shintani began searching for another teacher.

== Wadō-ryū Karate ==
In the mid-1950s, during a trip to Japan to compete in a karate tournament, Shintani met Hironori Ohtsuka. After this meeting, Shintani and Ohtsuka began to develop a very close relationship. He once said to Shintani "you come from a fine grain". Shintani would make regular trips to Japan to learn from Ohtsuka, and Ohtsuka visited Shintani in Canada during several of his international trips.

Sometime in early 1970, Ohtsuka asked Shintani to officially call his style Wadō-ryū, and asked Shintani to continue to develop Wadō-ryū in Canada. In a letter written by Ohtsuka to Shintani dated July 14, 1974, Ohtsuka said "Please take care of the Canadian Wado Kai as its representative". Shintani accepted this honour, and subsequently became the head of all Wado Karate-do in North America and was conferred the title of Supreme Instructor. In 1979, Ohtsuka presented Shintani with his 8th dan, and also gave him a post-dated 9th dan certificate for the future. Shintani revealed his 9th dan certificate in 1995.

== Shindō ==
One night, Shintani had a dream that he was fighting a swordsman, and the only weapon he had was a short stick. In his dream, he was able to defeat the swordsman with this stick. This dream is what inspired him to develop Shindō or "the straight/pure way".

Shindō incorporates the techniques and applications of Wado-ryu karate. Shintani developed Shindō with the idea that the same techniques could be used either empty handed, or with a Shindō, a stick approximately 36-inches in length, essentially a shortened Bō staff. Shintani began teaching Shindō to his students in the early 1980s.

== Later life ==
In the last years before his death, Shintani spent much of his time developing Karate and Shindō concepts and travelled to various regions of North America and overseas to conduct seminars.

On April 29, 2000, Shintani travelled to Kapuskasing, Ontario to conduct some Karate seminars. On May 6, 2000, he had a mild heart attack and was taken to Kapuskasing Hospital where his condition was stabilized. The next day, with his condition being upgraded to stable, the doctors decided to have Shintani returned to Hamilton via air-ambulance to be under his physician's care.

Shortly after take-off, Shintani had a massive heart attack. The air-ambulance returned to Kapuskasing Hospital where Shintani was declared deceased.

== Legacy ==
Three separate groups continue to teach Wadō-ryū karate as passed down from Sensei Ohtsuka to Sensei Shintani.

- Shintani Wado Kai Karate Federation (SWKKF) - the largest of the three groups, representing approximately 94 clubs.
- Wado Karate Association of Canada - representing 12 clubs.
- World Congress Karate Shintani
