= Tatsuo Suzuki (martial artist) =

Japanese karate grandmaster

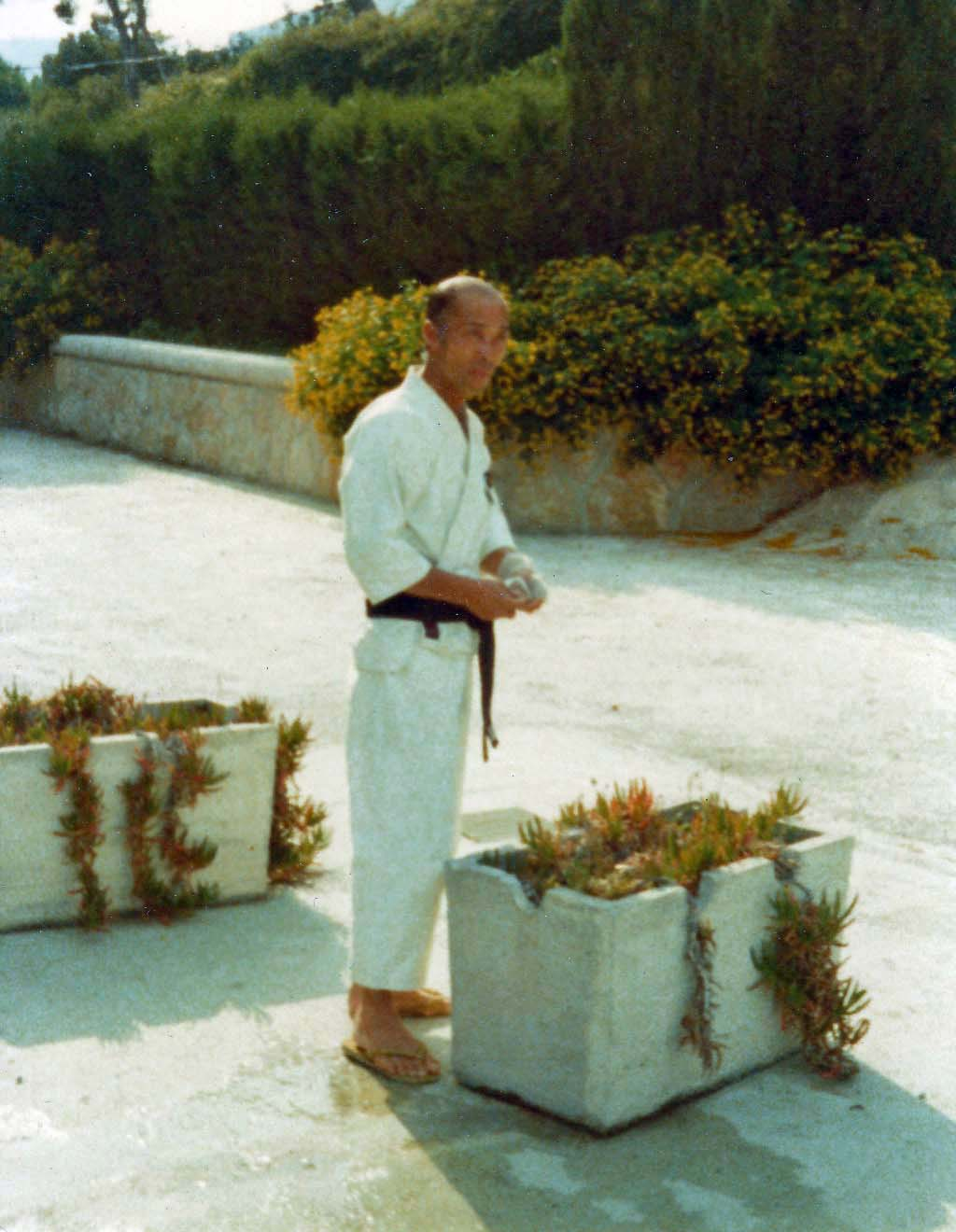
- Born: April 27, 1928; Yokohama, Japan
- Died: July 12, 2011 (aged 83); London, England
- Style: Wadō-ryū karate
- Teacher: Hironori Ōtsuka
- Rank: 8th dan karate hanshi

Other information
- Spouse: Mineko Suzuki (1961–1996) Eleni Labiri Suzuki
- Notable students: Ticky Donovan; Peter Spanton; Kenneth Corrigan
- Website: Wado International Karate-Do Federation (WIKF)

Tatsuo Suzuki (鈴木 達夫, Suzuki Tatsuo; April 27, 1928 – July 12, 2011) Yokohama, Japan was an 8th Dan Japanese karateka instrumental in spreading the martial art of Wadō-ryū karate to Europe and the United States.

== Early life ==
Tatsuo Suzuki as a child had a keen interest in kendo and judo, and at the age of 14, he began studying karate, under Hironori Ōtsuka, the founder of Wado Ryu karate. After six years of studying karate Tatsuo Suzuki obtained his 3ºDan, and in 1951 he was awarded 5th Dan, the top grade in Wado Ryu at that time. Complementing the karate he was 2ºDan in Tenshin Horyu Bojutsu and 1º Dan in judo. He also studied Zen doctrine with the high priest Genpo Yamamoto and Soyen Nakagawa.

In 1975 he received the 8th Dan, the highest grade of the Japan Karate Federation and the Wadōkai. In that year, he also received the highest the title "Hanshi". In Wado-ryu; the only other person with that title was Hironori Ōtsuka.

== Wadō-ryū ==
In 1963, Hironori Ōtsuka dispatched Suzuki, along with Toru Arakawa and Hajime Takashima, to spread Wadō-ryū around the world.

From 1956 to 1964, Suzuki formed the first Wado-Ryu Federation in England and from his base in London expanded throughout Europe. He brought students from Japan, taught them how to be instructors, and sent to various countries in Europe. In a few years, the Wado-Ryu became a very popular karate style in Europe .

In 1991, Suzuki decided to form his own federation to safeguard the essence of Wado Ryu as he was taught by his teacher Ōtsuka. He formed the Wado International Karate-Do Federation (WIKF).

Tatsuo Suzuki died on July 12, 2011.

== Bibliography ==
- Karate-Do by Tatsuo Suzuki, editions Pelham Books Ltd ISBN 0-7207-0144-9
- Suzuki: The Fullness of a Life in Karate by Tatsuo Suzuki, Xlibris, 2009, ISBN 3-9804461-0-7 (self-published)
