= Hironori Ōtsuka =

Japanese karateka

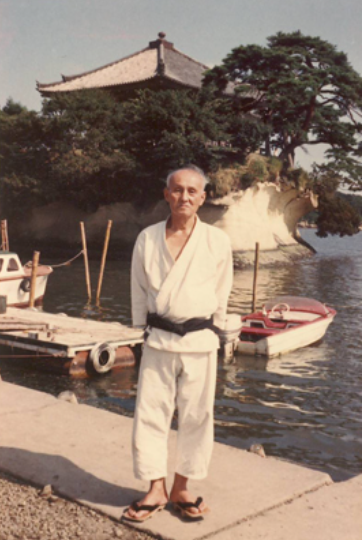
- Born: June 1, 1892; Shimodate, Ibaraki Prefecture, Japan
- Died: January 29, 1982 (aged 89); Japan
- Other names: Hironori Ohtsuka
- Style: Wadō-ryū Karate (founder); Shotokan, Shitō-ryū, Motobu-ryū, Jujutsu (Shindō Yōshin-ryū, others)
- Teachers: Tatsusaburo Nakayama, Gichin Funakoshi, Kenwa Mabuni, Chōki Motobu
- Rank: 10th dan karate meijin

Other information
- Notable students: Masaru Shintani, Tatsuo Suzuki
- Website: Official site

Hironori Ōtsuka (大塚 博紀, Ōtsuka Hironori; June 1, 1892 – January 29, 1982)^{[a]} was a Japanese master of karate who created the Wadō-ryū style of karate. He was the first Grand Master of Wadō-ryū karate, and received high awards within Japan for his contributions to karate.

== Early life ==
Ōtsuka was born on June 1, 1892, in Shimodate City, Ibaraki, Japan. He was one of four children to Tokujiro Ōtsuka, a medical doctor. At the age of 5 years, he began training in the martial art of jujutsu under his great-uncle, Chojiro Ebashi (a samurai). Ōtsuka's father took over his martial arts education in 1897. At the age of 13, Ōtsuka became the student of Tatsusaburo Nakayama in Shindō Yōshin-ryū jujutsu.

In 1911, while studying business administration at Waseda University in Tokyo, Ōtsuka trained in various jujutsu schools in the area. Before his studies were complete, his father died and he was unable to continue studying; he commenced work as a clerk at the Kawasaki Bank. Although he wished to become a full-time instructor, he did not pursue this course at this point out of respect for his mother's wishes.

== Shotokan karate ==
On June 1, 1921 , Ōtsuka received the menkyo kaiden (certificate of mastery and licence to teach) in Shindō Yōshin-ryū jujutsu from Tatsusaburo Nakayama. While a valid licence, a common misconception is that along with this certificate he became the "4th grandmaster" of Shindō Yōshin-ryū. This is inaccurate – the 3rd grandmaster (Tatsuo Matsuoka) actually outlived Ōtsuka by almost 8 years.

Jujutsu was not to become his primary art, however; in 1922, Ōtsuka began training in Shotokan karate under Gichin Funakoshi, who was a new arrival in Japan. In 1927, he also established a medical practice and specialised in treating martial arts training injuries.

By 1928, Ōtsuka was an assistant instructor in Funakoshi's school. He also trained under Chōki Motobu and Kenwa Mabuni, and studied kobudo, around this time. Ōtsuka began to have philosophical disagreements with Funakoshi, and the two men parted ways in the early 1930s. This may have come, in part, from his decision to train with Motobu. Funakoshi's karate emphasized kata, a series of movements and techniques linked by the fighting principles. Funakoshi did not believe that sparring was necessary for realistic training. Motobu, however, emphasized the necessity of free application, and created a series of two-person kumite called yakusoku kumite.

== Wado-ryu karate ==
On April 1, 1934, Ōtsuka opened his own karate school the Dai Nippon Karate Shinko Kai at 63 Banchi Suehiro-Cho, Kanda, Tokyo. He blended Shotokan karate with his knowledge of Shindō Yōshin-ryū jujutsu to form Wadō-ryū karate, although the art would only later take on this name several years later. With recognition of his style as an independent karate style, Ōtsuka became a full-time instructor. In 1940, his style was registered at the Butokukai, Kyoto, for the demonstration of various martial arts, together with Shotokan, Shitō-ryū, and Gōjū-ryū.

Following World War II, the practice of martial arts in Japan was banned. After a few years, however, the ban was lifted; through the 1950s, Ōtsuka held various karate competitions. In 1964, three of Ōtsuka's students Tatsuo Suzuki, Toru Arakawa, and Hajime Takashima) from Nihon University toured Europe and the United States of America, demonstrating Wadō-ryū karate.

== Later life ==
On April 29, 1966, Emperor Hirohito awarded Ōtsuka the Order of the Rising Sun, Fifth Class for his contributions to karate. In the next few years, Ōtsuka wrote two books on karate: Karate-Do, Volume 1 (1967, focused on kata) and Karate-Do, Volume 2 (1970, focused on kumite). On October 9, 1972, the Kokusai Budoin International Martial Arts Federation (IMAF Japan) awarded Ōtsuka the title of Shodai Karate-do Meijin Judan (first-generation karate master 10th dan); this was the first time this honour had been bestowed on a karate practitioner.

On March 22, 1970, Ōtsuka was presented with the key to the City of Niagara Falls, NY. Mayor E. Dent Lackey awarded Ōtsuka with the key to the city which was presented to Ōtsuka by one of his students (Robert Heisner, a Niagara Falls resident) who had recently been promoted to Nidan - Second Dan Black Belt by Ōtsuka.

Ōtsuka continued to teach and lead Wadō-ryū karate into the 1980s, and died on January 29, 1982. In 1983, his son, Jiro Ohtsuka, became the second Grand Master of Wadō-ryū karate and honoured his father by taking the name "Hironori Ōtsuka II."

== Notes ==
a. Ōtsuka's surname is sometimes also spelled as Ohtsuka.
