= Yoshimura Chōgi (karate master) =

Okinawan karate master

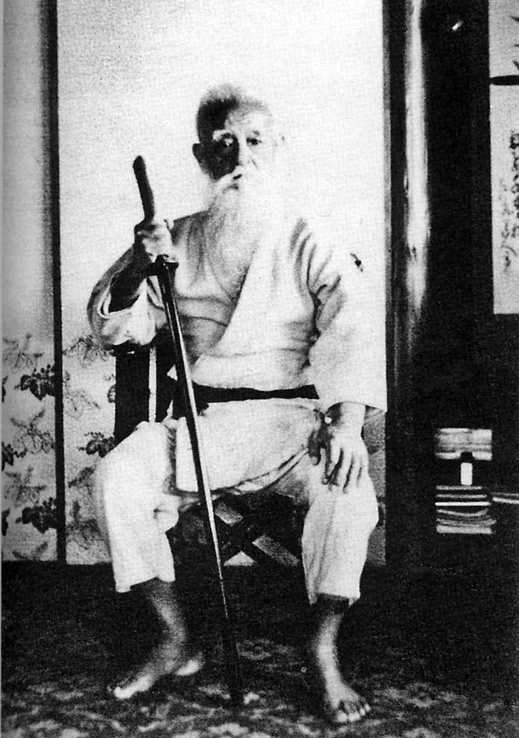
Yoshimura Chōgi

Yoshimura Chōgi (義村 朝義; 1866–1945) was a karate master (soke) of Okinawa.

He was born in the closing years of the Ryūkyū Kingdom to the Ryūkyū family, and he was the 4th head of the Yoshimura Udun (義村御殿). He was the second son of Yoshimura Chōmei. His mother was the eldest daughter of Prince Ie Chōchoku. In addition, Chōgi was the cousin of Motobu Chōki of the Motobu Udun. He was born to such a noble family that he had opportunities to learn karate from many famous masters. He learned Shuri-te from Matsumura Sōkon, and Naha-te from Higaonna Kanryō.

In his later years, he moved to Tokyo and Osaka, where he lived the lifestyle of a literary person, enjoying Bōjutsu, Kenjutsu, calligraphy and painting. On March 14, 1945 (Shōwa 20), he died in Osaka during an air raid. His age of death was 80 years.

In 1979 (Shōwa 54), paintings and calligraphic works of Chōgi were donated by his bereaved family to the Okinawa Prefectural Museum, and in 1981 (Shōwa 56), the museum held the “Yoshimura Chōgi Exhibition.”
