= Yoshimura Chōgi =

Yoshimura Chōgi may refer to:

- Yoshimura Chōgi (prince)
- Yoshimura Chōgi (karate master)
