= Motobu Udun Tomb =

Turtleback tomb in Okinawa Prefecture, Japan

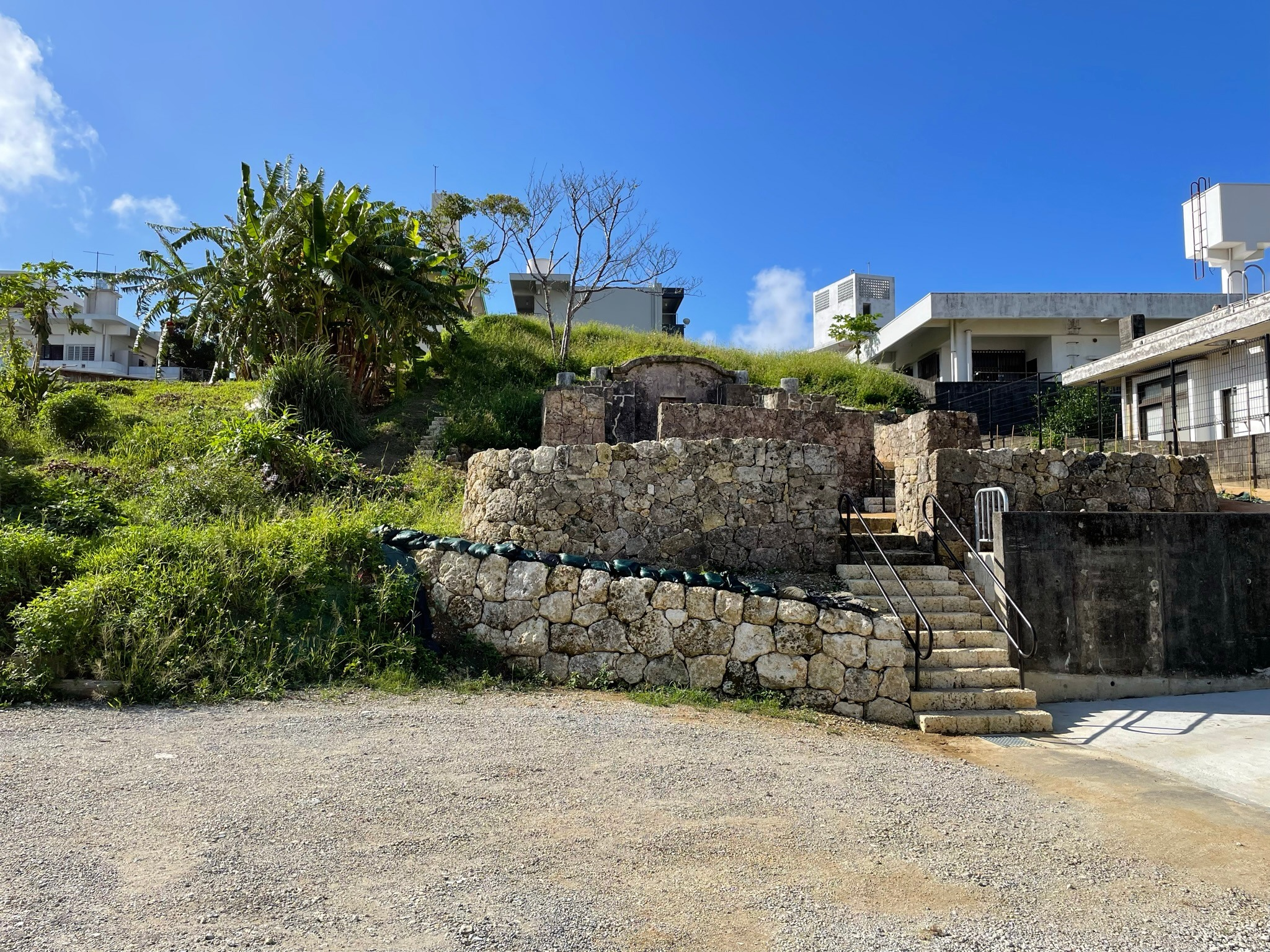
Full side view of the Motobu Udun Tomb

The Motobu Udun Tomb (Japanese: 本部御殿墓; Motobu Udun-baka, Okinawan: Mutubu udun baka) is a turtleback tomb (亀甲墓, kamekōbaka; Okinawan: kāminukūbaka) located in Ganeko in today's Ginowan City, Okinawa Prefecture, Japan. The tomb belongs to the House of Motobu whose origin is Prince Motobu Chōhei (本部朝平, aka Shō Kōshin 尚弘信, 1655–1687), the 6th son of the 10th King Shō Shitsu (1629–1668) of the Second Royal Shō Dynasty of Ryūkyū.

== Overview ==
=== Construction time ===
According to a description in the "Records of the Royal Era" (王代記, Ōdai-ki) of the Second Royal Shō Dynasty, “the remains originally enshrined in Sueyoshi in Shuri were transferred to Ganeko.” According to this, the tomb was likely built after 1694, when founder Chōhei's bones were washed before placing them in the burial urn.

=== Architectural elements ===
Both ends of the tomb's “eyebrow” (Okinawan: 眉, romanized: mayu) are gently curved and similar to other ancient turtleback tombs which have been reconstructed in the city area until now. The front of the burial chamber is laid out in cut-stone masonry (相方積み, aikata-zumi), a method of stacking stones by carving them so that they mesh with each other while utilizing the natural shape of the stones. Its left and right sleeve stones (Okinawan: 袖石, romanized: sudi-ishi) are made of two layers of “cloth piling” (布積み, nunozumi), in which rows of stones are horizontally laid on top of one another, so called because they resemble woven fabric (nuno), and the turtleback of the upper part of the tomb is also entirely covered with stones. In addition, curb stones are arranged so as to surround the entire tomb, and the top part is further paved with stones.

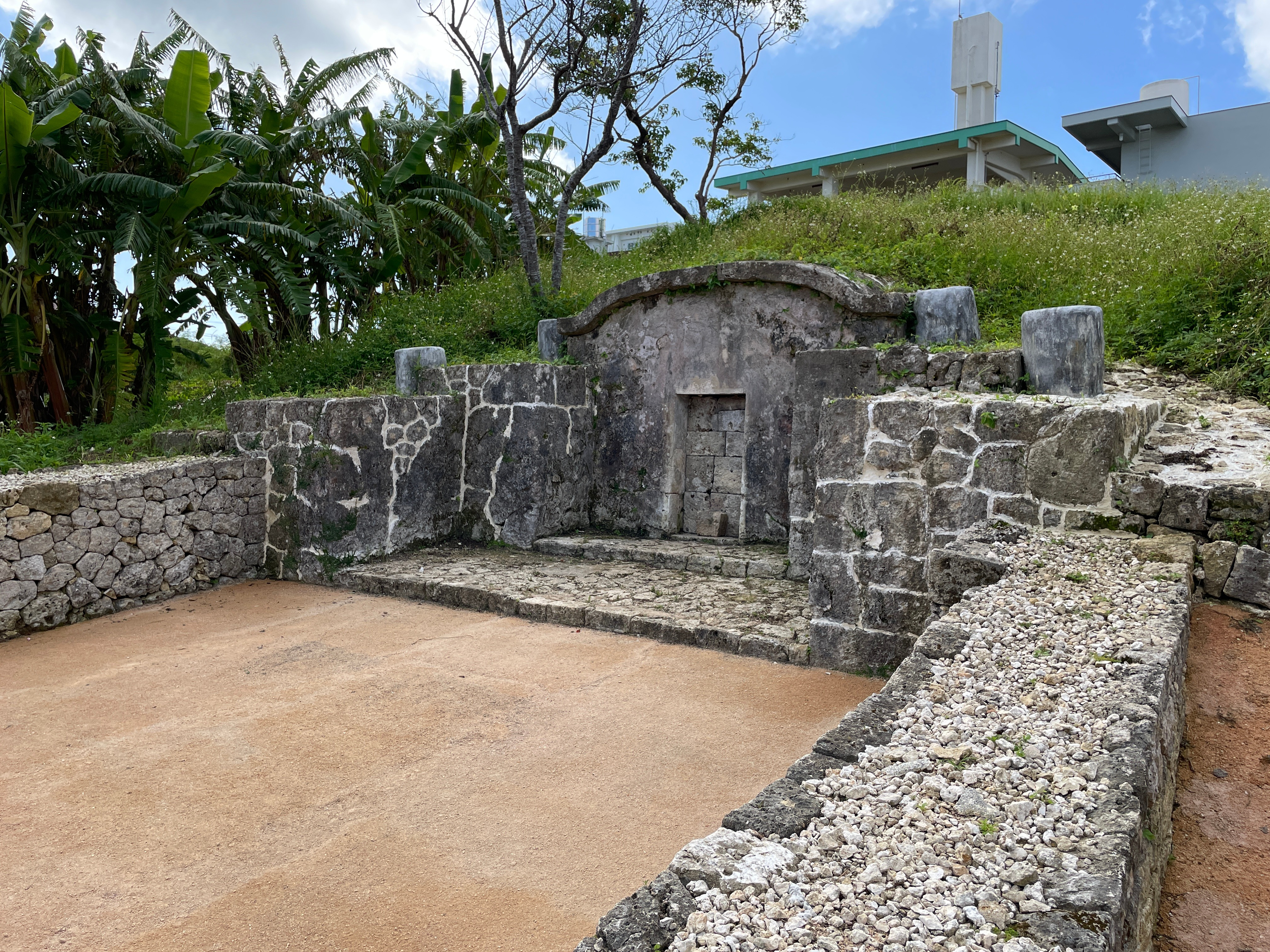
The inner yard of the Motobu Udun Tomb

=== Design ===
The graveyard is divided into an inner (first) yard and an outer (second) yard. The inner (first) yard is the open area in front of the entrance to the burial chamber and is elevated from the outer yard by about of 1 m, which is similar to the Ginowan Udun Tomb. The height difference from the graveyard entrance (outer yard) to the front of the burial chamber (inner yard) is believed to represent the high social status of the deceased as a member of the royal family, and the high prestige of the Motobu Udun.

The interior of the burial chamber has an arched ceiling, with an elevated ledge on each side, and a total of ten carved and decorated zushigame pottery burial urns for storing the bones (Okinawan: 厨子甕, romanized: jīshigāmi) have been confirmed. From the inscription engraved on the bone containers made of limestone in the center of the inner ledge, it is surmised that the remains of Prince Motobu Chōhei, the founder of the House of Motobu, and his wife are enshrined here.

=== Area ===
The private road that remained on the north side of the graveyard entrance is not straight but bends at right angles at about every ten meters, and according to the tradition handed down in the family, the grave site was about 6,600 m^{2}, so the cemetery area was quite large at the time of construction, and the above-mentioned private road was originally located within the cemetery area. Therefore, it is thought that the approach to the tomb had the function of repelling evil spirits (ヤナムンゲーシ yanamungēshi).

== Significance as a Cultural Property ==
The Motobu Udun Tomb is considered extremely valuable for research on the relationship between the royal family and the Ginowan District of the time, the construction of ancient turtleback tombs, and their transformations.

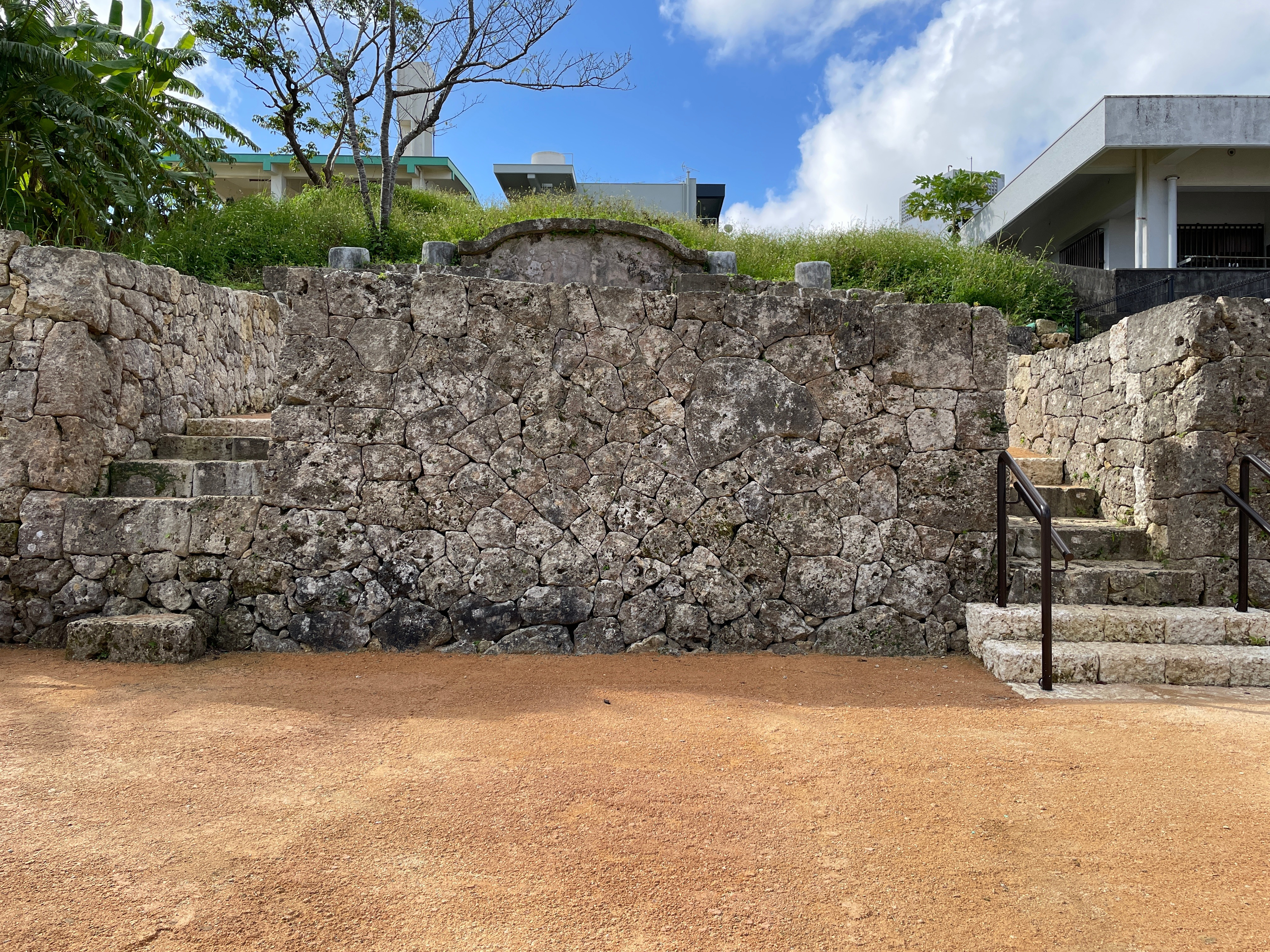
Outer yard of the Motobu Udun Tomb, stairs leading up to the inner yard.

=== Designation as a Cultural Property of Ginowan City ===
On February 25, 2021, the Motobu Udun Tomb was designated as a Cultural Property of Ginowan City in the category of historical sites. It is a recognition of its high value as a material that unravels the relationship between Ginowan District and royal descendants at that time.

The designation criteria are described in the “Guidelines for Criteria for the Designation and Accreditation of Cultural Properties of Ginowan City” (Ginowan City Board of Education, Directive No. 6). It defines “Criteria for the designation as a city-designated historic site, place of scenic beauty, or natural monument,” and includes “Tombs and stone monuments bearing an inscription” among the “”Historic Sites” which are “indispensable for a correct understanding of the history of Ginowan and that have academic value in terms of scale, remains, excavated artifacts, etc.”

== Location, and things to observe when visiting ==
The Motobu Udun Tomb is located in Ganeko, on a hill on the south side of Shiinomi Nursery School, across the road from Okinawa Hospital, near the border between Ginowan City and Nishihara Town.

The full address is: 2 Chome-9 Ganeko, Ginowan, Okinawa 901–2214, Japan (see here for the location on Google Maps).

Ginowan City advises visitors to not use the passage from Prefectural Route 34 and the area around the grave, since these are private properties. Instead, to enter the Motobu Udun Tomb, walk along the street at Shiinomi Nursery School and follow the two blue and white road signs that say “Motobu-udun Tomb.”

== Notable family members ==
Among the family members best known today are Motobu Chōyū and his younger brother Motobu Chōki. Both are well known for their activities in Okinawan martial arts of the late 19th and early 20th century.

== See also ==
- For the Motobu-ryū of karate, see Motobu-ryū
- For a description of cultural property in Japan, see Cultural Property (Japan)
- For a description of monuments of Japan, see Monuments of Japan
