= Turtleback tomb =

Song Dynasty tomb

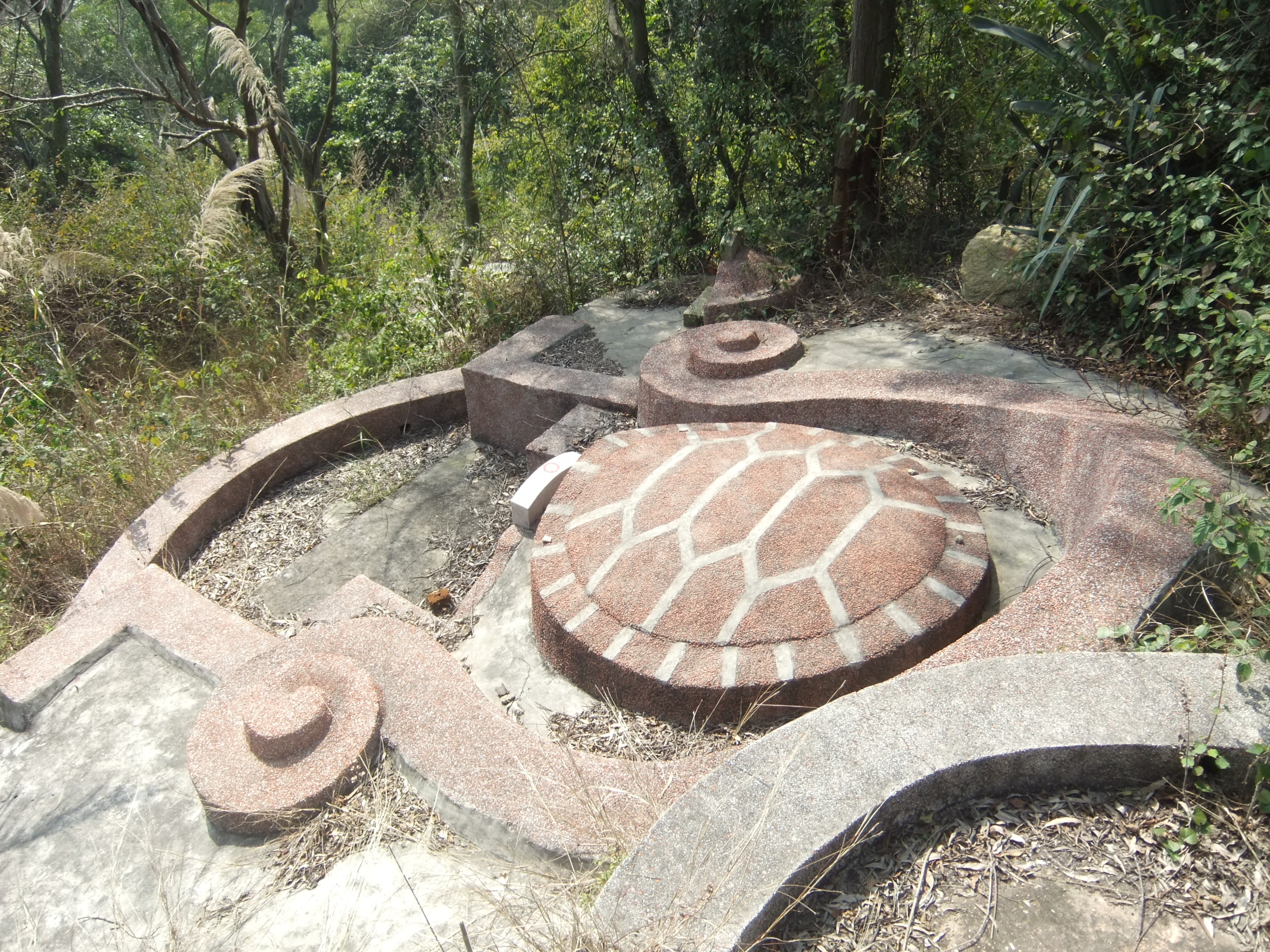
A typical turtle-back tomb, in Lingshan Islamic Cemetery, Quanzhou

Turtleback tombs or turtle shell tombs (simplified Chinese: 龟壳墓; traditional Chinese: 龜殼墓; pinyin: guī ké mù; Pe̍h-ōe-jī: ku-khak-bōng; Okinawan: カーミナクーバカ, kaaminakuubaka) are a particular type of tombs originating from the Song dynasty. They are commonly found in some coastal provinces of southern China (Zhejiang, Fujian, Guangdong), the Ryukyu Islands of Japan, and in Vietnam. They can also be found in countries with overseas Chinese populations like Malaysia.

In the Chinese version, the tomb itself is made to look like the carapace of a tortoise; the vertical tombstone with the name of the deceased is put where the tortoise would have had its head, at the end of the grave where the feet of the buried body are. The tomb is surrounded by an Ω-shaped ridge, with its opening on the side where the tortoise's head would have been and where the tombstone is.

The Ryukyuan version has the same overall shape and layout, but on a much greater scale. The body of the "tortoise" serves as a family burial vault.

== Significance ==
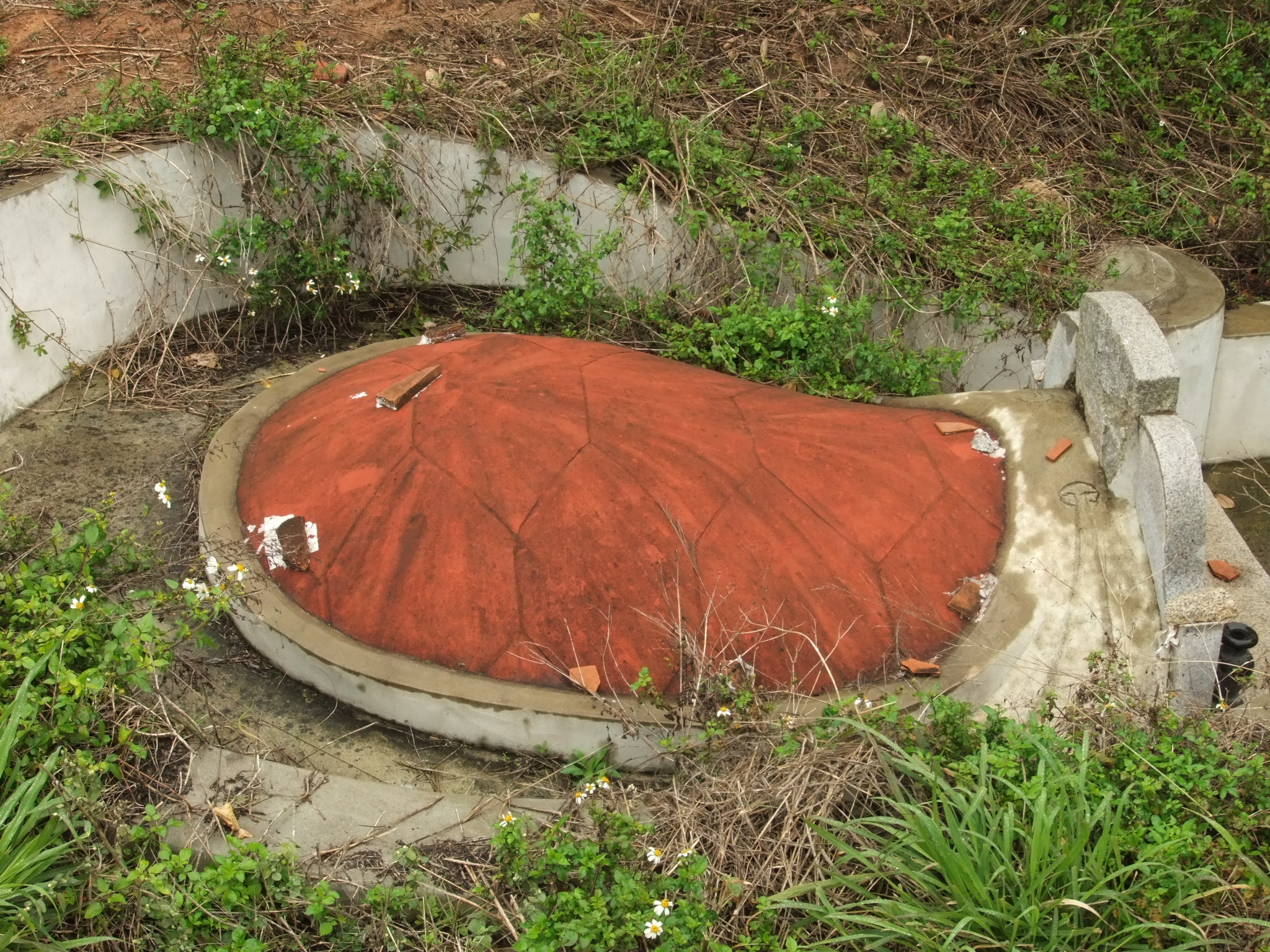
A typical turtle-back tomb in Kinmen Island off Fujian coast

According to J. J. M. de Groot, the main purpose of the horseshoe-shaped or, more frequently, omega-shaped ridge surrounding the tomb is to substitute for a range of hill ridges which, according to the principles of feng shui, need to protect the grave from the "noxious winds" from the three sides – the situation that is rarely naturally obtainable.

The tumulus over the tomb naturally has a somewhat turtle-like shape, considering the large size of a traditional Chinese coffin, its shape, and the shallowness of the grave. However, the tumulus is often actually covered with plaster (or, these days, concrete), decorated in such a way as to remind one of the pattern seen on a tortoise shell.

It is commonly said that the tomb imitates the shape of a tortoise due to those animals' longevity, thus promising long life to the descendants of the deceased. It has been suggested (among others, by J.J.M. de Groot) that the custom of building turtle-shaped tombs may also have to do with the desire to place the grave under the influence of the heavenly warrior Xuanwu, whose symbol is the Black Tortoise.

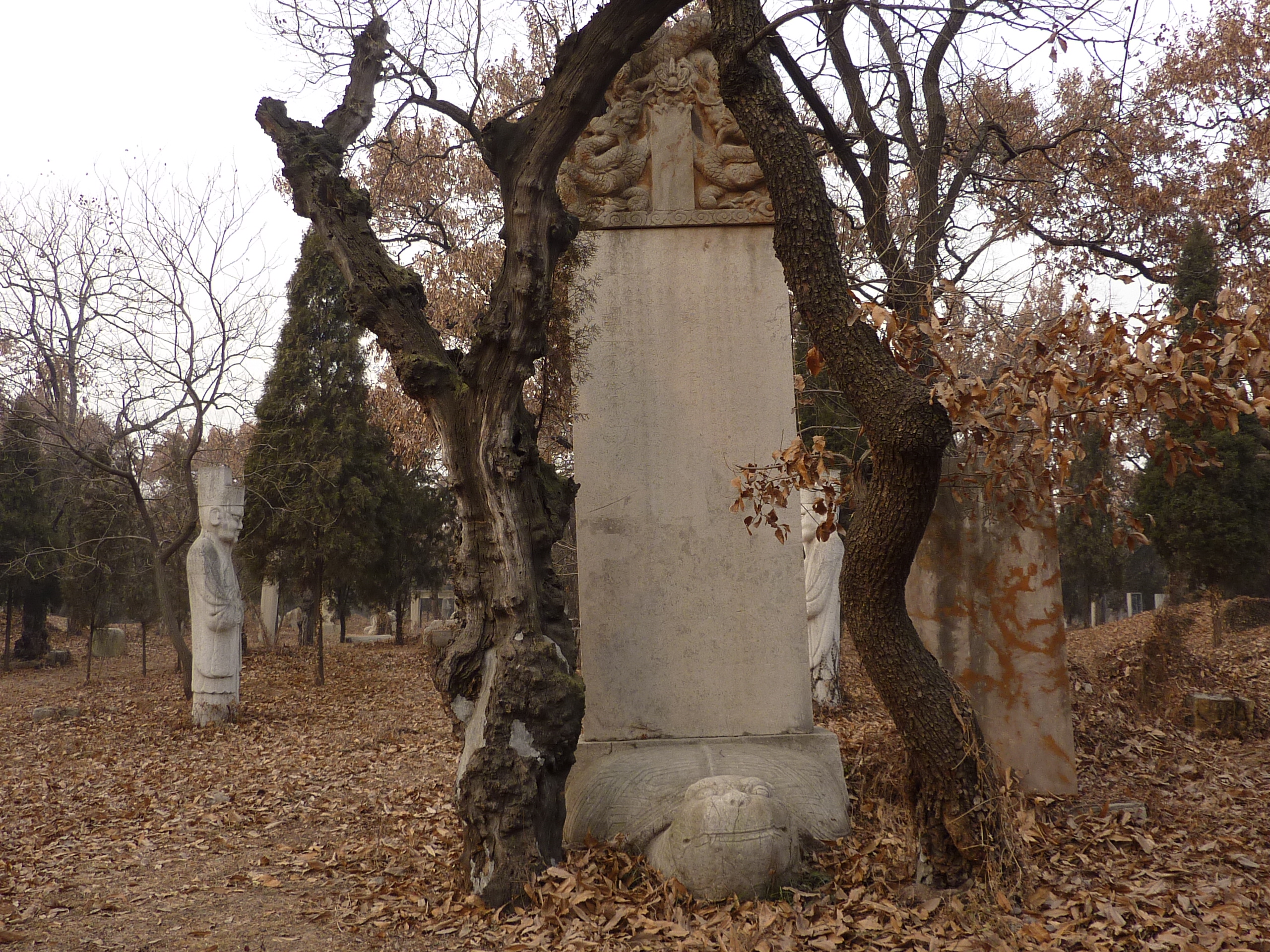
A typical 15th-century bixi, near the tomb of Kong Hongtai, 61st-generation Duke Yansheng, in the Cemetery of Confucius, Qufu. In this traditional layout, the bixi is at the beginning of the spirit way, and the grave tumulus, at the end of it.

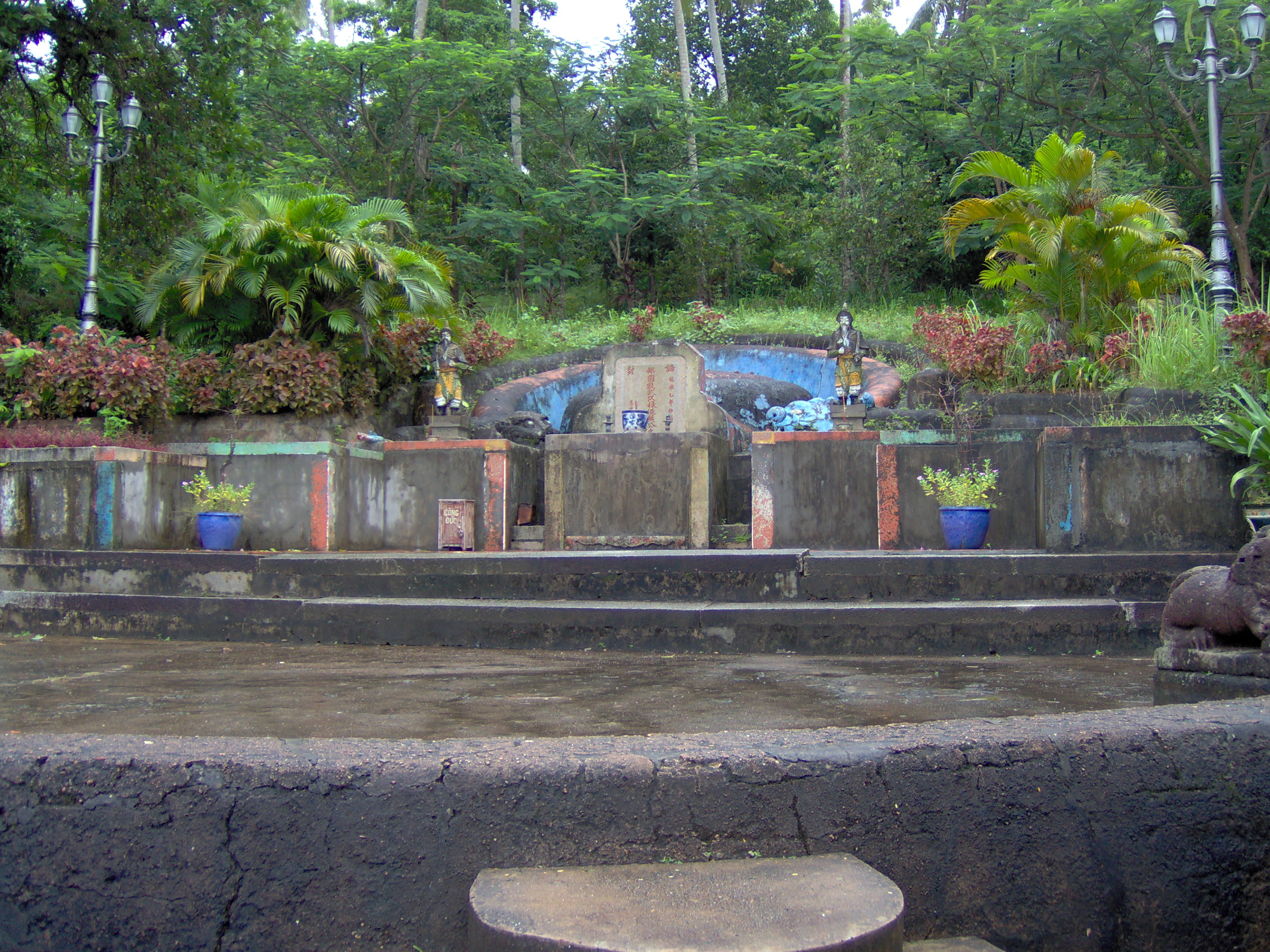
Tomb of Mạc Cửu in Hà Tiên, Vietnam.

A legend has been recorded which ascribes to tortoises the ability to find an auspicious place for a burial. According to the legend, some time during the Xiangfu era of Emperor Zhenzong, a man in Guangdong who was looking for a suitable (in feng shui terms) place to bury one of his parents on a certain mountain, learned that ten days prior several dozens of tortoises had brought a large dead tortoise to a certain spot and buried him there. The man found the tortoise's grave, reburied the reptile elsewhere, and used the spot to bury his own parent. Accordingly, he then had three sons born to him, two of whom earned the jinshi degrees, and all three were to occupy high positions in the Song establishment.

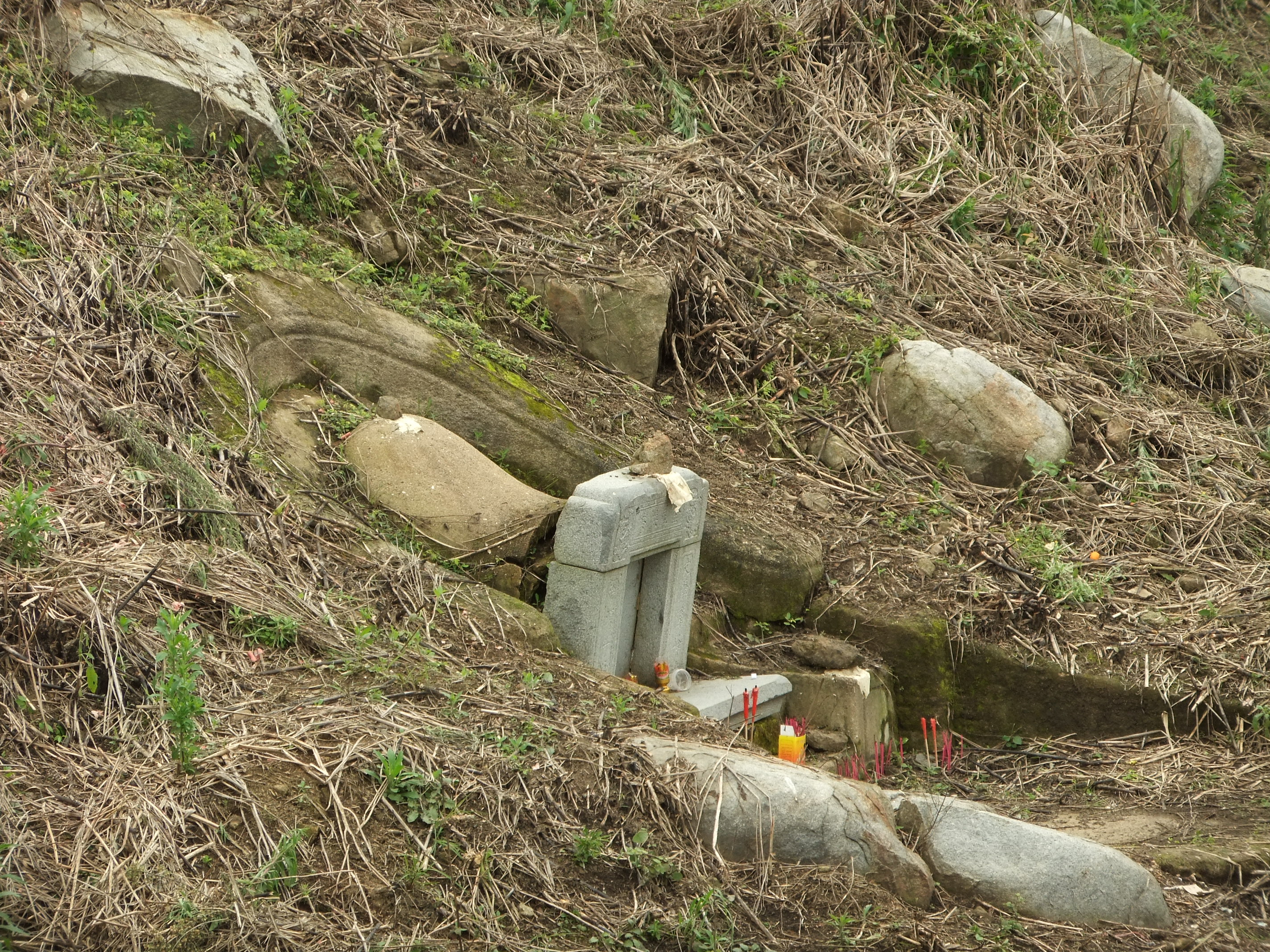
A not uncommon "half-turtle" hillside tomb style in the interior of Fujian (Gaotou Township, Yongding County), apparently related to the fully fledged turtleback tombs of the coastal Fujian

When considering the turtle motif in tomb constructions, some authors link it with the general symbolism of a turtle in the ancient Chinese culture, with its flat plastron below and its domed carapace above, representing the shape of the universe. Throughout China, for almost two millennia stone turtles, which became known as bixi, have been holding memorial stelae near graves of emperors and dignitaries; however, unlike Fujian's turtle-back shaped tombs, bixi are not placed directly above the grave. Unlike bixis, turtle-back graves don't have tablets standing on top of them.

When discussing the connection between the turtle/tortoise symbolism and burial practices, some authors even mention the custom of eating a variety of the traditional sweets, red tortoise cakes, at funeral feasts.

Turtle-back tombs in Lingshan Islamic Cemetery, Quanzhou
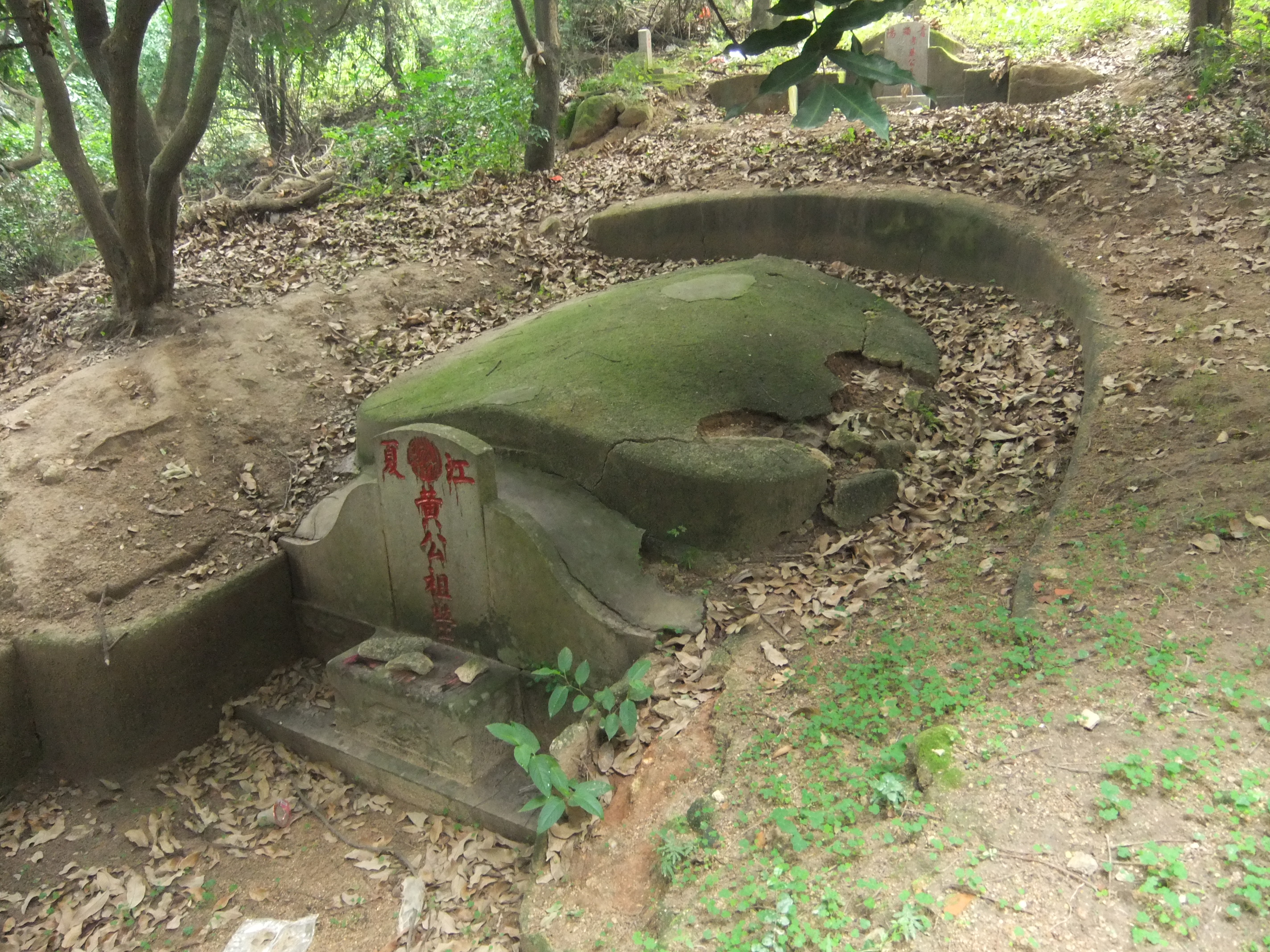

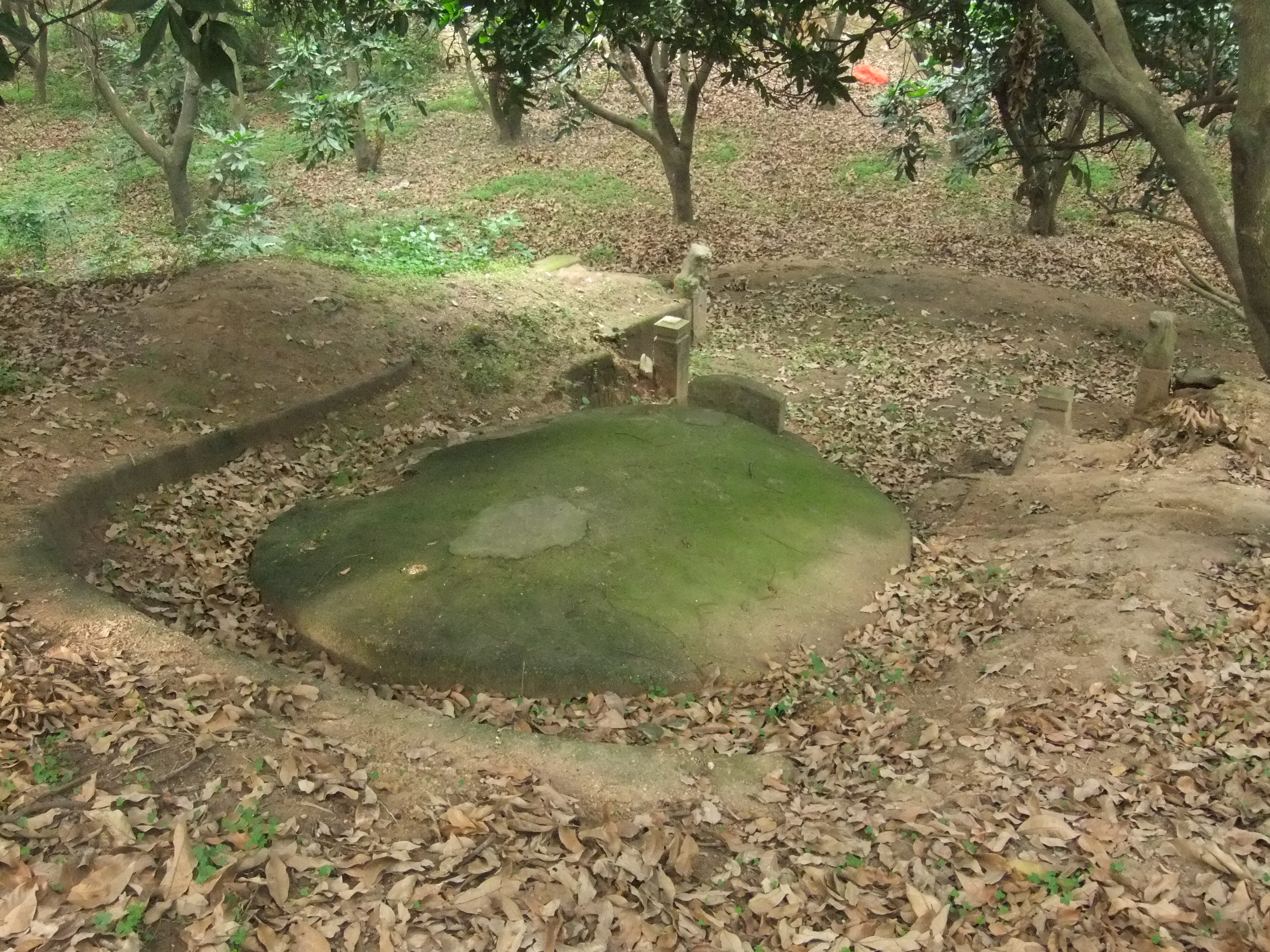

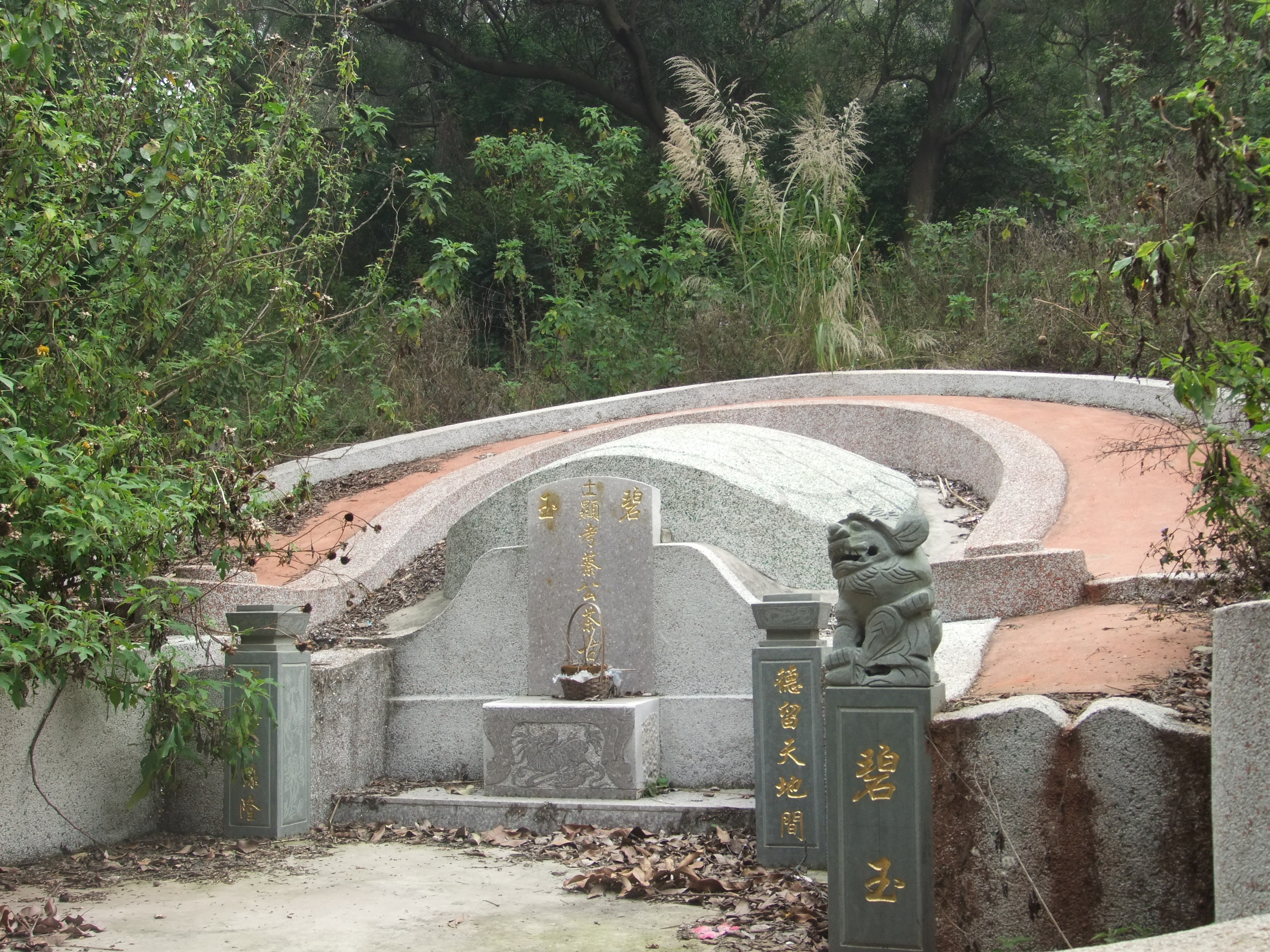

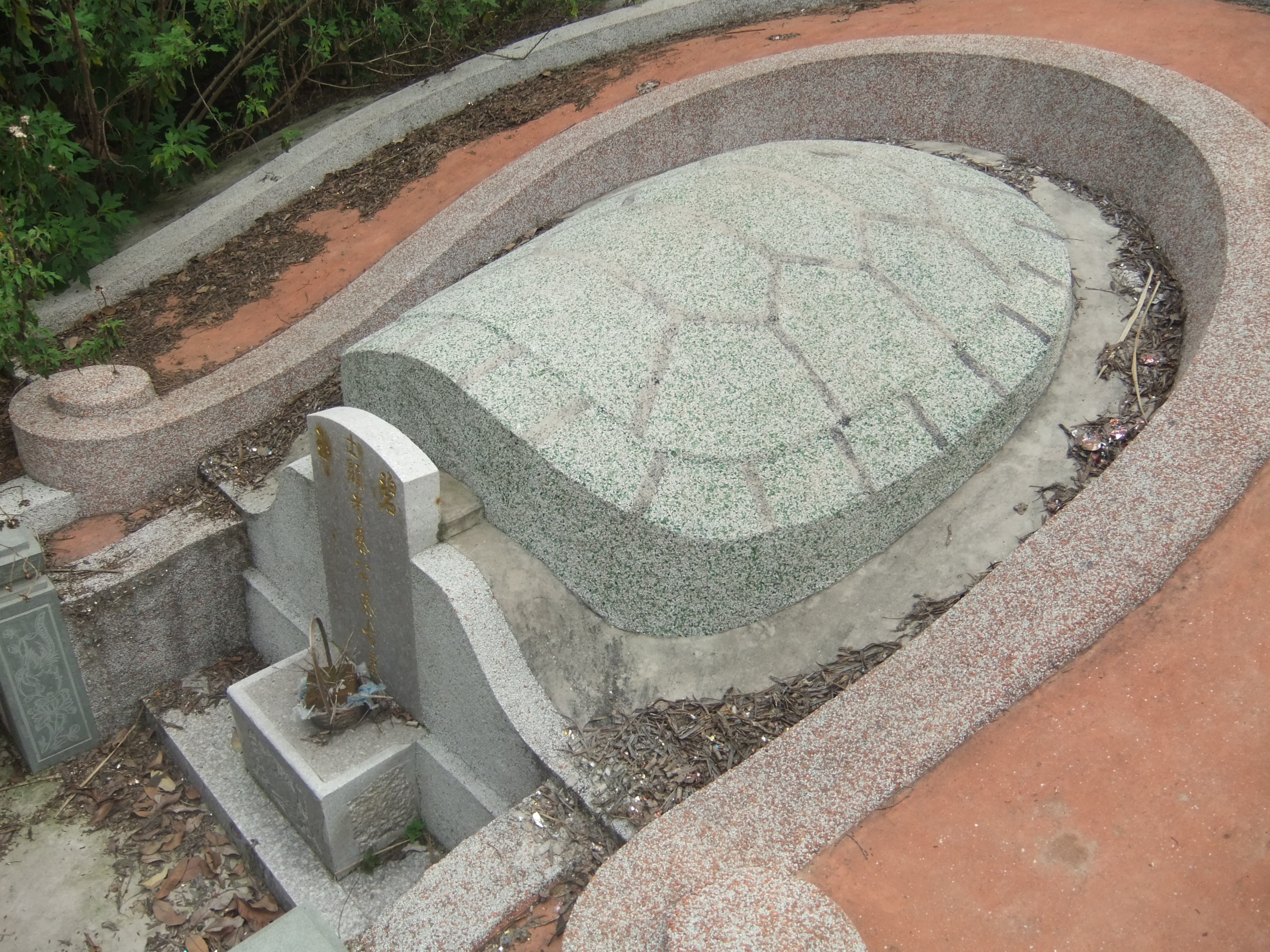

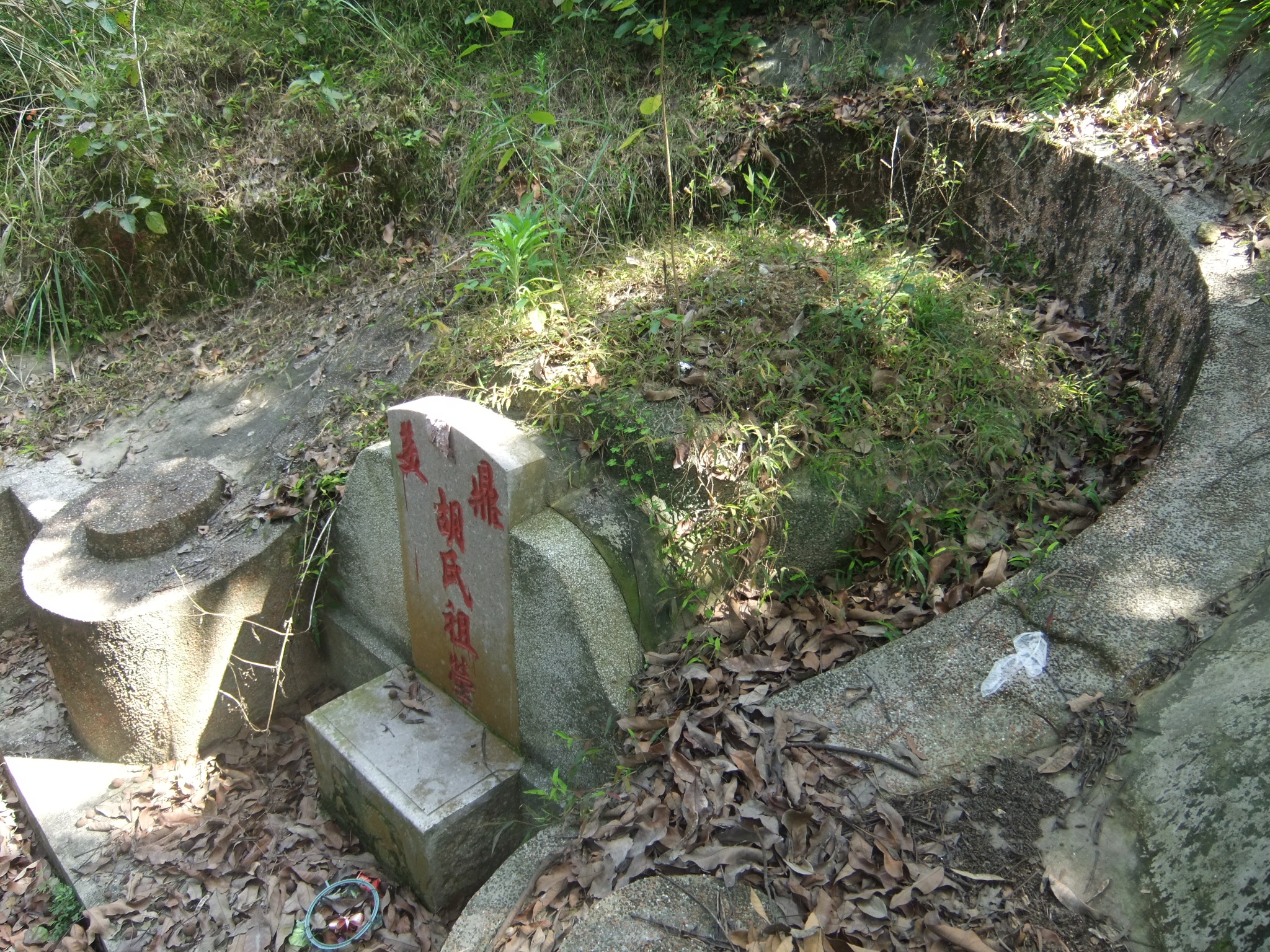

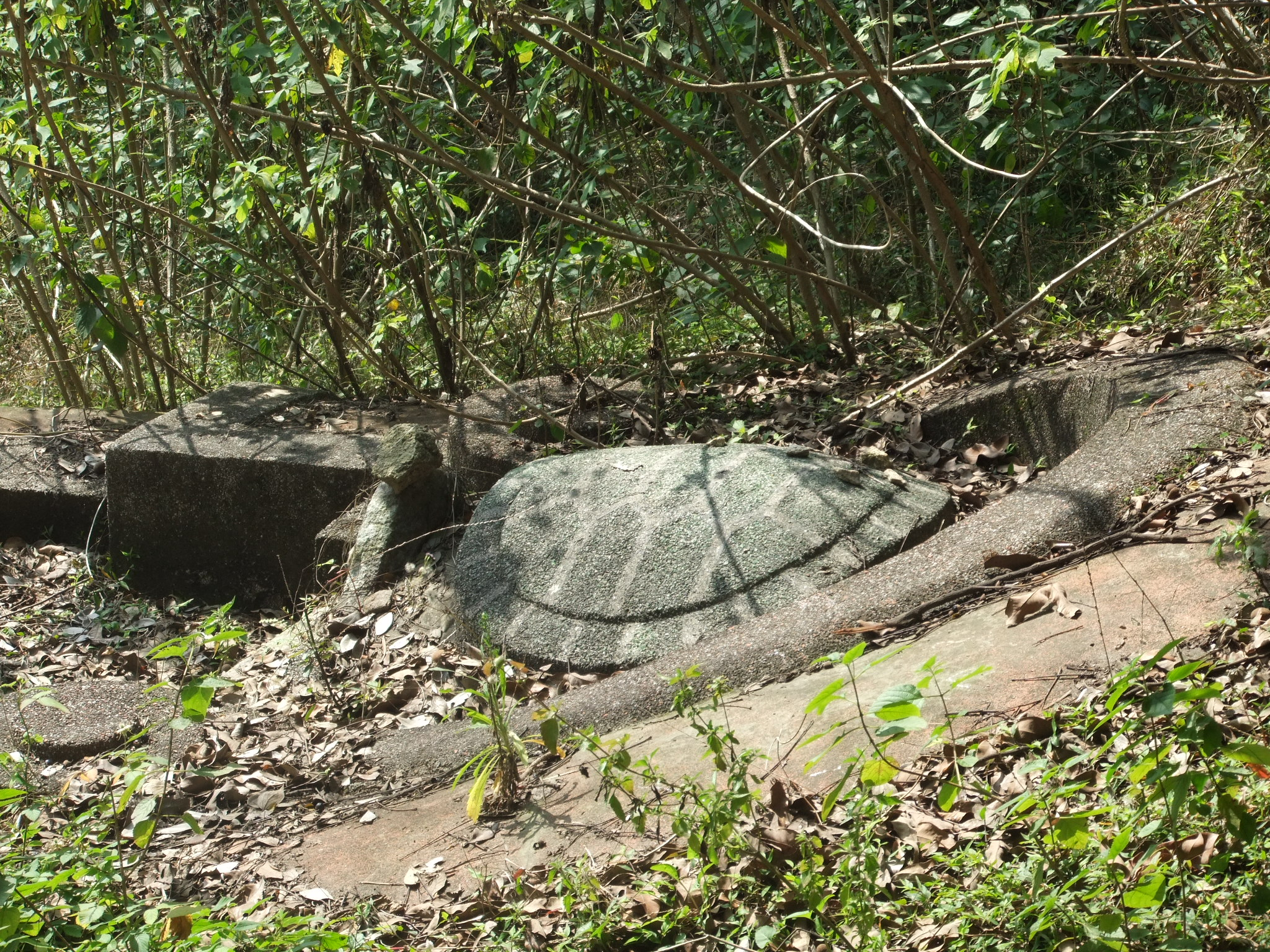

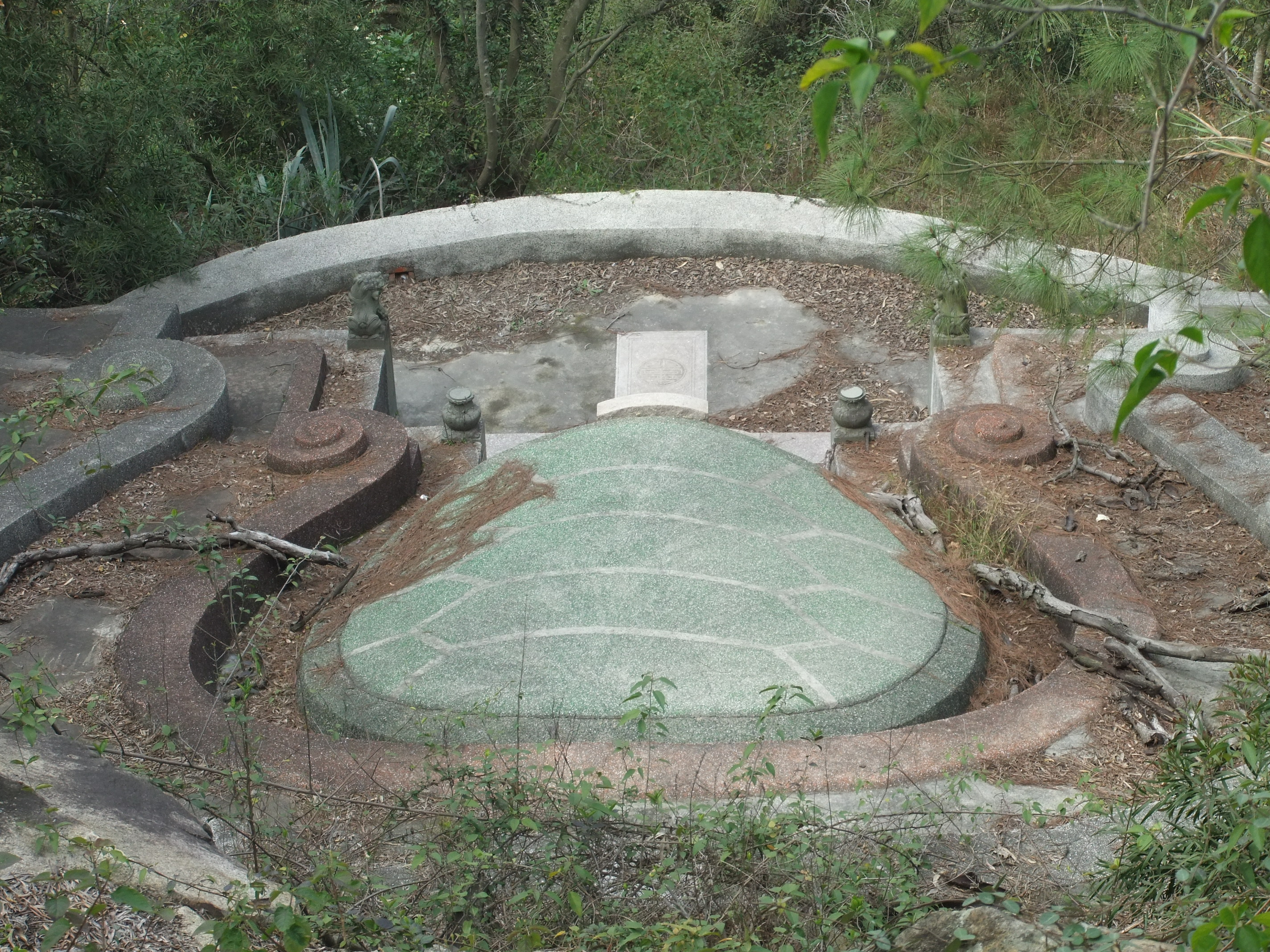

== In the Ryūkyū Islands ==
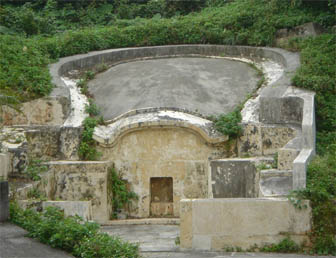
A turtleback tomb in Okinawa

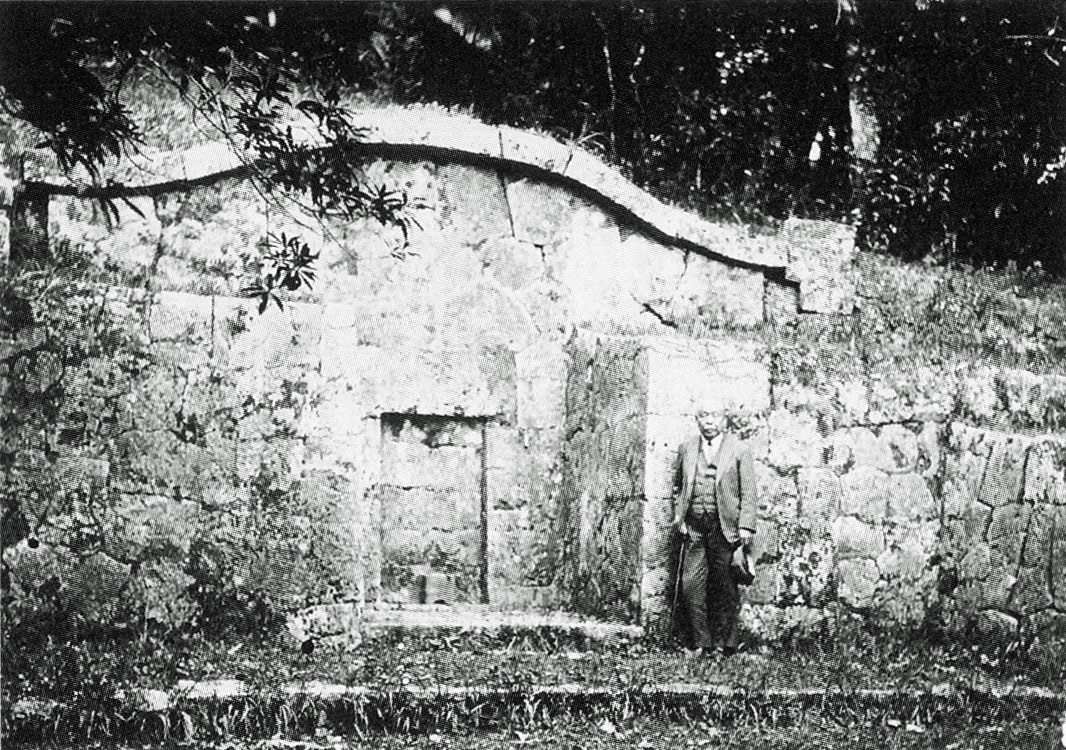
Tomb of Gosamaru

Turtleback tombs are thought to have been introduced into the Ryukyu Kingdom from Fujian in the late 17th or early 18th century ("in the interval between the careers of Shō Shōken and Sai On", according to Gregory Smits' monograph on the intellectual history of the Ryukyu Kingdom. Some authors give earlier dates; in particular, the tomb of Gosamaru (d. 1458) is often described as the first Ryūkyūan turtleback tomb. Okinawans believe that the shape of the tombs represent a woman's womb, so that the dead "return to the source". In the recent decades, several turtleback tombs in Okinawa Prefecture were designated cultural assets of cities, such as the Motobu Udun Tomb in Ganeko, Ginowan.

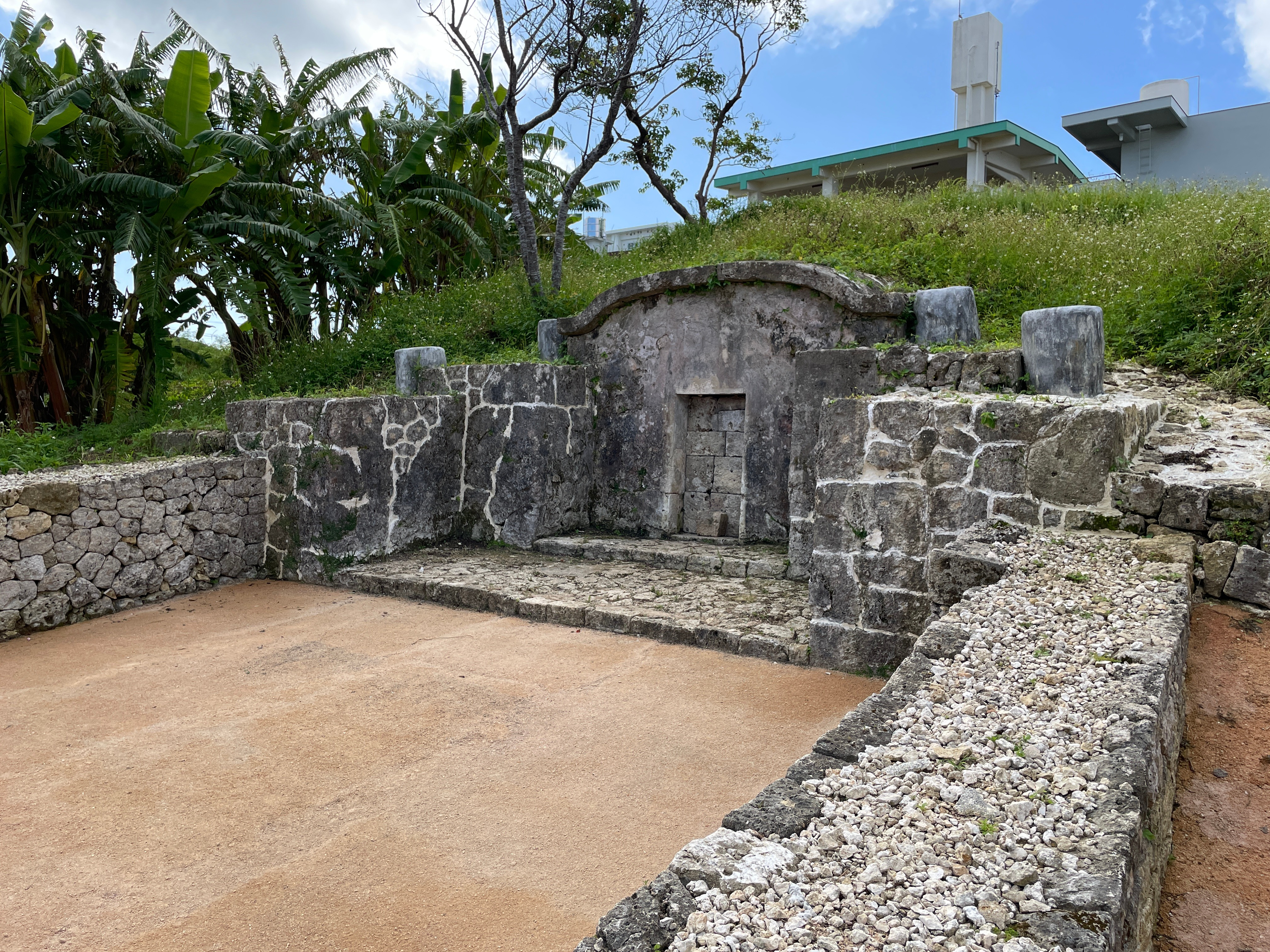
Motobu Udun Tomb Inner Yard

As of the mid-20th century, the turtleback tomb became the predominant tomb style in some parts of the Ryūkyū Islands. E.g., this was reported in Kabira Village (near Kabira Bay) in Ishigaki Island. Unlike single-person turtleback tombs of Fujian, the turtleback tombs of Ryūkyū were more of a burial vault, where bones of many generations of a particular family could repose. Typically, the coffin with the body of a deceased member of the family would stay in one part of such a tomb for some years (3, 5, 7, or 9). After the body would have decomposed, the bones would be washed by young female relatives of the deceased, placed into a large earthenware jar, and stored elsewhere in the tomb.

In a fictionalized description of a turtleback tomb in the eponymous short story, "Turtleback Tombs" or "亀甲墓", by Tatsuhiro Ōshiro (where much of the action happens inside such a tomb), the tomb's floor space is 150 square feet. Inside the tomb, urns with the bones of deceased ancestors stand on multiple rows of stone shelves, in the order of seniority. The doorway of the tomb is closed with a massive stone, serving as a door.

In the spring of 1945, during the Battle of Okinawa, many Okinawan civilians sought refuge from the naval bombardment of the island inside their ancestors' turtleback tombs, just like the characters of Ōshiro's short novel. Later, many of these tombs were also used by the Japanese defenders of the islands. The image became iconic enough for a local novelist, Tatsuhiro Ōshiro, to name a novel after these turtleback tombs. (Kame kōbaka, 1966).

Fighting for the turtleback tombs is mentioned in the accounts of American soldiers as well.

== Notable turtle-back tombs ==
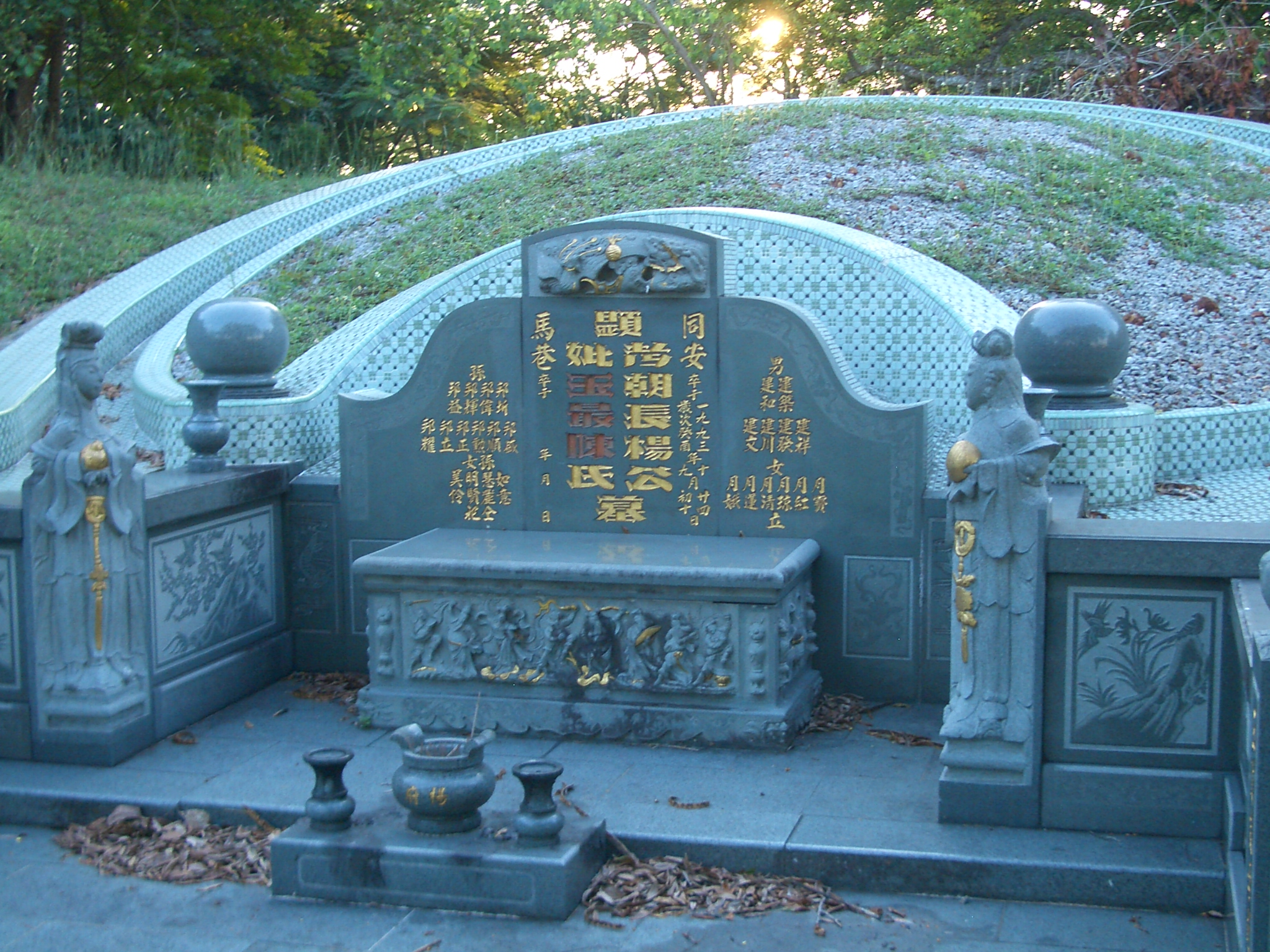
A tomb in Bukit Cina cemetery, Melaka, Malaysia. The deceased are of Xiamen-area origin

- The tomb of Tan Kah Kee in Jimei District, Xiamen.
- Gosamaru's tomb

== See also ==
- Feng shui
- Japanese funeral
- Kofun
