= Yoshimura Chōmei =

Aristocrat Yoshimura Aji Chomei

Yoshimura Aji Chōmei (義村 按司 朝明; 27 October 1830 – 9 January 1898), also known by the Chinese-style name Shō Shirei (向 志礼), was a Ryukyuan aristocrat. He was the third leader of Yoshimura Udun (義村御殿). His stepfather was Prince Yoshimura Chōshō (義村 朝章), the sixth son of King Shō Kō.

After Kamegawa Seibu died in 1880, Yoshimura became the chief leader of anti-Japanese factions. He was a Japanophobe and refused to let his daughter study in the Japanese school. During the First Sino-Japanese War, he led many Ryukyuan aristocrats into temples to pray for the victory of the Chinese. After the Chinese lost the war, he fled to Fuzhou, where he would die.

His second son Yoshimura Chōgi became a famous karate master.

Yoshimura Chōmei
Preceded by Yoshimura Chōshō	Head of Yoshimura Udun; 1847 － 1898	Succeeded by Yoshimura Chōgi
