= House of Motobu =

House of Motobu 本部御殿
- Udun
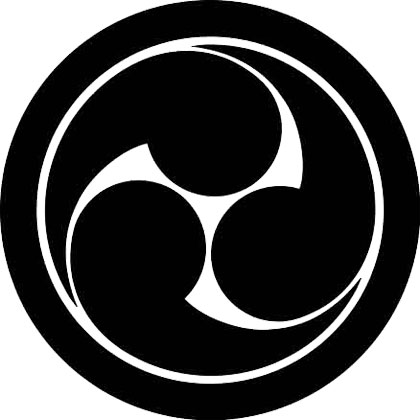
- Parent family: Second Shō Dynasty
- Country: Ryūkyū Kingdom
- Founded: 1666
- Founder: Shō Kōshin Motobu Wōji Chōhei (尚弘信 本部王子朝平)
- Current head: Chōsei Motobu (本部 朝正)
- Historic seat: Motobu magiri
- Titles: Prince (王子, Wōji); Lord (按司, Aji)
- Traditions: Martial arts, poetry danse
- Cadet branches: Matsushima Dunchi (Shō Clan) (向氏松嶋殿内); Aseri Dunchi (Shō Clan) (向氏安勢理殿内); Motonaga Ke (Shō Clan) (向氏本永家)

The House of Motobu (本部御殿, Motobu Udun; Okinawan : Mutubu Udun) is a princely house of the Ryūkyū Kingdom founded by Shō Kōshin Motobu Wōji Chōhei (尚弘信 本部王子朝平; lit. Shō Kōshin, Chōhei Prince of Motobu), (Note: The names of high rank people of the Ryūkyū Kingdom include a part used for the diplomatic relations with China (kara-nā (唐名; lit. Chinese name)) and a part used for the diplomatic relations with Japan (yamatu-nā (大和名; lit. Japanese name)). The kara-nā includes a clan name (here : Shō) and a given name (here : Kōshin), the yamatu-nā includes a fief name (real or symbolic, here : Motobu), a title (here : Wōji, prince) and a given name (here : Chōhei). People also have a personal name (童名, warabi-nā; lit. childhood name) only used in the family circle (here : Umimachigani)) sixth son of the tenth king of the second Shō dynasty, Shō Shitsu. It is a cadet branch of the Shō Clan.

Until annexion of the Ryūkyū Kingdom by Japan, the head of the House of Motobu had the function of lord administrator (按司地頭, aji jitū) of Motobu magiri (currently Motobu Town).

The fifth head of the house, Shō Kokuchin Motobu Aji Chōkyū (向国珍 本部按司朝救; lit. Shō Kokuchin, Chōkyū lord of Motobu), is a famous poet.

The eighth head of the house, Shō Keiho Motobu Aji Chōshō (尚景保 本部按司朝章; lit. Shō Keiho, Chōshō lord of Motobu) served as royal deputy (ambassador plenipotentiary) during the French-ryūkyūan convention negotiations (Convention entre la France et les Îles Liou-tchou) in 1855.

After the annexion of the kingdom by Japan, the tenth head of the house Chōyū Motobu and his younger brother Chōki Motobu developed the karate schools of Mutubu-udundī (本部御殿手) and Motobu kenpō (本部拳法).

== History ==
The house was founded by Shō Kōshin Chōhei Prince of Motobu.

Motobu magiri (initially named « Inoha magiri » (伊野波間切; Okinawan : Nufua magiri) was created in 1666 in order to be given as fief to Shō Kōshin, then aged 11.

The heads of the Motobu Udun house, since its creation and until the annexion of the kingdom by Japan, had the function of lord administrator (按司地頭, aji jitū) of Motobu magiri and often occupied important functions in the royal administration of Shuri, sometimes being granted the title of prince (王子, wōji), that is generally only given to the king's sons. It was a predominant family in the ryūkyūan political sphere, known for its implication in international relations, arts and martial arts.

== House heads and notorious members of the House of Motobu ==
Fourteen house heads have succeeded one another during eleven generations.

- 1st generation : Shō Kōshin Motobu Wōji Chōhei (尚弘信 本部王子朝平; lit. Shō Kōshin, Chōhei Prince of Motobu) (1655–1687)
- 2nd generation : Shō Ritai Motobu Aji Chōkan (向履泰 本部按司朝完; lit. Shō Ritai, Chōkan lord of Motobu)
- 3rd generation : Shō Bunshi Motobu Aji Chōchi (向文思 本部按司朝智; lit. Shō Bunshi, Chōchi lord of Motobu)
- 3rd generation : Shō Bunshi Motobu Wōji Chōryū (尚文思 本部王子朝隆; lit. Shō Bunshi, Chōryū Prince of Motobu) (was granted the title of prince) ( -1750)
- 4th generation : Shō Enhitsu Motobu Aji Chōkō (向延弼 本部按司朝恒; lit. Shō Enhitsu, Chōkō lord of Motobu) ( -1770)
- 5th generation : Shō Kokuchin Motobu Aji Chōkyū (向国珍 本部按司朝救; lit. Shō Kokuchin, Chōkyū lord of Motobu) (ja) (1741–1814)
- 6th generation : Shō Taiyū Motobu Wōji Chōei (尚大猷 本部王子朝英; lit. Shō Taiyū, Chōei Prince of Motobu) (was granted the title of prince)
- 7th generation : Inoha Aji Chōtoku (向氏 伊野波按司朝徳; lit. Chōtoku lord of Inoha of the Shō Clan)
- 8th generation : Shō Keiho Motobu Aji Chōshō (尚景保 本部按司朝章; lit. Shō Keiho, Chōshō lord of Motobu)
- 9th generation : Motobu Aji Chōshin (向氏 本部按司朝真; lit. Chōshin lord of Motobu of the Shō Clan)
- 10th generation : Chōyū Motobu (1857–1928)
- 11th generation : Seikichi Uehara (1904–2004)
- 11th generation : Chōmō Motobu (本部朝茂, Motobu Chōmō) (1890–1945)
- 11th generation : Chōsei Motobu (本部朝正, Motobu Chōsei) (born 1925)

=== Shō Kōshin, Chōhei Prince of Motobu ===
Chōhei (1655 – 1687), the founder of the lineage, was the sixth son of the tenth king of the second Shō dynasty, Shō Shitsu, and of the royal concubine Honkō of the Shō Clan, Agumushirārē of Adaniya (章氏本光 安谷屋阿護母志良礼, Shō shi Honkō Adaniya agumushirārē). (Note: The title of agumushirārē is often given to the royal concubines (妻))

According to the Chronicles of the Royal Generations (王代記, Ōdaiki), he was born on the 19th day of the 5th lunar month of year 12 of the Shunzhi era (23 June 1655) and died on the 27th day of the 8th month of year 26 of the Kangxi era (3 October 1687). His mother was the daughter of Shimabukuro pēchin Seiji (章氏島袋親雲上正次; lit. Seiji, pēchin of Shimabukuro, of the Shō Clan). The founding ancestor of the Shō (章) Clan is Wakamatsu Nakagusuku (中城若松, Nakagusuku Wakamatsu) (originally known as Wakamatsu Adaniya).

Chōhei took the name of prince of Motobu (本部王子, Motobu wōji) in 1666 when given Motobu magiri as his personal fief. He married the daughter of Adaniya uēkata Seibō (章氏安谷屋親方正房; lit. Seibō, uēkata of Adaniya, of the Shō Clan), the Princess of Urasaki (浦崎翁主, Urasaki ōshu). (Note: The title of ōshu is given to the king’s daughters and the spouses of the king’s sons)

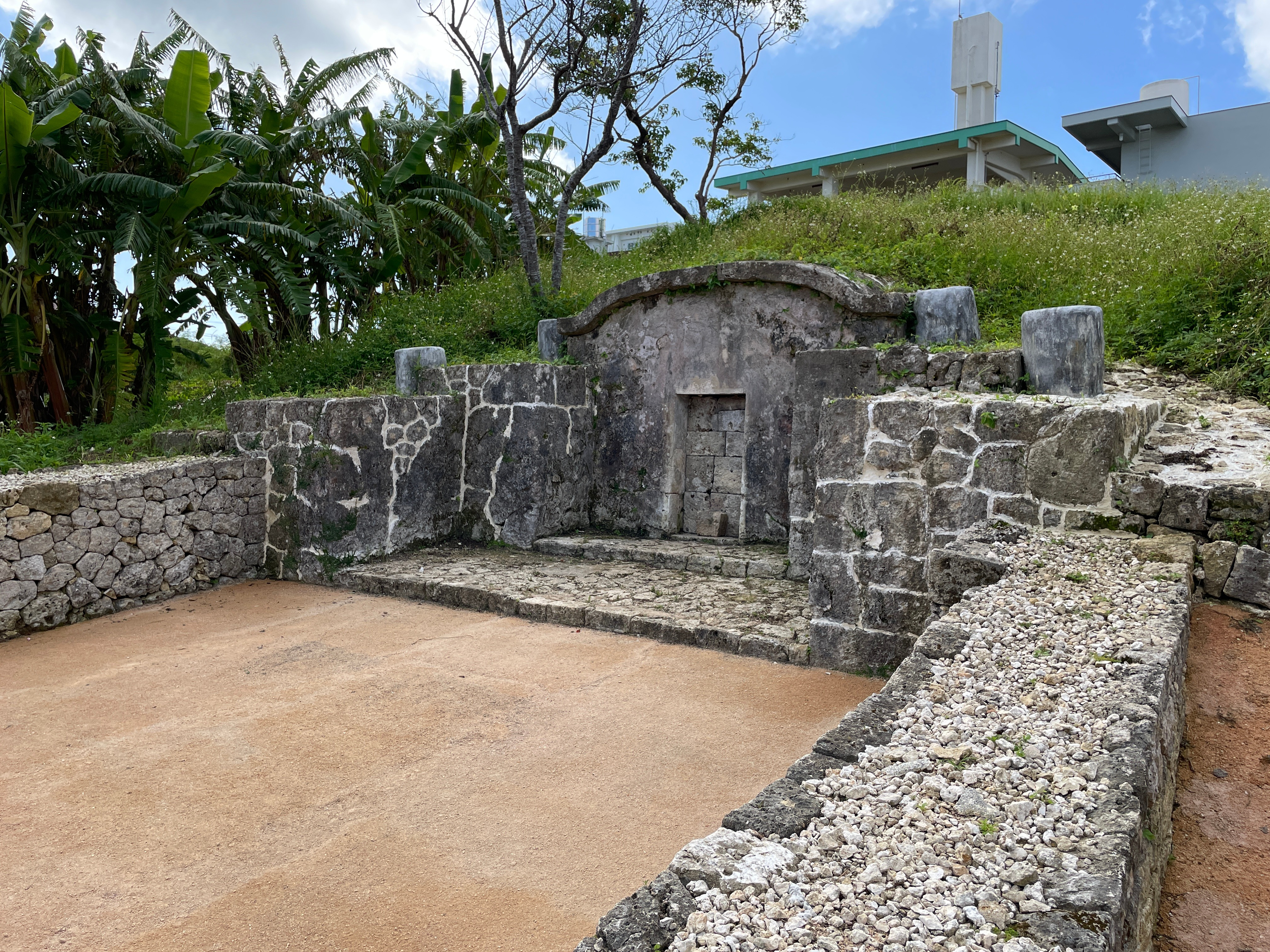
Motobu-udun-baka Tomb in Ganeko

He was buried in the Motobu-udun-baka tomb in Ganeko (Ginowan), that then became the family tomb of the House of Motobu.

His eldest son, Chōkan, succeeded him as the head of the House of Motobu, while his younger son, Chōtaku was adopted by Urasoe Aji and became the head of the House of Urasoe (浦添御殿, Urasoe Udun).

=== Shō Bunshi, Chōryū Prince of Motobu ===
Shō Bunshi Motobu Wōji Chōryū (尚文思 本部王子朝隆; lit. Shō Bunshi, Chōryū Prince of Motobu), the fourth head of the House of Motobu was appointed in 1716 as magistrate of the house of tea (御茶屋御殿奉行, uchaya udun bugyō), the ministry in charge of arts and tea ceremonies, in order to take care of the organisation of the ceremonies for the seventh anniversary of the death of king Shō Tei. For this event, he collaborated with the famous magistrate of dances (踊奉行, odori bugyō), Shō Juyū, Tamagusuku uēkata Chōkun (向受祐 玉城親方朝薫; lit. Shō Juyū, Chōkun uēkata of Tamagusuku). Chōkun's son, Chōki, who would also become magistrate of dances in 1756, had been Chōryū's tutor and had taught him the art of dance. This art would become predominant in the activities of the House of Motobu.

Chōryū also took part in embassies to Satsuma in 1723 and 1738.

He was one of the general supervisors during the redaction of the Kyūyō between 1743 and 1745.

His many activities at the service of the kingdom granted him the rank of prince, a title generally only given to the king's children.

=== Shō Kokuchin, Chōkyū Aji of Motobu ===
Shō Kukochin Motobu Aji Chōkyū (向国珍 本部按司朝救; lit. Shō Kokuchin, Chōkyū, lord of Motobu) (1741–1814), sixth head of the House of Motobu, is one of the masters of ryūkyūan poetry. He is, with I Seikō Sokei pēchin Chūgi (伊世高 惣慶親雲上忠義; lit. I Seikō, Chūgi pēchin of Sokei), one of the "two jewels of ryūkyūan poetry" (琉歌の双璧) and is also among the Thirty-six Immortal Poets of Okinawa.

His poetry is very pure and scholarly, essentially dealing with love feelings. He is depicted as a very formal man, always wearing his official attire and arriving several hours early to poetry meetings in order to read poetry books before the start of the gathering.

His skillful use of the particle dainsu (だいんす) in his poems granted him the nickname of "Dainsu Aji".

He is the author of the Song of the ama-kā spring (天川節, Amakā-bushi), that is used in the traditional play Ama-kā.

天川ぬ池ぬ 遊ぶ鴛鴦 ぬ 思羽ぬ契り よそや知らぬ
天川ぬ池や千尋ん立ちゅい うりゆいん深く思いたぼり

The promise of the loving wings of those mandarin ducks romping in the pool of the Ama-kā spring, outsiders cannot understand it
Is the pool of the Ama-kā spring one thousand firu deep ? You have to love me even deeper

As Chōryū, in addition to his artistic activities, Chōkyū took part in an embassy to Satsuma in 1773.

His wife, Mainugani, was the granddaughter of the 18th century karate master Gushikawa uēkata Umigami (具志川親方思亀; lit. Umigami, uēkata of Gushikawa).

=== Shō Taiyū, Chōei Prince of Motobu ===
Shō Taiyū Motobu Wōji Chōei (尚大猷 本部王子朝英; lit. Shō Taiyū, Chōei Prince of Motobu), seventh head of the House of Motobu, distinguished himself by his participation in embassies to Satsuma in 1804, 1809 and 1814, during which he partook of tasks related to the official relations with the Shimazu clan, made official visits to several temples and sanctuaries and attended poetry meetings.

His implication in the politics of the kingdom and the international relations with Japan granted him the rank of prince.

=== Shō Keiho, Chōshō Aji of Motobu ===
Convention between France and the Liou-tchou Islands

Shō Keiho Motobu Aji Chōshō (尚景保 本部按司朝章; lit. Shō Keiho, Chōshō lord of Motobu), ninth head of the House of Motobu, is celebrated as a martial arts master. He served three different kings, Shō Kō, Shō Iku and Shō Tai, for whom he was "teacher of martial arts" (武術指南役).

In 1855, he serves as royal deputy (ambassador plenipotentiary) during the French-ryūkyūan convention negotiations (Convention between France and the Liou-tchou Islands). It is said he was chosen to represent the king because his physical appearance and his poise gave him a royal aura.

He also took part in an embassy to Satsuma in 1859.

=== Chōyū Motobu ===
Chōyū Motobu (1857–1928), eleventh head of the House of Motobu, is famous as the creator of the karate branch that will later be known under the name of Mutubu-udundī (本部御殿手; lit. "hand (Note: "hand" stands for karate) of the House of Motobu").

He was also a master in the arts of dance and poetry. Before the fell of the Ryūkyū Kingdom, he used the title of Aji of Inoha (伊野波按司, Inoha Aji), which was the title used by the eldest sons of the heads of the House of Motobu before they succeeded to their fathers.

After the fall of the kingdom, the position of head of the House of Motobu merged with the position of head of the Mutubu-udundī school of karate. Chōyū transmitted the title to his karate disciple Seikichi Uehara, to whom he gave the mission to go and teach the Mutubu-udundī secrets to his son Chōmō who lived in Wakayama in Japan.

=== Chōki Motobu ===
Chōki Motobu (1870–1944), the younger brother of Chōyū, is a famous karate master, often presented as the greatest karate master in all Okinawan history, and known mondially. He moved to Ōsaka during the Taishō Period and started the diffusion of karate in Japan. He is the creator of the Motobu kenpō school.

=== Chōfu Kyan ===
Chōfu Kyan (1839–1910), who was called before the fall of the kingdom Shō Ishin Kyan uēkata Chōfu (向維新 喜屋武親方朝扶; lit. Shō Ishin, Chōfu uēkata of Kyan), was from a cadet branch of the House of Motobu, the Motonaga family (向氏本永家, Shō-shi Motonaga-ke; lit. Motonaga family of the Shō Clan)). He became through marriage the head of the Kyan family (向氏喜屋武家, Shō-shi Kyan-ke; Kyan family of the Shō Clan). He was a famous karate master who studied with Sōkon Matsumura.

=== Chōtoku Kyan ===
Chōtoku Kyan (1870–1945) was the third son of Chōfu Kyan. Although he became by adoption the head of the Motonaga family, he is mainly known under his former name of Kyan. He also was a famous karate master, having studied with his father, Sōkon Matsumura and Kōsaku Matsumora.

=== Chōsei Motobu ===
Chōsei Motobu (born in 1925) is the current head of the House of Motobu. He is Chōki Motobu's son, born in Ōsaka. He is a master of the Motobu kenpō karate school that was developed by his father. He also learnt the Mutubu-udundī with Seikichi Uehara starting in 1976 and inherited the title of master of the Mutubu-udundī.

== Coat of arms ==
The coat of arms of the House of Motobu is a hijaigumun (左御紋; Japanese : hidari gomon) inscribed into a circle. The hijaigumun is the symbol of the royal family of the Ryūkyū Kingdom, and can only be doned by families descending from the royal family. It is very often used by the houses of the udun rank for their coat of arms, associated with other elements (here a circle).
