= Udun (Ryūkyū) =

Princely houses of the Ryukyu Kingdom

Udun (御殿) is the name given to the princely houses of the Ryūkyū Kingdom, generally issued from a son of one of the kings of Ryūkyū who did not inherit the throne. The term also refers to the residences of those families, as well as to the royal residences and, by extension and often written with a different ideogram (陵), the royal mausolea.

== Princely residences ==
Originally, udun refers to the residences of the members of the ryūkyūan nobility with the rank of wōji (王子; lit. "prince") or aji (按司; lit. "lord"). Those titles are generally reserved for the kings' sons (wōji) and their descendants (aji).

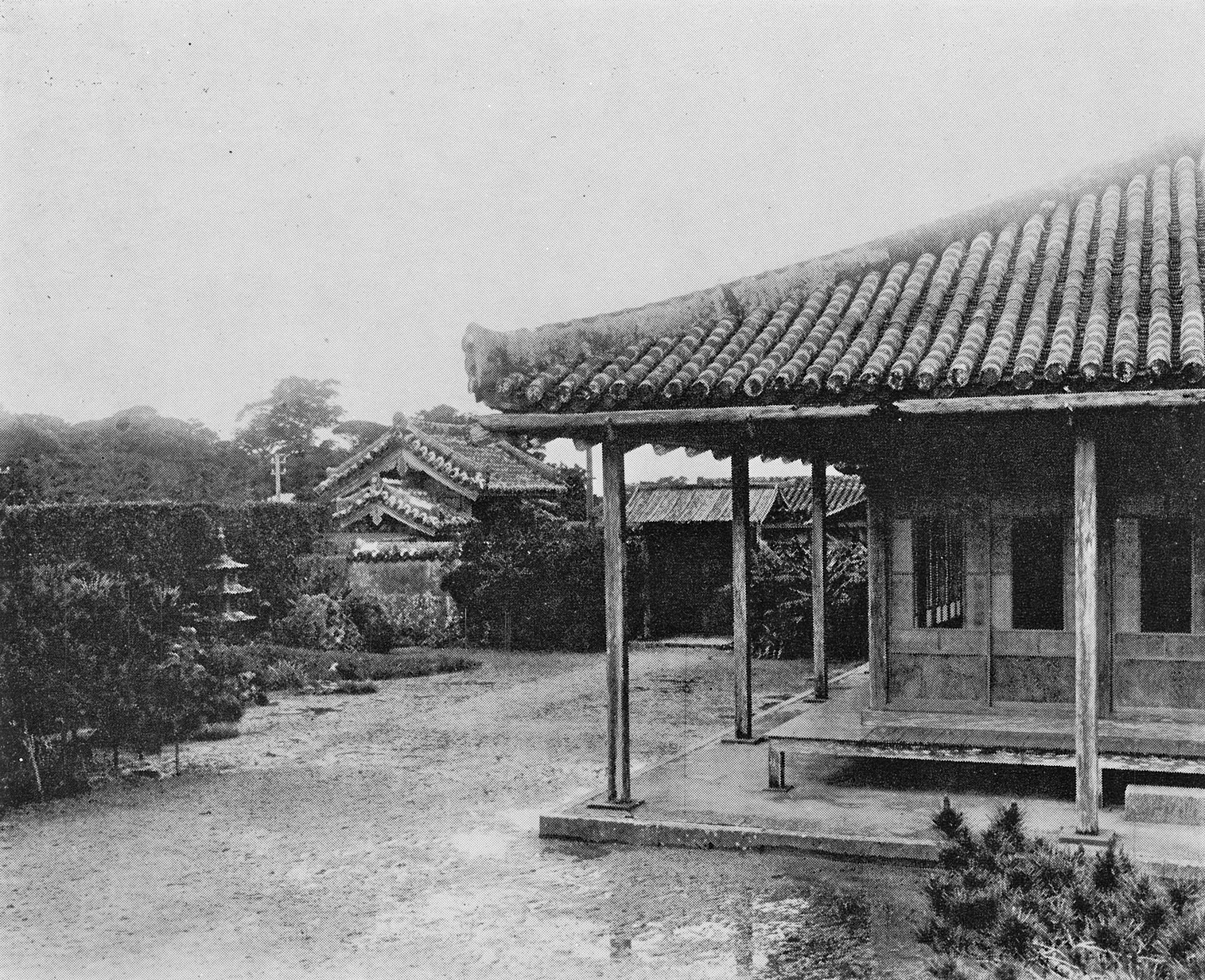
Nakagusuku Udun around 1920

The residences take the name of the fief that was given to the prince or lord: the residence of the crown prince, the prince of Nakagusuku, is "Nakagusuku Udun" (中城御殿), the residence of the prince of Motobu is "Motobu Udun", the one of the prince of Nakijin is "Nakijin Udun".

When the fief attributed to the head of the house changes, the name of the residence changes as well: the house descending from Shō Ikō Urasoe wōji Chōman (尚維衡 浦添王子朝満; Shō Ikō, Chōman prince of Urasoe) administered consecutively the magiris of Urasoe, Gushichan, Ginowan and Oroku, their residence being successively known under the names of "Urasoe Udun", "Gushichan Udun", "Ginowan Udun" and "Oroku Udun".

Most of the residences of the udun rank were located north of Shuri Castle, essentially in Tōnokura (当蔵村; Okinawan : Tūnukura), Ōnaka (大中村; Okinawan : Ufuchun) and Akahira (赤平村). The laws concerning the construction of residences mention that the residences of the udun type can be built on a land up to 1,000 tsubo (3,300 square metres) large, that the enclosure can count up to three gates (a large gate, a medium gate and a small gate) and that the building itself can be up to 200 tsubo (660 square metres) large.

== Other residences and buildings ==
The rank of udun can also be given to residences and buildings not directly related to people of the wōji or aji rank:

- Sashichi Udun (佐敷御殿; modern pronunciation: Sashiki Udun): building where the official activities of the queen were managed
- Ufumi Udun (大美御殿; modern pronunciation: Ōmi Udun): secondary residence of the king
- Sachiyama Udun (崎山御殿; modern pronunciation: Sakiyama Udun): secondary residence of the king, tea pavilion inside Uchaya Udun (御茶屋御殿), the "eastern gardens" (東苑)

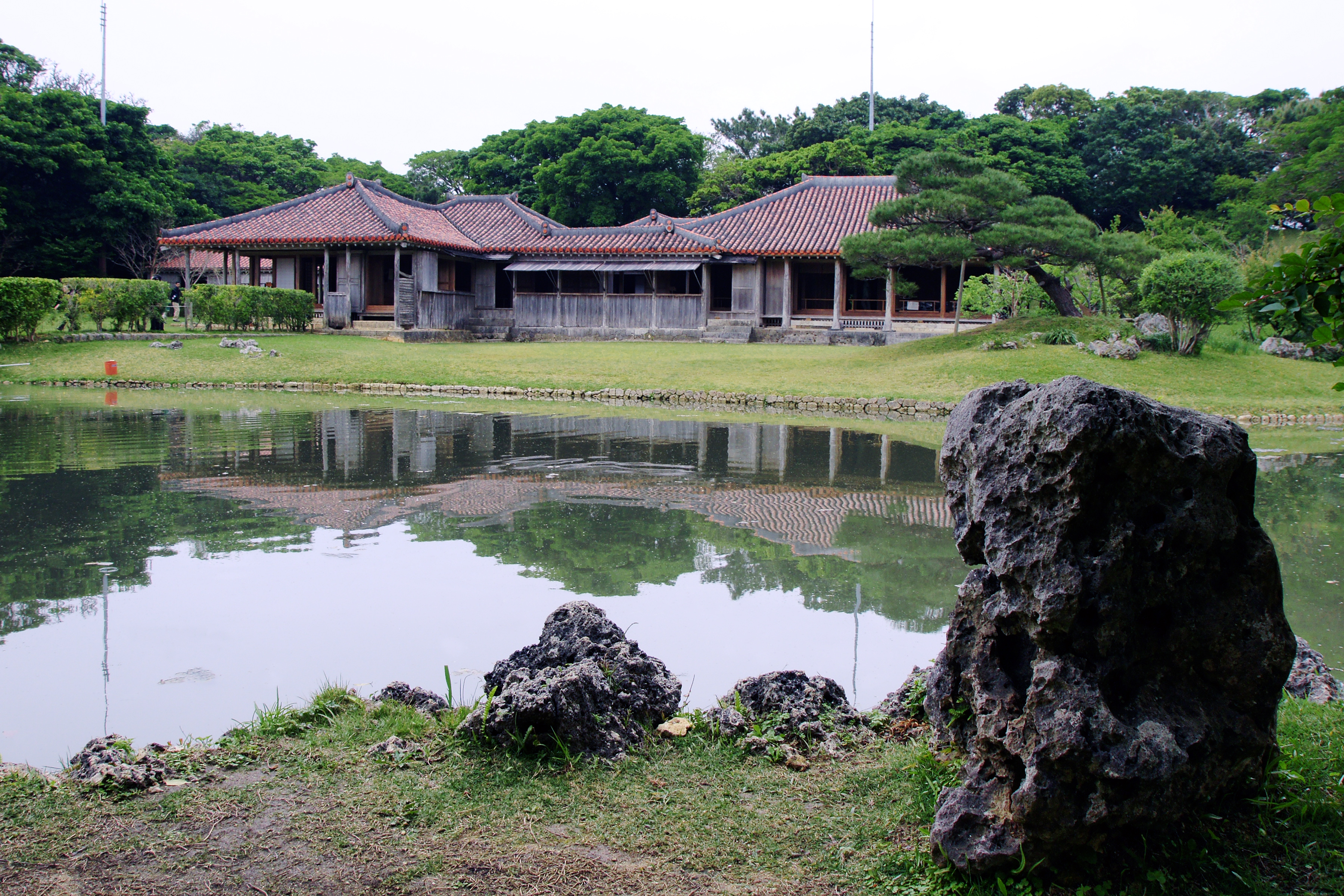
Shikina Udun

- Shichina Udun (識名御殿; modern pronunciation: Shikina Udun): secondary residence of the king, also known under the name of "Shikina gardens" (識名園, shikina-en) or "southern gardens" (南苑)
- Chifijin Udun (聞得大君御殿): (Note: the modern pronunciation, that would be « Kikoe-ōgimi Udun », is never used for this building) residence of Kikoe-ōgimi
- Uchima Udun (内間御殿): sacred site built at the location of Kanamaru's former residence.

== Honorific title ==
By metonymy, the term of udun is used as honorific to address people of the wōji or aji rank and their spouses. The term of Udun is then substituted to their personal titles after the name of their fief : for instance, for the prince of Ginowan, the official title of "Ginowan Aji-ganashi" is replaced by "Ginowan Udun", for the queen, the official title of "Sashiki Aji-ganashi" is replaced by "Sashiki Udun", for the princess of Urasaki, the official title of "Urasaki Ōshu" is replaced by "Urasaki Udun".

== Princely houses ==
By extension, the term of udun is used to qualify the princely houses whose head's rank is wōji or aji, generally descending from a son of one of the kings of Ryūkyū who did not inherit the throne: the house of Motobu, founded by the prince of Motobu, is named "Motobu Udun".

The only house with the rank of udun that is not descended from the kings of Ryūkyū is the house of Kunigami.

The house of Makabi is a particular instance, since the lineage has been founded by king Shō Tei's queen, Makabi Aji-ganashi, who adopted one of Shō Tei's grandsons in order to create her own house.

The house of Takamine was founded by the granddaughter of king Shō Hō, the princess of Urasoe (浦添翁主, Urasoe ōshu), daughter of Shō Kyō, crown prince who died before he inherited the throne.

Cadet branches of udun houses are generally houses with the rank of dunchi (殿内). The house of Haneji, although it is a cadet branch of the house of Oroku, kept the rank of udun. The house of Kyan was demoted to the rank of dunchi after the direct lineage was broken.

When the kingdom fell, there were thirty houses with the rank of udun, presented below in the chronological order of their foundation.

- House of Oroku (小禄御殿, Oroku Udun; traditionally Uruku Udun) (Note: most of those houses still exist so that the modern pronunciation is the most used one) (15th century)
- House of Gushikawa (具志川御殿, Gushikawa Udun; traditionally Gushichā Udun) (15th century)
- House of Tamagusuku (玉城御殿, Tamagusuku Udun; traditionally Tamagushiku Udun) (16th century)

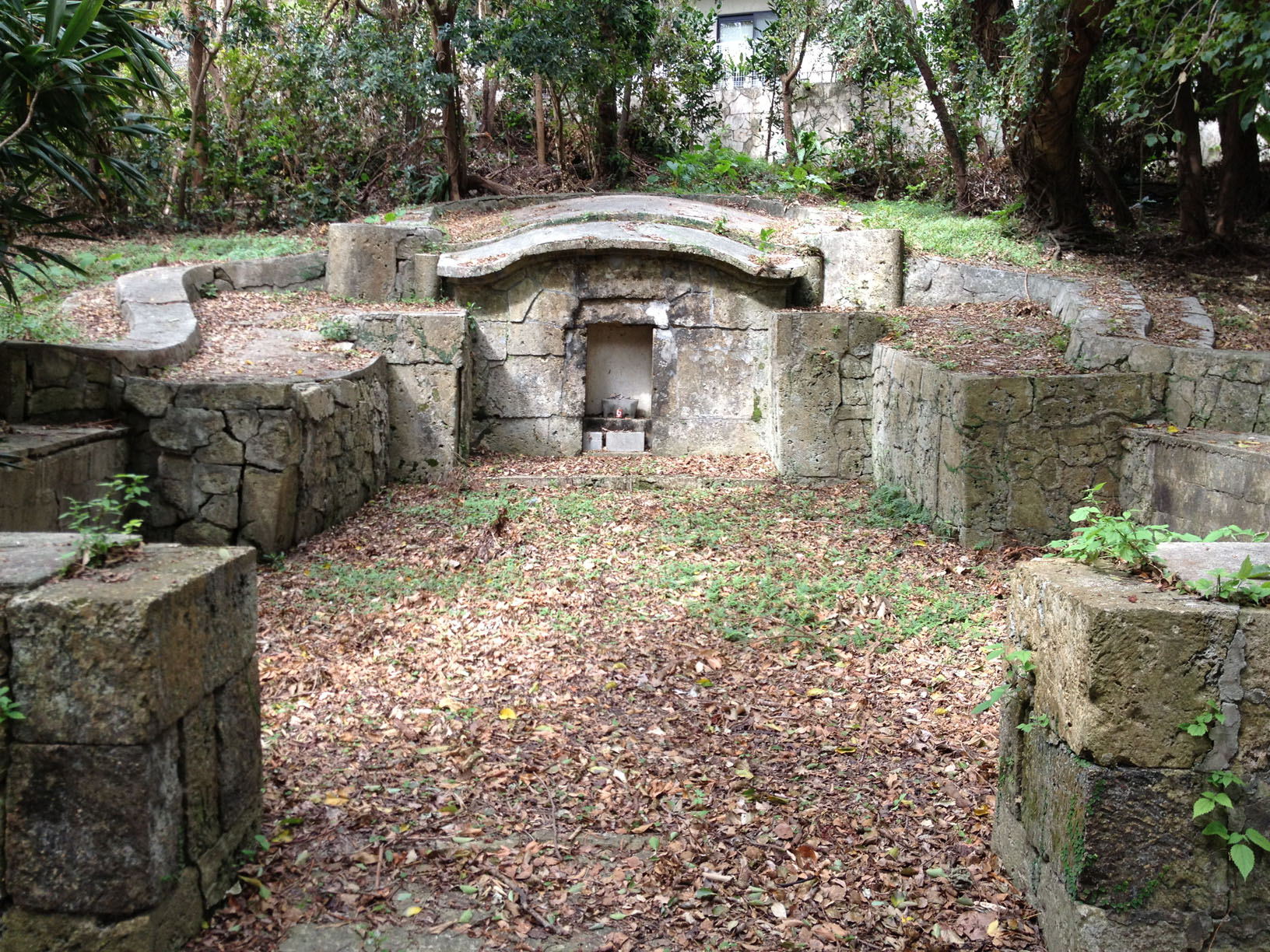
Tomb of the House of Ie, « Ie-udun-baka »

- House of Ie (伊江御殿, Ie Udun; traditionally Iīe Udun) (16th century)
- House of Tamagawa (玉川御殿, Tamagawa Udun; traditionally Tamagā Udun) (16th century)
- House of Haneji (羽地御殿, Haneji Udun; traditionally Haniji Udun) (16th century)
- House of Goeku (護得久御殿, Goeku Udun; traditionally Guīku Udun) (16th century)
- House of Kin (金武御殿, Kin Udun; traditionally Chin Udun) (16th century)
- House of Kunigami ( 国頭御殿, Kunigami Udun; traditionally Kunjan Udun) (égranted the rank of udun in 1571)
- House of Takamine (高嶺御殿, Takamine Udun; traditionally Takanmi Udun) (17th century)
- House of Mabuni (摩文仁御殿, Mabuni Udun; traditionally Mabunī Udun) (17th century)
- House of Ufumura (大村御殿, Ufumura Udun; modern pronunciation Ōmura Udun) (17th century)
- House of Nago (名護御殿, Nago Udun; traditionally Nagu Udun) (17th century)
- House of Katsuren (勝連御殿, Katsuren Udun; traditionally Katchin Udun) (17th century)
- House of Motobu (本部御殿, Motobu Udun; traditionally Mutubu Udun) (17th century)
- House of Yonagusuku (与那城御殿, Yonagusuku Udun; traditionally Yunagushiku Udun) (17th century)
- House of Tomigusuku (豊見城御殿, Tomigusuku Udun; traditionally Timigushiku Udun) (17th century)
- House of Gushichan (具志頭御殿, Gushichan Udun) (17th century)
- House of Ōgimi (大宜見御殿, Ōgimi Udun; traditionally Ujimi Udun) (17th century)
- House of Nakazato (仲里御殿, Nakazato Udun; traditionally Nakazatu Udun) (17th century)
- House of Makabi (真壁御殿, Makabi Udun; traditionally Makan Udun) (17th century)
- House of Kushi ( 久志御殿, Kushi Udun) (18th century)
- House of Yuntanza (読谷山御殿, Yuntanza Udun; traditionally Yuntanja Udun) (18th century)
- House of Urasoe (浦添御殿, Urasoe Udun; traditionally Urashī Udun) (18th century)
- House of Yoshimura (義村御殿, Yoshimura Udun) (18th century)
- House of Misato (美里御殿, Misato Udun; traditionally Njatu Udun) (18th century)

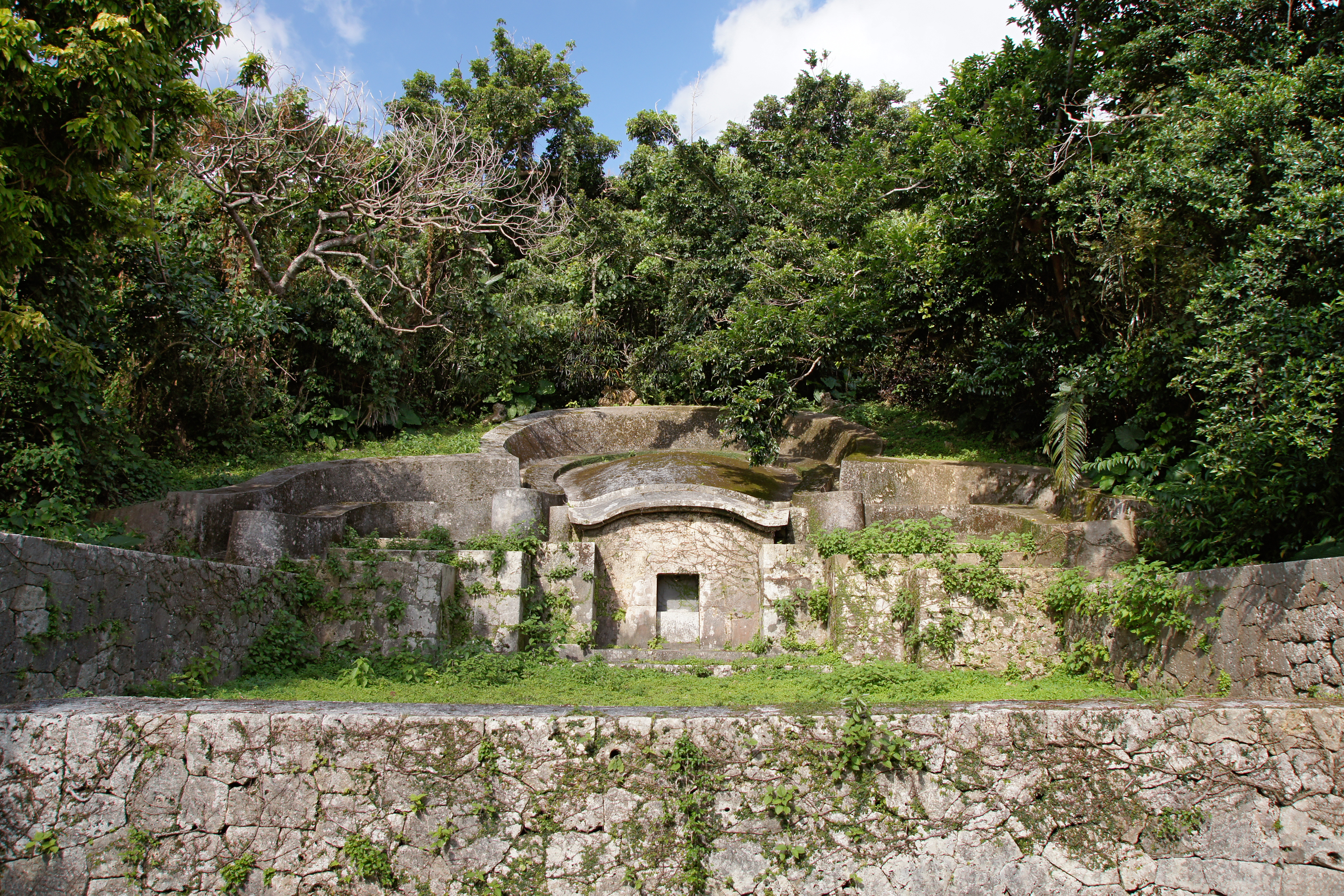
Tombe de la Maison de Ginowan (initialement tombe de la Maison de Gushichan)

- House of Ōzato (大里御殿, Ōzato Udun) (19th century)
- House of Nakijin (今帰仁御殿, Nakijin Udun; traditionally Nachijin Udun) (19th century)
- House of Ginowan (宜野湾御殿, Ginowan Udun; traditionally Jinōn Udun) (19th century)
- House of Matsuyama (松山御殿, Matsuyama Udun; traditionally Machiyama Udun) (19th century)
