= Motobu-ryū =

School of karate in Japan

Motobu-ryū (本部流)
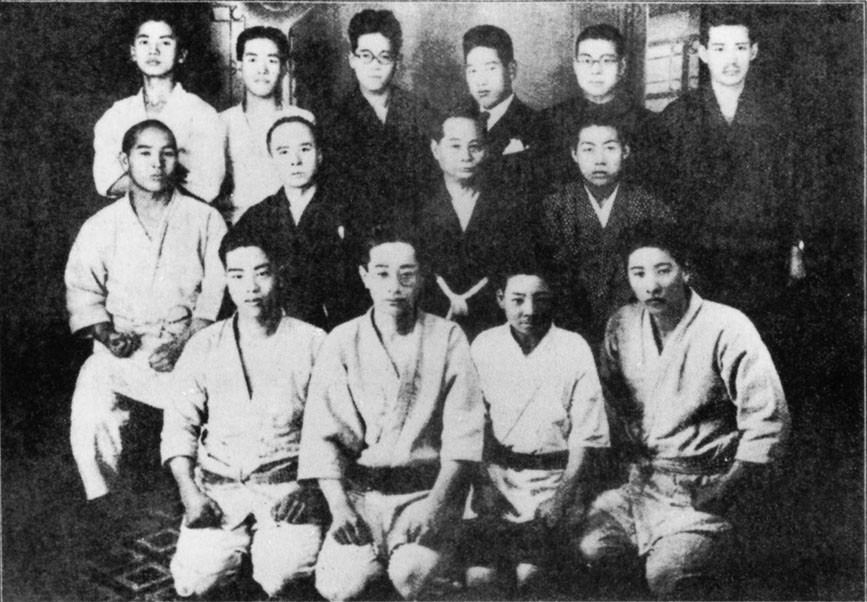
- Motobu-ryū in 1926.
- Date founded: 1922
- Country of origin: Japan
- Founder: Motobu Chōki (1870–1944)
- Current head: Motobu Chōsei
- Arts taught: Karate, Kobudō
- Ancestor schools: Shuri-te• Tomari-te
- Descendant schools: Wadō-ryū• Shindō jinen-ryū• Matsubayashi Ryu • Nihon Kenpo Karatedo • Tōon-ryū
- Official website: Motobu-ryu

Motobu-ryū (本部流) is a karate school founded in 1922 by Motobu Chōki from Okinawa. Its official name is Nihon Denryū Heihō Motobu Kenpō ("Japan Traditional Fighting Tactics Motobu Kenpō"), or Motobu Kenpō for short. Motobu-ryū has the characteristics of koryū (old style) karate, the martial art known as tī or tōdī, which predates the birth of modern karate, and emphasizes kumite rather than kata.

Motobu Udundī (本部御殿手), also sometimes called Motobu-ryū, is the martial art of the Motobu family, a branch of the Ryukyuan royal family. The Motobu family, called the Motobu Udun (literally Motobu Palace), was one of the most prominent families in Okinawa and had the right of succession to the throne. Motobu Udundī is a comprehensive martial art that includes not only karate, but also a jujutsu-like technique called tuitī and many weapons arts.

Motobu Chōsei is the inheritor of both Motobu-ryū (his father's art) and Motobu Udundī (the art of his uncle, Motobu Chōyū).

== Motobu Kenpō ==
=== History ===
Motobu Chōki's father, Prince Motobu Chōshin (Motobu Aji Chōsin) was a descendant of Shō Kōshin, aka Prince Motobu Chōhei (1655 - 1687), the sixth son of Shō Shitsu (1629–1668), the King of Ryukyu. Chōki was the third son of the Motobu Udun ("Motobu Palace"), one of the cadet branches of the Ryūkyūan royal family.

As the last of three sons, Motobu Chōki was not entitled to an education in his family's style of tī (an earlier name for karate). Instead, he and his brother, Chōyū, invited Ankō Itosu to the Motobu Udun as a karate teacher and began formal karate lessons. However, being five years younger than Chōyū, he always lost to his brother in kumite. Therefore, in addition to Itosu, he also trained under legendary masters such as Matsumura Sōkon, Sakuma, and Kōsaku Matsumora.

From the age of 19 or 20 (c. 1890), Motobu, along with his older brother Chōyū and his friend Kentsū Yabu, began studying under Kōsaku Matsumora. He was taught by Matsumora, especially irikumi, an ancient form of kumite, and Matsumora praised him as being very talented in the martial arts. Yabu was a good friend of Motobu's and they practiced karate together throughout their lives. He is reported to have been very agile, which gained him the nickname Motobu no Saru, or "Motobu the Monkey."

Motobu emphasized kumite and criticized karate practitioners who practiced only kata, so he was slandered by them as a self-taught street fighter. In reality, however, he had learned koryū kumite from the great karate teachers mentioned above. Some of his karate teachers found his habit of testing his fighting prowess via street fights in the Tsuji (red-light district) undesirable, but his noble birth (as a descendant of the royal Okinawan Shō family) may have made it hard for them to refuse.

Around 1921, Motobu moved to Osaka, and in November 1922, he participated in a judo versus boxing match in Kyoto, knocking out a foreign boxer. He was 52 years old at the time. This unexpected victory enhanced his fame. Among other things, a feature article on the match in King, a popular magazine with a circulation of one million at the time, made Motobu's name and the Okinawan martial art of karate widely known to much of the Japanese public. Until then, karate was an unknown martial art in Japan.

The King article detailed Motobu's surprising victory, although the illustrations clearly show Funakoshi Gichin as the Okinawan fighter in question. The two were often at odds in their opinions about how karate ought to be taught and used.

In 1923 Motobu opened a dojo in Osaka. Around 1927, Motobu moved to Tokyo to establish the Daidōkan dojo and also became the first Shihan of the karate club at Toyo University. In 1936, Motobu temporarily closed his Daidokan dojo and returned to Okinawa, where he attended the karate masters' roundtable discussion held in Naha in October. The following year, he returned to mainland Japan and resumed teaching karate. 1942, he taught karate at Tottori Agricultural High School. He then returned to Okinawa, where he died in 1944.

Motobu Chōki was succeeded by his son Chōsei, who opened a dojo in Osaka in 1948 and began teaching karate. In 1977, he formed the Nihon Karatedō Motobu-kai (Japan Karatedō Motobu Association) with some of his father's students.

=== Kata ===
Motobu Chōki learned naihanchi and channan (prototype of pinan) from Itosu. He also learned koryū naihanchi from Sakuma and Matsumura, but reported various differences between koryu naihanchi and Itosu's modified Naihanchi. Motobu distanced himself from Itosu's modified version, saying he follows the teachings of Sakuma and Matsumura.

Motobu also taught shirokuma, seisan, and passai kata. Of these, shirokuma and seisan are still taught at Motobu Kenpō. Motobu Chōsei also studied karate under Motobu Chōmei, Motobu Choyū's oldest son. He also studied under Uehara Seikichi, who was a student of Chōyū. Thus, the current Motobu Kenpō inherits Chōyū's kata. Thus, the kata currently inherited by Motobu Kenpō are as follows.

- Naihanchi Shodan
- Naihanchi Nidan
- Shirokuma
- Seisan
- Passai gwa (passai sho variation).
- Ufukun: an itosu no kushanku variation. (Kūsankū Dai)

=== Kumite ===
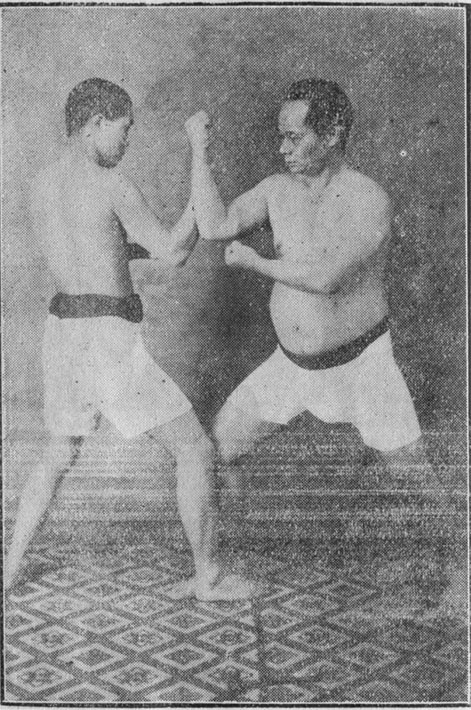
Motobu Chōki performing kakidi (1926)

Motobu Kenpō is characterized by its emphasis on kumite as well as kata. Motobu Chōki learned kakidi (kakede in Japanese), an ancient form of kumite from Sakuma and Kōsaku Matsumora, and it is practiced at Motobu Kenpō to this day. He also favored kumite matches based on this kakidi form, called kakidamishi (kakedameshi in Japanese). Kakidamishi is often mistaken for brawling, but it was a rules-based kumite match.

Motobu published 12 yakusoku kumite (pre-arranged kumite) in 1926, which are the oldest yakusoku kumite in existence and are still practiced in Motobu Kenpō. Unlike modern karate, many techniques of punching and kicking are used from holding the opponent's arm. Punching techniques include not only the straight punch (choku-zuki), but also the back fist strike (uraken-uchi) and the elbow strike (hiji-uchi). Kicking techniques include the knee kick (hiza-geri) and the side kick (sokutō-geri) as well as the front kick (choku-geri).

Motobu Chōsei, who succeeded his father Chōki, created 50 ippon kumite (one-step kumite) kumite in 1950 based on the basic kumite techniques he learned from his father.

=== Philosophy ===
Motobu Chōki's emphasis on naihanchi has given rise to the myth that he only knew the kata, when in fact he mastered and taught multiple kata as described above. However, it is also true that he believed that naihanchi contained all of the principles of karate. Below are some of Motobu's sayings on naihanchi and the principles of karate.

- All is spontaneity and transformation.
- Kamae is on the inside, not on the outside.
- Me-oto-de is a principle of karate that must be adhered to at all times. Even in everyday life -- for example, when pouring alcohol, holding a cup, or picking up chopsticks -- students of kenpō must follow this principle so as to make it a part of themselves.
- One must become able to discern the strength of another in a glance.
- Against an opponent of inferior strength, one does not have to defend against attacks one by one. One should instead oneself instantly attack.
- Karate is sente, or making the first move.
- Kassen, or engaging an opponent, is strategy.
- One cannot understand the true meaning of something without putting it into practice.
- The way the legs, hips, and lower back are used in the naihanchi kata is the basis of karate.
- In the naihanchi kata, twisting to either the right or the left is a stance that can be used in actual confrontation. Thinking of twisting to either the right or left in the naihanchi kata, one can start to understand one by one the meaning of the movements contained therein.
- A defending arm must always be able to instantly transform into an attacking arm. Defending with one arm and attacking with the other is not true bujutsu. Achieved with further development, the waza of defending and attacking at the same time is true bujutsu.
- Against true karate, a series of strikes cannot be used. That is because if an opponent's strike is blocked with true karate, the opponent will not be able to make a second move.

=== Students ===
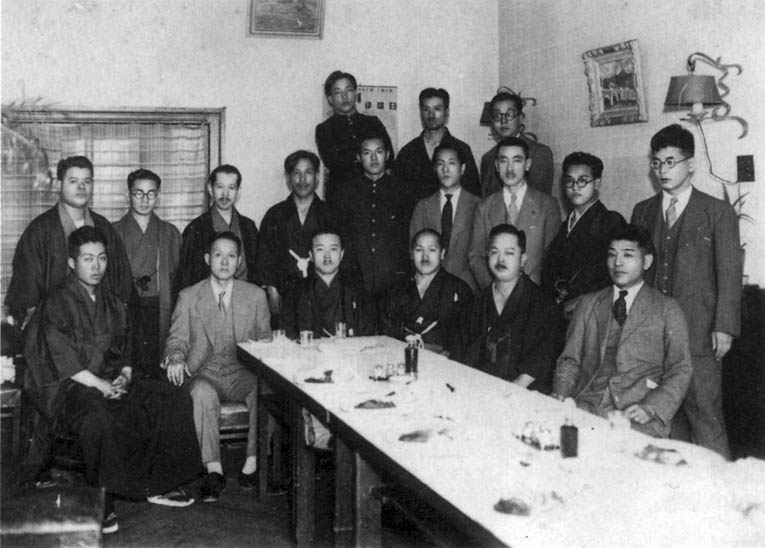
Students of Motobu Front row(l-r):Yamada, Ohtsuka, Konishi, Ueshima. (1938)

Motobu trained many students who went on to become noteworthy practitioners of karate in their own right, including:

- Nakamura Shigeru, founder of Okinawa Kenpo
- Tatsuo Yamada, founder of Nihon Kenpo Karate-dō
- Sannosuke Ueshima, founder of Kushin-ryū
- Yasuhiro Konishi, founder of Shindō jinen-ryū
- Kōsei Kokuba (Japanese: Yukimori Kuniba), founder of Seishin Kai
- Hironori Ōtsuka, founder of Wadō-ryū
- Tatsuo Shimabuku, founder of Isshin-ryū
- Shōshin Nagamine, founder of Matsubayashi-ryū
- Katsuya Miyahira, founder of Shōrin-ryū Shidōkan
- Juhatsu Kyoda, founder of Tōon-ryū

== Motobu Udundī ==
=== History ===
Motobu Udundī is a martial art that has been passed down through the Motobu family, a branch of the Ryukyuan royal family that was known as the Motobu Udun (Motobu Palace) during the Ryukyu Kingdom. Dī (literally meaning "hand") means martial arts in the Okinawan dialect. Thus, Motobu Udundī means martial arts of the royal Motobu family.

Motobu Chōyū (1865 - 1928), the 12th head of the Motobu family, inherited this martial art from his father, Chōshin, but at the age of 14 the Ryukyu Kingdom fell. He had three sons, but the downfall of the family combined with the emigration of his sons to mainland Japan made the succession of Motobu Udundī difficult.

Chōyū decided to teach Motobu Udundī to his student Uehara Seikichi, and asked Uehara to teach this martial art to his second son Chōmō, who lived in Wakayama. Uehara taught Chōmo this martial art and then emigrated to the Philippines. Chōmō, who inherited Motobu Udundī, died in Osaka in 1945 as a result of an air raid.

Upon his return from the Philippines, Uehara learned of Chōmō's death and searched for a new member of the Motobu family to succeed Motobu Udundī, but was unable to find one. In 1976, he met Motobu Chōki's son Chōsei for the first time and asked him to succeed Motobu Udundī. Chōsei accepted the offer and studied under Uehara, and in 2003 Motobu Chōsei officially succeeded Motobu Udundī as the Sōke.

=== Kata ===
Motobu Udundī has two kata of Shuri sanchin called motode (mutudī in Okinawan dialect, meaning "basic hand") or motode sanchin. The motode ichi is performed with open hands, and the motode ni is performed with fists. There are also three kata called kasshindī (meaning "battle hand"), created by Uehara Seikichi.

- Motode Ichi
- Motode Ni
- Kasshindī San
- Kasshindī Yon
- Kasshindī Go

=== Kumite ===
Since the modification of Ankō Itosu, the thrusting techniques of karate have maingly changed from nukite (spear hand) thrusting with the fingertips to fists. However, in Motobu Udundī, nukite is still common and retains the characteristics of the old style. Kicking techniques also differ from general Okinawan karate in that there are high kicking techniques. There is a high kicking technique called bō geri (bō jiri in the Okinawan dialect, literally stick kick).

Motobu Udundī does not use common karate blocking techniques such as age uke (high block), chūdan uke (middle block), and gedan barai (low block). Instead, the techniques are either used to dodge an opponent's attack with tai sabaki or tsuki uke (punch block), which is both a defense and an attack at the same time.

=== Tuitī ===
In Okinawa, jujutsu techniques such as joint locks and throws are called tuitī (torite in Japanese). The name tuitī (torite) is mentioned in the 10 precepts of karateka Ankō Itosu, though these techniques declined in Okinawa in the early 20th century. These include oshi-te (pushing hand), ogami-te (praying hand), and koneri-te (kneading hand).

=== Weapons ===
Because the Motobu family was Ryukyuan royalty, Motobu Udundī uses swords, spears, and naginata in addition to the weapons (farming and fishing tools) commonly used in Okinawan kobudō.

- Tachi (sword)
- Tantō (short sword)
- Yari (spear)
- Naginata (pole sword)
- Bō (6 ft staff)
- Jō (3 ft staff)
- Tanbō (short staff)
- Torisashi Bō (stick for catching birds)
- Uēku (oar)
- Sai
- Nunchaku
- Tonfā
- Kama (sickle)
- Hōki (broom)
