= List of Ryukyuans =

This article lists notable Ryukyuans, the indigenous people of the Ryukyu Islands, they live in either Okinawa Prefecture, or Kagoshima Prefecture within Japan in East Asia.

== Martial arts ==
- Sōkon Matsumura
- Ankō Itosu
- Ankō Asato
- Kenwa Mabuni (Shitō-ryū)
- Gichin Funakoshi (Shotokan)
- Chōjun Miyagi (Gōjū-ryū)
- Chōki Motobu (Motobu-ryu)
- Tatsuo Shimabuku (Isshin-ryū)
- Kanbun Uechi (Uechi-ryū)
- Kentsū Yabu (Shōrin-ryū)

== Academics, journalism, and literature ==
- Sai On
- Shō Shōken
- Tei Junsoku
- Iha Fuyū
- Higashionna Kanjun
- Ōta Chōfu, journalist
- Tatsuhiro Oshiro, novelist
- Kushi Fusako, novelist

== Music ==
- Awich
- Namie Amuro
- Begin
- Beni
- Cocco
- Da Pump
- Gackt, singer-songwriter and actor
- Chitose Hajime
- High and Mighty Color
- MAX
- Mongol800
- Orange Range
- Speed
- Stereopony

== Visual arts ==
- Mao Ishikawa (born 1953), photographer
- Yuken Teruya (born 1973), sculptor, visual artist
- Chikako Yamashiro (born 1976), filmmaker

== Entertainment ==
- Yui Aragaki (born 1988), model, actress, known for her role in the TV drama The Full-Time Wife Escapist
- Rino Nakasone, choreographer
- Fumi Nikaido, actress, model
- Manami Higa, actress known for her role in the film My Teacher

== Sports ==
- Nagisa Arakaki (born 1980), baseball player
- Hideki Irabu (1969–2011), baseball player
- Yukiya Arashiro, bicycle racer
- Kazuki Ganaha, football
- Yoko Gushiken, boxer
- Akinobu Hiranaka, boxer
- Katsuo Tokashiki, boxer
- Daigo Higa (born 1995), boxer
- Ai Miyazato, golfer
- Ken Gushi, drifter

== Ryukyuans in the diaspora ==
=== In Hawaii ===
- Ethel Azama (1934–1984) jazz singer of Okinawan descent
- Ryan Higa (born 1990), YouTuber
- David Ige (born 1957), former governor of Hawaii
- Yeiki Kobashigawa (1917–2005), U.S. World War II soldier and Medal of Honor recipient
- Yoshi Oyakawa (born 1933), Olympic gold medalist
- Jake Shimabukuro (born 1976), ukulele player

=== Other parts of the United States ===
- Kishi Bashi, musician
- Yuki Chikudate, singer
- Tamlyn Tomita, actor
- Brian Tee, actor
- Natasha Allegri, storyboard artist
- Dave Roberts, baseball player and coach
- Maya Higa, YouTuber and conservationist

=== In other countries ===
- Takeshi Kaneshiro, actor in Taiwan
- Sakura Miyawaki, singer in South Korea, member of the idol group Le Sserafim

== Notable fictional characters ==
- Mr. Miyagi, played by Pat Morita from the Karate Kid trilogy
- Mugen from the anime series Samurai Champloo
- Mutsumi Otohime from the manga series Love Hina
- Maxi from the Soulcalibur series of video games
- Ryota Miyagi from the manga and anime series Slam Dunk
- Yuri Miyazono, the lead protagonist of the Witchblade: Ao no Shōjo novels
- Nanjo Takeshi, Arakaki Mari, and Ryuzuka, characters in the 1973 film Bodigaado Kiba: Hissatsu sankaku tobi
- Shisa from the manga and anime series Chiikawa
