= Harold G. Long =

American martial artist

- Born: 3 September 1930; Rockwood, Tennessee
- Died: October 12, 1998 (aged 68); Knoxville, Tennessee; Cancer
- Style: Isshinryu Karate
- Teacher: Tatsuo Shimabuku
- Rank: Jūdan 十段 10th Dan

Other information
- Occupation: Martial arts instructor
- Spouse: Doris Witsberger
- Children: Richard, Michael, Gary
- Notable schools: International Isshinryu Karate Association (IIKA); United States Isshinryu Karate Association (USIKA)
- Website: www.usika.com

Harold Gene Long (3 September 1930 – 12 October 1998) was an American martial artist and an Isshinryu karate pioneer. He founded the Isshinryu Hall of Fame and was the second person inducted, with founding Grandmaster, Tatsuo Shimabuku, being the first. Long achieved the rank of Jūdan (10th degree). He was a co-founder of the International Isshin-ryu Karate Association, and also served as the vice president of the United States Karate Association. He co-produced the first nationally televised Isshinryu Hall of Fame Karate Tournament (1992), co-produced an instructional video series (1991) and co-authored seven books. Shortly after Long's death, his student and co-author, Phil Little, fulfilled Long's goal of creating the United States Isshin-ryu Karate Association.

== Background ==
Born in Rockwood, Tennessee, Long attended elementary school in Petros, Tennessee and played football at Central High School in Wartburg, Tennessee. He joined the United States Marine Corps on January 12, 1950 and fought in the battle Battle of Chosin Reservoir (27 November to 13 December 1950).

Long married Doris Witsberger on October 18, 1952, in Wheeling, West Virginia. The couple had three sons, Richard, Michael, and Gary. They divorced in December 1988.

== Career ==
While stationed at Marine Corps Base Camp Courtney in Okinawa, Japan from July 1957 to August 1958, he petitioned to study Isshinryu under Tatsuo Shimabuku in Chan (Kyan) Village. He was accepted on his third visit to Shimabuku's dojo, and spent the next year, dedicating eight hours per day to his training. Long's promotions to 1st Dan (1958), 6th Dan (1958), and 8th Dan (1966) were awarded by Shimabuku, and his 7th Dan (1963) was awarded by Robert Trias and the USKA. Long's 9th (1981) and 10th Dan (1988) were awarded by his association, the International Isshin-ryu Karate Association.

Long opened his first Dojo at Marine Corps Air Ground Combat Center in Twentynine Palms, California, where he taught in his backyard until his discharge from the Marine Corps, in July 1959. Upon his return to East Tennessee, he established a dojo at the Marine Reserve Training Center, in February 1961. In 1966, Long was appointed U.S. representative of the American-Okinawan Karate Association (AOKA).

The rules for kata and kumite were adopted at the United States Karate Association's first World Karate Tournament in Chicago, Illinois in July 1963. Long proposed the majority the competition rules with John Keehan, Phil Koeppel, George Mattson, Anthony Mirakian, Roy Oshiro, Don Nagle, Ed Parker, Kim Reeves, Wendell Reeves, Jhoon Rhee, Mas Tsuruoka and Robert Trias also in the committee. The rules adopted from this meeting serve all United States karate tournaments, regardless of style.

Returning to Okinawa in the fall of 1974, Long's plans for the International Isshin-ryu Karate Association (IIKA), gained the endorsement of Tatsuo Shimabuku before his passing in May 1975. Upon Shimabuku's passing, Long became the IIKA legacy's patriarch and a senior Grandmaster of Isshin-ryu.

In addition to teaching at his Knoxville, Tennessee dojo, Long published a series of books and instructional videotapes. He was inducted into the Isshinryu Hall of Fame in June 1981 and the World Karate Union Hall of Fame in November 1997.

Long retired from teaching in December 1995, but continued to represent Isshin-ryu Karate at public events for two more years. Long's dedication to Tatsuo Shimabuku and his Isshinryu style spanned 44 years.

In September 1998, Long was diagnosed with pancreatic cancer. He died on October 12, 1998. He was laid to rest on October 15, 1998, his final resting place is at the Oak Grove Cemetery in Rockwood, Tennessee.

=== Legacy bestowal ===
Prior to Long's death, he confirmed his desire for Phil Little to inherit the Shimabuku-Long Isshinryu legacy. On September 23, 1998, Grandmaster Long bestowed the 10th degree rank of Jūdan, his personal Isshinryu Karate belongings and his vision of the creation of an umbrella group, the United States Isshinryu Karate Association, (U.S.I.K.A.), to Phil E. Little. In consultation with the World Head of Family Sokeship Council, and in deference to surviving Don Nagle, Little elected to forgo displaying his 10th degree ranking for the remainder of Nagle's lifetime (April 5, 1938 – August 23, 1999).

=== Publications ===
==== Books ====
===== Harold G. Long and Allen Wheeler =====
- The Dynamics of Isshin-Ryu Karate, National Paperback Books (1978) OCLC 4114823
- The Dynamics of Isshinryu Karate, Book Two, National Paperback Books (1979) OCLC 17734299
- The Dynamics of Isshinryu Karate, Book Three, National Paperback Books (1980) OCLC 14523128 ISBN 9780898260069
- Counter-attack!: How to Survive on the Street as Taught by the Isshinryu Black Belts, National Paperback Books (1983) OCLC 13347450

===== Others =====
- Okinawan Weapons: Bo Fighting Techniques, National Paperback Books, by H. Long and P. Little, ISBN 978-0898260229 (1987)
- Who's Who in Isshin-Ryu, National Paperback Books, by H. Long, P. Manis and T. McGhee, (1981) OCLC 27053053 ISBN 0898260078
- Isshin-Ryu Karate – The Ultimate Fighting Art, Isshin-Ryu Productions, H. Long and T. McGhee, ISBN 978-0965845908 (1997)
- Okinawan Weapons: Sai and Tonfa Fighting Techniques, Isshinryu Productions, by H. Long and P. Little, ISBN 978-0965845915 (1997)

==== Video and television ====
- Co-produced an eight tape instructional video series, Isshin-Ryu Karate (1991)
- Co-produced an eight tape instructional video series, Isshinryu karate : the ultimate self-defense (1991–92) OCLC 54836921

Vol. 1 -Basics, Seisan & Seiunchin Kata
Vol. 2 -Naihanchin, Wansu & Chinto Katas
Vol. 3 -Kusanku, Sunsu & Sanchin Katas
Vol. 4 -Tokumine Bo, Urashi Bo, Shishi Bo, Bo-Bo Kumite
Vol. 5 -Kusanku Sai, Chatan Yara Sai, Tuifa & Bo-Sai Kumite
Vol. 6 -Kumite Techniques
Vol. 7 -Basic Self-Defense Techniques
Vol. 8 -Basic Self-Defense for Women (1992) OCLC 30406982

- Isshin-Ryu Hall of Fame Karate Tournament (1992)

== Events and milestones ==
Harold G. Long (honorifics)
Year	Activity	Organization
1974	Founded	International Isshin~Ryu Karate Association (IIKA)
1979	Founded	Isshinryu Hall of Fame (1980 induction of founding Grandmaster Tatsuo Shimabuku)
1981	Inducted	Isshinryu Hall of Fame
1991	Founded	Isshin-Ryu Black Belt Society
1993	Inducted	Knoxville Sports Hall of Fame, in Knoxville, Tennessee
1995	Membership	Tao of the Fist Martial Arts Fraternity
1996	Membership	World Head of Family Sokeship Council for Isshin-Ryu Karate
1996	Golden Lifetime Achievement Award of Honor	World Karate Union
1996	Master Instructor of the Year Award	World Karate Union
1997	Doctorate degree conferred	College of Martial Arts
1998	Golden Life Achievement Award	World Head of Family Sokeship Council Hall of Fame
1998	Martial Arts Pioneer Award	World Head of Family Sokeship Council Hall of Fame
1998	Inducted	World Karate Union Hall of Fame
1998	Inducted	World Head of Family Sokeship Council Hall of Fame
1998	Inducted	Universal Martial Arts Hall of Fame
1998	Living Legend Award	World Head of Family Sokeship Council
