= Advincula =

Advincula is a surname. Notable people with the surname include:

- Arcenio James Advincula (born 1938), American martial artist
- Jose Advincula (born 1952), Filipino Roman Catholic cardinal and archbishop
- Luis Advíncula (born 1990), Peruvian footballer
- Paul Advincula (born 1964), Filipino basketball coach

== See also ==
- 23017 Advincula, a main-belt asteroid
