= Motobu Chōyū =

Okinawa karateka

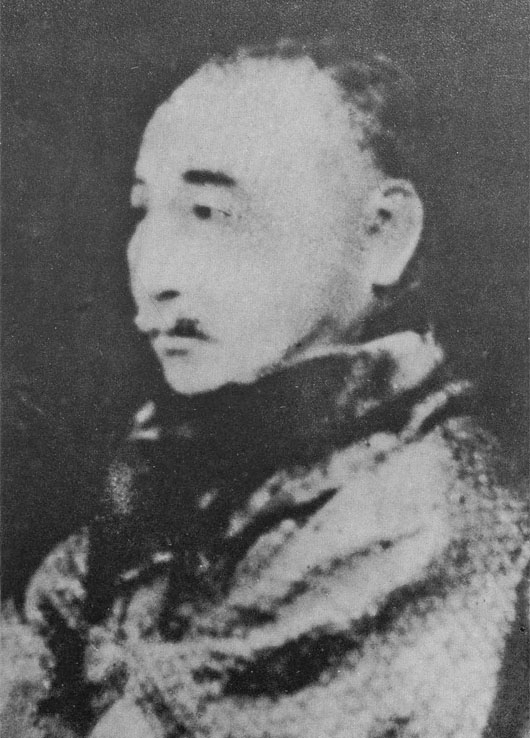
- Motobu Chōyū
- Born: May 2, 1865; Akahira Village, Shuri, Ryūkyū Kingdom
- Died: March 21, 1928 (aged 62); Shuri, Okinawa, Japan
- Style: Shuri-te, Motobu-ryū
- Teachers: Motobu Chōshin, Matsumura Sōkon, Itosu Ankō, Matsumora Kōsaku

Other information
- Notable students: Uehara Seikichi, Kaneshima Shinsuke, Tsuyoshi Chitose
- Website: Motobu-ryu

Motobu Chōyū (本部 朝勇; May 2 1865 - March 21 1928) was an Okinawan martial artist. He was also Ryukyuan royalty and the 11th sōke ("family head") of the Motobu Udun (本部御殿), a branch of the Ryukyuan royal family. His younger brother was a karate master, Motobu Chōki.

== Life ==
Motobu Chōyū was born in 1865 in Shuri Akahira, the capital of the Ryukyu Kingdom, the first son of father Chōshin and mother Ushi. His father, Prince Motobu Chōshin (Motobu Aji Chōsin) was a descendant of Shō Kōshin, aka Prince Motobu Chōhei (1655 - 1687), the sixth son of Shō Shitsu (1629–1668), the King of Ryukyu. The Motobu family was one of the cadet branches of the Ryukyuan royal family called the Motobu Udun ("Motobu Palace") and was one of the most prominent families in Okinawa.

Chōyū learned the martial art passed down in the Motobu family, called ushu-ganashi-mē no bugei, or "the king's martial art," from the age of six. He then studied Shuri-te karate and koryū ("old school") Japanese martial arts under the legendary karateka Matsumura Sōkon.

In 1881, Chōyū invited Itosu Ankō to the palace of the Motobu Udun, where he and his brother Chōki learned karate from him. From the age of 24 or 25, Chōyū, along with his younger brother Chōki and his friend Kentsū Yabu, began studying under Matsumora Kōsaku from Tomari.

Chōyū had three sons, but the downfall of the family combined with the emigration of his sons to mainland Japan made the succession of Motobu Udundī difficult. He decided to teach Motobu Udundī to his student Uehara Seikichi, and asked Uehara to teach this martial art to his second son Chōmō, who lived in Wakayama.

In March 1918, Motobu Chōyū, along with other martial arts masters, was invited to a martial arts seminar at the Okinawa Prefectural Normal School. He demonstrated the kata of Shōchin (Motobu-shi Sōchin).

Uehara went to Wakayama in 1923 and spent six months teaching Chōmo the techniques he had learned from Chōyū.

In 1926, together with Miyagi Chōjun, Chōyū founded the Okinawa Karate Research Club in Naha and became its president. In 1928, he became ill and died. The Motobu Udun tomb where Motobu Chōyū also rests is designated as a historic site in Ginowan City, Okinawa Prefecture, as a tomb of Ryukyuan royalty.

== Historic Sites ==
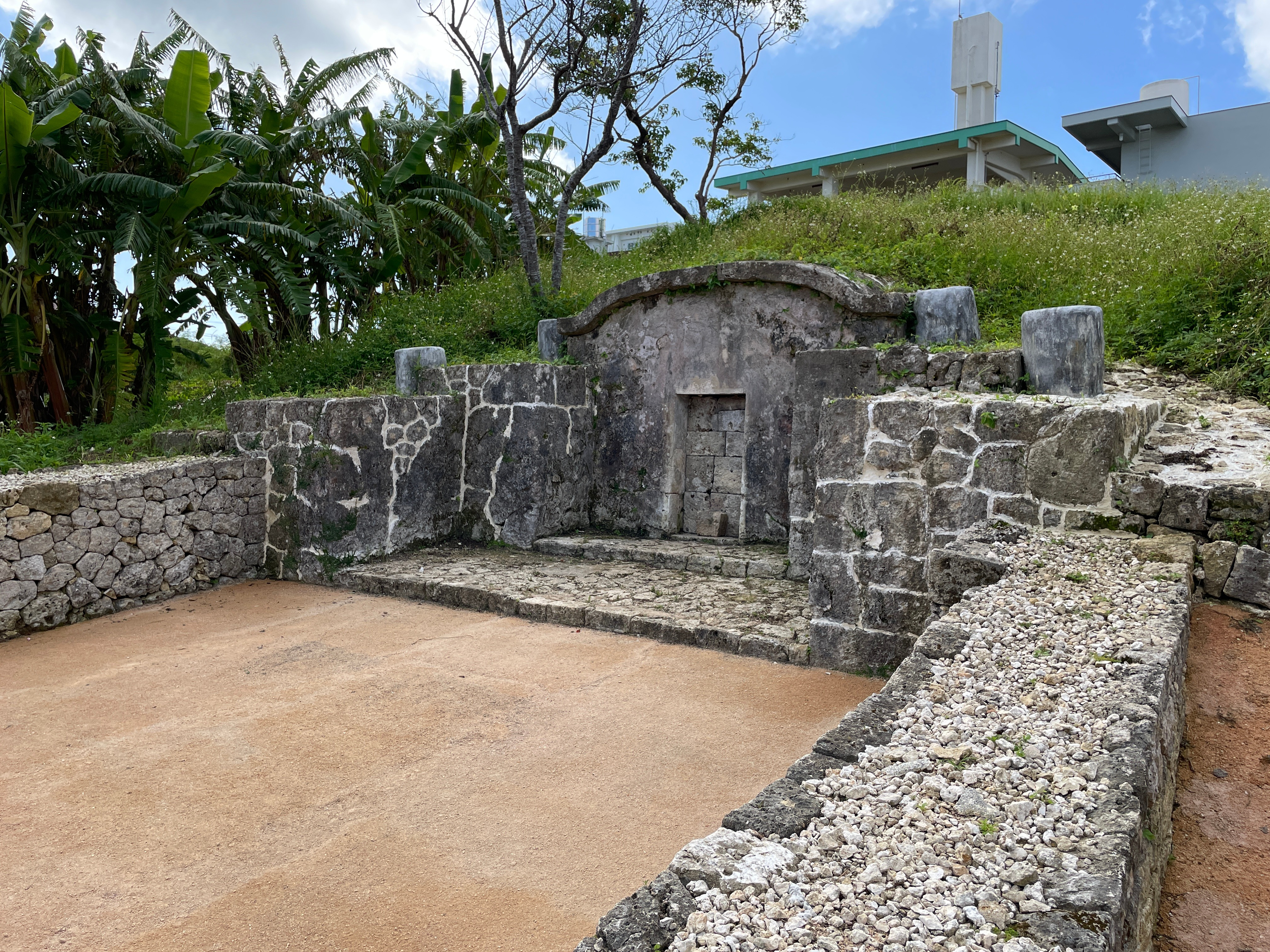
Motobu Udun Tomb Inner Yard

The family tomb is the Motobu Udun Tomb in Ganeko, Ginowan. On February 25, 2021, the Motobu Udun Tomb was designated a cultural property historical site by Ginowan City in recognition of its high value as a material that unravels the relationship between Ginowan District and royal descendants at that time. It has since become a major spot for karate tourist visiting from all over the world.

== See also ==
Pechin/Peichin
