= Arcenio James Advincula =

American martial artist (born 1938)

Arcenio James Advincula is a martial artist and a first-generation student of the founder of Isshin-ryū Karate, Tatsuo Shimabuku. He also has an extensive background in Largo Mano Eskrima, Hindiandi Gung Fu, Ryukyu Kobudo and Combat Judo. He is a veteran of the United States Marine Corps who served for 22 years, 6 months, 18 days including two tours in Vietnam during the Vietnam War. He retired in 1981 as a Master Sergeant.

Some of his other notable accomplishments include; designing the Isshinryu patch, receiving a Black Belt Emeritus from the United States Marine Corps, working with the San Diego Chargers on body mechanics, selected by the Okinawan Government to represent the U.S. at the 2005 Okinawa Karate and Kobudo Exchange Symposium.

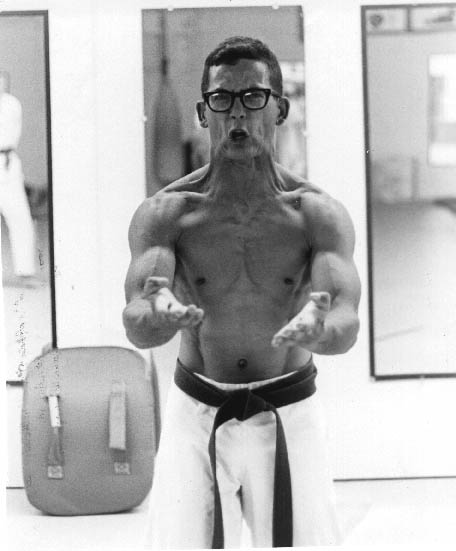
A. J. Advincula practicing Sanchin Kata, 1979

== Early years ==
Advincula was born in Juneau, Alaska, on January 25, 1938. When World War Two broke out Advincula's father, who was Filipino, brought him to a Filipino family by the name of Diaz to take care of him. His father left for Anchorage where he worked for the U. S. Army Air Corps at Elmendorf Air Base. At the conclusion of the war in 1945 Advincula was reunited with his father in Anchorage.

Advincula began his Martial Arts training in 1946 at the age of 8. His father hired two of his friends who were close-combat instructors for the Philippine Army, Pete Rado and Tony Navarro, to train him. Pete Rado began teaching Advincula Escrima knife fighting and Tony Navarro began teaching him knife fighting with a K-Bar. They both taught him Combat Judo. Around this time his father bought him a Springfield Navy Training Rifle and he started rifle and bayonet training as well.

== Military background ==
Advincula's active duty career in the United States Marine Corps spanned 24 years and began on April 30, 1957, when he enlisted at Anchorage, Alaska, at the age of 19. During the course of his career he served 2 tours in Vietnam, one of which was ended by a back injury. He returned to Vietnam for about 40 days in 1975 after volunteering to assist in Operation Frequent Wind, the evacuation of U.S. citizens and allies before the impending fall of South Vietnam. Some of the highlights of his distinguished military service include the following:

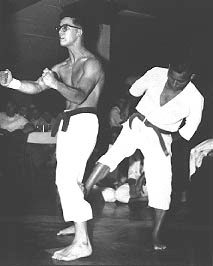
Camp Hansen Okinawa - 1963

- Enlisted in the United States Marine Corps in Anchorage, Alaska, 30 April 1957 at the age of 19
- Went through Boot Camp at MCRD San Diego, CA (May-Aug 1957)
- Assigned to the First Pioneer Battalion (MOS 1371 Combat Engineer) Camp Pendleton, California

later redesignated on 1 May 1963 as the First Engineer Battalion

- Assigned to Okinawa - Camp S. D. Butler - 26 November 1958 for a 13½-month tour (concluded first tour on Okinawa 10 March 1960)

began training with Shimabuku in Agena Dojo 12/1/58
began teaching close combat training

- Returned to Alaska (3 April 1960). Released from Active Duty 18 April 1960

began teaching Karate in Anchorage

- Returned to Okinawa as a civilian on 2 January 1961

married in Naha, Okinawa 23 January 1961
designed Megami Patch with consent of Tatsuo Shimabuku

- Returned to Alaska May 1961
- Reenlisted for active duty 25 September 1961
- Returned to Okinawa on active duty 28 November 1961

TAD to Philippines (March - April 1962)
TAD to Philippines (May - August 1962)
TAD to Korea (June - July 1963)
TAD to Taiwan (February - March 1964)

- 18 November 1964 returned to Marine Corps Base Camp Pendleton

opened dojo in Carlsbad with Harold Mitchum and Paul Heffernan

- 24 August 1965 - 15 August 1966 deployed to Camp Love, Danang Vietnam as a member of Bravo Company, 7th Engineer Battalion,1st Marine Division
- 28 September 1966 - 13 January 1969 Stationed at Maint Co. H&S Battalion, Marine Corps Base (MCB) 29 Palms, California
- Returned to Vietnam 16 March 1969

sustained an injury to his back and was MEDEVACed to Okinawa (30 June 1969) and assigned to Casual Company, Camp S. D. Butler (to 16 March 1970).

- 22 April 1970 - 27 August 1972 assigned to Headquarters Company, H&S Battalion, Parris Island, SC
- 28 August 1972 - 2 January 1975 assigned to "F" Company, 2nd Recruiting and Training Battalion, Parris Island, SC
- 16 January 1975 - 8 February 1976 reassigned to Okinawa

returned to Vietnam as part of "Operation Frequent Wind", to assist in the evacuation of U.S. citizens and allies during the fall of South Vietnam, April 1975

- 21 April 1981 retired from the United States Marine Corp as Master Sergeant, after 22 ½ years of distinguished service to his country.

=== Military decorations ===
Advincula's personal decorations include (Foreign and non-U.S. personal and unit decorations are in order of precedence based on military guidelines and award date):

- Navy and Marine Corps Commendation Medal
- Navy and Marine Corps Achievement Medal w/ "V" Valor device & 1 service star
- Presidential Unit Citation
- Navy Unit Commendation
- Navy Meritorious Unit Commendation
- Marine Corps Good Conduct Medal w/ 6 service stars
- National Defense Service Medal
- Armed Forces Expeditionary Medal w/ 1 service star
- Vietnam Service Medal w/ 4 service stars
- Humanitarian Service Medal w/ 2 service stars
- Sea Service Deployment Ribbon
- Republic of Vietnam Gallantry Cross Unit Citation w/ Palm & Frame

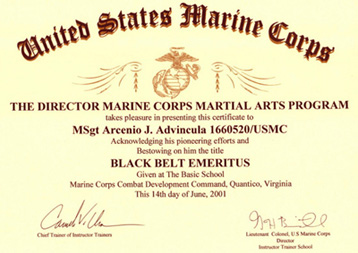
A. J. Advincula's Marine Corps Martial Arts Black Belt Emeritus Certificate

- Republic of Vietnam Civil Action Unit Citation
- Republic of Vietnam Campaign Medal (1960-)

=== USMC legacy ===
- 1996 Established use of the vertical punch at USMC Recruit Depot in San Diego, California.
- 1997 The Marine Corps adopted Advincula's rifle & bayonet/knife and close combat :system by holding the rifles pistol grip in bayonet fighting instead of changing the grip and holding the rear stock of the rifle.
- 2001 Received Black Belt Emeritus from USMC for helping to pioneer the Marine Corps Martial Arts program.

== Martial arts background ==
=== Escrima/Knife/Combat Judo ===
Began in 1946 at the age of eight. Instructors were Pete Rado and Tony Navarro, both of whom were Filipino Scouts and close combat instructors. Pete Rado taught Advincula escrima and Tony Navarro knife fighting. Later he trained with Loi Miranda in Alaska (1961).

=== Hindiandi Gung Fu ===
In 1961, after returning to Okinawa, Advincula encountered an Okinawan friend with whom he had worked during his prior active duty. The man, Nago Shinu, asked him if he would like to meet "#1 strong man on Okinawa". Advincula at first declined because he thought Nago was talking about a weight lifter and he had no interest. Nago explained that he was referring a man who had studied Martial Arts in China. When he found this out he agreed accepted the invitation. He and Gayle Beams, who was one of his students at the Anchorage Dojo (see Isshinryu section below) went with Nago to meet Kang Kaneshiro (Kinjo) in Hamada. Kaneshiro initially agreed to teach Advincula but not Beams. He later accepted Beams as a student as well after Advincula requested that he do so.

Later, when Advincula began Ryu Kon Kai kobudo training with Kotaro Iha, he found out that one of the instructors in Iha's dojo, Aka Seiko, was a cousin of Kaneshiro.

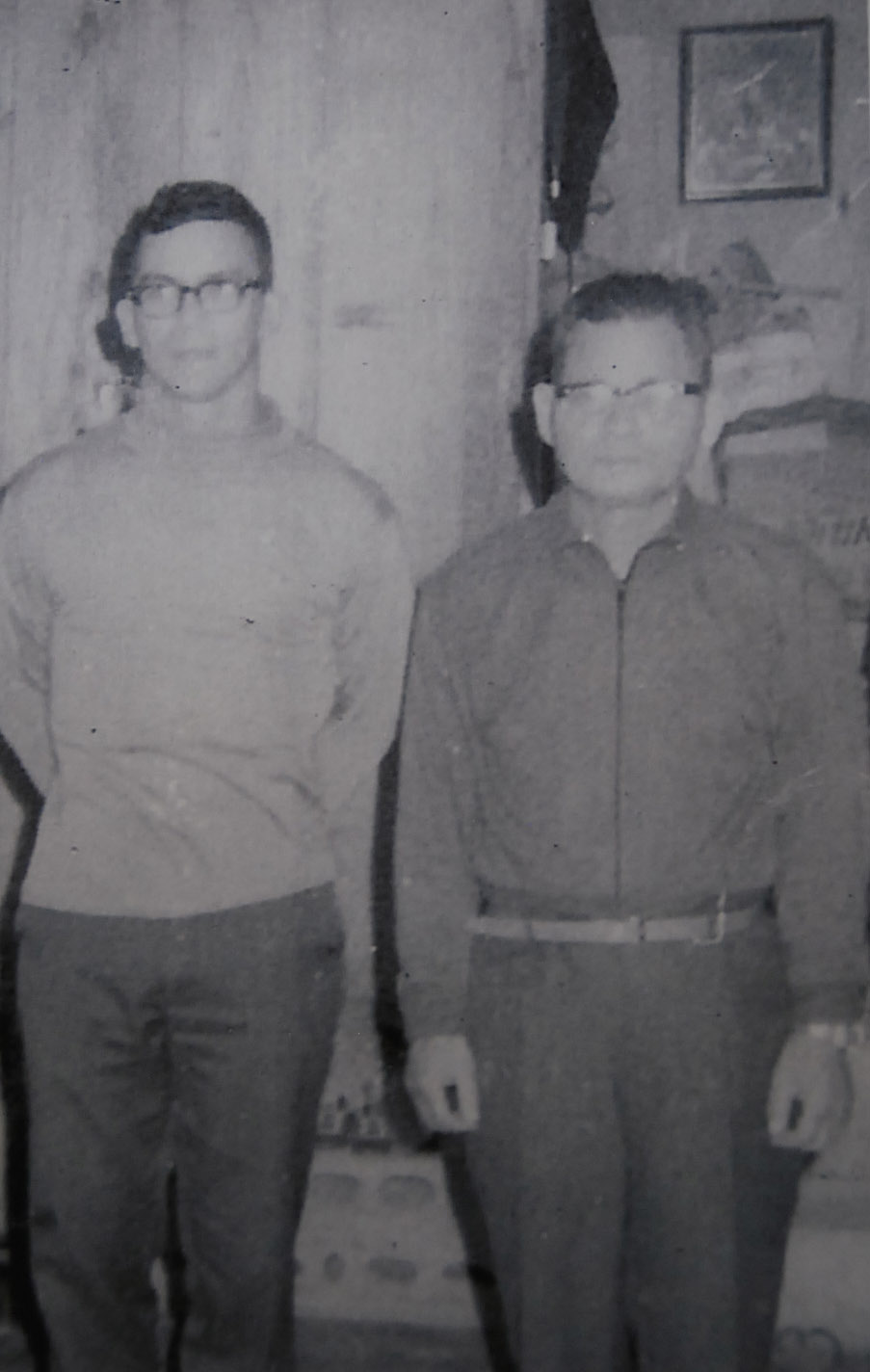
Advincula with Shimabuku

=== Shorin Ryu ===
Advincula began training in Shorinryu with Segin Nagamine at Kin Village, Okinawa in 1962.

=== Goju Ryu ===
Trained in Gojuryu with Kinei Nakasone and Masanobu Shinjo (Nakasone's teacher) beginning in 1963 at Kin village & at New Koza, Okinawa.

=== Uechi Ryu ===
Began studying Uechi-ryu from Kosuke Yonamine at Koza, Okinawa, 1975 after the death of Shimabuku.

=== Ryu Kon Kai Ryukyu Kobudo ===
In 1975 started training in Ryu Kon Kai kobudo from Kotaro Iha at Taba village, Okinawa. After Shimabuku died, Advincula's brother in law asked him if he would like to continue his kobudo training with Iha, his friend. He has continued his relationship with Iha to this day and he was promoted to Nanadan and received his Shihan Menkyo (Instructors License) in Ryukonkai Kobudo from Iha in September 2009.

=== Isshinryu ===
Advincula was first stationed on Okinawa in late November 1958. After he had completed his check in sheet and was reporting to his NCOIC he saw a sign for judo classes and he asked the NCOIC about the classes. The NCOIC, who was a Green Belt in Isshinryu, asked him if he would like to try karate and told Advincula that he would take him to meet "Papasan" on Advincula's first liberty. Advincula accepted the invitation and on December 1, 1958, he went to the Agena Dojo and met Shimabuku for the first time. Advincula trained with Shimabuku regularly until his departure from Okinawa nearly fourteen months later. After returning to Alaska in April 1960 he opened his first dojo in Anchorage, teaching out of a health club facility.

Advincula returned to Okinawa as a civilian on January 2, 1961. He once again began training with Shimabuku at the Agena Dojo. It was during this period that Advincula received the consent of Shimabuku to design and have made the Isshinryu Megami patch. This is the only patch that is known to have been approved by Shimabuku.

Around May 1961 Advincula returned to Alaska but shortly thereafter (25 September 1961) he re-enlisted for active duty and he returned to Okinawa in November 1961. He continued his Isshinryu training with Shimabuku at this time.

In late 1964 Advincula was reassigned to Camp Pendleton and he returned to California, where he opened a dojo in Carlsbad, California, with H. Mitchum.

In August 1965 he was deployed to the Republic of Vietnam to serve a 12-month tour (see Military Background). He returned to California once again in August 1966.

In February 1969 he returned to Vietnam for his second tour of duty. After he sustained an injury he was med-evaced to Okinawa and assigned to Casual Company, Camp Butler. He continued his training with Shimabuku once again.

Upon completion of his tour Advincula was assigned to Parris Island, SC from April 1970 until January 1975 at which time he was once again stationed on Okinawa. It was during this period, on May 1, that Kichiro Shimabuku opened his Kinaka dojo and hosted a Grand Opening. Advincula encouraged Shimabuku to attend and one of the last pictures of Shimabuku was taken as he left the event.

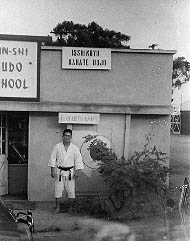
Carlsbad, CA Dojo, 1965

=== Additional martial arts highlights ===
1975 Co-founded the United Isshin-ryu Karate Association with Harold Mitchum.

1983 Made three Escrima Videos for Panther Productions.

1986 Published author in Black Belt Magazine & Wholeheart News.

1987 Black Belt Magazine Co-instructor of the year with Ray Dalke.

1988 Featured in Karate/Kung-fu Illustrated.

1996 Commemorated 50th anniversary in the martial arts.

2001 Co-founded the Isshinkai (Isshin-ryu Karatedo & Kobudo & TOMO NO KAI) with Kensho Tokumura

2002 Created Video (now DVD) series of instruction on Isshin-ryu Karate and Kobudo.

2008 Commemorated 50th anniversary in Isshin-ryu Karate.

==== Martial arts legacy ====
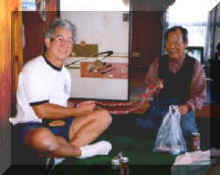
Advincula receiving Shimabuku's bo-cover from Shinsho Shimabuku 4/15/1999

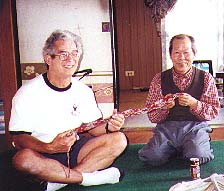
Advincula receiving Shimabuku's bo cover 4/15/1999

Advincula began hosting Okinawan cultural tours in April 1994. He takes small groups to Okinawa to meet, train and socialize with friends, family and Okinawan Martial Artists. One of the primary purposes of the tours is to give those participating an opportunity to learn about and experience the culture of Okinawa, as his teacher, Shimabuku requested: "Even if we cannot promote friendship between Okinawa and America through karate, my true hope is that if karate becomes popular in the U.S.A. and Hawaii, then Okinawa would also become more well understood."

On one of these tours, April 15, 1999, Shimabuku's second son Shinsho (Ciso) presented Advincula with his father's bo cover.

In January 2005 the government of Okinawa held the "Okinawa Karate and Kobudo Exchange Symposium". This symposium was organized to educate and demonstrate the difference between Japanese and Okinawan karate. Guests were invited from several of the different prefectures in Japan, and one guest from each of the following countries Argentina, France, Germany, Iraq, and Advincula from the United States. He was one of only five people from outside of Okinawa and Japan selected to attend.

== Additional accomplishments ==
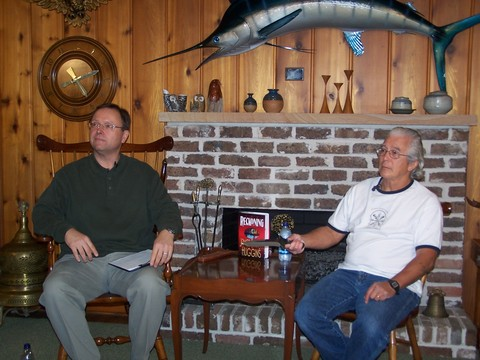
A.J. Advincula and J. Hammond preparing for interview (December 2009)

1987 to 1993 - Body Management Coach (body mechanics) of the San Diego Chargers (NFL) Football Team.

1992 Designed Fighting Knife (FleshEAteR) for knife maker, Jim Hammond.

1994 Interviewed by CNN as knife expert on O.J. Simpson case.

1994 Flesheater knife plays a major role in the 1994 action novel, The Reckoning, by James Byron Huggins. One editor said, "This book does for knife fighting what Tom Clancy did for submarine warfare."

2010 The book "The Reckoning" by James Byron Huggins is to be made into a movie with Arcenio Advincula as the martial arts choreographer and technical advisor for the knife fighting scenes.
