= Donald Hugh Nagle =

American karateka

- Died: August 23, 1999 (aged 61); Cardiac arrest
- Style: Isshin-Ryu Karate
- Teacher: Tatsuo Shimabuku
- Rank: jū-dan (十段:じゅうだん): tenth degree black belt

Other information
- Notable students: Official Student Listing

Donald Nagle was an American karate expert and instructor, as well as a Marine.

== Biography ==
Nagle was a Marine; in July 1956 he was stationed on Okinawa, in the Ryukyu Islands off the coast of Japan. There he studied karate under Tatsuo Shimabuku, who had started the Isshin-Ryu school. He was promoted to 8th-degree black belt in 1966.

The IIKA (International Isshinryu Karate Association) promoted Don Nagle to 9th-Degree black belt on November 2, 1984.

He died on August 23, 1999, a day after heart surgery at age 61.
