= Wanshū =

Karate kata

Wanshu ワンシュー
- Other names: Wansu, Wang Shu, Yun Bi, Empi/Enpi
- Martial art: Karate, Tang Soo Do
- Place of origin: Okinawa, Ryukyu Kingdom
- Creator: Wang Ji
- Date of creation: Unknown

Wanshū (ワンシュー, also 腕秀 and 汪輯) is the name of several katas in many systems of karate, including Isshin-Ryu, Shotokan (under the name Empi), Wadō-ryū, and others.

== Naming and Origin ==
The name Wanshū (腕秀) in Mandarin means "Excellent Wrist" and refers to a typical technique of this form. The other way of writing the name of this kata (汪輯) means "Wang's Series (or Form)" and refers to the name of the diplomat Wang (1621 – 1689),^{A}. Wang was the leader of a large ambassadorial mission from China sent by the Qing government in 1683 to the village of Tomari. A poet, calligrapher, diplomat, and martial artist in the Shaolin tradition of Fujian White Crane, he is often credited with teaching chu'an fa to the gentry of Tomari.

The Wanshū kata was either a creation of Wang, or composed by his students and named in tribute to him. Regardless, many karate traditions include a kata bearing the name of Wanshū or a variant (Ansu, Anshu) which vary in schematics but carry certain distinctive similarities. One translation of the word "Wanshū" is "dumping form," "dragon boy dumping form" (in Shuri-ryū), and "Strong Arm Form" for the dramatic grab-and-throw technique seen in most versions. Also Shimabuku Tatsuo is credited for being the dragon boy (though Tatsuo means "dragon man").

The two main versions are Matsumura-Wanshū and Itosu-Wanshū, Itosu most likely having learned it from his teacher, Gusukuma of Tomari. Wanshū, while still bearing this name in certain karate styles, was renamed Empi by Gichin Funakoshi for use in Shotokan. This kata is also practiced in various Korean styles such as Tang Soo Do and Soo Bahk Do and depending on the organization is called Wangshū, Wang Shu, or Yun Bi in Korean. Due to its difficulty, this kata is often reserved for advanced students.

== Footnotes ==
A.In the modern Japanese language Wang Ji is known as Ōshū (汪楫).

== See also ==
- Karate kata
