= Motobu Chōki =

Okinawan karateka

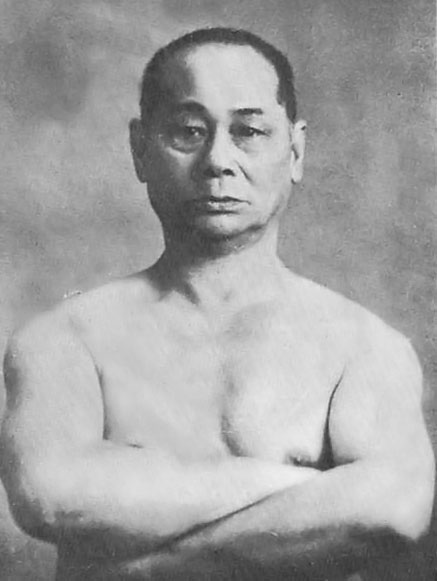
- Motobu Chōki
- Born: April 5, 1870; Akahira Village, Shuri, Ryūkyū Kingdom
- Died: April 15, 1944 (aged 74); Shuri, Okinawa Prefecture , Empire of Japan
- Style: Shuri-te, Tomari-te, Motobu-ryū
- Teachers: Sōkon Matsumura, Sakuma Pechin, Ankō Itosu, Kosaku Matsumora
- Rank: Sōke, Founder of Motobu-ryū

Other information
- Notable students: His son Chōsei Motobu, Tatsuo Yamada, Sannosuke Ueshima, Yasuhiro Konishi, Hironori Ōtsuka, Tatsuo Shimabuku, Shōshin Nagamine, Katsuya Miyahira
- Website: Motobu-ryu

Motobu Chōki (本部 朝基; April 5, 1870 – April 15, 1944) was an Okinawan karate master and founder of Motobu-ryū. He was born into a branch of the Ryukyuan royal family, and at the age of 12, he and his older brother Motobu Chōyū were invited by Ankō Itosu to be taught karate.

Motobu also studied karate under Sakuma, Matsumura Sōkon, and Kōsaku Matsumora. He excelled especially in kumite and was already known throughout Okinawa in his twenties. As he grew up, he came to be regarded as the best in Okinawa in terms of practical karate techniques. He is reported to have been very agile, which gained him the nickname Motobu no Saru ("Motobu the Monkey").

Motobu later moved to mainland Japan, and at the age of 52, he beat a foreign boxer in Kyoto, Japan, and his name became instantly known throughout the country. He distanced himself from the modernization trend in karate, focusing only on kata Naihanchi and concentrating on kumite practice.

== Early life and training ==
Motobu Chōki was born in 1870 in Shuri Akahira, the capital of the Ryukyu Kingdom, the third son of father Chōshin and mother Ushi. His father, Prince Motobu Chōshin (Motobu Aji Chōsin) was a descendant of Shō Kōshin, aka Prince Motobu Chōhei (1655 - 1687), the sixth son of Shō Shitsu (1629–1668), the King of Ryukyu. The Motobu family was one of the cadet branches of the Ryukyuan royal family called the Motobu Udun ("Motobu Palace") and was one of the most prominent families in Okinawa.

He studied karate primarily under Ankō Itosu (1831 - 1915), Sōkon Matsumura (1809 - 1899), Sakuma, and Kōsaku Matsumora (1829 - 1898), but also occasionally under Kunjan Pēchin and Kuniyoshi Shinkichi. He studied under Itosu for seven or eight years. With the abolition of the Ryukyu Kingdom, these teachers lost their jobs and became impoverished. The Motobu family was wealthy because they received income from the Japanese government as a member of the former royal family. Therefore, the Motobu family employed them as karate teachers and assisted them.

Motobu was taught Naihanchi and Channan (the original form of Pinan) by Itosu. However, under Itosu's tutelage, Motobu found it difficult to defeat his older brother, Motobu Chōyū, in kumite. Therefore, he secretly continued his training under Sōkon Matsumura and Sakuma from Shuri, and by the time he was over 20 years old, he was confident that he could defeat his brother in kumite.

From the age of 19 or 20, Motobu, along with his older brother Chōyū and his friend Kentsū Yabu, began studying under Kōsaku Matsumora. He was taught by Matsumora, especially irikumi, an ancient form of kumite, and Matsumora praised him as being very talented in the martial arts. Yabu was a good friend of Motobu's and they practiced karate together throughout their lives.

Motobu famously emphasized Naihanchi kata, but also taught Seisan, Passai, and Shirokuma (White Bear). There is a theory that Shirokuma is Channan because of its resemblance to Pinan. Furthermore, he taught Wanshū and Jitte.

== Activities in Mainland Japan ==
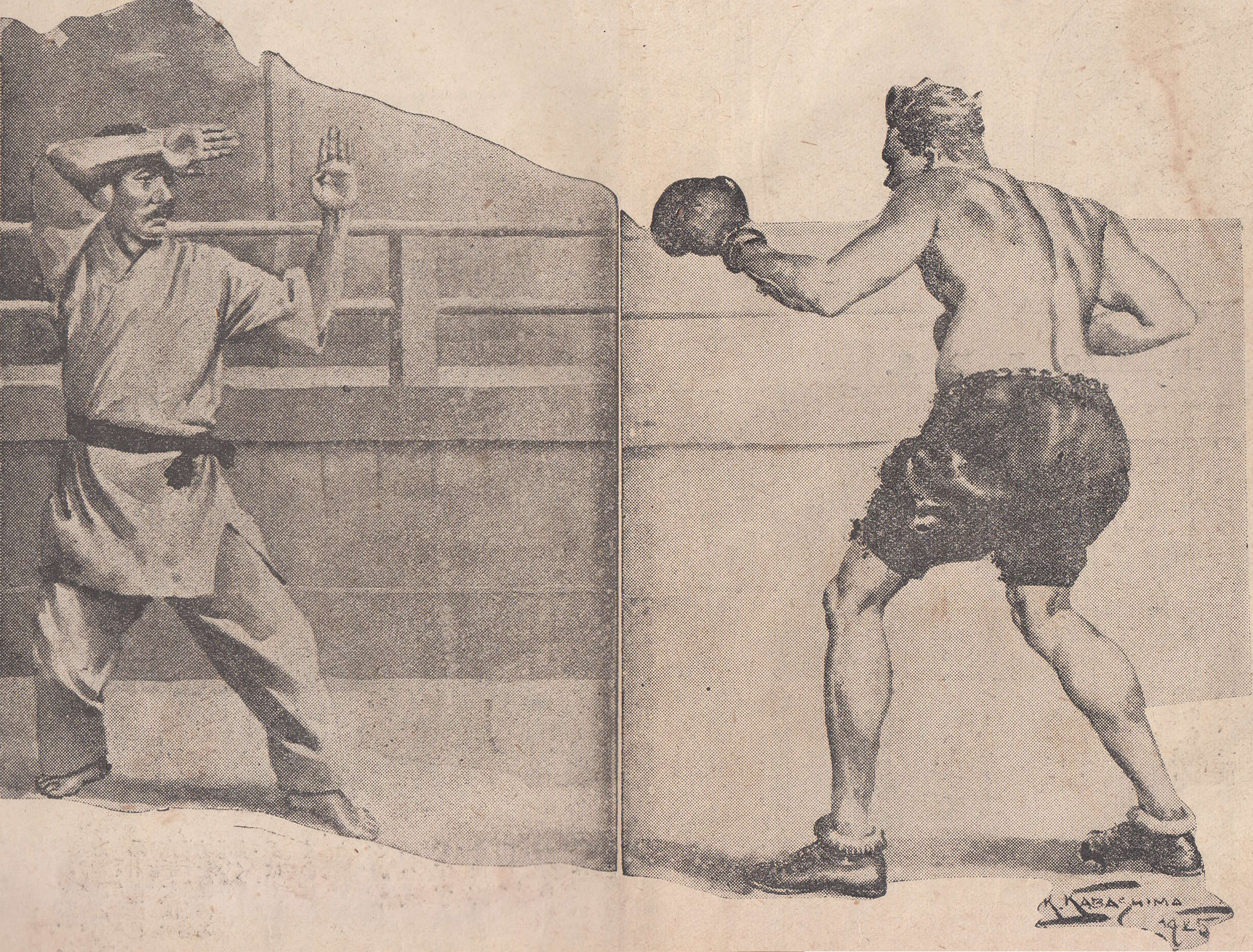
Illustration depicting a match between Motobu Chōki and a foreign boxer

=== The boxing match ===
Around 1921, Motobu moved to Osaka, Japan. In November 1922, a friend convinced Motobu to enter a "boxing vs judo" match which was taking place. These matches were popular at the time, and often pitted a visiting foreign boxer against a jujutsu or judo man. According to an account of the fight from a 1925 King magazine article, Motobu is said to have entered into a challenge match with a tall, burly foreign boxer called George. Motobu, on the other hand, recalls that the boxer was John "somebody." According to research by Charles. G. Goodin, director of the Hawaii Karate Museum, the boxer was likely to be the Estonian Jaan Kentel.

Early rounds involved evasion by the smaller man. Motobu recalls the boxer fought very sluggishly. Taking advantage of this, after a few rounds, according to the account, Motobu moved in on the taller, larger boxer and knocked him out with a single hand strike to the head. Motobu was then 52 years old.

The King article detailed Motobu's surprising victory, although the illustrations clearly show Funakoshi Gichin as the Okinawan fighter in question. The two were often at odds in their opinions about how karate ought to be taught and used.

=== Motobu-ryū Karate ===
The popularity generated by this unexpected victory propelled both Motobu and karate to a degree of fame that neither had previously known in Japan. In 1923, he opened a karate dojo in Osaka. Among his students at that time were Tatsuo Yamada and Sannosuke Ueshima. In 1926, he published his first book, Okinawa Kenpo Karate-jutsu Kumite-hen (Kumite Edition of Okinawa Kenpō Karate Art). This is the oldest book on kumite, and the 12 kumite drills presented in this book are still passed down in Motobu-ryū today.

Around 1927, Motobu moved to Tokyo to establish the Daidōkan dojo and also became the first Shihan of the karate club at Toyo University. Regular students at the dojo at that time included Higaonna Kamesuke and Marukawa Kenji. In addition, his guest students were Yasuhiro Konishi, Hironori Ōtsuka, and boxer champion "Piston" Horiguchi.

Motobu had no small amount of difficulty in teaching karate in terms of language. He moved to mainland Japan after the age of 50, so he was forced to teach exclusively in the Okinawan dialect at the dojo. As a result, those who were not pleased with his success spread a rumor that he was illiterate. This rumor has been largely discredited by the existence of samples of Motobu's handwriting, which is in a clear and literate hand. In a Tsunami video production on Motobu-ryū, Motobu Chōsei comments that his father's language difficulties may have been motivated more by protest at being a displaced member (by the Japanese annexation of Okinawa) of the Ryukyuan aristocracy than by inability.

In the fall of 1936, Motobu temporarily closed his Daidōkan dojo in Tokyo and returned to Okinawa. He then attended a roundtable meeting of karate grand masters held in Naha on October 25. He stayed in Okinawa for a while and returned to Osaka the following year. There he began teaching karate to his son Motobu Chōsei. Motobu occasionally traveled to Tokyo to teach karate, but due to deteriorating health he closed his dojo in the fall of 1941 and returned to Osaka. In June 1942 he taught karate briefly at the Tottori Agriculture High School (present-day Tottori University Faculty of Agriculture).

== Return to Okinawa ==
After moving to mainland Japan, Motobu occasionally returned to Okinawa for short periods of time. In late 1926 and 1927, Motobu returned briefly to Okinawa. On January 7, 1927, Motobu demonstrated wood-board breaking and kumite in front of Kanō Jigorō, the founder of judo, who was visiting Okinawa. He was introduced as "Okinawa's Number One" in kumite and was greatly admired by Kanō.

In late 1936, Motobu returned briefly to Okinawa again and attended a roundtable discussion of karate masters in Naha on October 25. In November, he also attended a roundtable discussion organized by young Okinawan karate practitioners. Motobu was invited as the most practical karate master.

In late 1942, Motobu returned to Okinawa, hoping to die in his hometown. He died in April 1944.

== Motobu's legacy and notable students ==
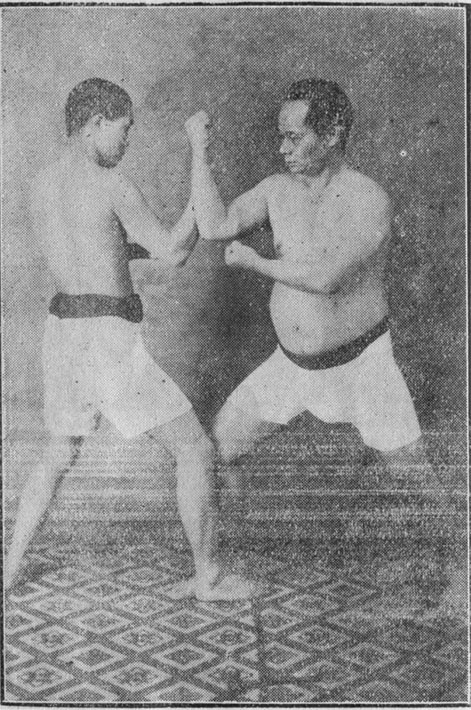
Motobu Chōki performing kakidi (1926)

Motobu Chōki's third son, Chōsei Motobu (1925- ), still teaches the style that his father passed on to him. As a point of reference, it is important to distinguish between the "Motobu-ryū" which Chōsei teaches, and "Motobu Udundi", the unique style of the Motobu family, which bears a resemblance to aikijutsu. Now Chōsei Motobu is the second Sōke of Motobu-ryū and the 14th Sōke of Motobu Udundi.

Motobu's karate is characterized by its emphasis on kumite as well as kata. He learned kakidi (kakede in Japanese), an ancient form of kumite from Sakuma and Kōsaku Matsumora, and it is practiced at Motobu-ryū to this day. He also favored kumite matches based on this kakidi form, called kakidamishi (kakedameshi in Japanese). Kakidamishi is often mistaken for brawling, but it was a rules-based kumite match.

Motobu published a series of kumite drills in 1926. These are among the earliest kumite drills. In these drills, Motobu drew on the theory of Naihanchi kata, which he emphasized, as well as on his experience in practicing kakidi and kakidamishi.

Below are some of his ideas regarding the kata:

- "The position of the legs and hips in Naifuanchin (the old name for Naihanchi) no Kata is the basics of karate."
- "Twisting to the left or right from the Naifuanchin stance will give you the stance used in a real confrontation. Twisting one's way of thinking about Naifuanchin left and right, the various meanings in each movement of the kata will also become clear."
- "The blocking hand must be able to become the attacking hand in an instant. Blocking with one hand and then countering with the other is not true bujutsu. Real bujutsu presses forward and blocks and counters in the same motion."

Motobu trained many students who went on to become noteworthy practitioners of karate in their own right, including:

- Nakamura Shigeru, founder of Okinawa Kenpo
- Tatsuo Yamada, founder of Nihon Kenpo Karate-dō
- Sannosuke Ueshima, founder of Kushin-ryū
- Yasuhiro Konishi, founder of Shindō jinen-ryū
- Kōsei Kokuba (Japanese: Yukimori Kuniba), founder of Seishin Kai
- Hironori Ōtsuka, founder of Wadō-ryū
- Tatsuo Shimabuku, founder of Isshin-ryū
- Shōshin Nagamine, founder of Matsubayashi-ryū
- Katsuya Miyahira, founder of Shōrin-ryū Shidōkan

== Historical sites ==
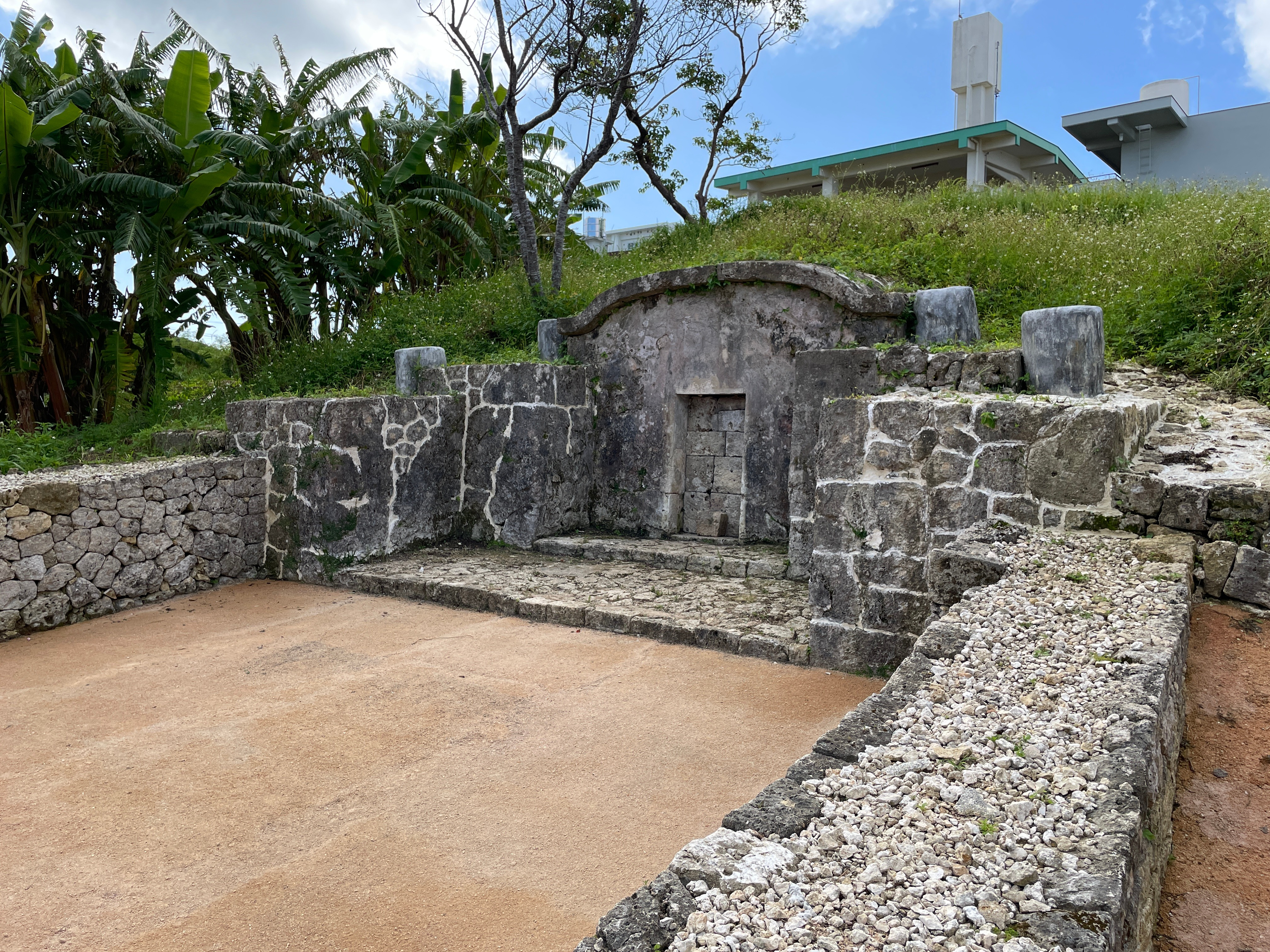
Motobu Udun Tomb Inner Yard

Though Motobu Choki was the third son and is not buried in it, the family tomb is the Motobu Udun Tomb in Ganeko, Ginowan. On February 25, 2021, the Motobu Udun Tomb was designated a cultural property historical site by Ginowan City in recognition of its high value as a place that unravels the relationship between Ginowan District and royal descendants at that time. It has since become a major tourism spot for karate tourists visiting from all over the world.

== See also ==
- Pechin/Peichin

== Additional Reading ==
- Motobu, Choki (2020) [1932]. Quast, Andreas (ed.). Watashi no Karatejutsu 私の唐手術 [My Art and Skill of Karate]. Translated by Quast, Andreas; Motobu, Naoki. Independently Published. ISBN 979-8-6013-6475-1.
- Motobu, Choki (2007) [1936]. "Bushi Motobu Chōki Ō ni 'Jissen-dan' o Kiku!" 武士・本部朝基翁に「実戦談」を聴く！ [Choki Motobu's Lost Interviews from 1936]. Classical Fighting Arts Magazine (34). Translated by Asai Ferreira, Kiko. Dragon Associates Inc. ISSN 1547-416X.
- Motobu, Chosei (2009). "Memories of My Father, Choki Motobu". Classical Fighting Arts Magazine (40). Dragon Associates Inc. ISSN 1547-416X.
- McCarthy, Patrick; McCarthy, Yuriko (2002). Motobu Choki: Karate, My Art. Australia: International Ryukyu Karate Research Group. ISBN 978-1723105609.
- Noble, Graham. "Master Motobu Choki: A Real Fighter." Dragon-Times, 2003
