= Tatsuo Shimabuku =

Okinawan karateka and the founder of Isshin-ryū

- Born: Shinkichi Shimabuku (Japanese pronunciation is Shimabukuro); September 19, 1908; Gushikawa, Okinawa, Japan
- Died: May 30, 1975 (aged 66); Itoman, Okinawa, Japan; Stroke
- Style: Karate; Gōjū-ryū, Shōrin-ryū, Isshin-ryū
- Teachers: His uncle at first, then in chronological order: Chōtoku Kyan, Chōjun Miyagi, Chōki Motobu, Taira Shinken
- Rank: Master, Founder of Isshin-ryū

Other information
- Notable students: Don Nagle, Arcenio J. Advincula

Tatsuo Shimabuku (島袋 龍夫, Shimabuku Tatsuo; September 19, 1908 – May 30, 1975) was an Okinawan, Japanese martial artist. He is the founder of Isshin-ryū ("One Heart Style/One Heart Way") style of karate.

== From childhood until World War II ==
=== Family ===
Shinkichi "Tatsuo" Shimabuku was born in Gushikawa village, Okinawa on September 19, 1908. He was the first of 10 children born into a farming family. He began his study of karate at the age of 13 from his uncle, who lived a few miles away from him in Agena Village. His maternal uncle, Shinko Ganeko, initially sent him back home, but after seeing how dedicated his nephew was he took him on as a pupil. His uncle later sent him to study with Chotoku Kyan to further study karate because he thought Tatsuo's training was incomplete.

Eizo Shimabuku (1925-2017) was Tatsuo's youngest brother, who also excelled in martial arts. Eizo studied under his elder brother, Tatsuo, in the late 1940s, and though not corroborated, is said to have also studied under the same masters as Tatsuo, such as Chotoku Kyan, Chojun Miyagi, Choki Motobu, and Shinken Taira. While the older brother went on to create his own new style of karate, Eizo quickly moved up the ranks in Shōrin-ryū (Shōbayashi). (Except there were no ranks in Okinawa in the 1920s and 1930s.)

=== Learning years ===
By the time Shimabuku was a teenager, he had attained the physical level of a person six years his senior. His karate training, and work on the family farm, gave him physical strength. He excelled in athletic events on the island. By the time he was 17, he was consistently winning in two of his favorite events, the javelin throw and the high jump.

Around the age of 19 (1927), he began to study Shorin-ryu karate under Chotoku Kyan at Kyan's home in the village of Makibaru, Yomitan Town. Kyan also taught at the Okinawa Prefectural Agricultural School. Within a short time, Shimabuku became one of Kyan's best students and learned the kata: Passai, Useishi (Gojushiho), Seisan, Naihanchi, Wansu, Chinto and Kusanku, along with the weapons kata Tokumine nu kun and basic sai. It is unclear if he learned Ananku kata. He also began his study of "Ki" (or "chinkuchi; (チンクチ)" in the Okinawan dialect) for which Kyan was most well known. Shimabuku studied with Kyan until 1939.

In 1942, Shimabuku sought out another famous Shorin-Ryu instructor, Choki Motobu, who was probably the most colorful of all of Shimabuku's instructors. Motobu had had many teachers for short periods of time, including some notable ones such as Anko Itosu (Shuri-te), Sokon Matsumura, and Kosaku Matsumora (Tomari-te). Motobu was known for often getting into street fights in his youth to promote the effectiveness of karate. Shimabuku studied with Motobu for approximately one year.

Shimabuku had always been fascinated by Naha-te karate and, in late 1946 or early 1947, sought out Chojun Miyagi, the founder of Gōjū-ryū. Miyagi's primary teacher had been Higaonna Kanryo (also called Higashionna) who brought from China a derivative of Kenpo (拳法). From Miyagi, Tatsuo learned Tensho, Seiunchin, and Sanchin kata.

Shimabuku opened his first dojo in late 1946, after the war, in the village of Konbu, near Tengan village (near where Marine Corps Base Camp Courtney was later built in 1955).

== From World War II until death ==
=== Turning point ===
Coming from a farming family, Shimabuku had always been poor, but he was very innovative and opportunistic. He had a natural talent for adapting things. As a young man in Kyan (Chan) (チャン) Village, he discovered a way to bind tiles to the roofs of homes without using mud, which had been the traditional way. During World War II, as part of the boeitai, he was forced to help construct the Yara airfield in Kadena Town with his horses and carts. During the October 10, 1944, bombing raid by the Allied Forces, he lost his horses and carts.

=== Practicing years ===
Shimabuku continued to study and develop his skills in both Shorin-Ryu and Goju-Ryu but he was not satisfied that either style held the completeness he was looking for. His interest in weapons (Kobudo) grew, and he sought out the most renowned weapons instructors, because he only knew the one bo (staff) kata, 'Tokumine no Kun' and basic sai techniques he had learned from Chotoku Kyan. He soon became a master in the Bo and Sai weapons. During the late 1950s and early 1960s, he continued his study of Kobudō with one of Moden Yabiku's top students, Shinken Taira. This training took place in Shimabuku's dojo in Agena. He learned Hamahiga nu Tuifa, Shishi nu Kun, Chatan Yara nu Sai, and Urashi nu Kun. Shimabuku created Kyan Chotoku nu Sai and Kusanku Sai using sai techniques he learned from Chotoku Kyan. To honor Chotoku Kyan, he named his first sai after him. However, Kyan nu Sai was replaced by 1960 with Kusanku Sai.

=== Creative years ===
During the late 1940s Shimabuku began experimenting with different techniques and kata from the Shorin-Ryu and Goju-Ryu systems as well as Kobudo. He briefly first called the style he was teaching Chan Mi-gwa-ti, after Chotoku Kyan's nickname Chan Mi-gwa (チャンミーグヮー). The nickname “Chan Mi-gwa”, meant “Small-eyed Chan." "Chan (チャン)", in the Okinawa dialect “Uchinaaguchi”, is “Kyan (喜屋武)." In Uchinaaguchi “mi (ミー)” means “eye." The suffix “Gwa (グヮー)” or “Guwa (グヮー)” means “small”. So Chan Mi-gwa means “Small-eyed Chan (Kyan)”. He renamed his Chan Mi-gwa-ti style "Sun nu Su-te" in about 1947 after having trained with Chojun Miyagi "Isshin-ryū" on January 15, 1956.

By the early 1950s Shimabuku was refining his karate teaching, combining what he felt was the best of the Shorin-Ryu and Goju-Ryu styles, the weapons forms he had studied, and his own techniques. As his experimentation continued, his adaptation of techniques and kata were not widely publicized. He consulted with several of the masters on Okinawa about his wish to develop a new style. Because he was highly respected as a karate master, he received their blessings. These would later be rescinded due to the many radical changes made in traditional Okinawan karate.

One night in 1955, Shimabuku fell asleep and dreamt of the goddess Guanyin (specifically Ryuzu Kannon), who told him that he had enough karate knowledge and experience, and that it was okay to go forward with his own innovative system of karate. The next morning when Shimabuku awoke, he felt that his dream had been a divine revelation and the goddess of his dream became the inspiration for the Isshin-ryu no Megami (Goddess of Isshin-ryu), which ultimately became the symbol of his unique style. Subsequently, Shimabuku had a painting commissioned by Shosu Nagamine, the uncle of one of his students, to represent the goddess of his vision. In it, three stars, symbolizing the three styles Isshin-ryu derived from, Goju-Ryu, Shorin-Ryu, and Kobudo, appeared in the sky. The stars are also interpreted as representing the Physical, Mental, and Spiritual strength needed for Isshin-ryu. The goddess remains calm despite the dark, stormy sky and turbulent water symbolizing serenity. The goddess' right hand is in a fist while her left hand is open, implying that she is peaceful but still has the ability to defend. Shimabuku also changed the goddess from simply a goddess riding a dragon, to that of a deity that is half-woman, and half-dragon.

On January 15, 1956, he met with his students and told them he was starting a new style of karate. After announcing his decision to start a new style, many of his Okinawan students, including his brother Eizo, disagreed with Shimabuku's decision and eventually left to revert back to Shorin-ryu.

In about 1947, Shimabuku changed his name to “Tatsuo,” meaning “Dragon Man.” Whenever asked about this change, Shimabuku would reply that “Tatsuo” was his professional karate name. He also was given the nickname, “Sun nu su”, by the mayor of Kyan (Chan) Village. Sun nu su was a name of a comedic boat oar dance (Ryukyu odori) that was created by Shimabuku's grandfather.

=== Teaching years ===
In February 1955, the Third Marine Division of the U.S. Marine Corps was relocated to Okinawa, and in 1957 the Marine Corps contracted Shimabuku to provide instruction to Marines on the island in their off-duty hours. As a result of his instruction, Isshin-ryū was largely spread throughout the United States by returning Marines. The karate that the Marines brought back to dojos in the United States was a blend of what Shimabuku considered the best of the karate systems.

The first of the Marines to bring Isshin-ryū karate to the United States were Don Nagle and Harold Long. Nagle opened his dojo outside Camp Lejeune, North Carolina in late 1957, while Harold Long's first dojo was in his backyard at Twenty-Nine Palms, California in late 1958. Upon discharge from service, in September 1959, Nagle returned home to Jersey City, New Jersey, and opened the first Isshin-ryū dojo in the Northeast that same year. Harold Long returned home to Knoxville, Tennessee, and later opened his first dojo at the Marine Reserve Training Center in February 1961.

Returning later were Harold Mitchum, Sherman Harill, Steve Armstrong, Ed Johnson, Walter Van Gilson, Clarence Ewing, George Breed, Jim Advincula, Bill Gardo, and Harry Smith and others. George Breed began teaching Isshin-ryū Karate in Atlanta, Georgia, in 1961, and then, in Gainesville, Florida, from 1966 to 1969. He remained independent of the Association. In 1960, the Okinawan-American Karate Association was formed, with Harold Mitchum as the association's first president. The name of the association was changed to the American-Okinawan Karate Association due to an error at the print shop.

Shimabuku made only two trips to the United States to visit his many military students. The first, was to Pittsburgh, Pennsylvania, in 1964 from September to late November, sponsored by James Morabeto and William Duessel. He also briefly visited Toronto, Canada to attend the tournament of Masami Tsuroka. During his second trip, in late 1966, he visited Steve Armstrong in Tacoma, Washington, Harold Long in Knoxville, Tennessee, Donald Nagle in Jersey City, New Jersey, and Harry Acklin in Cleveland, Ohio. Armstrong, Long, and Nagle were promoted to the rank of Hachi-Dan (8th Degree) during this visit, and each of these men became a driving force in the promotion and spread of Isshin-ryū karate in the United States thereafter. Shimabuku was known to not enjoy traveling far from home. Any further visits representing him were conducted by his student and son-in-law, Angi Uezu (1935-2024), beginning in 1967.

Another important event took place during this trip. While visiting the dojo of Steve Armstrong, in November 1966, Shimabuku was filmed performing all 14 Isshin-ryu kata as well as some basic exercise and self-defense techniques. Copies of this film were circulated among the top instructors. It is believed by some that Shimabuku did not want to be filmed, and that the recording does not represent a true expression of the various kata. Nevertheless, it is clear from Armstrong's writings that it was his intention to have the film be the standard for the system.

Shimabuku continued teaching at his dojo in Agena until his retirement in early 1972. He passed his legacy to his son, Kichiro Shimabukuro (b. 1939); Eiko Kaneshi was originally considered for this honor.

== Death ==
Shimabuku died from a stroke at his home in the village of Agena on May 30, 1975, at the age of 66.

== Modifications from traditional forms ==
Some of his modifications to karate are:

- The Sunsu kata: a kata exclusive to Isshin-ryu, Sunsu consists mostly of techniques from other kata that Tatsuo found useful and important.
- Reversing the Naihanchi kata, going left first, rather than right. NOTE: The Tomari Naihanchi starts in this fashion so Tatsuo did not change this.

== Legacy ==
In 1980, Shimabuku was the first person inducted into the International Isshin-ryu Karate Association's Isshin-ryū Hall of Fame.
