= Tatsuo Yamada (karate) =

Japanese karateka (1905–1967)

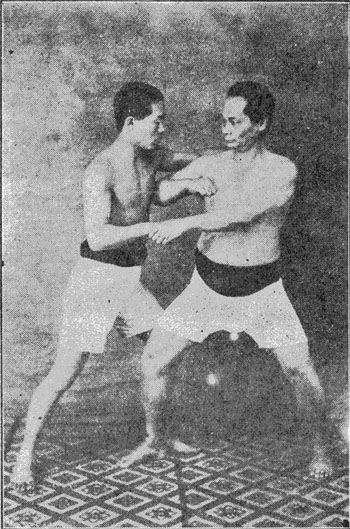
- Yamada Tatsuo (left) and Motobu Chōki (1926)
- Born: 16 October 1905; Hyōgo Prefecture, Japan
- Died: May 28, 1967 (aged 61)
- Style: Karate
- Teacher: Motobu Choki

Tatsuo Yamada (山田辰雄, Yamada Tatsuo; 1905 - May 28, 1967) was a Japanese karateka from Hyōgo Prefecture.

Yamada was one of the karateka representing the Shōwa period, the founder of the Japanese Kenpo Karate-do. He was one of the first karateka to wearing sparring gloves in Japan, a development that contributed to full contact karate and kickboxing in later years.

== Bibliography ==
- 小沼保『本部朝基正伝 琉球拳法空手術達人(増補 )』壮神社 2000年 ISBN 4915906426
- 巨椋修『実戦！ケンカ空手家列伝』福昌堂 1996年 ISBN 4892246115
- 金城裕編『月刊空手道』（合本復刻版）榕樹書林 1997年 ISBN 4947667400
