= Kentsū Yabu =

Okinawan karateka

Kentsū Yabu 屋部 憲通
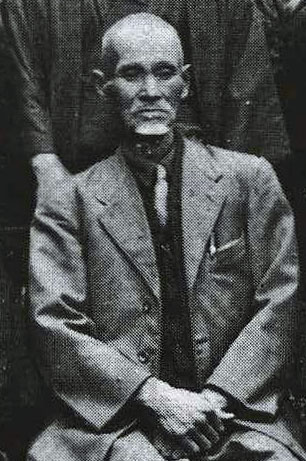
- Yabu Kentsu, c. 1936
- Born: September 23, 1866; Shuri, Okinawa, Ryukyu Kingdom
- Died: August 27, 1937 (age 70); Shuri, Okinawa, Japan
- Style: Shuri-te, Tomari-te
- Teachers: Matsumura Sōkon, Ankō Itosu, Kōsaku Matsumora

Other information
- Notable students: Yabiku Mōtoku, Kanken Toyama, Tokuda Anbun, Kyoda Jūhatsu, Gima Shinkin, many others

Kentsū Yabu (屋部 憲通, Yabu Kentsū; September 23, 1866 - August 27, 1937) was a karate master in Okinawa, and was among the first people to demonstrate karate in Hawaii.

Yabu learned Shuri-te from Matsumura Sōkon and Ankō Itosu and Tomari-te from Kōsaku Matsumora. He is often considered Itosu's top student.

== History ==
Yabu Kentsū was born in Shuri, Okinawa, on September 23, 1866. He was the oldest son of Yabu Kenten and Shun Morinaga. He had three brothers, three sisters, and three half-sisters. On March 19, 1886, he married Takahara Oto (1868-1940).

As a young man, Yabu learned Shuri-te from Matsumura Sōkon and Ankō Itosu. Around 1889, he, together with Motobu Chōyū and Motobu Chōki, learned Tomari-te from Kōsaku Matsumora. In those days, there was no distinction between different styles of karate, and Yabu did not call himself by the name of his school for the rest of his life.

Yabu joined the Japanese Army in December 1890. He served in the First Sino-Japanese War of 1894-1895. He received promotion to lieutenant, but to subsequent students, he was often known as gunso, or sergeant.

Following separation from the service, Yabu became a teacher at Okinawa Prefectural Normal School in 1906.

In 1908, Yabu's oldest son, Kenden, emigrated to Hawaii. In 1912, Kenden moved to California. In the USA, Yabu Kenden became known as Kenden Yabe, after a method of transliteration then being used on Japanese passports.

In 1919, Kenden Yabe married, and in 1921, his wife became pregnant. Yabu Kentsū went to California in 1919 to visit his son (and, hopefully, grandson). However, Kenden Yabe and his wife only had daughters.

Yabu stayed in the United States from 1919 until 1927. He returned to Okinawa via Hawaii. He spent about nine months in the Territory. He spent most of his time on Oahu, but he also visited other islands. In Honolulu, he gave two public demonstrations of karate at the Nu'uanu YMCA.

Yabu died at Shuri, Okinawa, on August 27, 1937.

== Influence on Karate ==
As a former soldier, Yabu has been credited with helping make Okinawan karate training more militaristic. That is, students were expected to line up in rows, and respond by the numbers. If so, this was probably part of the general militarization of Japanese athletics common during the early 20th century. However, there is no doubt that his methods involved much rote repetition.

His favorite kata reportedly included Gojūshiho and Naihanchi.
