= Sannosuke Ueshima =

Japanese karateka

Kiyotada Sannosuke Ueshima
- Historical photo of Sannosuke Ueshima
- Born: 1893; Akō, Hyōgo, Japan
- Died: 1987 (aged 93–94); Osaka, Japan
- Other names: Kiyotada Sanosuke Ueshima
- Style: Kodokan Judo, Kushin-ryu
- Teacher(s): Sugaya Ueshima, Kiyotada Kahei Matsubara, Kanamori Kinjo/Kinsei Kinjo
- Rank: 8th Dan

Kiyotada Sannosuke Ueshima (上島 三之助 清忠, Ueshima Sannosuke Kiyotada, 1893–1987) was a Japanese martial arts master who developed and founded the Kushin-ryu style of karate in Osaka, Japan.

== Karate-do ==
When he was three years old, he began studying Konshin-ryu Juhojutsu (Jujutsu) at Kiyotada Kahei Matsubara's academy in Akō, Hyōgo. When he was nine years old, he started the study of the karate katas Channan and Kūshankū from Sugaya Ueshima, an Akō police officer who was originally from Okinawa.

== Konshin-ryu Juho-jutsu ==
In 1918, at the age of 25, Ueshima received the title of professor of Konshin-ryu juho-jutsu (Konshin-ryu jujutsu) from Matsubara and Guikyo Mazai Akada. After receiving his title, Ueshima moved to Osaka, where he opened the Konshin-ryu Juhojutsu (Konshin-ryu jujutsu) Academy. Several Okinawan karate teachers practiced and taught karate there. These included:

- Chōki Motobu who taught the Shuri-te and Tomari-te style.
- Kanamori "Kinsei" Kinjo who taught the styles Shōrin-ryū and Gōjū-ryū.
- Chōshin Chibana who founder and taught the Shōrin-ryū Kobayashi style.

== Founder of Kushin-ryu ==
Kanamori Kinjo/Kinsei Kinjo, who taught Shōrin-ryū and Gōjū-ryū to Ueshima. In 1932, Ueshima founded the Kushin-ryu karate-do style, developed from Konshin-ryu and Gōjū-ryū karate. In 1933, the Dai Nippon Butoku Kai conferred the title of professor (kyoshi) of judo to Ueshima. In 1935, and for the first time in Japan, the Dai Nippon Butoku Kai conferred the title of kyoshi to Ueshima, Chōjun Miyagi (founder of the Gōjū-ryū style), and Yasuhiro Konishi (founder of the Shindo Shizen/Jinen style).

In 1940, the Dai Nippon Butoku Kai conferred the title of renshi to Kinjo. In 1946, after the end of World War II, the Dai Nippon Butoku Kai was dissolved. In 1965, Ueshima received the title of 8th dan in Kodokan Judo. Kinjo returned to his native Okinawa, where he spread Kushin-ryu.
