= Kōsaku Matsumora =

Okinawan karateka

Kosaku Matsumora
- Born: 1829; Ryūkyū Kingdom
- Died: 1898 (aged 68–69); Okinawa, Japan
- Style: Matsumora-type Tomari-te
- Teacher(s): Karyu Uku, Kishin Teruya

Other information
- Notable students: Choki Motobu, Chotoku Kyan

Kosaku Matsumora (松茂良 興作, Matsumora Kōsaku, 1829 - 1898) was a Ryūkyūan karate master. He studied Tomari-te under Karyu Uku (aka Giko Uku) and Kishin Teruya. He also studied Jigen-ryu. Among Matsumora's students, who went on to influence new generations through students of their own, were Choki Motobu and Chotoku Kyan.

== Teaching Kyan ==
Matsumora is credited as the master who taught Chotoku Kyan the kata Chinto (his own version, not to be confused with Sokon Matsumura's version of the same kata). Another student of Matsumora, Maeda Pechin, is credited with teaching Kyan the kata Wanshu.

== Fame ==
Kosaku Matsumora became famous at the age of 20 when he stole a sword out of the hands of an angry Satsuma overlord using only a "wet towel" as a weapon. Matsumora quickly revealed the moist Japanese towel which he had recently developed a habit of carrying concealed inside his garment. Matsumora hit the astonished samurai with the wet towel and grabbed the sword. In the process, Matsumora lost a thumb. He threw the thumb and the sword in the nearby Asato River. The official story comes from Shōshin Nagamine. This event was so insulting to the Japanese overlords that Matsumora became an Okinawan folk hero overnight.

== Additional information ==
- Akari-ki Karate: Kasaku Matsumora

== See also ==
- Pechin/Peichin
