= Isshin-ryū =

Style of karate

Isshin-Ryu
- The kanji for Isshin-Ryū Karate-Do
- Country of origin: Okinawa Prefecture, Japan
- Creator: Shimabuku Tatsuo
- Parenthood: Shorin-ryū, Gojū-ryū, Kobudō

Isshin-Ryū (一心流, Isshin-ryū) is a style of Okinawan karate created by Tatsuo Shimabuku (島袋 龍夫) in approximately 1947/1948 (and named its present name on January 15, 1956). Isshin-Ryū karate is largely a synthesis of Shorin-ryū karate, Gojū-ryū karate, and kobudō. The name means, literally, "one heart method" (as in "wholehearted" or "complete"). In 1989 there were 336 branches of Isshin-ryū throughout the world (as recorded by the IWKA), most of which were concentrated in the United States.

== Kata ==
The system is summarized in its kata, and the specific techniques used to punch (vertical fist) and kick (snapping kicks) presented as upper and lower 'charts', most of which are thrown from natural stances and body posture. In many of the various forms of the system, sixteen kata (eight empty-hand, three bo, two sai, a bo-bo kumite kata, a bo-sai kumite kata and one tuifa kata) are agreed upon as composing Isshin-ryu. These kata include original developments of the Master, and inherited kata from the parent styles.

=== Empty-hand kata ===
==== Seisan (十三) ====
Tatsuo Shimabuku learned Seisan from his primary instructor, Chotoku Kyan. Previous to Kyan's instruction, the Seisan form was a staple of local traditions.

This kata is sometimes the first introduced to students after the First and Second Charts of basics have been learned. This is in contrast to other Shorin systems where this kata is learned after other fundamental kata.

The Gojū-ryū curriculum includes a related version of Seisan, but Isshin-ryū Seisan was learned from Kyan, not Miyagi.

==== Seiunchin (随運勁) ====
The Seiunchin kata was brought into Isshin-ryū from Shimabuku's studies with the Gojū-ryū founder, Chojun Miyagi. It is theorized by some Isshin-ryu researchers that this kata is an original composed by Miyagi, based on his experiences in Fuzhou, China. However, since this kata was also taught by Miyagi's teacher, Kanryo Higaonna (1853-1915), and is included in other naha-te descended styles such as Shito-ryu, it is more likely that it was Higaonna who brought the kata back to Okinawa after his earlier studies in Fuzhou.

The kata focuses on the stance "shiko-dachi" (sometimes referred to as "seiunchin-dachi"), a low horse stance at which the knees are bent at obtuse angles and the feet are angled away from the direction the body is facing at 45-degree angles. The kata is broken into segments, each utilizing a specific breathing and muscle-tensing method. The kata has no obvious kicks, but one section contains hints of a rising knee strike.

==== Naihanchi (逮坡戦) ====
Naihanchi [Shodan] comes to Isshin Ryu from studies with both Chotoku Kyan and Choki Motobu (a cousin of Kyan). It is also considered one of the staples of Ryukyu Ti, and is prevalent in most forms of Karate. The Isshin Ryu version is influenced heavily by the kumite of Motobu, with the exception of the turned-in toes (Motobu preferred the horse-riding stance with the toes in a neutral position).

The kata is also noted for its use of the "Nami ashi", the returning wave kick. The kick has many different potentials for application, including the sweeping or redirecting of a low kick, a kick or knee to the inside of an opponent's thigh, knee, tibia, and ankle. It also has the movement training potential for the basics of the sequential summation of movement. Some interpret the move as a low "yoko-geri" (side kick) from naihanchi-dachi to the opponent's farthest ankle, inside-calf, or knee, and returning the kick to the body around the opponent's nearest leg across one's body to the hip and back down to naihanchi-stance.

A popular interpretation of the kata concerns its position: the entire sequence of moves in the kata is to be executed as if one is standing up against a wall and one's opponents are to his left, right, and straight ahead. It is because of this that the kata is usually taught with the back straight and the heels and back placed firmly either on a straight edge such as a board or a wall, or on top of a long piece of tape.

The main stance of naihanchi is a slight variant from the Isshin Ryu stance "kiba-dachi", in which both feet are shoulder-width apart facing forward. "Naihanchi-dachi," as it's called, takes kiba-dachi and turns the balls of the feet (area of foot just behind the toes) and turns them inward and accentuates the continuous bend at the knees Isshin Ryu Karateka are taught from initiation.

==== Wansū (汪 楫) ====
Also coming from Kyan, Wanshū (also known as Wansu) has several iterations on the island of Ryukyu. Popular history has the kata coming from a Chinese political visitor who, during his duties, taught his fighting method in the open.

Isshin Ryu's version of this form is unique for its inclusion of two side kicks - techniques seen in the system previously only in the Chart Two exercises. Current research hints at this change being made by Shimabuku Tatsuo himself.

For technical content, the form tends to focus on the slipping and in-close evasion and redirection of attack. It also contains a unique movement often described as a fireman's carry throw, or dump. Because of this, many schools during the 1960s and 1970s nicknamed this kata "the dumping form". Also, depending on the lineage, Wansu is one of two kata in Isshin Ryu which use the "zenkutsu dachi", the longer front stance seen in other forms of karate.

==== Chinto (鎮闘) ====
As with most of the kata in Isshin Ryu, Chinto comes from the teaching of Kyan.

The kata differs from others in that its embusen is a line placed on a 45-degree angle from the starting position, in the Kyan-style tradition. The footwork is indicative of a slipping, deflecting, and a whipping, relaxed body motion. Some karate instructors consider the previously learned forms of the system, Naihanchi and Wansu, to be preparatory and basic training forms, culminating in the kata Chinto.

==== Kusanku (公相君) ====
Of the eight weaponless kata in Isshin-Ryu, five come from the teaching of Chotoku Kyan. Kusanku is one of these.

Kusanku is often referred to as a "night-fighting" kata, or a form which teaches fighting at night. The kata is set up in such a manner as to allow continual study of application potential from basic standing grappling and close striking in the beginning, to more aggressive and proactive techniques near the end. Its techniques may be utilized in places with low levels of light but is not exclusively a night fighting form.

Depending on the lineage, Kusanku is the second of two kata which contain the zenkutsu-dachi in Isshin-Ryu.

==== Sunsu (翁の父) ====
This kata was designed by the founder of Isshin-Ryu, Shimabuku Tatsuo, in approximately 1947. It incorporates several movements from other kata in the Isshin-Ryu syllabus, as well as from kata from other instructors, in addition to techniques and concepts Shimabuku favored. It was used as a dojo kata and as a personal project of the founder, prior to the naming of Isshin Ryu in 1956. Sunsu is rarely found outside of Isshin Ryu dojo.

The Okinawa Prefecture Karate Kobudo Rengokai has recognized Sunsu as a kata of Okinawa. This represents an acceptance of Isshin-Ryu as a traditional Ryukyu martial art.

==== Sanchin (三戦) ====
Coming from Miyagi Chojun, Sanchin has its origins in the Gojū-ryū system. Along with Seiunchin, this is one of two Gojū-ryū katas in Isshin-ryū. Previous to the instruction of Miyagi, the kata was practiced with open hands, turns, and natural breathing methods. With the founding of Gojū-ryū, this form was practiced with closed fists (a more traditional method on Okinawa), no turns, and a controlled, almost hard inhalation and exhalation.

Touted primarily for its physical training aspects, Sanchin also contains many applicable martial techniques.

Shimabuku also thought very highly of the form, saying once, "Sanchin is for health. Without health, how can one have karate?"

=== Bō Kata ===
==== Tukunmi nu Kun (Jp. Tokumine no Kon) ====
This bō form comes to the Isshin Ryu system from Shimabuku's time with Chōtoku Kyan. Kyan is to have learned the form either from Tokumine himself, or from Tokumine's landlord after the aforementioned had passed on. Shimabuku Tatsuo also commented that this was his favorite kata.

==== Urashi nu Kun (Jp. Urasoe no Kon) ====
The form Urashi no Kun was taught to Shimabuku by his kobudō instructor, Shinken Taira. Taira is the founder of the Ryūkyū Kobudō Hozon Shinkokai, whose goal is the preservation of Okinawa's weapons forms.

==== Shishi nu Kun (Jp. Sueyoshi no Kon) ====
Shimabuku learned this form from Shinken Taira who learned it from Kenwa Mabuni.

The kata itself uses the bo in a horizontal manner, different from other cudgel traditions.

=== Sai Kata ===
==== Kusanku Sai ====
This form is a product of Shimabuku's own research into the art of kobudō, the coverall for Okinawa's weapons studies.

The kata was built as an introduction to Sai practice, with the weapon movements replacing the empty-hand applications.

The form is taught one of two ways: with or without kicks. Initially, the kata was taught with kicks as it is a karate-based kata. Later, after 1960, the kicks were removed because Shimabuku wished to emphasize the weapon more so.

==== Chatan Yara nu Sai (Jp. Kitatani Yara no Sai) ====
Chatan Yara is taught as the second Sai kata in the Isshin Ryu system, coming from Shimabuku's instruction with Shinken Taira.

The form focuses on the development of the "sequential summation of movement", which is the scientific term for full-body whipping motion. This is exemplified by the emphasis on whipping strikes, which make up a vast majority of the offensive movements in the form.

==== Chan nu Sai (Jp. Kyan no Sai) ====
This form comes either from Shimabuku's studies of Sai methodology with Kyan, his primary karate instructor, or was possibly a form taught in its entirety. Shimabuku was teaching this kata in 1951 but by 1959 he had dropped in favor of Kusanku.

=== Tonfa Kata ===
==== Hamafija nu Tuifa (Jp. Hamahiga no Tonfa) ====
This form is from Shimabuku's studies with Shinken Taira. It is the only Tonfa kata in the Isshinryu system. As do many Okinawans, Shimabuku always referred to the weapon, and thus the kata also, as tuifa.

Some Isshin-Ryu schools teach the kata in a different order.

== Other curriculum ==
=== Upper body basics ===
Developed by Tatsuo Shimabuku and one of his Okinawan students Eiko Kaneshi, the first chart (though some first-generation students learned this chart after the lower-body chart) of basic techniques is unique to the Isshin Ryu system.

Though the technical content and number of techniques varies by lineage, the first Chart One was simply a collection of 15 upper-body dominant techniques Shimabuku felt were necessary for proper development.

=== Lower body basics ===
Developed at the same time as the first chart, the second set of techniques are, largely, the basic kicking techniques of the Isshin Ryu system. As with the first chart, the number of techniques, as well as actual technical content, vary by lineage. The initial chart contained eight kicking techniques and six stretching and calisthenic exercises. A ninth kick was informally added to the chart in the late 1960s.

=== Kote-kitai ===
Kote-kitai is the Okinawan term for arm conditioning. Karada-kitai is the term for body conditioning with ashi-kitai for the feet, fukubu-kitai for the stomach, etc. It is not unique to Isshin Ryu, and is also used by other Okinawan styles such as Uechi-ryu.

=== Makiwara (巻藁) ===
As with the Kotekitai, the makiwara is a rather universal tool in Okinawan martial arts. It is made from an immovable punching post constructed of wood or some firm material, wrapped in straw or other soft padding.

The Makiwara is used primarily in the development of the striking surfaces utilized in karate. Unlike a hanging bag, timing, cadence, and footwork are rarely utilized with this implement, instead using it almost solely as a resistance training aide.

Striking of the makiwara tends to develop the muscles around the joints, strengthening them for the sometimes awkward or unorthodox strikes found in the various types of Ryukyu martial arts. The most common strikes used are straight punches using various hand formations and single, two, and three finger strikes.

=== Kumite (組手) ===
Kumite is the practice of free-sparring, that is, sparring in a non-set pattern. Shimabuku was one of the first, if not the first, Okinawan instructors to institute free-sparring using full Kendo armor to allow for full-contact training while minimizing the risk of injury. Current equipment makes free-sparring much easier and safer, allow for a more involved and effective karate training method.

Shimabuku also taught a series of 45 self-defense techniques, some devised from movements from the Isshin-ryu kata, some derived from kata that he did not include in the Isshin-ryu curriculum (presumably Gojushiho, Passai, and Ananku), and some derived from techniques that Shimabuku favored. Collectively, these techniques were listed in the dojo simply as Kumite, but some Isshin-ryu groups call them Shimabuku Tatsuo no Kumite (島袋龍夫の組手).

== History ==
Shimabuku Tatsuo (島袋龍夫) (1908–1975) was born Shinkichi Shimabuku on September 19, 1908, in Gushikawa village, Okinawa. While "the four most widely recognized of Tatsuo Shimabuku's instructors are Chotoku Kyan, Choki Motobu, Chojun Miyagi, and Taira Shinken", his training history remains controversial, with one review finding his karate career "riddled with historical inaccuracies, flaws, and unlikely scenarios". This review itself has been challenged by Andy Sloane, who claims to be a primary source for the article.

Shimabuku began training under Shinko Ganeko (Okinawan: Ganiku), his maternal uncle. Ganeko later sent Shimabuku to study karate from Chotoku Kyan. Kyan served as Shimabuku's principal instructor and seems to have been the most influential of Shimabuku's teachers in shaping the Isshin-ryu style. The Classical Fighting Arts article questions this, noting that Eizo Shimabuku claimed that he and his brother Tatsuo were his students when they were young, then rhetorically asks why Eizo subsequently sent a senior student from their Isshin ryu dojo to learn Kyan's distinctive forms. Nevertheless, the Shuri-Style Lineage Chart of the Okinawa Prefecture Board of Education lists Kyan as Shimabuku's teacher. As Donnelly, author of several books on Isshin-ryu karate, suggests in reference to this chart, "This is an indication that the Okinawan Kobudo Association only recognizes his [Shimabuku's] Shorin-Ryu lineage and doesn't feel that his time in Goju-Ryu is adequate to maintain that lineage. ... This is not to suggest that Master Shimabuku didn't study Goju-Ryu, but that his study was not of a significant amount of time to be listed under that system." Chotoku Kyan would be his most influential instructor (and after whom he initially named his style Chan Mi Te, with Migwa being a reference to Chotoku Kyan's nickname stemming from his wearing of glasses and his small eyes).

Bishop claimed he studied under Choki Motobu during the early 1940s in Naha. However, since Shimabuku was only present in Okinawa between 1941–42 and Motobu died in 1944, the "Classical Fighting Arts" article deems it "difficult to understand" how he could have trained with Motobu "in any meaningful way." Bishop further cites Shimabuku having studied for various lengths of time with Chojun Miyagi, Choki Motobu, and Taira Shinken. The "Classical Fighting Arts" article claims that local sources list Shimabuku training for two months with Chojun Miyagi.

Shimabuku opened his first dojo in Konbu village and began teaching in late 1946 after being repatriated from Kyushu. Around this time, he adopted the name Tatsuo, or Dragon Man. He taught in Tairagawa village and also in Koza City before deciding to teach in his house in about 1948. On January 15, 1956, he held a meeting and announced that he was naming his new style of karate Isshin-ryu. Shimabuku's number one student, Eiko Kaneshi, was at the meeting and asked Shimabuku, "Why such a funny name?" Tatsuo replied, "Because all things begin with one."

At the age of 50 (c. 1959) Shimabuku began studying kobudō, the art of traditional Okinawan weapons, under Shinken Taira. Kobudō weapons included were the sai, bo, and tonfa. He incorporated the kobudō that he had learned from Kyan and Taira into the Isshin-ryu system.

Tatsuo Shimabukuro retired in 1972. His eldest son, Kichiro Shimabuku (b. 1939), took over administration of the dojo, and inherited leadership of the style upon his father's death in 1975. Shortly before his father's death, he moved the dojo back to Kyan Village (present-day Uruma) and renamed the organization the Isshin-Ryu World Karate Association.

== Symbol ==
Isshinryu No Megami ("Goddess of Isshinryu"),

Isshinryu No Megami (一心流の女神), or for short, Megami (女神; goddess) is the symbol of Isshin-ryu. It is represented on the Isshin-ryu crest and is often displayed on the front wall of the dojo next to a picture of Tatsuo Shimabuku. As an emblem for Isshin-ryū Tatsuo Shimabuku chose a half-sea-snake half-woman deity whom he had seen in a vision. She represents the strength of the snake and the quiet character of a woman, thus expressing the essence of the style.

== Features ==
Isshin-Ryu employs a vertical punch with the fingers tucked in and the thumb on top of the fist. Advantages vary with opinion, but it is usually taught that the thumb placement increases the stability of the wrist when punching, and that a vertical punch strikes with the same force at any range instead of at maximum extension as with a corkscrew style punch. Another advantage is that when punching, the thumb will not get caught on an object as opposed to having the thumb sticking up or out.

In Isshin-Ryu it is believed that the vertical punch is faster than the cork-screw punch: three vertical hand punches can be generated in the time of two cork-screw punches.

Isshin-Ryu arm blocks are performed today with the muscle at the intended contact point as opposed to other styles that block with the bone. By using the two bones and the muscle to form a block, less stress is created against the defender's arm, increasing the ability to absorb a strike.

Beginners in Isshin-ryu are taught to use their forearms to block in order to strengthen their forearms while working toward becoming a black belt. An alternate application could be use the knuckles of the fist on the inside of an attacker's arm where are the soft tissue is emphasizing a hard strike to soft tissue. Therefore, there really are no blocks in Isshin-ryu.

Many of Isshin-ryu's kicks are delivered with a "snapping" motion, though a couple of them are delivered in a thrusting manner. Furthermore, traditional Isshin-ryu kicks are aimed almost entirely to the legs or groin—rarely rising above the belt. Competition kicks are aimed above the belt; however, these are largely meant to show one's flexibility and balance and not intended for practical use.
