= Kenkojuku =

Style of Shotokan karate

- Also known as: "kenko"
- Date founded: 1942
- Country of origin: Japan
- Founder: Tomosaburo Okano (1922-2003)
- Arts taught: Karate
- Ancestor arts: Okinawan Martial Arts, karate, kendo, kobudo, Iaido
- Ancestor schools: Shōtōkai, Shōrin-ryū, Chito Ryu, Goju Ryu
- Practitioners: Tomokatsu Okano, Takashi Asukawa, Toyotaro Miyazaki, Koji Sugimoto, Masakazu Takahashi, James Bowden, John Egan, Andrew Faupel
- Official website: http://karate-do.main.jp/

Kenkojuku is a style of Shotokan karate previous to the establishment of the Japan Karate Association (JKA) style. It was founded by Tomosaburo Okano. Kenkojuku karate is similar to the teachings of Gichin Funakoshi and modifications made by Funakoshi's son Yoshitaka Funakoshi. JKA Shotokan differs slightly in that it was Masatoshi Nakayama's version of Shotokan. Okano's/Yoshitaka's Kenkojuku karate and JKA karate are becoming more similar compared to other variants of Shotokan karate such as Shigeru Egami's Shotokai, Hirokazu Kanazawa's Shotokan Karate International or SKI.

== General description ==
Since the style is more biomechanically sound and self-defense oriented, there are notable differences in the way many techniques are performed; by comparison with JKA Shotokan karate. For example: The rising block or age uke is performed by aligning the ulna bone in the forearm with the arm, and not by twisting the ulna as in the usual jodan uke. There is a wider arc made at the startup position for the soto uke, the gedan barai is more a check than a full-power block. The double-hand blocks have various "hands together" start-up positions. The Shotokan Kenkojuku style originally had lower, more demanding kokutsu dachi and neko ashi dachi stances, and a more vertical shuto uke/shuto uchi (also known as seiryuto uke/uchi). The mawashi geri, or round kick, is performed at a slight downward angle. Within the style's katas, these show better relationship/linkage patterns between the various movements between basic, intermediate and advanced katas. The kata Niseishi (Chito Ryu version) is included in the Dan grade syllabus instead of Nijūshiho, as well as other katas from other styles such as Goju Ryu. In the kata Bassai, the yama tsuki is performed in a shorter arc. Additionally, the style's free-fighting position is similar to a crouching lunge position, holding both fists in a vertical forward position, protecting the body's center line as if holding a sword. The style's kumite is more focused on continuous fighting and combinations, as in boxing, rather than the usual stop-and-start point fighting, or WKF sport kumite.

Kenkojuku karate also includes both traditional Okinawan (bō, tonfa, sai, nunchaku) and Japanese weapons training, also known as kobudo. The style also includes training in the martial art of drawing the Japanese sword (Iaido) within its syllabus; since Okano was also a 7th Dan of Iaido, from the Japan Kendo Federation.

Kenkojuku comes under the jurisdiction of the Kenkojuku Karate Association, which was founded by Tomosaburo Okano, a student of Gichin Funakoshi, and an early proponent of Shotokan karate. The association's motto is "Inner Strength with Outward Humility." Since Okano's death, the Kenkojuku Budokan is run by his son Tomokatsu Okano, from the headquarters dojo located in Tokyo.

Okano was also a noted expert in the field of Japanese flower arrangement (Ikebana) specifically roses which became a passion of his, in later years.

== Notable Instructors ==
=== Tomosaburo Okano ===
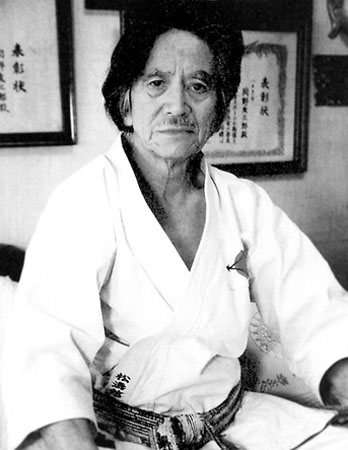
Tomosaburo Okano shotokan kenkojuku karate founder

The founder and chief instructor of the Kenkojuku Shotokan Federation was Tomosaburo Okano. Born in 1922, he was a student of Gichin Funakoshi. He was a member of Funakoshi's karate association the Dai Nihon Karate-do Shotokai.

In 1942, Okano was given permission to start a karate research club named Kenkokai Karate-bu in his hometown of Hachiōji, Tokyo. The club was started with the help of Suzuki Shinjo, Kaneko Isamu and Takagi Yoshitomo. He renamed the dojo Kenkojuku Budokan in 1948.

Okano's karate was influenced by both Gichin and Gigo Funakoshi, and eventually this branch of Shotokan became known as Kenkojuku Shotokan. He retained the Shotokai lineage as well as the name Shotokan.

Okano was on the panel of Masters of the Japan Karate-do Federation (JKF), being an 8th Dan in karate. and was also a 7th Dan of Iaido, from the Japan Kendo Federation. He died on July 19, 2003, at the age of 81.

Some of his most famous students were/are Takashi Akuzawa, Toyotaro Miyazaki, Kazuo Kuriyama, Masakazu Takahashi, Koji Sugimoto, Minoru Horie, Wayne Wickizer, John Slocum, Larry Durst, Ted Ratich, Bernard Pierce, Fred Hamilton, Stuart Hirschfield, Joseph Butrim and Armando Comacho.

=== Toyotaro Miyazaki ===
Toyotaro Miyazaki was born in Tokyo, Japan and began his karate training at the age of 15 under Tomasaburo Okano at the Kenkojuku dojo. He trained in Shotokan Karate until his mid twenties before going to the United States. He achieved fame as a competitor in both kata and kumite. His skills put him on the covers of Black Belt magazine, Karate Illustrated and Official Karate. In Flushing, New York Miyazaki taught over 30 years thousands of students and has produced hundreds of black belts, some of whom have become instructors at their own karate dojos.

Miyazaki was a former instructor of the Long Island University Karate Instructor's Certification program. He is currently Head of the International Shotokai Federation. He retired from teaching and closed the Tokutai dojo in 2004 due to illness. In 2010 and early 2011 he could be found visiting the daytime classes at the Shotojuku dojo in Astoria, Queens. In mid-2011 he decided to return to teaching. His dojo is now called Shotokai USA and is located in Bayside, Queens, NYC. In 2016 Mr. Miyazaki retired again and returned to Japan, where he resided. He died in August 2021.

=== Takashi Akusawa ===
Takashi Asukawa Shihan was sent to the United States in 1961, from Japan through the sponsorship of James Arwood to the city of Memphis, Tennessee to teach and promote karate kenkojuku. With the help of Mr. Arwood, He ran a dojo in the city of Jackson, Mississippi Eventually Akusawa Sensei left Mr. Arwood and established his own Dojo in Miami, Florida. The Samurai Dojo in Coral Gables, unfortunately due to a severe illness. He was forced to return to Japan.

=== Masakazu Takahashi ===
Masakazu Takahashi

Takahashi has 8th dan and is head of the United States Kenkojuku Karate Association. Takahashi began his karate training in 1961 under Tomosaburo Okano. In 1971, he traveled to America to teach Kenkojuku karate. Originally teaching in Queens, he has two dojos located in Mt. Kisco and Amityville, New York that have been established for more than 41 years.

=== Koji Sugimoto ===
Koji Sugimoto was born in Tokyo, Japan in 1947. At the age of fourteen he began karate under Tomosaburo Okano, a student of Gichin Funakoshi.

In 1970, Sugimoto emigrated to Florida. In Miami, he joined with Akuzawa and assisted at his dojo. In the early seventies, he began teaching in Dade County. In the late seventies he began to sponsor tournaments. In 1978 he invited Okano to a tournament at Palmetto High School. Okano's demonstrations served as great learning experiences for Sugimoto's students. In the early eighties Okano visited again and held several demonstrations, including kenjutsu (sword).

During the eighties, Sugimoto ran AAU Karate tournaments in the State of Florida. He sponsored annual Kenkojuku tournaments which were held at FIU (Florida International University).

In the early nineties, he received 6th Dan from the All Japan Karate-do Federation (JKF) and received the title shihan. Sugimoto also holds 7th Dan in the World Karate Federation (WKF).

Sugimoto has spread Kenkojuku Shotokan style of karate to the United States, Europe, South America, Central America and the Caribbean. Sugimoto has had close relationships and given certifications to several Shotokan kenkojuku Dojos in Latin America. Presently Sugimoto teaches in South Dade County and at the Miami Dade College Kendall campus.
