= Karate techniques =

Karate technique

A number of karate techniques are used to deliver strikes to the human body. These techniques are delivered from a number of stances. The karateka uses a number of blocks to protect themselves against these strikes.

== Vital points ==
Vital points used in attack
Japanese	English
Hichu	This pressure point is located in the center of the lowest part of the neck, in the hollow.
Shofu	In the lateral aspect of the neck, in the posterior border of the Sternocleidomastoideus posterosuperior on both sides of the center of the neck.
Tento	Half an inch directly above the middle of the anterior hairline.
Dokko	Dokko is a hollow spot behind the ear lobe
Uto	Half an inch above the eye bridge, between the eyes.
Jinchu	A little above midpoint of the philtrum, just under the nostrils.
Mikazuki	Above the Adam’s apple, in the depression of the upper border of the hyoid bone.
Kote	On the inner crease of the elbow (find the center of the crease, and move inward toward the body one half cun.)
Yun Chuan	On the sole of the foot just forward of center.
Yako	Four cun (inches) above the medial epicedial of the femur, between m. vastus medialis and m. Sartorius. One inch below the center of the inner thigh.
Bitei	The coccyx, targeted inwards or upwards or a combination of the two angles.
Kinteki	The midpoint of the upper border of the Superior pubic ligament
Teko	On the dorsum of the hand, between the thumb and the 1st metacarpal bones, dors. Inter osseous m.,1st
Myojyo	Classic martial arts on inch below the belly button. Acupuncture places it at 1.5 cun from navel.
Sonu	The general location of this area is stomach and large intestine
Tendo	Found at the top of the skull, 2 cun (inch) posterior to the midpoint of the anterior hairline.
Kasumi	Sphenoid or temple, in the depression about one inch posterior to the midpoint between the lateral eyebrow and the outer canthus.
Mimi	Whole of the ear
Seidon	Yuyao, middle of the eyebrow with the eye looking forward, the point is under the pupil, between the eyeball and the infraorbital ridge.
Genkon	In the depression in the center of the Mentolabial groove.
Keichu	Center of the back of the neck, between the third and fourth Cervical vertebrae.
Muyo bone	Inside edge of the tibia, seven cun above the tip of the medial malleolus, on the medial aspect near the medial border of the tibia.
Fukuto	Fukuto is located on the midline of the lateral aspect of the thigh, about seven cun above the transverse popliteal crease.
Uchi Kuro Bushi	In the depression of the lower border of the medial malleolus or one cun (inch) below the medial malleolus. Just below and slightly to the front of the knobby protruding of bone on the in side of the ankle of the right leg.
Koori	Gap between the first and second toe on the foot surface of the web.
Gaishoho	One half inch above, on the Pericardium meridian, on the palm side of the arm about two and a half inches above the wrist, between the Radius and the ulna bones.
Shen Men	Outside of the back of the foot, behind outer ankle.

== Arm techniques ==
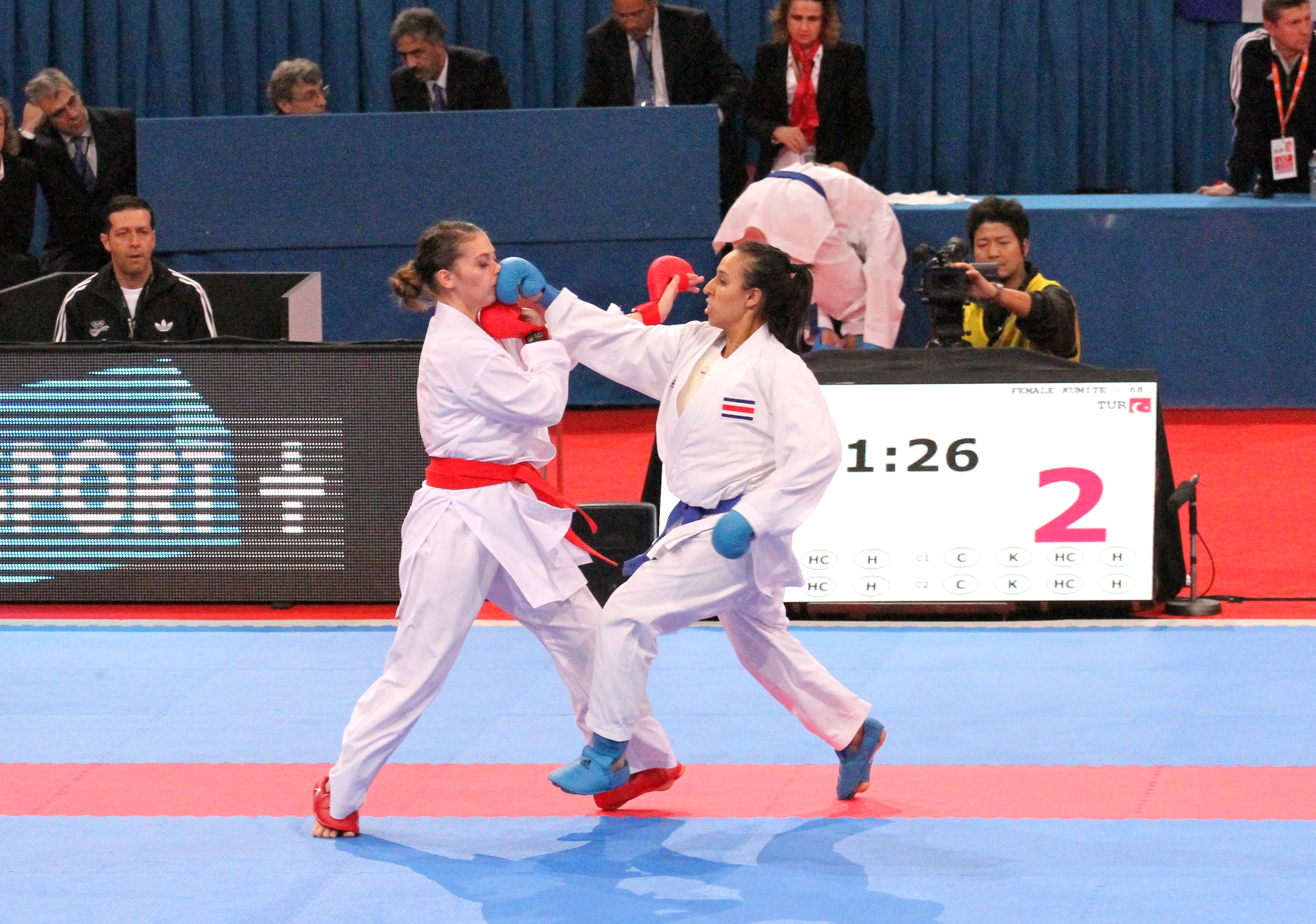
Gyaku Zuki at the WC 2012

Parts of the Arm used in Attack
Japanese	English
Zuki/Tsuki	Punch
Uchi	Strike
Age Zuki	Rising punch
Kagi Zuki	Hook punch
Yama Zuki	Mountain punch
Awase Zuki	Two handed punch
Heiko Zuki	Parallel punch
Hasami Zuki	Scissors punch
Nagashi Zuki	Flowing punch
Ko Uchi	Bent wrist strike
Washi-De	Eagle hand
Kaisho	Open hand
Choku Zuki	Straight punch
Ura Zuki	Upper punch
Uraken Uchi	Back fist strike
Furi Zuki	Circular punch
Mawashi Zuki	Round hook punch
Tate Zuki	Vertical punch
Kizami Zuki	Jab punch
Oi Zuki	Lunge punch
Gyaku-zuki	Reverse punch
Nihon Zuki	Double punch
Sanbon Zuki	Triple punch
Jun Zuki	Leading punch
Morote Zuki	Two fisted punch
Furi Sute	Whip swing
Hojo Oshi	Augmented push
Tsukami Hiki	Grab-pull
Ashi Dori	Leg take down
Toki Waza	Freeing technique
Hazushi Waza	Throwing-off technique
Nage Waza	Throwing technique
haito Uchi	ridge hand
hiji uchi (empi)	elbow strike
kaiko-ken	flat fist
koken	bent wrist
nakadaka-ken	middle finger knuckle fist
nukite Uchi	finger thrust
seiken	fist
shotei Uchi	palm of hand
shuto Uchi	knife hand
tettsui	hammer hand
yubi hasami	finger pinch

== Foot techniques ==
Japanese	English
Mai Geri Keage	Front kick (snap)
Mai Geri Kekomi	Front kick (thrust)
Kansetsu Geri	Stomping joint kick
Hiza Geri	Knee kick
Nidan Geri	Double front kick
Mai Tobi Geri	Jump kick
	Swing kick
Yoko Geri Keage	Side kick (snap)
Yoko Geri (Kekomi)	Side kick (thrust)
Mawashi Geri	Round kick
Ushiro-Geri	Back kick
Ashi Barai	Foot sweep
Kakato Otoshi	Heel drop
Fumikomi	stomp (strike)

== Foot movements ==
Movements of foot used in Attack
Japanese	English
Suri Ashi	Sliding step
Tsugi Ashi	Shuffling step
Ayumi Ashi	Natural stepping
Yori Ashi	Dragging step
Keri Ashi	Kicking foot
Tenshin	Moving
Chakuchi	Landing
Issoku-cho	One foot length

== Stances ==
Stances used in Karate
Japanese	English
Dachi	Stance
Heisoku Dachi	Closed foot stance (feet together)
Musubi Dachi	Heels together - feet at an angle
Heiko Dachi	Parallel stance (feet shoulder width apart)
Hachiji Dachi	Natural stance (feet shoulder width apart - toes slightly pointed out)
Shiko Dachi	Straddle leg stance
Kiba Dachi	Horse riding stance
Sanchin Dachi	Hourglass stance
Zen Kutsu Dachi	Front Stance
Han Zen Kutsu Dachi	Half front stance
Fudo Dachi	Free stance
Kokutsu Dachi	Back stance
Neko Ashi Dachi	Cat stance
Renoji Dachi	"レ" stance
Seisan Dachi	Side facing straddle stance
Koshi Dachi	Squat stance

== Blocking techniques ==
pages 129–136 of Higaonna's Traditional Karatedo Vol. 1 Fundamental Techniques

Blocking used in Karate
Japanese	English
Uke	Block
Age Uke (Jodan)	Rising block (Head)
Chudan Uke	Inside circular block
Harai Uke	Sweeping block
Yoko Uke	Side block
Morote Sukui Uke	Two hand scoop block
Shotei Harai Uke	Palm heel sweeping block
Shotei Otoshi Uke	Palm heel descending block
Hojo Uke	Augmented block
Hari Uke	Bow & Arrow block
Haishu Mawashi Osae Uke	Back hand circling press block
Kuri Uke	Circular elbow block
Ura Kake Uke	Back-hand hook block
Uchi Hiki Uke	Middle level inward pulling block
Yoko (Soto) Hiki Uke	Side (outward) pulling block
Kosa Uke	Cross block
Kake Uke	Hook block
Ude Osae	Arm wedge
Shotei Osae	Palm-heel press
Gedan barai	Downward block
Hiki Uke	Grasping block
Shuto Uke	Knife hand block
Shotei Uke	Palm heel block
Chudan Uchi Uke	Inside forearm block
Ko Uke	Wrist block
Gedan Uchi Barai	Inside downward block (open hand)
Ura Uke	Back hand block
Hiji Uke	Elbow block
Hiza Uke	Knee block
Mawashi Uke	Roundhouse block
Morote Uke	Double handed block
Tora Guchi	Tiger mouth (block & strike)

== See also ==
- List of shotokan techniques
- List of Shito-ryu techniques

== Literature ==
- Higaonna, Morio (1985). Traditional Karatedo Vol. 1 Fundamental Techniques. ISBN 0-8048-2110-0.
