= Toyotarō =

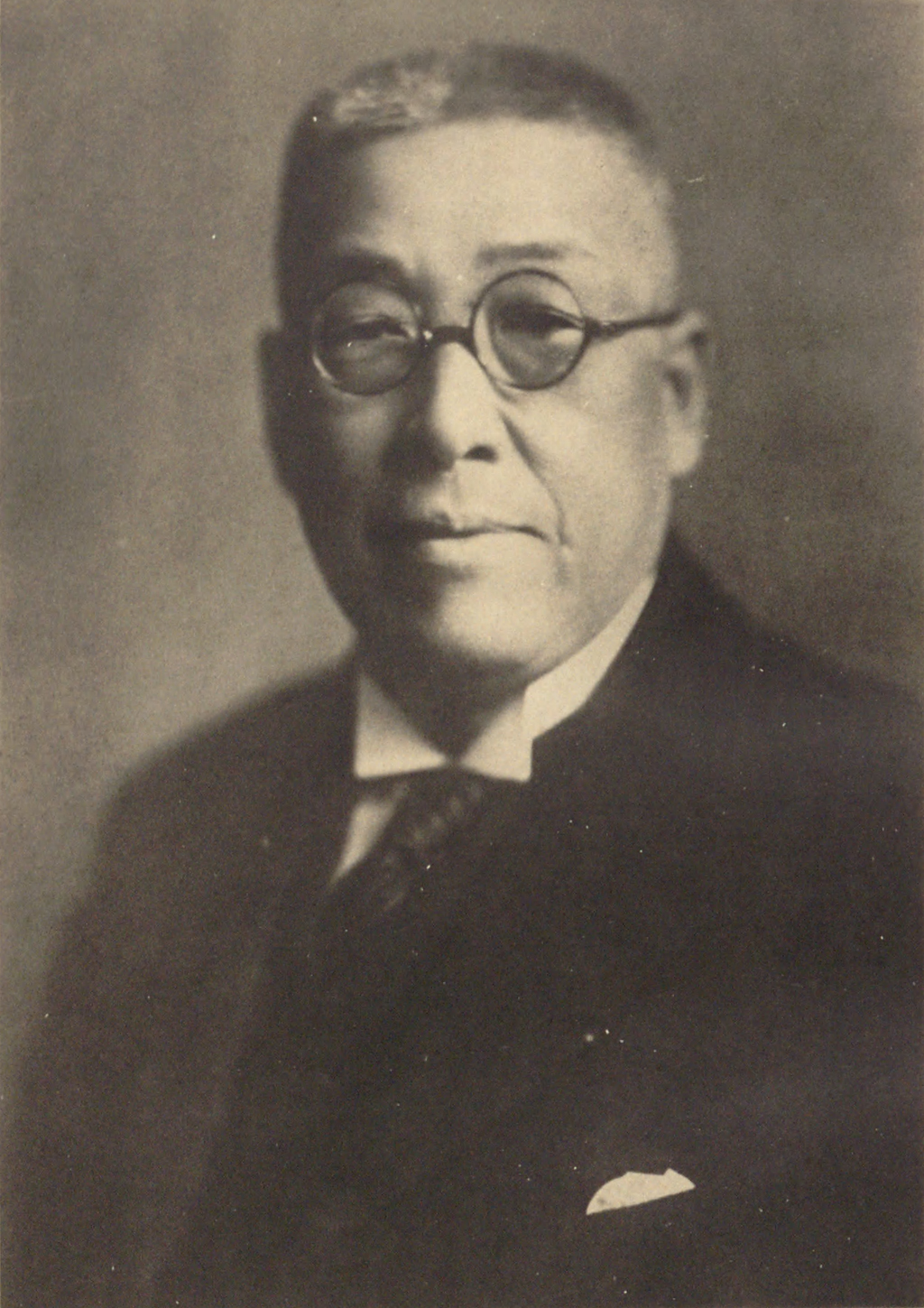
- Tototaro Isomura (1868–1939), Japanese bureaucrat, businessman, and member of the House of Peers in the Meiji period.
- Pronunciation: tojotaɾoɯ (IPA)
- Gender: Male

Origin
- Origin: Japanese
- Meaning: Different meanings depending on the kanji used

Other names
- Alternative spelling: Toyotaro (Kunrei-shiki) Toyotaro (Nihon-shiki) Toyotarō, Toyotarou, Toyotaro, Toyotaroh (Hepburn)

Toyotarō is a masculine Japanese given name.

== Written forms ==
Toyotarō can be written using different combinations of kanji characters. Here are some examples:

The characters used for "taro" (太郎) literally means "thick (big) son" and usually used as a suffix to a masculine name, especially for the first son. The "toyo" part of the name can use a variety of characters, each of which will change the meaning of the name.

- 豊太郎, "bountiful, big son"
- 登代太郎, "climb up, generation, big son"
- 斗代太郎, "Big Dipper, generation, big son"

Other combinations...

- 豊太朗, "bountiful, thick, bright"
- 豊多朗, "bountiful, many, bright"
- 豊汰朗, "bountiful, excessive, bright"
- 登代太朗, "climb up, generation, thick, bright"
- 登代多朗, "climb up, generation, many, bright"

The name can also be written in hiragana とよたろう or katakana トヨタロウ.

== Notable people with the name ==
- Toyotarou (とよたろう), Japanese manga artist.
- Toyotaro Isomura (磯村 豊太郎, 1868–1939), Japanese bureaucrat, businessman, and member of the House of Peers in the Meiji period.
- Toyotaro Fukazawa (深沢 豊太郎, 1895–1944), Japanese politician.
- Toyotaro Miyazaki (born 1944), Japanese martial artist.
- Toyotarō Yūki (結城 豊太郎; 1877–1951), Japanese banker.
