= List of shotokan techniques =

This is a list of techniques practiced in the Shotokan style of karate.

== Stances (Tachi Kata) ==
1. Heisoku Dachi: formal attention stance
2. Musubi Dachi: informal attention stance, both heels touching and feet at 45° angle
3. Heiko Dachi: parallel attention stance (e.g. in the kata Kanku Dai)
4. Hachiji Dachi: outward feet stance
5. Uchi Hachiji Dachi: inward feet stance; reverse of hachiji Dachi
6. Iaigoshi Dachi: kneeling stance (e.g. in the kata Enpi)
7. Fudo Dachi: rooted stance (e.g. in the kata Bassai Dai)
8. Hangetsu Dachi: half-moon stance (e.g. in the kata Hangetsu)
9. Kiba Dachi: horse stance/side stance (e.g. in the Tekki katas)
10. Kokutsu Dachi: back stance (in almost all Shotokan katas; usually first learned in Heian Shodan)
11. Kosa Dachi: cross-legged stance (e.g. in the kata Heian Yondan)
12. Neko ashi Dachi: cat stance (e.g. in the kata Bassai Sho)
13. Mitsurin Dachi: jungle stance
14. Renoji Dachi: stance in which the feet form the shape of the Japanese katakana “レ” when seen from above, or relaxed stance (e.g. in the kata Kanku Dai)
15. Teiji Dachi: t-stance
16. Sanchin Dachi: hourglass stance (e.g. in the kata Sanchin)
17. Katashi Dachi: crane-like stance (e.g. in the kata Enpi)
18. Sagi Ashi Dachi: heron stance (e.g. in the kata Jitte)
19. Gankaku Dachi: crane stance (e.g. in the kata Gankaku)
20. Tsuru Ashi Dachi: hanging leg stance
21. Zenkutsu Dachi: front stance ТжвЧ
22. Yoi Dachi (usually called Yoi): basic stance/Ready position
  - Yoi Dachi is Heiko Dachi with the hands out in a ready position.
23. Yama Dachi: mountain stance (e.g. in the kata Jitte)
24. Sochin Dachi: high-low blocking rooted stance
25. Shizen tai: natural stance

=== Preparatory positions ===
1. koshi gamae: hip preparatory position
2. ryoken koshi gamae: double hip preparatory position (e.g. in the kata, Heian sandan)
3. morote koko gamae: double handed preparatory position (e.g. in the kata, Enpi)

== “Reception” techniques (uke-waza) Blocks ==
=== Using the arms ===
1. age-uke: rising block
2. empi uke: elbow block (e.g. in the kata, Heian sandan)
3. gedan barai: sweeping low block
4. gedan morote barai: double sweeping low block (usually while going into kiba Dachi)
5. haiwan uke: square side block (e.g. in the kata, Heian nidan)
6. gedan juji uke: downward x block
7. jodan juji uke: upward x block
8. kaisho age uke: open-palm rising block
9. kaisho haiwan uke: knife-hand square side block (e.g. in the kata, Heian yondan)
10. kaisho juji uke: open-palm x block (e.g. in the kata, Heian godan)
11. kakiwake uke: floating x block (e.g. in the kata, Heian yondan)
12. morote uke: double forearm block (e.g. in the kata, Heian sandan)
13. nagashi uke: rising palm sweep block (e.g. in the kata, Tekki shodan)
14. osae uke: palm block
15. otoshi uke: dropping forearm block
16. shuto age uke: rising knife-hand block
17. shuto gedan barai: knife-hand sweeping low block
18. shuto uke: knife hand block
19. shuto mawashi uke (roundhouse block with knife-hand)
20. soto uke (外受け): outside forearm block
21. morote sukui uke: scooping block
22. tate shuto uke: half knife-hand block
23. Te osae uke: dropping palm block
24. Uchi ude uke (内腕受け)/ uchi uke (内受け): inside forearm block
25. Gyako uchi uke: reverse outside mid-level (e.g. in the kata, Heian nidan)
26. Ude barai: reverse sweeping forearm block
27. Heo Tsukami: hair grab (e.g. in the kata, Enpi)
28. Ushiro gedan barai: back low sweeping block (e.g. in the kata, Enpi)
29. Teisho uke: palm heel block
30. Chudan soete uke: added hand inside block (e.g. in the kata, Bassai Dai)
31. Tsuki uke: punching block
32. Morote Tsukami uke: augmented grabbing/throwing block
33. Mawashi uke: roundhouse or circle block (e.g. in the kata, Unsu)
34. Haishu uke: backhand block (e.g. in the kata, Heian godan)
35. Kosa uke (also known as joge uke): cross block (e.g. in the kata, Heian sandan)
36. Teisho awase uke: hands together block (e.g. in the kata, Gankaku)
37. Zenwan uke: forearm block
38. Gedan kaki uke: downward hook block
39. Joge kaki uke: up & down hook block (e.g. in the kata, Enpi)
40. manji uke: "manji (卍)"-shaped block

=== Using the legs ===
1. Ashikubi Kake Uke: hooking ankle block
2. Mika Zuki Geri Uke: crescent kick block (e.g. in the kata, Heian sandan)
3. Nami Ashi, a.k.a. Nami Gaeshi: leg snapping wave block (e.g. in the kata, Tekki shodan)
4. Sokutei Osae Uke: pressing sole block
5. Sokuto Osae Uke: pressing footedge block

== Striking techniques (Uchi-waza) ==
1. Age Empi: Rising elbow strike
2. Age Zuki: Rising Punch
3. Choku Zuki: Straight punch
4. Chudan Juki (originally,"tsuki"): Mid-level punch
5. Empi Uchi: Elbow strike
6. Gyaku zuki: Reverse punch
7. Haishu Uchi: Back hand strike
8. Haito Uchi: Ridge hand strike
9. Gyaku Haito: Reverse Ridge hand strike
10. Otoshi Gyaku Haito: Dropping reverse Ridge hand strike
11. Jodan Haito: Upward Ridge hand strike (e.g. in the kata, Unsu)
12. Age Heito: Rising Ridge hand strike
13. Heiko Zuki: Parallel or Double punch
14. Hasami Zuki: Scissor strike
15. Hasami Nakadaka Ken: Scissor Middle Finger strike (e.g. in the kata, Chinte)
16. Jun Zuki or Oi-zuki: Step through punch
17. Kagi Zuki: Hook punch
18. Atama Shiri Uchi: Head-Butt strike
19. Kizami Zuki or Maete: jabbing punch (like a 'jab')
20. Mae Mawashi Empi Uchi: Augmented side elbow strike (e.g. in the kata, Heian yondan)
21. Mawashi Empi: Hook elbow strike
22. Atsuen Empi Uchi: Rolling elbow strike (e.g. in the kata Nijushiho)
23. Sokumen Zuki: Double side punch (e.g. in the kata, Tekki shodan)
24. Ippon Ken: One finger Punch/Strike
25. Nakadaka Ken: Middle finger punch/strike
26. Nihon Ken: Two finger punch/strike; eye strike (e.g. in the kata, Chinte)
27. Hiraken: Four knuckle strike
28. Nukite: Spear-hand strike
29. Ippon Nukite: 1 finger Spear-hand strike (e.g. in the kata, Unsu)
30. Nihon Nukite: 2 finger Spear-hand strike
31. Oi zuki: Stepping punch
32. Sanbon Zuki: Triple punch (Age zuki, Gyaku Zuki, Choku Zuki)
33. Shuto Uchi: Knifehand strike
34. Shuto Yoko Ganmen Uchi (knife-hand strike to head)
35. Shuto Sakotsu Uchikomi (driving knife-hand to sternum)
36. Shuto Sakotsu Uchi (knife-hand strike to clavicle)
37. Shuto Hizo Uchi (knife-hand strike to spleen)
38. Shuto Jodan Uchi (inside knife-hand to neck)
39. Sokumen Empi Uchi: Augmented elbow strike (e.g. in the kata, Tekki shodan)
40. Tate Zuki: Half reverse punch, with a vertical fist
41. Amuba Tsukami: Arm-Bar hold
42. Teisho Furi Uchi: Sideways palm-heel strike
43. Teisho Uchi: Palm-heel strike
44. Tate Teisho Uchi: Vertical, or Rising palm heel strike
45. Tettsui: Hammer-fist strike
46. Tettsui Hasami Uchi: Hammer-fist scissor strike
47. Tettsui Yoko Uchi (bottom fist strike to side)
48. Otoshi Uraken: Dropping Backfist in kosa Dachi (e.g. in the kata, Heian yondan)
49. Uraken Uchi: Backfist strike
50. Uraken Mawashi Uchi (backfist circular strike to the head)
51. Uraken Sayu Ganmen Uchi (backfist strike to side)
52. Uraken Hizo Uchi: backfist strike to spleen
53. Ushiro Empi Ate: backwards elbow strike
54. Ura Zuki: Close short punch, with inverted fist, similar in nature to an 'uppercut'
55. Ushiro Empi: Back elbow strike
56. Yama Zuki ("mountain punch"): Wide double fisted strike (e.g. in the kata, Bassai dai and Wankan)
57. Awase Zuki: Narrow double fisted strike
58. Yoko Empi: Side elbow strike
59. Yoko Tettsui: Sideways hammer-fist strike (e.g. in the kata, Heian nidan)
60. Gyaku Age Zuki: Rising reverse punch (e.g. in the kata, Enpi)
61. Tsukiage: Uppercut (e.g. in the kata, Heian godan)
62. Kumate: Bear Claw, or Tiger Claw strike
63. Seiryuto: Ox-Jaw Strike
64. Heiko Seiryuto: Parallel or double Ox-Jaw Strike (e.g. in the kata, Gojushiho Sho)
65. Kokuto: crane head strike
66. Washite: Eagle hand or, eagle claw strike (e.g. in the kata, Gojushiho Dai)
67. Keito: Chicken head strike
68. Age Keito: Rising Chicken head strike
69. Yumi Zuki: Bow drawing strike (e.g. in the kata, Sochin)

== Kicking techniques (Keri-waza) ==
1. Ashi barai: Foot sweep
2. Fumikomi Geri: Stomp kick
3. Hiza geri: Knee strike
4. Kin geri: Kick in the groin, performed like front kick but with the feet
5. Mae-ashi geri: Front kick with front leg
6. Mae-ashi mawashi geri: Front roundhouse kick with front leg
7. Mae geri: Front kick
8. Mae Hiza geri: Front knee kick
9. Mae-ren geri: Double front kick (= double mae geri)
10. Tobi mae geri: Front flying/jump kick
11. Tobi yoko geri: Jumping side kick
12. Tobi mawashi geri: Jumping roundhouse kick
13. Tobi mikazuki geri: Jumping crescent kick
14. Tobi gyaku mikazuki geri: Jumping reverse crescent
15. Tobi ushiro geri: Jumping spinning back kick
16. Tobi ushiro mawashi geri: Jumping spinning hook kick
17. Tobi hiza geri: Jumping knee kick
18. Oi Mae Geri: Lunging rear-leg front kick
19. Mawashi geri: Round kick
20. Mawashi hiza geri: Circular knee kick
21. Mikazuki geri: Crescent kick
22. Gyaku mikazuki geri: Reverse Crescent kick
23. Nidan tobi geri: Jumping Double front kick
24. Ura mawashi geri or Kagi geri: Upper inside round kick, a.k.a. hook kick
25. Ushiro geri: Back kick
26. Ushiro mawashi geri : spinning hook kick
27. Ushiro kekomi: Back side thrust kick
28. Otoshi Mawashi Geri: Circular falling kick
29. Yoko geri keage: Side snap kick
30. Yoko geri kekomi: Side thrust kick
31. Yoko tobi geri: Jumping side kick
32. Ono Geri: Axe Kick
33. Yoni Tsokia: Ducking leg hook
34. Ushiro Hiza Geri : back spinning knee strike
35. Otshi Hiza Geri : circular falling knee strike
36. Kakato Geri :kick with heels to jaw
37. Ura kakato geri: upper inside roundhouse heel kick
38. Otoshi kakato geri: circular falling heel kick to head or spine
39. Hasu geri: lotus kick, or reverse roundhouse kick
40. Kakudo geri: Angle kick

== See also ==
- List of Shotokan organizations
- Shotokan
- Passai
