= Enpi (kata) =

Karate technique

Enpi (燕飛), also frequently transliterated as Empi, is a kata practiced by Shotokan and other karate styles. Enpi means Flight of the Swallow.

Enpi comes from the Okinawan martial art of Tomari-te, where it first appeared in 1683. It is believed to have been influenced by Chinese boxing. It is the sister kata to Wansu. Funakoshi Gichin changed the name to Enpi when he moved to the Japanese mainland in the 1920s. Funakoshi changed the names of many of the kata, in an effort to make the Okinawan art more palatable to the then nationalistic Japanese. The most commonly accepted theory about its creation and development is that a Sappushi Wang Ji, an official from Xiuning, transmitted the kata while serving on Okinawa. Legend has that Wang Ji had the habit of throwing and jumping on his adversaries. Because of this dynamic form of combat, this kata resembles a swallow in flight.

In Gichin Funakoshi's dojo, Enpi was considered an example of the Shôrin (light and fast), rather than the Shôrei (strong and powerful) kata.

== Instructions ==
Enpi or Flight of the Swallow is composed of 37 movements, arranged in the shape of a T, typically taking around one minute to perform altogether. Step-wise movements are as follows:

Start position. From shizen tai step into heisoku dachi, place the right fist (back of hand to the front) to your left hand side into the palm of your left hand, your fingers on the left hand should be pointed out to the front.

1. Step to the left with the left leg, bend both your knees and drop towards the floor on your right knee, performing a right handed gedan barai and the left fist on your chest. This opening move is interpreted either as a defense against an attack to the back of the hand, which is rarely considered in contemporary karate, or as a sweep against an opponent's kicking leg, while grabbing the opponent and pulling them close.
2. Step back into haiko dachi with your right fist again at your left hand side, this time both hands closed. (back of right hand to the front, back of left hand towards the floor)
3. Turn 90 degrees to the right, step into zenkutsu dachi but keeping the feet in line, performing gedan barai with the right arm.
4. Move into kiba dachi facing the front and perform kagi tsuki with the left arm.
5. Step forward with the left leg into zenkutsu dachi and perform gedan barai with the left arm.
6. Punch jodan age tsuki with the right arm. This movement simulates striking an opponent beneath the chin.
7. Right hand opens, grab and then perform hiza geri (knee strike) with the right knee, drop down into kosa ashi dachi, performing gedan tsuki (low punch) with the left, the right hand pulls back to side of face.
8. Step backwards with the left leg into a deep zenkutsu dachi and perform gedan barai with the right hand over the back leg while facing towards the back leg. This is a characteristic application in this kate.
9. Straighten up and perform gedan barai with the left hand.
10. Punch jodan age tsuki with the right arm.
11. Right hand opens, grab and then perform hiza geri (knee strike) with the right knee, drop down into kosa ashi dachi, performing gedan tsuki (low punch) with the left, the right hand pulls back to side of face.
12. Step backwards with the left leg into a deep zenkutsu dachi and perform gedan barai with the right hand over the back leg while facing towards the back leg.
13. Straighten up and perform gedan barai with the left hand.
14. Raise the left knee up and twist the body 45 degree to the right, the left hand rises into jodan shuto uke and then the body rotates to the left 45 degrees into kiba dachi facing the front with the left arm out at 45 degrees.
15. Strike the left hand with the right wrist (back of fist to the front), move the right foot to behind the left knee in Tsuru ashi dachi (gankaku dachi (crane stance)) and Kiai.
16. Step out into kiba dachi with the right leg and perform tate shuto chudan uke with the left hand.
17. Right chudan choku tsuki
18. Left chudan choku tsuki
19. Move the left foot to the left into zenkutsu dachi whilst performing gedan barai.
20. Punch jodan age tsuki with the right arm.
21. Step forward into kokutsu dachi and perform shuto uke with the right hand.
22. Bring the right leg back to the left and step out with the left leg into kokutsu dachi performing shukto uke with the left hand.
23. Perform right chudan choku tsuki.
24. Step forward with the right foot into kokutsu dachi and perform shuto uke with the right hand.
25. Pivot counter clockwise 180 degrees moving the left leg to the left into zenkutsu dachi performing gedan barai with the left arm.
26. Punch jodan age tsuki with the right arm.
27. Right hand opens, grab and then perform hiza geri (knee strike) with the right knee, drop down into kosa ashi dachi, performing gedan tsuki (low punch) with the left, the right hand pulls back to side of face.
28. Step backwards with the left leg into a deep zenkutsu dachi and perform gedan barai with the right hand over the back leg while facing towards the back leg.
29. Straighten up and perform gedan barai with the left hand.
30. Right hand teisho oshi age uke (rising pressing block). Head and hand turned 45 degrees to the front, left fist on left hip. This is interpreted as a counter-attack against the opponent's elbow.
31. Bring the left foot half a step back and then, turning 90 degrees towards the right, step forward with the right leg into zenkutsu dachi. Perform right hand teisho oshi age uke and left hand teisho oshi gedan uke (downward pressing block).
32. Step forward into left zenkutsu dachi whilst perform left hand teisho oshi age uke and right hand teisho oshi gedan uke (the left palm rises as the right palm lowers).
33. Step forward with the right leg into zenkutsu dachi. Perform right hand teisho oshi age uke and left hand teisho oshi gedan uke.
34. Slide both feet forward into kokutsu dachi and perform gedan barai with right hand.
35. Slide both feet forward into hiza kussu (bent knee), lean forward and perform shuto gedan ni oshidasu (thrust downwards) with the right hand and jodan tsukami uke (upper level grasping block (palm upwards)) with the left hand. From this position and into the next, the opponent is first thrown to the ground over the front leg, and then leapt overtop of to avoid the opponent's sweep from the ground.
36. Pivot counter clockwise on the left foot and jump into the air turning 360 degrees. Kiai. Landing in right foot forward kokutsu dachi performing shuto uke with the right arm facing the front.
37. Step back with the right foot into kokutsu dachi performing shuto uke with the left arm.

Finish position. Bring the left foot back into heisoku dachi, place the right fist (back of hand to the front) to your left hand side into the palm of your left hand, your fingers on the left hand should be pointed out to the front. Same as starting position.

== Embusen ==
This is the embusen of Enpi

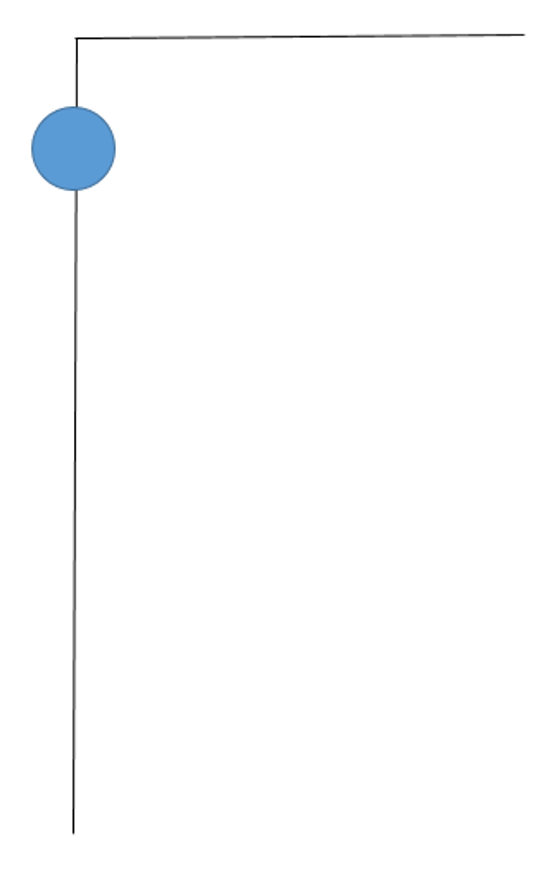
Embusen kata Enpi

== See also ==
- Bunkai
- List of shotokan techniques
