= Karate throws =

Techniques of throwing opponent in karate

Karate's Nage waza (投げ技, throwing techniques) is the set of techniques whereby the opponent is thrown to the ground. While typical students of karate focus most of their attention on learning striking techniques, karate throws are considered indispensable for self-defense and, although not always taught, are part of the classical art.

== History ==
Practical experience has shown that striking techniques alone can be ineffective. In certain situations, or against certain opponents, striking techniques do not work well, such as when in a tight space, engaging in combat with an armored fighter, or when lying down, for example after falling. Over time, karate has sought means to overcome these deficiencies.

While still adhering to its core principles, karate progressively introduced throwing techniques into its repertoire. These techniques were chosen primarily from Japanese and Chinese martial arts such as judo or qinna. The adaptation of other martial arts was particularly intense during the 19th and 20th centuries. Judo was perhaps the most influential. Discussions between Jigoro Kano and Gichin Funakoshi led to throwing techniques being introduced in shotokan and Kenwa Mabuni. The inspiration for shito-ryu's throwing techniques also included judo.

== Characteristics ==
Unlike most martial arts, karate's throwing techniques emphasize rapidity of execution and effectiveness when starting relatively far away, where judo opponents, for example, are usually less than a meter away from each other. Although adapted for fighting at a distance, all karate throwing techniques have their equivalent in judo and ju-jitsu.

== Kari waza ==
Kari waza (刈 技, cutting techniques) is a set of throwing techniques using hands and feet. Unlike what occurs in other martial arts, sweeps in karate do not necessitate holding your adversary's body, although holding may help in controlling the technique and directing the fall of the opponent.

=== Ashi barai ===
Deashi barai (足掃, foot sweep) is made in a circular path, against the opponent's foot (or leg below the knee), while the hips turn away (gyaku kaiten). The sweep can topple, put off-balance, or make the opponent overly cautious.

=== Kakato gaeshi ===
Kakato gaeshi (踵返し, reverse heel trip) is placing the heel behind the opponent's heel, and pulling or locking with a contrary movement to the opponent's leg. This can be done from suwari waza (on the knees) or, preferably, from the shiko dachi stance.

=== Ko uchi gari ===
Ko uchi gari (小内刈, minor inner reaping) is similar to the technique ko soto gari, except that the strike is to the inside of the leg or foot.

=== Nami gaeshi ===
Nami gaeshi (波返し, returning wave strike) is a technique where the leg is passed in a circular motion, behind the opponent's leg, bringing the foot back to the height of the knee, while simultaneously pushing in a contrary motion. This versatile technique can be used for attack and defense.

=== O soto gari ===
O soto gari (大外刈, major outer reaping) is performed by sweeping your leg, from the outside, with the opponent's weight on the near heel and against the back of the leg, at the calf. The movement should be started from sho zenkutsu, or moro ashi, dachi (stance), without stretching the base. The final position is identical to that at the start original. The hips turn jun kaiten (with the technique) at first and then koshi kaiten (away), with the kick, which is basically fumikiri geri (stomping cutting kick.

=== O uchi gari ===
O uchi gari (大内刈, major inner reaping) is similar to o soto gari but from between the opponent's legs.

=== Morote gari ===
Morote gari (諸手刈, open arms reaping), or Udewa (腕輪, bracelet), is done, after a direct thrust at the belt line, by holding both opponent's legs, locking, and pulling them, and by using any recoil against the opponent.

== Kuruma waza ==

Kuruma waza (车 技, wheel techniques) is a set of techniques that cause the opponent to be curled up and to describe a circular path in falling.

=== Irimi Nage ===
Irimi Nage (体落し, Entering Throw) must be executed where a leg blocks the movement of the opponent's legs while applying a force on the upper part of opponent's body.

== Sutemi waza ==
Sutemi waza (舍身 技, sacrifice techniques) are those techniques in which the karateka falls while forcing the opponent down as well, controlling both falls to the opponent's disadvantage.

Judo and jiu-jitsu have similar sacrifice techniques, but with a greater number of movements. For example, karate's tomoe guruma is similar to both the tomoe-nage and the sumi-gaeshi of judo.

Even if one controls the movement, there is some degree of unpredictability. Some people say that sutemi waza should be used as a last resort, because the ground grappling techniques (ne waza) of karate are restricted, and because karate's striking techniques are most effective when on top.

=== Kani basami ===

Kani basami (蟹挟, crab pinch), also known as "scissors stroke", a very dangerous and now banned move, is done by passing the lower leg behind the opponent's legs and driving the other into the front at waist height, while dropping, optionally clinging to the opponent with one hand at shoulder height.
