= Ushiro-Geri =

Karate turning kick technique

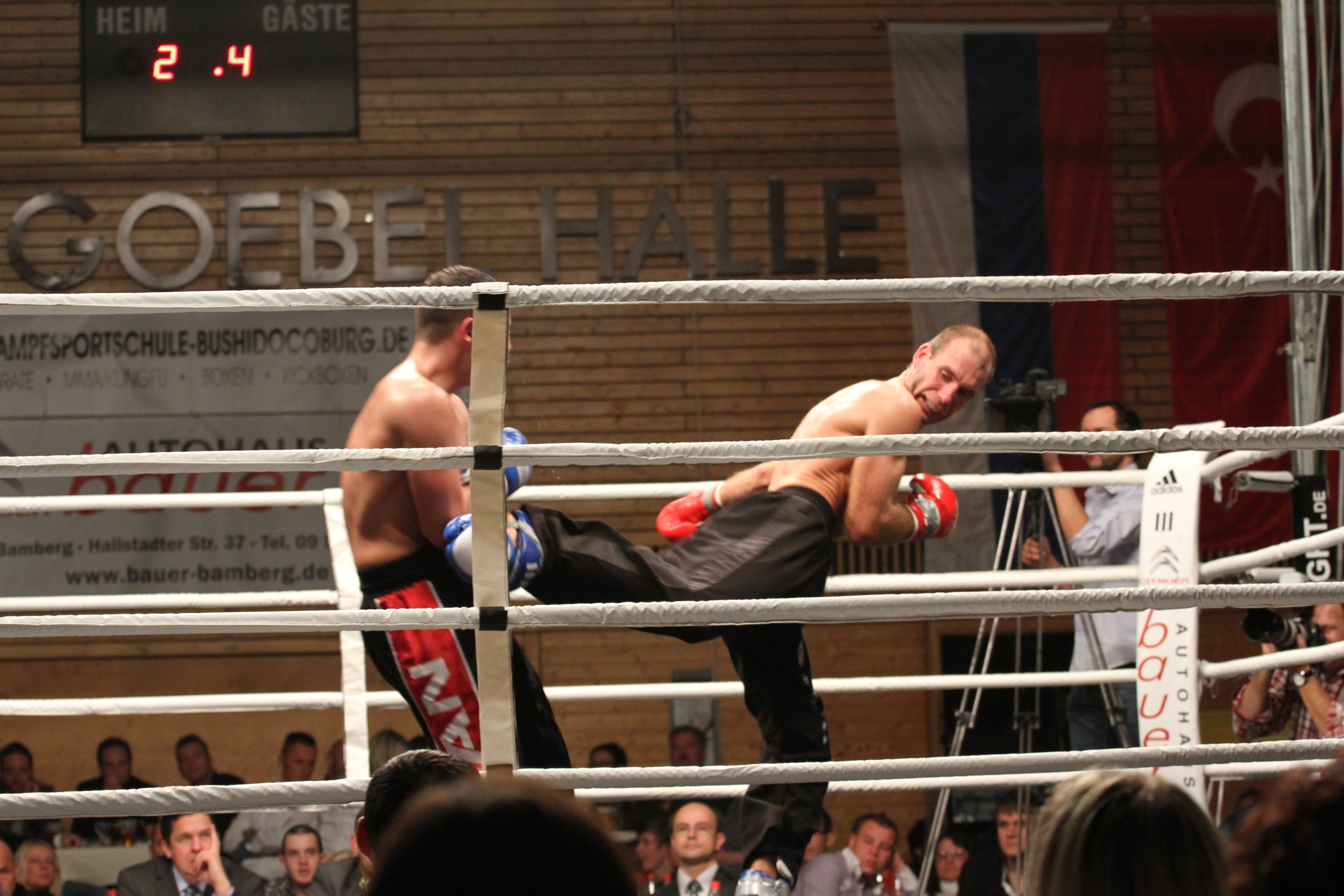
- Ushiro-Geri in kickboxing

Japanese name
- Kanji: 後ろ蹴り
Transcriptions
- Revised Hepburn: Ushiro-Geri

Ushiro-geri (Japanese: 後ろ蹴り) is the Japanese term for turning back kick, a kick employed in karate. The kick is a basic move but there are variations of the Ushiro-Geri.

- Ushiro-Geri Kekomi
- Ushiro-Geri Keage
- Ushiro-Mawashi-Geri
