= Roundhouse kick =

Type of kick used in martial arts and combat

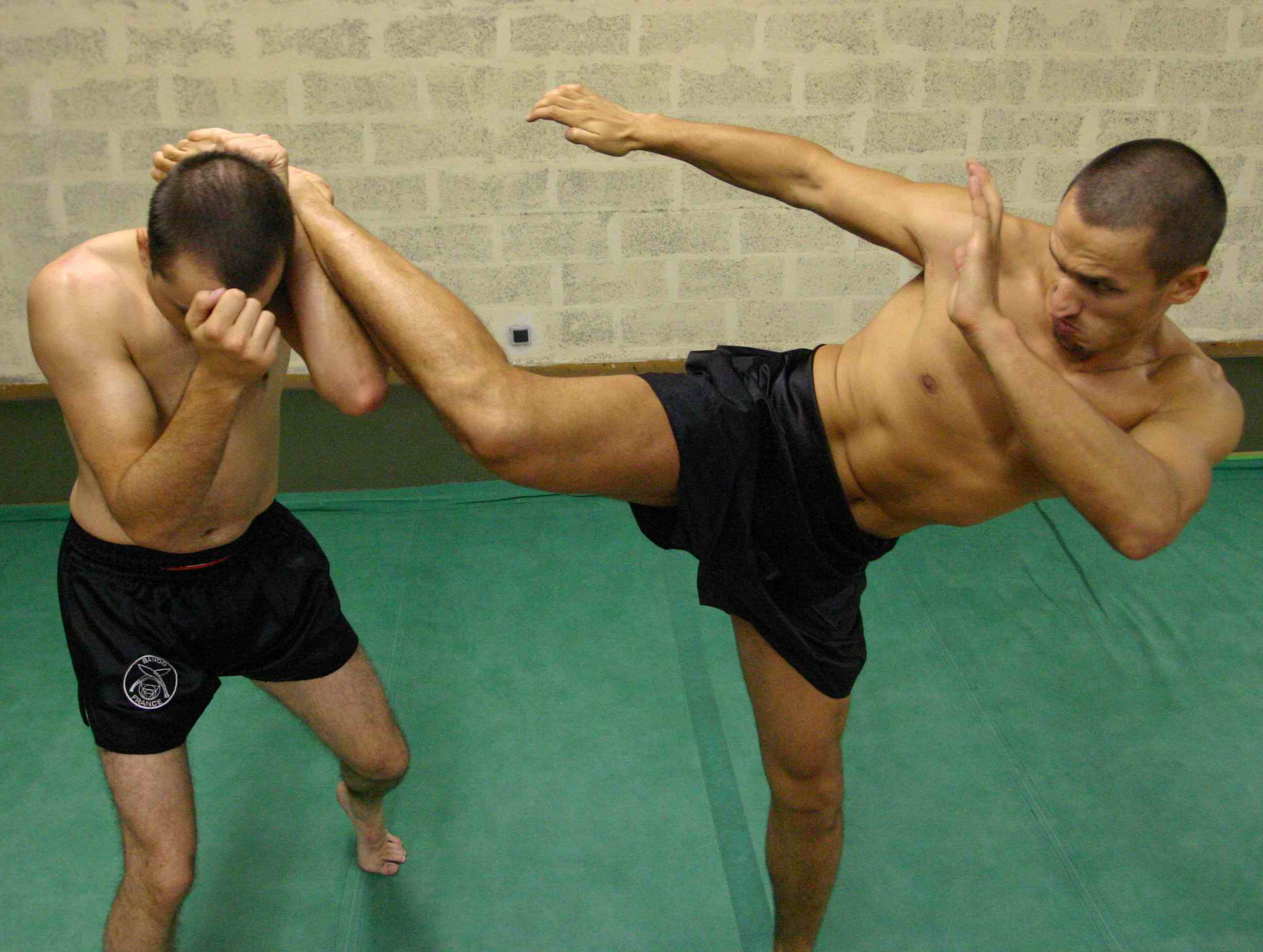

Chinese name
- Traditional Chinese: 鞭腿
Transcriptions
Yue: Cantonese
- Jyutping: bin1 teoi2

Korean name
- Hangul: 돌려 차기
Transcriptions
- Revised Romanization: dollyeo chagi
- McCune–Reischauer: tollyŏ ch'agi

Japanese name
- Kanji: 回し蹴り
- Hiragana: まわしげり
Transcriptions
- Revised Hepburn: mawashi-geri
- Kunrei-shiki: mawasi-geri

A roundhouse kick (also known as round kick or turning kick) is a kick in which the practitioner lifts the knee while turning the supporting foot and body in a semicircular motion, extending the leg striking with the lower part of the shin and/or the instep (top of the foot). The ball of the foot can also be used to strike the target and is preferable when power breaking thick boards. This type of kick is utilized in many different martial arts and is popular in both non-contact and full-contact martial arts competitions. The kick has many variations based on stance, leg movement, striking surface, and the height of the kick.

== Semi-circular kick ==
A semi-circular kick is a round kick to forty five degree roundhouse kick (or "diagonal kick"). Most popular in kick-boxing, lethwei, and muay Thai, it can be used in almost every situation. With this kick, all parts of the opponent's body can be attacked and every kind of attack can be countered.

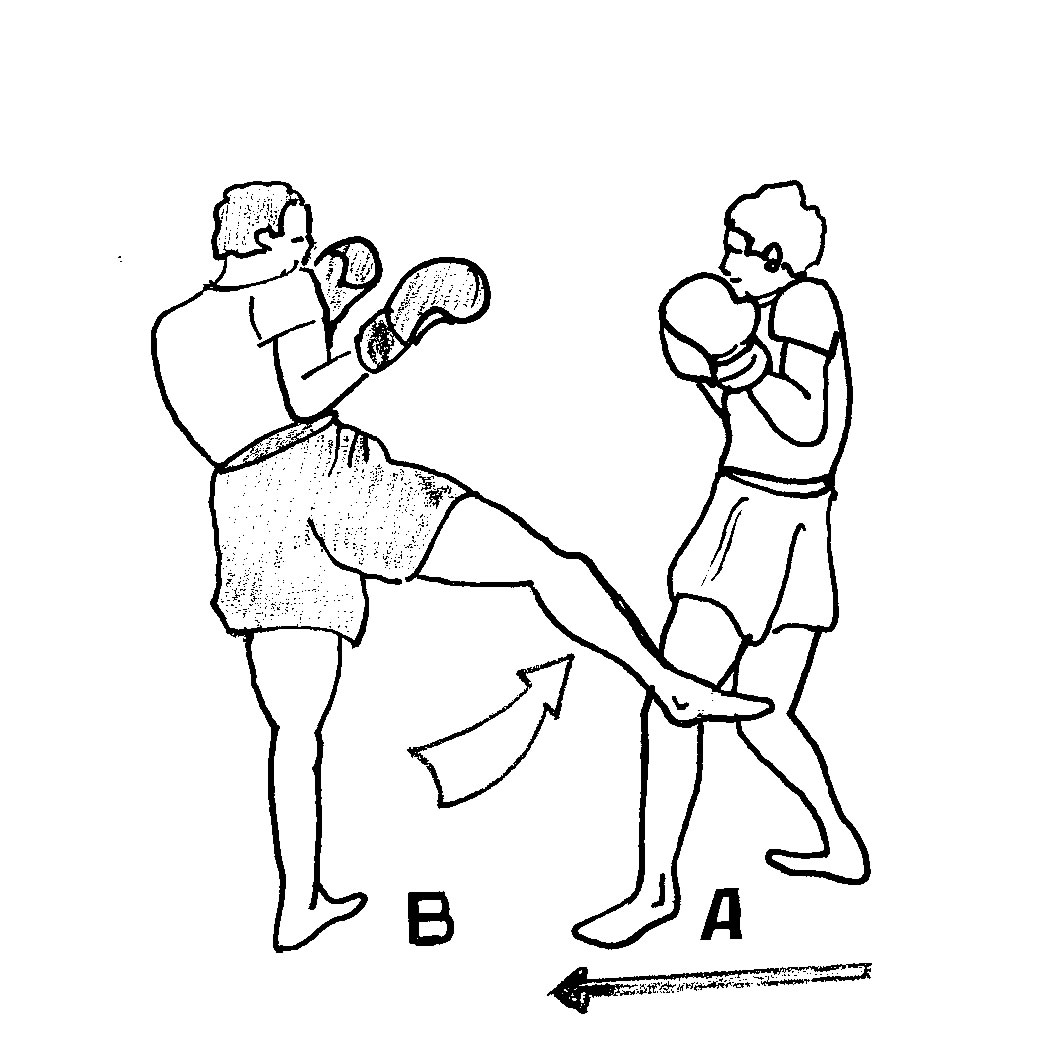
Low kick outside

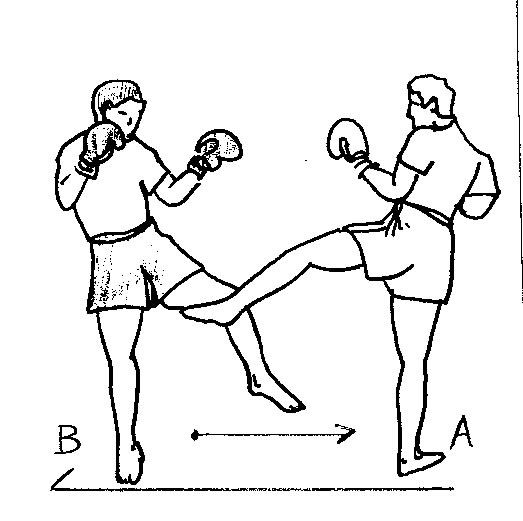
Low kick inside

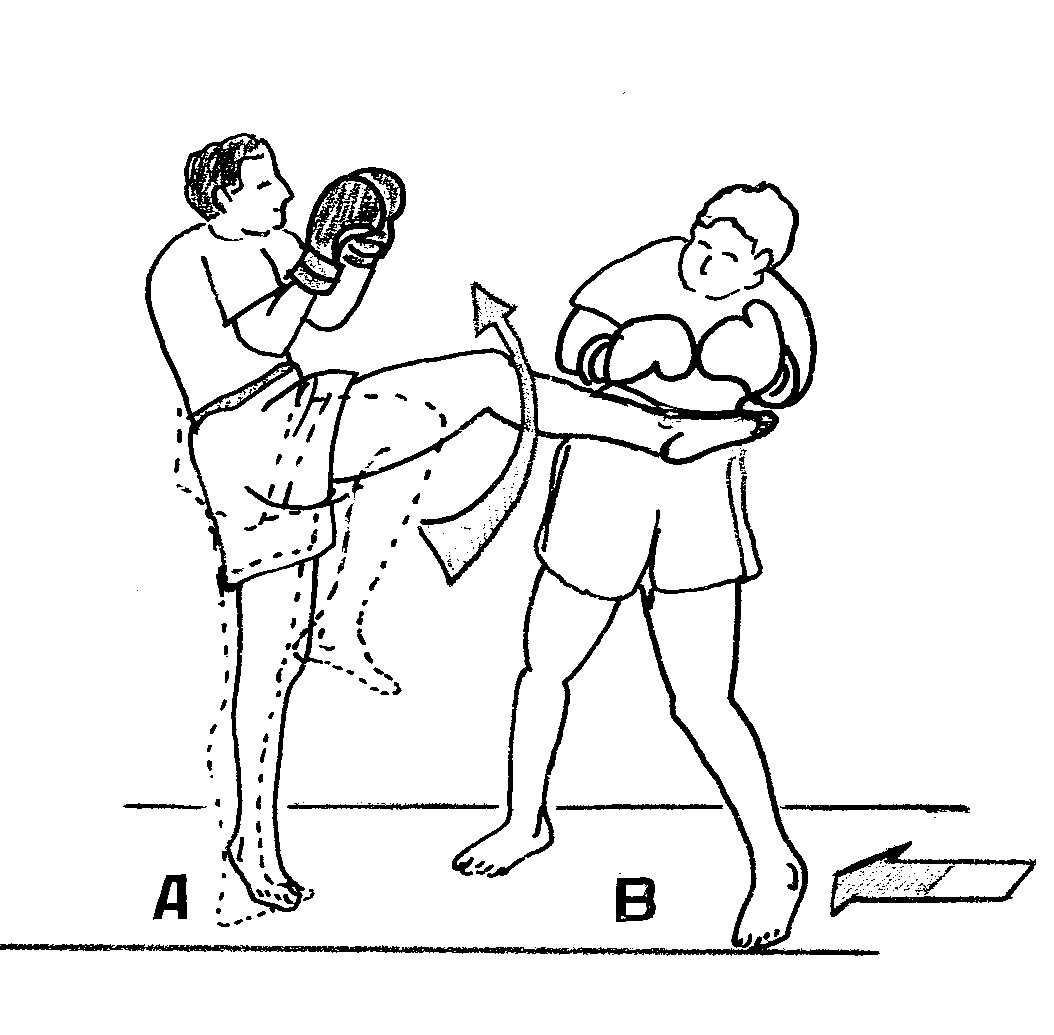
Middle kick

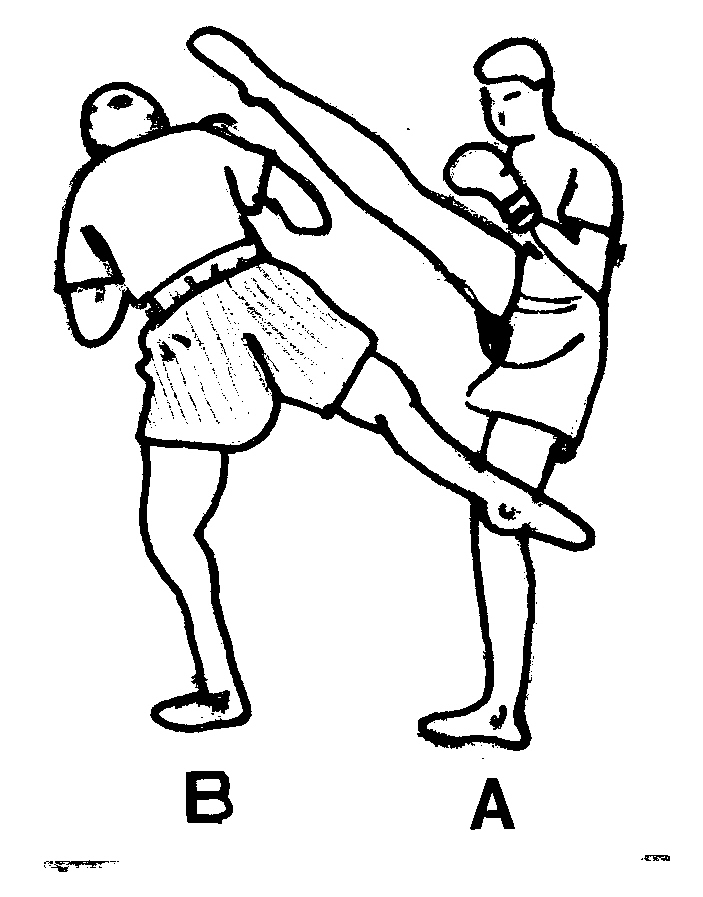
Low kick in counter

== Karate methods ==
Karate has many different methods of delivering the roundhouse kick (mawashi geri). The original method involved bringing up the knee, and then swiftly turning the hip over and snapping the leg outwards from the knee to deliver a strike with the ball of the foot. The ball of the foot was believed to be more effective and less dangerous than other methods.

As the years have gone by, some karate schools also practice kicking roundhouse kick with the shin, another point of contact is with the instep (for safety).

There are now more and more karateka practicing the 'cutting roundhouse kick'; this is where the karateka will lift the attacking leg higher than the intended target, and then execute the kick in a downward cutting movement. Practitioners consider it a very effective method against the thigh.

This was later supplemented in Masutatsu Oyama's Kyokushin karate with a similar technique, using the instep and using more rotation of the hip, as well as sinking the weight of the kicker into the target, to create more bludgeoning power. The target of this kick is primarily the neck. Oyama also taught roundhouse kicks to the thigh and ribs, using the shin as the point of contact.

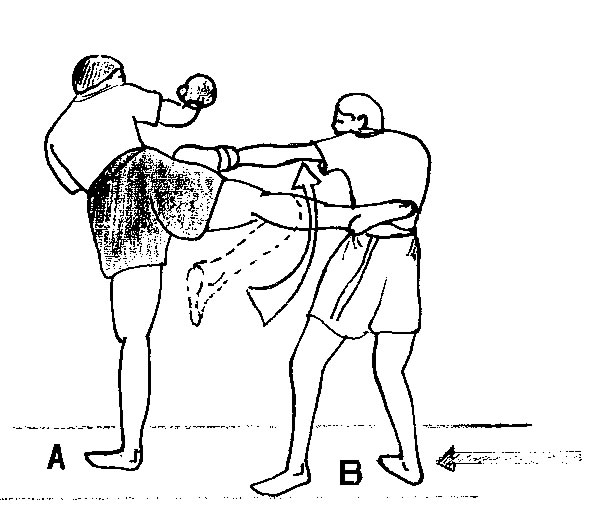
Middle-kick with rotation of the hips and body in the direction of the kick

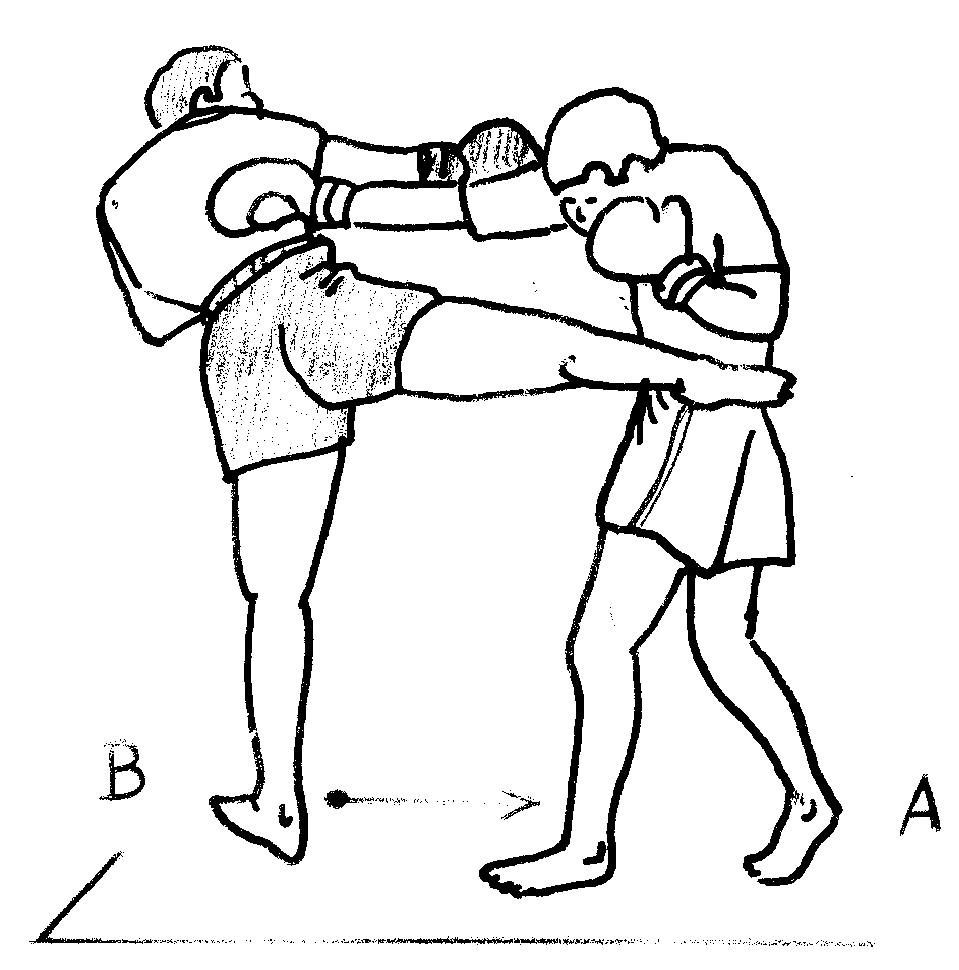
Middle-kick in counterattack

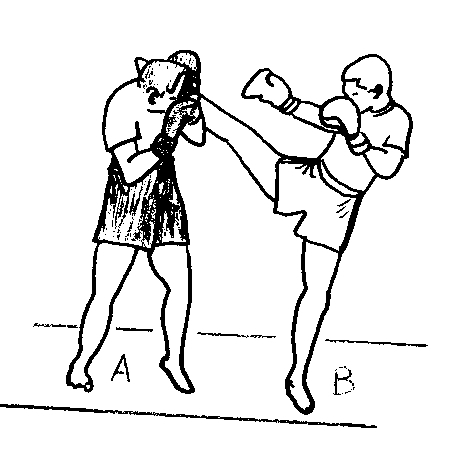
High-kick with the right leg

With the blurring of modern martial arts differences, many other variations of the roundhouse kick are now practiced in traditional karate schools. Besides the traditional Full Roundhouse Kick and the sports Small Roundhouse Kick variation, the kick sometimes uses the heel to connect (heel roundhouse kick). The Roundhouse kick is also often executed with a surprising downward tilt from high up, in what has been often called "the Brazilian kick" (downward roundhouse kick) because of influence from Brazilian Kyoukushin Karateka, such as Ademir de Costa, and notable students such as Glaube Feitosa and Francisco Filho. The kick is regularly practiced with a straight leg as a "low kick" because of muay Thai and kickboxing influences (straight leg roundhouse). The kick is also executed in several different ways after a full spin-back (spin back roundhouse kick and 360 spin back roundhouse kick), due to Taekwondo influences. It is executed with exaggerated tilt of the upper body (body bent roundhouse kick and hand-to-floor roundhouse kick), as derived from Capoeira influences.

== Muay Thai method ==
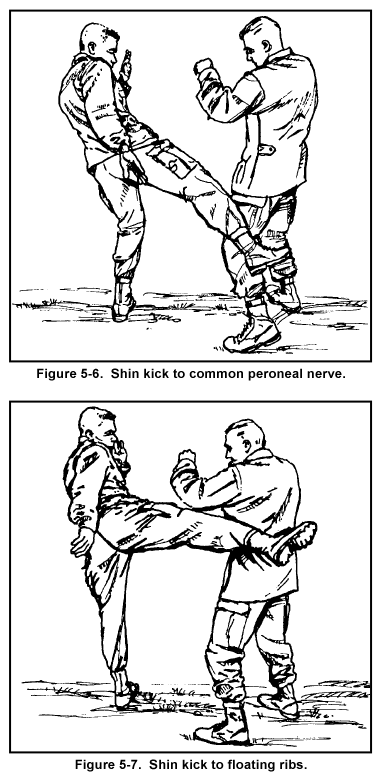
Thai-style roundhouse kicks used to attack low and middle targets

As with many other muay Thai techniques, the roundhouse kick has gained wide popularity, being used extensively in K-1 kickboxing and mixed martial arts (MMA) competitions due to its effectiveness in inflicting damage to the opponent. A properly executed muay Thai roundhouse kick has been compared by many martial artists to being struck by a baseball bat. Most Western muay Thai clubs and practitioners avoid the term roundhouse kick, instead using the term angle kick (or side-angle kick and occasionally rising kick).

The muay Thai roundhouse (or angle) kick is generally used in varying levels (low, middle, high) to inflict damage to different parts of the opponent's body. Low (or lowpoint) kicks generally target the thigh just above the knee joint for the purpose of weakening the leg, limiting the opponent's mobility, reducing their ability to use it for forceful kicks, or potentially rendering them unable to stand on the leg altogether. In more recent times many MMA fighters such as Justin Gaethje, Edson Barboza, Benson Henderson, and Jeremy Stephens utilize effective low kicks. This can target the peroneal nerve rendering the attacked leg numb and paralyzed.

Muay Thai practitioners are taught to repeatedly strike the same point on the thigh to increase the cumulative effect of low kicks as a match proceeds. Some Thai camps emphasize targeting the inner thigh to compress the femoral artery and to shock the opponent weakening their fighting ability. Middle (midpoint or midsection) kicks target the area above the hip bone and can damage the opponent's ribs and liver. High (or highpoint) kicks target the opponent's head or neck; they are often responsible for knockouts in competition. Some Thai camps emphasize targeting the side of the neck with the high angle kick cutting down from its highest point to compress the carotid artery and so shock the opponent, weakening their fighting ability or knocking him out.

There are several traits which give the muay Thai roundhouse a very different feel and look. The main methodological difference is that the hips are rotated into the kick in order to convey more moment of inertia in the kick, and the abdominal muscles are strongly recruited in the act of rotation. Instead of a snapping kick, the combined action of the leg and hips creates a kick that is much more devoted to its momentum. The person delivering the kick will also raise up on the ball of their foot while he or she kicks, mainly to allow for greater pivoting/turning speed, and increased power. Muay Thai roundhouse kicks use the shin to make contact with the target instead of the ball or instep. This further adds to the structure of the kick, as the shin is more durable than the foot. Using the shin reduces the kick's reach, but allows it to be thrown within punching range.

Virtually all muay Thai camps teach the roundhouse or angle kick with the striking leg remaining passive (mostly with the leg allowed to bend slightly but some camps teaching that the knee should be locked except to close range kicking) and not using the pivot of the lower striking leg around the knee found in most other martial arts. The power is instead entirely created by the rotation of the supporting leg and hips; akin to swinging a baseball bat.

The practical difference is the objective of the kick. A standard karate or taekwondo roundhouse kick has one snap the instep at the objective, but a Muay Thai roundhouse uses the combined momentum generated by the leg and hip for more power.

== Taekwondo method ==
The taekwondo roundhouse kick, known as dollyŏ chagi, is performed by first drawing the knee straight up in a "chamber" position. This chamber, identical to the chamber of many taekwondo kicks (front kick, side kick, etc.) is utilized so that the opponent cannot guess which kick will be thrown. This differentiates it from Muay Thai and other roundhouse kicks, which tend to incorporate rotation before or during the rising of the knee. The knee is then rotated so that it is nearly parallel to the ground (counterclockwise for the right leg roundhouse) and the kicking hip is simultaneously rotated towards the opponent. The rotation of the hip, combined with the snapping of the leg forward, gives the kick its power. The striking surface is the instep or the ball of the foot. In this way taekwondo differs from Chinese sanshou, where the striking surface is the shin. This is also called an "off the line" or "rear leg" roundhouse kick.

The roundhouse kick can also be thrown from the rear leg towards the target and strike with the lower shin or the instep. This method is to get a quick strike on the opponent before they see it coming. The kick is swung and then snapped in front of the practitioner to give them more power and velocity. The taekwondo kicking method is unique on its own. This makes the Taekwondo version of the kick much faster than the Muay Thai version.

A similar kick is the front leg roundhouse, or "fast kick." To begin the front leg roundhouse kick, the leading leg is chambered, then rotated and snapped towards the opponent in the manner described above. The fast kick version is done by skipping forward with the rear leg, moving the kicker towards the opponent while simultaneously chambering and snapping the front leg roundhouse. This method was used by early American full-contact karateka Bill Wallace, a student of taekwondo as well as karate, to great effect. The front leg kick is generally weaker than the rear leg roundhouse because the hip does not rotate as far; however, it is also generally faster because the leg travels a shorter distance before striking the opponent.

== Chinese wushu: sanshou/sanda method ==
The variation of the "roundhouse kick" or 鞭腿 found in Chinese wushu's full contact portion of sanshou/sanda impacts with the ankle or instep.

Description:

- Lift the knee and let the foot follow.
- Standing leg: Twist on the ball of the foot, until the toes point away from one's opponent.
- Kick: Extend hip and hit opponent with straightened instep of foot.
- Pull the foot back in a straight line, so that your opponent can't grab your leg.

== Name by martial art ==
The same or a similar move can receive different names according to the martial art.

- Karate: Mawashi geri (回し蹴り)
- Muay Thai: Te Tat (เตะตัด); also known as "angle kick", "side-angle kick", or "rising kick"
- Lethwei: Wide Khat (ဝိုက်ခတ်)
- Capoeira: Martelo, or literally "hammer"
- Jeet Kune Do: O'ou tek or "hook kick"
- Taekwondo: Dollyŏ Chagi (돌려 차기), "Turning kick" or "Round kick"
- Kūdō: is called mawashi Geri, but is more like a muay Thai kick
- Savate: Fouetté or literally "whip"
- Sanshou: Pinyin: Bian1 Tui3 Traditional-Chinese: 鞭腿
- Yaw-Yan: Toblis Paloob Pataas
- Kuk Sool Won: Bahl Deung Cha Ki (발등 차기 - instep kick)

== In other sports ==
Daniel Bryan executes roundhouse kicks to Triple H's chest.

Roundhouse kicks are utilized a lot in puroresu competition; better known as Japanese professional wrestling. Many of the athletes have knowledge in striking sports and tend to have the roundhouse kick in their wrestling style. Toshiaki Kawada is known for his extremely hard hitting roundhouse kicks. KENTA is known for his powerful roundhouse kicks to the head and chest of his opponents. Takashi Sugiura often uses low roundhouse kicks to the back of his opponent. It is often utilized in shoot-style wrestling competition, leading to variants being called shoot kicks.

== See also ==
- Lethwei
- Reverse roundhouse kick
- Jean-Claude Van Damme
- Chuck Norris
