= Mawashi geri =

Kick used in Japanese martial arts

Korean name
- Hangul: 돌려 차기
Transcriptions
- Revised Romanization: dollyeo chagi
- McCune–Reischauer: tollyŏ ch'aki

Japanese name
- Kanji: 回し蹴り
- Hiragana: まわしげり
Transcriptions
- Revised Hepburn: mawashi-geri
- Kunrei-shiki: mawasi-geri

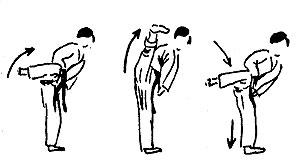
Mawashi geri

Mawashi geri (回し蹴り) can be translated as "spin kick", although it is also sometimes referred to as a roundhouse kick. It is a kick used in Japanese martial arts.

== Technique ==
Mawashi geri may be executed from a variety of stances, and there are several methods of proper execution. Technique is mainly used in Karate, Jujutsu, Kenpo etc. The portion of its execution that is always consistent is that the kick is executed inward and at an angle that is anywhere from parallel to the floor to 45 degrees upward. In general, it is a lateral kick that strikes with the foot. Ideally, the foot that is on the ground during the kick points directly away from the opponent, but 90 to 45 degrees away from the opponent may also be acceptable.

=== Variations ===
If mawashi geri is being thrown with the lead leg, the lead leg comes straight up from the ground, moving into a position with the knee bent back and pointing at the desired target area on the opponent. Without stopping, the upper leg rotates inward to whatever angle the kick will be thrown at, and finally, the lower leg flicks out to strike the opponent, and then immediately back in.

If the kick is being thrown from the rear leg, another option is available. The rear leg lifts with the knee bent and pointing to the side, and the entire body rotates as the knee swings around to the front (picture swinging one's leg over to mount a bicycle). The rotation of the body and lateral movement of the leg add to the momentum of the lower leg, which moves in and out the same as above.

The final possible variation is in the foot, itself. One may either strike with the instep of the foot (with the ankle and toes extended), or with the ball of the foot (ankle and toes bent back). Alternately, one could forgo the use of the foot entirely, and strike with the shin instead.

== Targets ==
Common targets for this kick include the head (especially in competition), as well as the knees and floating ribs. Kyokushinkai karate practitioners commonly use low mawashi geri attacks to strike the thigh of opponents whereas this move is less common in other styles.

There are many versions of roundhouse kick.

Martial arts have many different methods of delivering a roundhouse kick. One method involved bringing up the knee, and then swiftly turning the hip over and snapping the leg outwards from the knee to deliver a strike with the ball of the foot.

As the years have gone by, some martial arts schools also practice kicking roundhouse kick with the shin, which has always been the preferred method of Muay Thai.

Another popular point of contact is with the instep, which, for safety reasons, is usually practiced when sparring in the martial arts school.

There are now more and more martial artists practicing the 'cutting roundhouse kick', this is where the practitioner will lift their attacking leg higher than the intended target, they will then execute the kick in a downward cutting movement. It is an effective attack against the thigh.
