= Soto uke =

Karate blocking technique

Japanese name
- Kanji: 外受け
Transcriptions
- Revised Hepburn: Soto uke

In Shotokan karate, soto uke is a blocking technique used for blocking mid-level incoming attacks. It is roughly translated as "From outside block", similar to Osotogari (leg throw from the outside), which comes from the block's final resting point centered on the blocker's body. The opposite of soto uke is uchi uke ("From inside block").

Soto uke is performed by bringing one hand to the ear, keeping the elbow raised, and sweeping the arm down and out towards the center of the body. The preparatory step of raising the arm gives the block more momentum, making it somewhat painful to encounter. A different application involves extending the non-blocking hand in front before performing the block. This represents grabbing the attacker's arm. The motion termed the block, then, is actually meant to break the arm, which would explain the necessity of the extra momentum.

The above designations are particular to Shotokan and some other schools, and are backwards from other systems (Wado-ryu, Doshinkan, Uechi-Ryu, etc.) where soto uke is a block to the outside and uchi uke is a block to the inside — consistent with Gedan Barai is a block in the downward direction and Jodan Age Uke is a block in the upwards direction. This doesn't mean one designation is wrong, just that there is a difference depending on the school.

== See also ==
- List of Shotokan techniques
