= Toyotaro Miyazaki =

Japanese martial artist (1944–2021)

- Born: September 25, 1944; Tokyo, Japan
- Died: August 11, 2021 (aged 76); Japan
- Nationality: Japanese
- Style: Karate; Shotokan
- Teacher: Tomasaburo Okano
- Rank: 8th Dan Black Belt
- Years active: 1959 - 1971 (competition)

Other information
- Notable students: Kai Leung, George Aschkar, Shihan Gustavo Larrea, Jorge Decena, Nixon Feliz, Vincent Riqueros, Ian Rugel, Victor Garrido, Beatriz Elster, Gabriel Trance
- Last updated on: 2024-12-16

Toyotaro Miyazaki (September 25, 1944 – August 11, 2021) was a Japanese karate master, competitor, and instructor of Kenkojuku‑style Shotokan Karate. After moving to the United States in 1966, he became one of the most successful and influential karate competitors of the late 1960s and early 1970s, appearing on the covers of Black Belt, Karate Illustrated, and Official Karate. Miyazaki later became a prominent instructor in New York, where he taught for more than four decades and produced hundreds of black belts.

== Early life and education ==
Toyotaro Miyazaki was born on September 25, 1944, in Tokyo, Japan. He studied economics in college before emigrating to the United States in 1966.

Miyazaki began training in karate at age 15 at the Kenkojuku Dojo under Tomasaburo Okano, a direct student of Gichin Funakoshi, the founder of Shotokan Karate.

He trained intensively in the Kenkojuku branch of Shotokan until his mid‑twenties, earning high rank before leaving Japan.

== Karate Career in the United States ==
=== Competition Success ===
After arriving in the United States, Miyazaki quickly became known for his skill in both kata (forms) and kumite (sparring). He competed against many of the top American fighters of the era, including:

- Dwight Frazier
- Grant Campbell
- Kevin Thompson

Miyazaki maintained a Top 10 national ranking for nearly two decades, making him one of the most consistently successful competitors of his generation.

His prominence led to multiple magazine covers, including:

- Black Belt Magazine
- Karate Illustrated
- Official Karate Magazine

He retired from active competition in 1971.

=== Recognition by Peers ===
Chuck Norris described Miyazaki as "one of the toughest opponents he ever faced", a testament to Miyazaki’s technical precision and fighting spirit.

=== Teaching Career ===
==== Tokutai Karate‑Do and New York Dojos ====
Miyazaki served as the head instructor of Tokutai Karate‑Do, continuing the Kenkojuku Shotokan lineage in the United States.

He later established a dojo in Flushing, Queens, which operated for more than 40 years. Over the course of his teaching career, he trained thousands of students and produced hundreds of black belts, many of whom went on to open their own schools.

==== University Instruction ====
Miyazaki also taught at Long Island University, where he served as an instructor in the university’s Karate Instructor Certification Program.

==== Notable Students ====
Miyazaki’s students include several prominent martial artists, instructors, and authors:

- Kai Leung, founder of Shotojuku Karate‑Do
- George Aschkar, competitor and instructor
- Gustavo Larrea, Shihan
- Jorge Decena
- Nixon Feliz
- Vincent Riqueros
- Ian Rugel, 9th dan (Ecuador)
- Victor Garrido, 7th dan, International Shotokai Federation
- Beatriz Elster, 5th dan and author
- Gabriel Trance, 5th dan, later founder of a dojo in Tumwater, Washington

== Death ==
Toyotaro Miyazaki died on "August 11, 2021", while residing in Japan.

== Legacy ==
Miyazaki is remembered as:

- One of the most successful Japanese competitors to establish a career in the United States
- A major figure in the spread of Kenkojuku Shotokan Karate
- A teacher whose influence extends internationally through his students
- A competitor respected by peers such as Chuck Norris and Kevin Thompson

His blend of traditional Japanese training and American competitive experience helped shape the development of karate in the United States during the 1960s–1990s.

"References" 1. *Black Belt Magazine*, June 1979. 2. Bustillo, Antonio. *Steady Training*. iUniverse, 2001. 3. “History of Karate of Lineage.” USKDA.com. 4. *Black Belt Magazine*, December 1969. 5. “Master Kevin Thompson Interview.” *MartialForce.com*, 2013. 6. Bustillo, Antonio. *Steady Training*. iUniverse, 2001. 7. “Shihan Kai Leung.” Shotojuku.com. 8. “Interview with George Aschkar.” *MartialForce.com*. 9. “Victor Garrido Sensei.” victorgarridosensei.com. 10. Martinez, Beatriz. *Powerful Senior Karate*. CreateSpace, 2015. 11. Martinez, Beatriz Elster. *El Arte de Enseñar Karate‑Do*. CreateSpace, 2017.
