= Borji-ye Kheyl =

Village in Mazandaran province, Iran

Borji-ye Kheyl Persian: برجي خيل
- Village
- Location within Iran
- Coordinates: 36°36′35″N 52°45′57″E
- Country: Iran
- Province: Mazandaran
- County: Simorgh
- District: Central
- Rural District: Dasht-e Kenar

Population (2016)
  - Total: 391
- Time zone: UTC+3:30 (IRST)

Borji-ye Kheyl (Persian: برجي خيل) (Note: Also romanized as Borjī-ye Kheyl; also known as Borj-e Kheyl) is a village in Dasht-e Kenar Rural District of the Central District in Simorgh County, Mazandaran province, Iran.

== Demographics ==
=== Population ===
At the time of the 2006 National Census, the village's population was 350 in 85 households, when it was in Kiakola Rural District of the former Kiakola District in Qaem Shahr County. The following census in 2011 counted 361 people in 102 households. The 2016 census measured the population of the village as 391 people in 137 households, by which time the district had been separated from the county in the establishment of Simorgh County. The rural district was transferred to the new Central District, and the village was transferred to Dasht-e Kenar Rural District created in the same district.
