= Tan Bela =

Village in Mazandaran province, Iran

Tan Bela Persian: تنبلا
- Village
- Location within Iran
- Coordinates: 36°37′25″N 52°47′31″E
- Country: Iran
- Province: Mazandaran
- County: Simorgh
- District: Central
- Rural District: Dasht-e Kenar

Population (2016)
  - Total: 472
- Time zone: UTC+3:30 (IRST)

Tan Bela (Persian: تنبلا) (Note: Also romanized as Tan Belā and Tonbolā) is a village in Dasht-e Kenar Rural District of the Central District in Simorgh County, Mazandaran province, Iran.

== Demographics ==
=== Population ===
At the time of the 2006 National Census, the village's population was 406 in 104 households, when it was in Kiakola Rural District of the former Kiakola District in Qaem Shahr County. The following census in 2011 counted 394 people in 115 households. The 2016 census measured the population of the village as 472 people in 168 households, by which time the district had been separated from the county in the establishment of Simorgh County. The rural district was transferred to the new Central District, and the village was transferred to Dasht-e Kenar Rural District created in the same district. Tan Bela was the most populous village in its rural district.
