= Selehdar Kola =

Village in Mazandaran province, Iran

Selehdar Kola Persian: صلحداركلا
- Village
- Location within Iran
- Coordinates: 36°32′52″N 52°52′51″E
- Country: Iran
- Province: Mazandaran
- County: Simorgh
- District: Talarpey
- Rural District: Tur

Population (2016)
  - Total: 163
- Time zone: UTC+3:30 (IRST)

Selehdar Kola (Persian: صلحداركلا) (Note: Also romanized as Şeleḩdār Kolā) is a village in Tur Rural District of Talarpey District in Simorgh County, Mazandaran province, Iran.

== Demographics ==
=== Population ===
At the time of the 2006 National Census, the village's population was 112 in 28 households, when it was in Talarpey Rural District of the former Kiakola District in Qaem Shahr County. The following census in 2011 counted 130 people in 40 households. The 2016 census measured the population of the village as 163 people in 63 households, by which time the district had been separated from the county in the establishment of Simorgh County. The rural district was transferred to the new Talarpey District, and the village was transferred to Tur Rural District created in the same district.
