= Dineh Sar-e Rakan Kola =

Village in Mazandaran province, Iran

Dineh Sar-e Rakan Kola Persian: دينه سرركن كلا
- Village
- Location within Iran
- Coordinates: 36°37′22″N 52°46′05″E
- Country: Iran
- Province: Mazandaran
- County: Simorgh
- District: Central
- Rural District: Dasht-e Kenar

Population (2016)
  - Total: 330
- Time zone: UTC+3:30 (IRST)

Dineh Sar-e Rakan Kola (Persian: دينه سرركن كلا) (Note: Also romanized as Dīneh Sar-e Rakan Kolā; also known as Dīneh Sar) is a village in Dasht-e Kenar Rural District of the Central District in Simorgh County, Mazandaran province, Iran.

== Demographics ==
=== Population ===
At the time of the 2006 National Census, the village's population was 298 in 75 households, when it was in Kiakola Rural District of the former Kiakola District in Qaem Shahr County. The following census in 2011 counted 330 people in 111 households. The 2016 census measured the population of the village as 330 people in 122 households, by which time the district had been separated from the county in the establishment of Simorgh County. The rural district was transferred to the new Central District, and the village was transferred to Dasht-e Kenar Rural District created in the same district.
