= Jamal Kola =

Village in Mazandaran province, Iran

Jamal Kola Persian: جمال كلا
- Village
- Location within Iran
- Coordinates: 36°36′52″N 52°49′15″E
- Country: Iran
- Province: Mazandaran
- County: Simorgh
- District: Central
- Rural District: Dasht-e Kenar

Population (2016)
  - Total: 201
- Time zone: UTC+3:30 (IRST)

Jamal Kola (Persian: جمال كلا) (Note: Also romanized as Jamāl Kalā and Jamāl Kolā) is a village in Dasht-e Kenar Rural District of the Central District in Simorgh County, Mazandaran province, Iran.

== Demographics ==
=== Population ===
At the time of the 2006 National Census, the village's population was 184 in 53 households, when it was in Kiakola Rural District of the former Kiakola District in Qaem Shahr County. The following census in 2011 counted 168 people in 58 households. The 2016 census measured the population of the village as 201 people in 70 households, by which time the district had been separated from the county in the establishment of Simorgh County. The rural district was transferred to the new Central District, and the village was transferred to Dasht-e Kenar Rural District created in the same district.
