= Kartij Kola =

Village in Mazandaran province, Iran

Kartij Kola Persian: كارتيج كلا
- Village
- Location within Iran
- Coordinates: 36°33′25″N 52°49′42″E
- Country: Iran
- Province: Mazandaran
- County: Simorgh
- District: Talarpey
- Rural District: Tur

Population (2016)
  - Total: 495
- Time zone: UTC+3:30 (IRST)

Kartij Kola (Persian: كارتيج كلا) (Note: Also romanized as Kārtīj Kolā and Kartīj Kolā) is a village in Tur Rural District of Talarpey District in Simorgh County, Mazandaran province, Iran.

== Demographics ==
=== Population ===
At the time of the 2006 National Census, the village's population was 504 in 142 households, when it was in Talarpey Rural District of the former Kiakola District in Qaem Shahr County. The following census in 2011 counted 463 people in 137 households. The 2016 census measured the population of the village as 495 people in 168 households, by which time the district had been separated from the county in the establishment of Simorgh County. The rural district was transferred to the new Talarpey District, and the village was transferred to Tur Rural District created in the same district.
