= Pahnaji =

Village in Mazandaran province, Iran

Pahnaji Persian: پهناجي
- Village
- Location within Iran
- Coordinates: 36°37′14″N 52°48′31″E
- Country: Iran
- Province: Mazandaran
- County: Simorgh
- District: Central
- Rural District: Dasht-e Kenar

Population (2016)
  - Total: 270
- Time zone: UTC+3:30 (IRST)

Pahnaji (Persian: پهناجي) (Note: Also romanized as Pahnājī; also known as Pahn Ḩājī and Pahn Ḩājjī) is a village in Dasht-e Kenar Rural District of the Central District in Simorgh County, Mazandaran province, Iran.

== Demographics ==
=== Population ===
At the time of the 2006 National Census, the village's population was 188 in 55 households, when it was in Kiakola Rural District of the former Kiakola District in Qaem Shahr County. The following census in 2011 counted 232 people in 71 households. The 2016 census measured the population of the village as 270 people in 92 households, by which time the district had been separated from the county in the establishment of Simorgh County. The rural district was transferred to the new Central District, and the village was transferred to Dasht-e Kenar Rural District created in the same district.
