= Gushti Kola =

Village in Mazandaran province, Iran

Gushti Kola Persian: گوشتي كلا
- Village
- Location within Iran
- Coordinates: 36°32′01″N 52°49′47″E
- Country: Iran
- Province: Mazandaran
- County: Simorgh
- District: Talarpey
- Rural District: Tur

Population (2016)
  - Total: 31
- Time zone: UTC+3:30 (IRST)

Gushti Kola (Persian: گوشتي كلا) (Note: Also romanized as Gūshtī Kolā) is a village in Tur Rural District of Talarpey District in Simorgh County, Mazandaran province, Iran.

== Demographics ==
=== Population ===
At the time of the 2006 National Census, the village's population was 28 in nine households, when it was in Talarpey Rural District of the former Kiakola District in Qaem Shahr County. The following census in 2011 counted 25 people in eight households. The 2016 census measured the population of the village as 31 people in 14 households, by which time the district had been separated from the county in the establishment of Simorgh County. The rural district was transferred to the new Talarpey District, and the village was transferred to Tur Rural District created in the same district.
