= Shir Khvar Kola =

Village in Mazandaran province, Iran

Shir Khvar Kola Persian: شيرخواركلا
- Village
- Location within Iran
- Coordinates: 36°33′20″N 52°51′26″E
- Country: Iran
- Province: Mazandaran
- County: Simorgh
- District: Talarpey
- Rural District: Tur

Population (2016)
  - Total: 534
- Time zone: UTC+3:30 (IRST)

Shir Khvar Kola (Persian: شيرخواركلا) (Note: Also romanized as Shīr Khvar Kalā, Shīr Khvār Kolā, and Shīr Khvar Kolā) is a village in Tur Rural District of Talarpey District in Simorgh County, Mazandaran province, Iran.

== Demographics ==
=== Population ===
At the time of the 2006 National Census, the village's population was 555 in 147 households, when it was in Talarpey Rural District of the former Kiakola District in Qaem Shahr County. The following census in 2011 counted 542 people in 172 households. The 2016 census measured the population of the village as 534 people in 189 households, by which time the district had been separated from the county in the establishment of Simorgh County. The rural district was transferred to the new Talarpey District, and the village was transferred to Tur Rural District created in the same district.
