= Kharrat Kola, Simorgh =

Village in Mazandaran province, Iran

Kharrat Kola Persian: خراطكلا
- Village
- Location within Iran
- Coordinates: 36°33′02″N 52°49′23″E
- Country: Iran
- Province: Mazandaran
- County: Simorgh
- District: Talarpey
- Rural District: Tur

Population (2016)
  - Total: 306
- Time zone: UTC+3:30 (IRST)

Kharrat Kola (Persian: خراطكلا) (Note: Also romanized as Kharrāţ Kolā and Kharrāt Kolā) is a village in, and the capital of, Tur Rural District in Talarpey District of Simorgh County, Mazandaran province, Iran.

== Demographics ==
=== Population ===
At the time of the 2006 National Census, the village's population was 278 in 72 households, when it was in Talarpey Rural District of the former Kiakola District in Qaem Shahr County. The following census in 2011 counted 277 people in 77 households. The 2016 census measured the population of the village as 306 people in 106 households, by which time the district had been separated from the county in the establishment of Simorgh County. The rural district was transferred to the new Talarpey District, and Kharrat Kola was transferred to Tur Rural District created in the same district.
