= Laleh Zar Koti =

Village in Mazandaran province, Iran

Laleh Zar Koti Persian: لاله زاركتي
- Village
- Location within Iran
- Coordinates: 36°33′04″N 52°52′22″E
- Country: Iran
- Province: Mazandaran
- County: Simorgh
- District: Talarpey
- Rural District: Tur

Population (2016)
  - Total: 63
- Time zone: UTC+3:30 (IRST)

Laleh Zar Koti (Persian: لاله زاركتي) (Note: Also romanized as Lāleh Zār Kotī) is a village in Tur Rural District of Talarpey District in Simorgh County, Mazandaran province, Iran.

== Demographics ==
=== Population ===
At the time of the 2006 National Census, the village's population was 38 in 14 households, when it was in Talarpey Rural District of the former Kiakola District in Qaem Shahr County. The following census in 2011 counted 23 people in six households. The 2016 census measured the population of the village as 63 people in 22 households, by which time the district had been separated from the county in the establishment of Simorgh County. The rural district was transferred to the new Talarpey District, and the village was transferred to Tur Rural District created in the same district.
