= Pain Dasteh-ye Rakan Kola =

Village in Mazandaran province, Iran

Pain Dasteh-ye Rakan Kola Persian: پايين دسته ركن كلا
- Village
- Location within Iran
- Coordinates: 36°36′27″N 52°47′42″E
- Country: Iran
- Province: Mazandaran
- County: Simorgh
- District: Central
- Rural District: Dasht-e Kenar

Population (2016)
  - Total: 443
- Time zone: UTC+3:30 (IRST)

Pain Dasteh-ye Rakan Kola (Persian: پايين دسته ركن كلا) (Note: Also romanized as Pā’īn Dasteh-ye Rakan Kolā; also known as Āzād Maḩalleh and Pā’īn Dasteh) is a village in, and the capital of, Dasht-e Kenar Rural District in the Central District of Simorgh County, Mazandaran province, Iran.

== Demographics ==
=== Population ===
At the time of the 2006 National Census, the village's population was 436 in 113 households, when it was in Kiakola Rural District of the former Kiakola District in Qaem Shahr County. The following census in 2011 counted 457 people in 137 households. The 2016 census measured the population of the village as 443 people in 160 households, by which time the district had been separated from the county in the establishment of Simorgh County. The rural district was transferred to the new Central District, and the village was transferred to Dasht-e Kenar Rural District created in the same district.
