= Akhteh Chi =

Village in Mazandaran province, Iran

Akhteh Chi Persian: اخته چي
- Village
- Location within Iran
- Coordinates: 36°32′26″N 52°48′58″E
- Country: Iran
- Province: Mazandaran
- County: Simorgh
- District: Talarpey
- Rural District: Tur

Population (2016)
  - Total: 337
- Time zone: UTC+3:30 (IRST)

Akhteh Chi (Persian: اخته چي) (Note: Also romanized as Akhteh Chī and Akhtehchī) is a village in Tur Rural District of Talarpey District in Simorgh County, Mazandaran province, Iran.

== Demographics ==
=== Population ===
At the time of the 2006 National Census, the village's population was 445 in 116 households, when it was in Talarpey Rural District of the former Kiakola District in Qaem Shahr County. The following census in 2011 counted 351 people in 109 households. The 2016 census measured the population of the village as 337 people in 119 households, by which time the district had been separated from the county in the establishment of Simorgh County. The rural district was transferred to the new Talarpey District, and the village was transferred to Tur Rural District created in the same district.
