= Ahangar Kola, Simorgh =

Village in Mazandaran province, Iran

Ahangar Kola Persian: اهنگركلا
- Village
- Location within Iran
- Coordinates: 36°33′N 52°46′E
- Country: Iran
- Province: Mazandaran
- County: Simorgh
- District: Talarpey
- Rural District: Talarpey

Population (2016)
  - Total: 58
- Time zone: UTC+3:30 (IRST)

Ahangar Kola (Persian: اهنگركلا) (Note: Also romanized as Āhangar Kolā) is a village in Talarpey Rural District of Talarpey District in Simorgh County, Mazandaran province, Iran.

== Demographics ==
=== Population ===
At the time of the 2006 National Census, the village's population was 38 in 11 households, when it was in the former Kiakola District of Qaem Shahr County. The following census in 2011 counted 52 people in 15 households. The 2016 census measured the population of the village as 58 people in 22 households, by which time the district had been separated from the county in the establishment of Simorgh County. The rural district was transferred to the new Talarpey District.
