= Salduz Kola-ye Bala =

Village in Mazandaran province, Iran

Salduz Kola-ye Bala Persian: سالدوزكلابالا
- Village
- Location within Iran
- Coordinates: 36°34′12″N 52°47′39″E
- Country: Iran
- Province: Mazandaran
- County: Simorgh
- District: Talarpey
- Rural District: Talarpey

Population (2016)
  - Total: 229
- Time zone: UTC+3:30 (IRST)

Salduz Kola-ye Bala (Persian: سالدوزكلابالا) (Note: Also romanized as Sāldūz Kolā-ye Bālā) is a village in Talarpey Rural District of Talarpey District in Simorgh County, Mazandaran province, Iran.

== Demographics ==
=== Population ===
At the time of the 2006 National Census, the village's population was 240 in 59 households, when it was in the former Kiakola District of Qaem Shahr County. The following census in 2011 counted 242 people in 70 households. The 2016 census measured the population of the village as 229 people in 74 households, by which time the district had been separated from the county in the establishment of Simorgh County. The rural district was transferred to the new Talarpey District.
