= Gushi =

Gushi may refer to:

- Gushi County (固始县), Henan, China
- Güshi Khan (1582–1655), ruler of the Khoshut Mongols
- Jushi Kingdom or Gushi (姑師), ancient kingdom in Turpan, Xinjiang, China
- Gushi (poetry) (古詩), Chinese verse form
- Gushi Hui, a Chinese literary magazine
- Gushi Kola
- Gushi Shinyu, 10th Dan Uechi-Ryū Master
- Helena Gushi Kadare (born 1943), Albanian author
