= Ziar Kola, Simorgh =

Village in Mazandaran province, Iran

Ziar Kola Persian: زياركلا
- Village
- Location within Iran
- Coordinates: 36°32′45″N 52°51′36″E
- Country: Iran
- Province: Mazandaran
- County: Simorgh
- District: Talarpey
- Rural District: Tur

Population (2016)
  - Total: 704
- Time zone: UTC+3:30 (IRST)

Ziar Kola (Persian: زياركلا) (Note: Also romanized as Zīār Kolā) is a village in Tur Rural District of Talarpey District in Simorgh County, Mazandaran province, Iran.

== Demographics ==
=== Population ===
At the time of the 2006 National Census, the village's population was 629 in 169 households, when it was in Talarpey Rural District of the former Kiakola District in Qaem Shahr County. The following census in 2011 counted 625 people in 208 households. The 2016 census measured the population of the village as 704 people in 260 households, by which time the district had been separated from the county in the establishment of Simorgh County. The rural district was transferred to the new Talarpey District, and the village was transferred to Tur Rural District created in the same district. Ziar Kola was the most populous village in its rural district.
