= Molla Kola, Simorgh =

Village in Mazandaran province, Iran

Molla Kola Persian: ملاكلا
- Village
- Location within Iran
- Coordinates: 36°35′20″N 52°46′35″E
- Country: Iran
- Province: Mazandaran
- County: Simorgh
- District: Central
- Rural District: Kiakola

Population (2016)
  - Total: 922
- Time zone: UTC+3:30 (IRST)

Molla Kola (Persian: ملاكلا) (Note: Also romanized as Mollā Kalā and Mollā Kolā) is a village in Kiakola Rural District of the Central District in Simorgh County, Mazandaran province, Iran.

== Demographics ==
=== Population ===
At the time of the 2006 National Census, the village's population was 829 in 206 households, when it was in the former Kiakola District of Qaem Shahr County. The following census in 2011 counted 881 people in 274 households. The 2016 census measured the population of the village as 922 people in 299 households, by which time the district had been separated from the county in the establishment of Simorgh County. The rural district was transferred to the new Central District.
