= Meri, Mazandaran =

Village in Mazandaran province, Iran

Meri Persian: مري
- Village
- Location within Iran
- Coordinates: 36°33′18″N 52°47′48″E
- Country: Iran
- Province: Mazandaran
- County: Simorgh
- District: Talarpey
- Rural District: Talarpey

Population (2016)
  - Total: 450
- Time zone: UTC+3:30 (IRST)

Meri (Persian: مري) (Note: Also romanized as Mari, Marī, and Merī) is a village in Talarpey Rural District of Talarpey District in Simorgh County, Mazandaran province, Iran.

== Demographics ==
=== Population ===
At the time of the 2006 National Census, the village's population was 675 in 176 households, when it was in the former Kiakola District of Qaem Shahr County. The following census in 2011 counted 481 people in 143 households. The 2016 census measured the population of the village as 450 people in 144 households, by which time the district had been separated from the county in the establishment of Simorgh County. The rural district was transferred to the new Talarpey District.
