= Samna Kola =

Village in Mazandaran province, Iran

Samna Kola Persian: سمناكلا
- Village
- Location within Iran
- Coordinates: 36°32′31″N 52°48′22″E
- Country: Iran
- Province: Mazandaran
- County: Simorgh
- District: Talarpey
- Rural District: Talarpey

Population (2016)
  - Total: 243
- Time zone: UTC+3:30 (IRST)

Samna Kola (Persian: سمناكلا) (Note: Also romanized as Samnā Kolā) is a village in Talarpey Rural District of Talarpey District in Simorgh County, Mazandaran province, Iran.

== Demographics ==
=== Population ===
At the time of the 2006 National Census, the village's population was 208 in 55 households, when it was in the former Kiakola District of Qaem Shahr County. The following census in 2011 counted 175 people in 64 households. The 2016 census measured the population of the village as 243 people in 85 households, by which time the district had been separated from the county in the establishment of Simorgh County. The rural district was transferred to the new Talarpey District.
