= Musa Kola, Simorgh =

Village in Mazandaran province, Iran

Qajar Tappeh Persian: موسي كلا
- Village
- Location within Iran
- Coordinates: 36°34′08″N 52°47′01″E
- Country: Iran
- Province: Mazandaran
- County: Simorgh
- District: Talarpey
- Rural District: Talarpey

Population (2016)
  - Total: 223
- Time zone: UTC+3:30 (IRST)

Musa Kola (Persian: موسي كلا) (Note: Also romanized as Mūsá Kolā) is a village in Talarpey Rural District of Talarpey District in Simorgh County, Mazandaran province, Iran.

== Demographics ==
=== Population ===
At the time of the 2006 National Census, the village's population was 205 in 51 households, when it was in the former Kiakola District of Qaem Shahr County. The following census in 2011 counted 241 people in 74 households. The 2016 census measured the population of the village as 223 people in 74 households, by which time the district had been separated from the county in the establishment of Simorgh County. The rural district was transferred to the new Talarpey District.
