= Talar Posht =

Village in Mazandaran province, Iran

Talar Posht Persian: طالارپشت
- Village
- Location within Iran
- Coordinates: 36°33′48″N 52°47′45″E
- Country: Iran
- Province: Mazandaran
- County: Simorgh
- District: Talarpey
- Rural District: Talarpey

Population (2016)
  - Total: 432
- Time zone: UTC+3:30 (IRST)

Talar Posht (Persian: طالارپشت) (Note: Also romanized as Ţālār Posht and Tālār Posht) is a village in Talarpey Rural District of Talarpey District in Simorgh County, Mazandaran province, Iran.

== Demographics ==
=== Population ===
At the time of the 2006 National Census, the village's population was 406 in 112 households, when it was in the former Kiakola District of Qaem Shahr County. The following census in 2011 counted 374 people in 118 households. The 2016 census measured the population of the village as 432 people in 151 households, by which time the district had been separated from the county in the establishment of Simorgh County. The rural district was transferred to the new Talarpey District.
