= Pazik Kheyl =

Village in Mazandaran province, Iran

Pazik Kheyl Persian: پازيك خيل
- Village
- Country: Iran
- Province: Mazandaran
- County: Simorgh
- District: Talarpey
- Rural District: Talarpey

Population (2016)
  - Total: 64
- Time zone: UTC+3:30 (IRST)

Pazik Kheyl (Persian: پازيك خيل) (Note: Also romanized as Pāzīk Kheyl) is a village in Talarpey Rural District of Talarpey District in Simorgh County, Mazandaran province, Iran.

== Demographics ==
=== Population ===
At the time of the 2006 National Census, the village's population was 61 in 15 households, when it was in the former Kiakola District of Qaem Shahr County. The following census in 2011 counted 72 people in 19 households. The 2016 census measured the population of the village as 64 people in 22 households, by which time the district had been separated from the county in the establishment of Simorgh County. The rural district was transferred to the new Talarpey District.
