= Qajar Tappeh =

Village in Mazandaran province, Iran

Qajar Tappeh Persian: قجرتپه
- Village
- Location within Iran
- Coordinates: 36°34′02″N 52°47′20″E
- Country: Iran
- Province: Mazandaran
- County: Simorgh
- District: Talarpey
- Rural District: Talarpey

Population (2016)
  - Total: 107
- Time zone: UTC+3:30 (IRST)

Qajar Tappeh (Persian: قجرتپه) is a village in Talarpey Rural District of Talarpey District in Simorgh County, Mazandaran province, Iran.

== Demographics ==
=== Population ===
At the time of the 2006 National Census, the village's population was 106 in 28 households, when it was in the former Kiakola District of Qaem Shahr County. The following census in 2011 counted 90 people in 24 households. The 2016 census measured the population of the village as 107 people in 35 households, by which time the district had been separated from the county in the establishment of Simorgh County. The rural district was transferred to the new Talarpey District.
