= Ziar Kola =

Ziar Kola (Persian: زياركلا) may refer to:

- Ziar Kola, Amol
- Ziar Kola, Simorgh
