= Bala Dasteh-ye Rakan Kola =

Village in Mazandaran province, Iran

Bala Dasteh-ye Rakan Kola Persian: بالادسته ركن كلا
- Village
- Location within Iran
- Coordinates: 36°35′55″N 52°47′05″E
- Country: Iran
- Province: Mazandaran
- County: Simorgh
- District: Central
- Rural District: Kiakola

Population (2016)
  - Total: 1,399
- Time zone: UTC+3:30 (IRST)

Bala Dasteh-ye Rakan Kola (Persian: بالادسته ركن كلا) (Note: Also romanized as Bālā Dasteh-ye Rakan Kolā; also known as Bālā Dasteh) is a village in Kiakola Rural District of the Central District in Simorgh County, Mazandaran province, Iran.

== Demographics ==
=== Population ===
At the time of the 2006 National Census, the village's population was 1,190 in 328 households, when it was in the former Kiakola District of Qaem Shahr County. The following census in 2011 counted 1,271 people in 410 households. The 2016 census measured the population of the village as 1,399 people in 479 households, by which time the district had been separated from the county in the establishment of Simorgh County. The rural district was transferred to the new Central District. Bala Dasteh-ye Rakan Kola was the most populous village in its rural district.
