= Najjar Kola-ye Jadid =

Village in Mazandaran province, Iran

Najjar Kola-ye Jadid Persian: نجاركلا جديد
- Village
- Location within Iran
- Coordinates: 36°36′06″N 52°48′23″E
- Country: Iran
- Province: Mazandaran
- County: Simorgh
- District: Central
- Rural District: Kiakola

Population (2016)
  - Total: 330
- Time zone: UTC+3:30 (IRST)

Najjar Kola-ye Jadid (Persian: نجاركلاجديد) (Note: Also romanized as Najjār Kolā-ye Jadīd; also known as Najjār Kolā) is a village in, and the capital of, Kiakola Rural District in the Central District of Simorgh County, Mazandaran province, Iran.

== Demographics ==
=== Population ===
At the time of the 2006 National Census, the village's population was 336 in 95 households, when it was in the former Kiakola District of Qaem Shahr County. The following census in 2011 counted 328 people in 107 households. The 2016 census measured the population of the village as 330 people in 115 households, by which time the district had been separated from the county in the establishment of Simorgh County. The rural district was transferred to the new Central District.
