= Najjar Kola =

Najjar Kola (Persian: نجاركلا) may refer to:

- Najjar Kola, Amol
- Najjar Kola, Babol
- Najjar Kola, Chalus
- Najjar Kola-ye Jadid, Simorgh County
- Najjar Kola-ye Qadim, Simorgh County
