= Najjar Kola-ye Qadim =

Village in Mazandaran province, Iran

Najjar Kola-ye Qadim Persian: نجاركلا قديم
- Village
- Location within Iran
- Coordinates: 36°33′19″N 52°48′49″E
- Country: Iran
- Province: Mazandaran
- County: Simorgh
- District: Talarpey
- Rural District: Talarpey

Population (2016)
  - Total: 747
- Time zone: UTC+3:30 (IRST)

Najjar Kola-ye Qadim (Persian: نجاركلاقديم) (Note: Also romanized as Najjār Kolā-ye Qadīm; also known as Najjār Kolā) is a village in Talarpey Rural District of Talarpey District in Simorgh County, Mazandaran province, Iran.

== Demographics ==
=== Population ===
At the time of the 2006 National Census, the village's population was 697 in 196 households, when it was in the former Kiakola District of Qaem Shahr County. The following census in 2011 counted 697 people in 215 households. The 2016 census measured the population of the village as 747 people in 262 households, by which time the district had been separated from the county in the establishment of Simorgh County. The rural district was transferred to the new Talarpey District.
