= Gushi Kola =

Village in Mazandaran province, Iran

Gushi Kola Persian: گوشيکلا
- Village
- Location within Iran
- Coordinates: 36°31′22″N 52°49′13″E
- Country: Iran
- Province: Mazandaran
- County: Simorgh
- District: Talarpey
- Rural District: Talarpey

Population (2016)
  - Total: 285
- Time zone: UTC+3:30 (IRST)

Gushi Kola (Persian: گوشيکلا) (Note: Also romanized as Gūshī Kolā; also known as Gūshtī Kolā) is a village in Talarpey Rural District of Talarpey District in Simorgh County, Mazandaran province, Iran.

== Demographics ==
=== Population ===
At the time of the 2006 National Census, the village's population was 309 in 88 households, when it was in the former Kiakola District of Qaem Shahr County. The following census in 2011 counted 282 people in 85 households. The 2016 census measured the population of the village as 285 people in 106 households, by which time the district had been separated from the county in the establishment of Simorgh County. The rural district was transferred to the new Talarpey District.
