= Dasteh-ye Rakan Kola =

Dasteh-ye Rakan Kola (Persian: دسته ركن كلا) may refer to:

- Bala Dasteh-ye Rakan Kola
- Pain Dasteh-ye Rakan Kola
