= George Mattson (martial artist) =

American karateka

- Born: September 12, 1937
- Style: Uechi-Ryū
- Teacher: Ryuko Tomoyose
- Rank: 10th dan

George E. Mattson is the author of martial arts books, and the first American to be awarded a black belt in Uechi-Ryū Karate-do. He was the first to teach the style professionally, resulting in its growth in the United States. He was one of the first to publish a book in English about karate, and has continued to publish many books on Uechi-Ryu.

== Career ==
Tomoyose Ryuko originally taught George E. Mattson as a young American serviceman for several hours in the evening after his duties on the military base in Okinawa. He trained only occasionally at the Uechi-Ryu Karate-Do headquarters with Uechi Kanei and his other master students. He was promoted to 1st degree black belt before leaving Okinawa at the end of his service in the military. Tomoyose Ryuko had studied previously with the founders of the other two major Okinawan Karate styles before starting lessons with Uechi Kanei finally. A few months before becoming too ill, Uechi Kanbun returned to Okinawa and taught at his son's karate school in Nago, Okinawa, Japan. During that time, Tomoyose Ryuko studied with Kanbun Uechi and his students there. Tomoyose Ryuko therefore has the distinction of being one of the very few that was a student of all three founders of all three of the major styles of Okinawan Karate, Uechi Kanbun, Miyagi Chojun, and Chosin Chibana.

Mattson returned to Okinawa many times and arranged to travel with his students to Okinawa often. Through his continued travel to Okinawa and the seminars sponsored for Okinawan masters to travel to the US, Mattson has been studying under the majority of Uechi-Ryu Karate-Do masters of the 20th century. As a result, he has been among the first to be promoted to each degree of black belt up to his current rank of 10th degree black belt in Uechi-Ryu Karate-Do in the US.

Mattson has sponsored an ongoing set of seminars by international karate masters including Okinawan Uechi-Ryu Karate-Do masters from Okinawa for over thirty years consecutively since 1983. Almost all of these have been in the United States, except for onen in 1985, held in Okinawa, Japan, with virtual every Okinawan Uechi-Ryu Karate-Do master from Okinawa giving seminars and culminating in the participation in the annual All-Okinawa Karate-Do Kumite Championship with all styles of Okinawan Karate competing from all over the world each year.

Mattson was the chief instructor of a karate school in Boston at various location for decades. Many of his students upon mastery of Uechi-Ryu Karate-Do started successful karate schools in the Boston area and around Massachusetts and the New England area. Many of them, including Mattson himself, moved to Florida and started successful karate schools in Florida. He currently teaches at his karate school in Mount Dora, Florida.

== Books authored ==
Mattson has written books including:

- The Way of Karate, Tuttle Publishing, 1958
- Uechiryu Karate Do : Classical Chinese Okinawan Self Defense, Peabody Publishing, 1974
- The Black Belt Test Guide, Peabody Publishing, 2008
- The Way of Uechi-ryu Karate, Peabody Publishing, 2010
