= Sangtab, Simorgh =

Village in Mazandaran province, Iran

Sangtab Persian: سنگتاب
- Village
- Location within Iran
- Coordinates: 36°31′30″N 52°48′45″E
- Country: Iran
- Province: Mazandaran
- County: Simorgh
- District: Talarpey
- Rural District: Talarpey

Population (2016)
  - Total: 772
- Time zone: UTC+3:30 (IRST)

Sangtab (Persian: سنگتاب) (Note: Also romanized as Sang Tāb and Sangtāb) is a village in Talarpey Rural District of Talarpey District in Simorgh County, Mazandaran province, Iran, serving as capital of both the district and the rural district.

== Demographics ==
=== Population ===
At the time of the 2006 National Census, the village's population was 786 in 215 households, when it was in the former Kiakola District of Qaem Shahr County. The following census in 2011 counted 732 people in 230 households. The 2016 census measured the population of the village as 772 people in 275 households, by which time the district had been separated from the county in the establishment of Simorgh County. The rural district was transferred to the new Talarpey District. Sangtab was the most populous village in its rural district.
