= Kumite =

Martial arts grappling technique

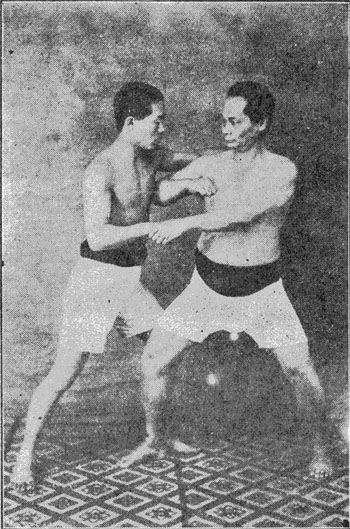
Motobu's twelve kumite (1926)

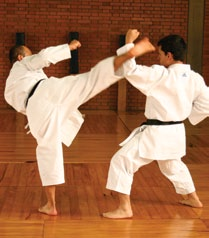
Two karatekas sparring

Kumite (Japanese: 組手, literally "grappling hands") is one of the three main sections of karate training, along with kata and kihon. Kumite is the part of karate in which a person trains against an adversary.

Kumite can be used to develop a particular technique or a skill (e.g. effectively judging and adjusting one's distance from one's opponent) or it can be done in competition.

== Types ==
Since the word kumite refers to forms of sparring, it covers a vast range of activities. In traditional Shotokan karate, the first type of kumite for beginners is gohon kumite. The defender steps back each time, blocking the attacks and performing a counterattack after the last block. This activity looks nothing like the jiyu kumite (or "free sparring") practiced by more advanced practitioners.

Types:

- Ippon kumite - one step sparring, typically used for self-defense drills
- Sanbon kumite - three-step sparring, typically used to develop speed, strength, and technique
- Gohon kumite - five-step sparring, pre-arranged attack and counter exercises
- Kiso kumite - structured sparring drawn from a kata
- Jiyu kumite - free sparring
- Jiyu ippon kumite - one step semi-free sparring
- Iri Kumi - free sparring in Okinawan dialect, used in Gōjū-Ryū
- Jiyu Kobo - old version of Jiyu Kumite in Uechi-Ryū used by Uechi Kanbun's Wakayama dojo

== Delivering strikes ==
All Martial arts schools of all types employ some kind of control when it comes to sparring. Many schools feel it is important that karateka "pull their punches". Karate training is designed to give its practitioners the ability to deliver devastating power through techniques like punches and kicks. Often the aim of training is that each single strike should be enough to subdue the opponent. However, this clearly would make it difficult to train due to the possibility of injury. Many beginners, while sparring, will be instructed to develop control and accuracy first, then speed and power later. In doing this, it may seem like the student is pulling his punches, when actually, he is developing technique first. For injury purposes, certain targets are discouraged, like strikes to the knees and face contact for low ranks. Many schools prohibit strikes to the groin, while others allow it. Some schools might limit contact to light contact all around, while others may employ power usage at higher grades.

A karateka wearing a chest protector

Martial arts schools generally employ some degree of control when it comes to sparring. Karate training is designed to develop the ability to generate significant power through techniques such as punches and kicks. In many traditional approaches, the ultimate objective is for a single, well-executed technique to be capable of stopping an opponent. However, applying such techniques with full power during every training session would make regular practice difficult because of the risk of injury. Beginners are therefore often instructed to develop control, accuracy, timing, and proper technique before progressively increasing their speed, power, and level of contact as their ability to control their techniques improves. To an observer, this may sometimes appear as though the student is “pulling” their punches, when in reality the student is learning to execute the technique accurately while maintaining control. As training progresses, students may be permitted to make progressively greater contact, depending on the school's training methods and rules.

For safety reasons, certain targets may be restricted or prohibited during sparring. These can include the joints, throat, groin, and, particularly for lower ranks, the face. Some schools limit contact to light contact throughout training, while others gradually introduce greater levels of contact as students advance. Protective equipment may also be used, ranging from gloves and shin or foot protection to head and torso protection. The purpose of sparring, however, is not simply to practice hitting an opponent with greater force. Different types of sparring develop different skills, including timing, distance, accuracy, reaction, movement, control, and the ability to apply techniques against a resisting opponent. Even in schools that practice full-contact karate, practitioners may exercise some degree of control during regular training to reduce injuries that could interrupt their practice.

There is an important distinction between control, contact, and power. Control is the ability to regulate a technique and prevent it from causing unintended injury. Contact refers to how much physical force is actually applied to the training partner. Power is the practitioner's ability to generate force when a technique is fully committed. These qualities are related, but they are not the same. A practitioner may possess considerable power while deliberately using very little contact during training, just as a practitioner may make substantial contact without possessing particularly effective power or control.

Some schools that rarely or never use protective equipment, other than groin and mouth guards for protection against accidental injuries, argue that a student cannot truly deliver a maximum-power strike during sparring. Even if the opponent is wearing protective equipment, the practitioner knows that the person across from them is a training partner whom they do not intend to seriously injure. As a result, some degree of control remains necessary. From this perspective, sparring can develop timing, distance, accuracy, reactions, and the ability to apply techniques against resistance, but it cannot completely reproduce the commitment involved in delivering a decisive strike when there is no concern about injuring the opponent.

In a genuine life-or-death self-defense situation, the circumstances are fundamentally different. The practitioner is no longer concerned with protecting a training partner and may be required to commit fully to a technique in order to stop an attack. For this reason, some schools argue that increasing the force used during sparring does not necessarily provide a corresponding increase in the ability to deliver a fully committed defensive technique. Instead, they emphasize developing control and technical proficiency during sparring while using other training methods to develop the ability to generate maximum power when necessary.

== Competition ==
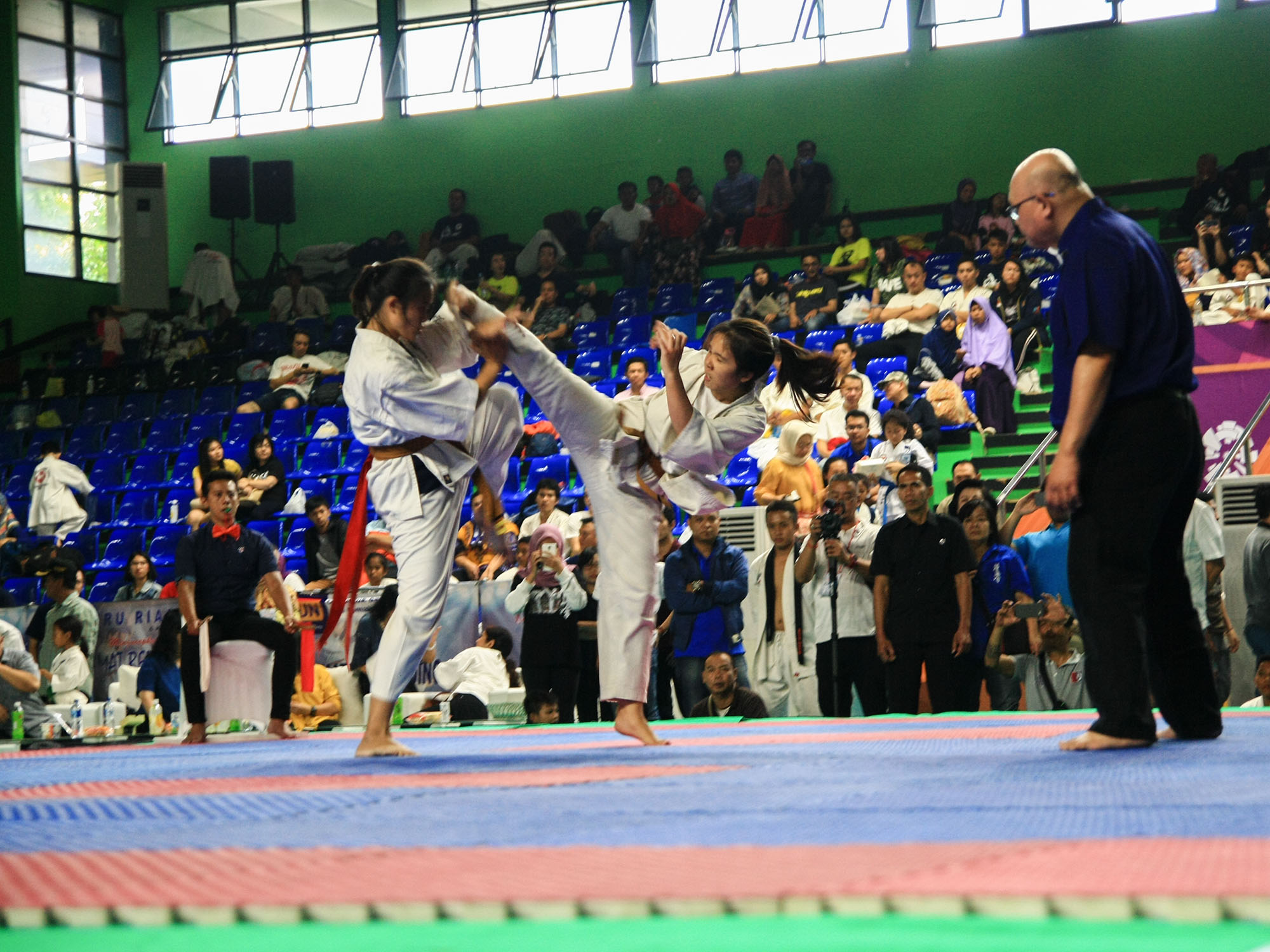
Karate fighting championship

In some forms of competition kumite, punching ("tsuki") and kicking ("keri") techniques are allowed at the head ("jodan") and abdomen ("chudan"). In some tournaments, face contact is allowed, sometimes limited to senior practitioners. One example of a scoring system is that the first competitor to take eight points in three minutes wins the bout.

Kumite is an essential part of karate training, and free sparring is often experienced as exciting, because both opponents have to react and adapt to each other very quickly.

In tournaments kumite often takes place inside of a 'ringed' area similar to that of a boxing ring. If a karateka steps out of the ring, they are given a warning. If they step out of the ring two times, the other person gains a point. Many international tournaments use a "point sparring" form of kumite that requires control ('pulling punches') and therefore warnings can be dealt for excessive force on techniques to the head, or sensitive areas. Full contact is permitted to the torso area of the body only. Some tournament rules allow for light contact to the head, whereas other rules do not allow this.

Kumite also includes a series of guidelines that, if followed correctly, result in a clean and safe fight. These are some of those guidelines:

- A karateka must remain in some form of proper fighting stance and in the "kamae-te" position (hands up, ready to fight position)
- A karateka must be aware of all obstacles around him/her
- A karateka must never deliberately endanger themselves by turning their back to their opponent
- A practiced and well trained karateka must concentrate on stance and footwork

For the last point about stance and footwork: it is often taught that a karateka who wishes to be fast and agile while competing in kumite should always be 'pulsing'. Pulsing is where the karateka remains almost bouncing on the balls of their feet to maintain minimal frictional contact with the ground, allowing them to move quickly.

Another aspect of kumite which is often seen in international tournaments, as well as many local competitions is what is referred to as clashing. Clashing is where both opponents throw techniques against each other at the same time, often resulting in both getting hit with the techniques. This creates a problem for referees as they are unable to make out which technique was quick, on target and recoiled - all the things that constitute a clean technique that is scored. Because of clashing, most modern day karateka are taught to practice kumite in a 'one for one' situation where one attacks, then the other attacks and so on. However, due to the speed of these techniques, and the speed of the footwork of each karateka, to the casual observer it may appear that they are still clashing when in fact they are not. When opponents are considered to be clashing, the head referee should declare "aiuchi" which means "simultaneous hit". When a winner is decided, the referee will announce "~ no kachi" which means "~'s win".

The tournament rules of full contact or "knockdown" styles of karate often don't award any points for controlled techniques delivered to the opponent. In fact, they usually don't award points for full-force techniques delivered to the opponent either. Instead, points are only awarded for knocking, sweeping, or throwing your opponent to the floor. Kyokushinkai and its "offshoot" karate organizations are the styles usually known to promote knockdown tournament rules. They believe this type of tournament competition is closer to "real life" personal combat, although still in a tournament setting with rules.

There are three criticisms to date. First, is the quickness versus skill argument. The tournament fighter learns how to shoot in quickly but deliver an unimpressive strike that gains him or her a point. Also, the question of discoloration of face due to contact, which can allow for disqualification. It is often difficult to gauge the true intensity of the attack, so this could cause questioning. Last, it is seen as sport and sport alone. Traditionalists may dismiss it as "useless", but modern dojos often band with other dojos to form organizations that utilize a tournament circuit as a way to promote their dojos.

== WKF kumite ruleset ==
International competition under the World Karate Federation (also known as the WKF) also includes the following point scoring:

- 1 point ("Yuko"): A straight punch to the face or torso of the opponent (but not to the back of their head or body)
- 2 points ("Wazari"): A kick delivered to the adversary's torso (including the back, sides and front).
- 3 points ("Ippon" - A): A kick delivered to the head of a standing opponent or any scoring technique (such as a stomp or punch) to a grounded opponent. A "grounded opponent" is defined by the WKF as having any body part (except for the feet) touching the ground, and includes an opponent who has been knocked down by a legal strike or swept/taken down. (Any sweep/takedown that is not followed up with a technique may be ruled to be a dangerous technique that can result in a warning against the instigator of that sweep/takedown.)

If the opponent is rendered unable to continue the fight due to a legal technique, then the one who delivered this technique should be announced the winner of the bout by kiken (or forfeiture) of the fight.

Bouts are three minutes long for men, and two minutes long for junior competitors and women. If, at any point during the bout, a competitor accumulates an 8 point lead over their opponent, or if their opponent is disqualified then they will also be declared as the winner of the fight.

Contact to the body is allowed from all ages during competition. When a competitor turns 16 years old, then they will be allowed a "skin touch" (light contact) to the opponents head for both punches or kicks, which stays the same from this age upwards. Prior to this age, no head contact is permitted whatsoever. Ages below 14 years old are required to stop their kicks at least 10 cm away from the opponents head, whereas during the ages between 14 years old and 16 years old, this distance is reduced to 5 cm away from the head. Punches for both age groups must be stopped just before the head/ face and not make contact. As previously mentioned, light contact to the head/ face is permitted from the age of 16 years old and upwards.

The rule of kiken (or forfeiture) is commonly only found with blows to the body. If a (legal) punch or kick is delivered to the body, and causes an athlete to forfeit the bout (as they cannot continue), then the opposition is announced as the winner. When an athlete is legally downed (if they fall or are knocked down by their opponent) and does not immediately get up after the referee calls "yame" (stop) then the referee will call for the tournament doctor and count to 10 out loud in English (identical to the 10 count in boxing) for the athlete to rise. If they do not rise within 10 seconds, then the opponent wins the bout by kiken (or forfeiture). However, blows to the head rarely ever win by forfeiture, as it is normally deemed as excessive contact which results in a disqualification.

There are a list of 15 possible fouls or penalties recognised by the WKF; should a competitor receive a total of four of these warnings, then they will be disqualified from the match, or (depending on the severity of the offences) perhaps even the whole competition by the referee. A full, up to date list of competition regulations (including forbidden techniques) is available on the official WKF website.

== See also ==
- Karate Combat
- Karate at the Summer Olympics
- Karate World Championships
- 100-man kumite
- Bloodsport (film)
