= Akhtehchi =

Akhtehchi (Persian: اختهچي) may refer to:

- Akhtehchi, Hamadan
- Akhtehchi, Mazandaran
