= Dasht-e Kenar Rural District =

Rural district in Mazandaran province, Iran

Dasht-e Kenar Rural District Persian: دهستان دشت کنار
- Rural District
- Location within Iran
- Coordinates: 36°37′N 52°48′E
- Country: Iran
- Province: Mazandaran
- County: Simorgh
- District: Central
- Established: 2012
- Capital: Pain Dasteh-ye Rakan Kola

Population (2016)
  - Total: 2,107
- Time zone: UTC+3:30 (IRST)

Dasht-e Kenar Rural District (Persian: دهستان دشت کنار) is in the Central District of Simorgh County, Mazandaran province, Iran. Its capital is the village of Pain Dasteh-ye Rakan Kola.

== History ==
In 2012, Kiakola District was separated from Qaem Shahr County in the establishment of Simorgh County, and Dasht-e Kenar Rural District was created in the new Central District.

== Demographics ==
=== Population ===
At the time of the 2016 National Census, the rural district's population was 2,107 in 749 households. The most populous of its six villages was Tan Bela, with 472 people.

=== Other villages in the rural district ===
- Borji-ye Kheyl
- Dineh Sar-e Rakan Kola
- Jamal Kola
- Pahnaji
