= Tur Rural District =

Rural district in Mazandaran province, Iran

Tur Rural District Persian: دهستان طور
- Rural District
- Location within Iran
- Coordinates: 36°33′N 52°51′E
- Country: Iran
- Province: Mazandaran
- County: Simorgh
- District: Talarpey
- Established: 2012
- Capital: Kharrat Kola

Population (2016)
  - Total: 2,658
- Time zone: UTC+3:30 (IRST)

Tur Rural District (Persian: دهستان طور) is in Talarpey District of Simorgh County, Mazandaran province, Iran. Its capital is the village of Kharrat Kola.

== History ==
In 2012, Kiakola District was separated from Qaem Shahr County in the establishment of Simorgh County, and Tur Rural District was created in the new Talarpey District.

== Demographics ==
=== Population ===
At the time of the 2016 National Census, the rural district's population was 2,658 in 950 households. The most populous of its nine villages was Ziar Kola, with 704 people.

=== Other villages in the rural district ===
- Akhteh Chi
- Gushti Kola
- Kartij Kola
- Laleh Zar Koti
- Selehdar Kola
- Shir Khvar Kola
