= Kanei Uechi =

Okinawan karateka

Uechi Kanei
- Uechi Kanei
- Born: June 26, 1911; Okinawa
- Died: February 23, 1991 (aged 79)
- Native name: 上地 完英 Uechi Kanei
- Style: Uechi-Ryū
- Teacher: Uechi Kanbun
- Rank: 10th dan

Other information
- Notable students: Seiki Itokazu, Ryuko Tomoyose, Seiyu Shinjo, Seiko Toyama, Shinyu Gushi, Kanmei Uechi

Kanei Uechi (上地完英, Uechi Kan'ei; June 26, 1911–February 23, 1991) was the son of Kanbun Uechi, founder of Uechi-Ryū, one of the primary karate styles of Okinawa. Kanei was instrumental and at the forefront of Uechi-Ryū's growth after his father's death.

== Name ==
"Kanei" (完英) is "ka-n-e-i" (かんえい) rather than "kan-ei" or "kan-eye." For this reason, some English sources will transliterate his name "Kan'ei" to distinguish the separate "n" (ん) syllable from "ne" (ね).

== Life ==
According to traditions repeated in the citatations, in the early years of Kanei's life his father, Kanbun Uechi. refused to speak of his martial arts training; he ultimately opened his first dōjō teaching Pangai-noon in Wakayama Prefecture, Japan in 1926. At the age of 16, and in ill-health, Kanei traveled to the Wakayama and began training with his father. In 1937 Kanei received a certificate of full proficiency in Pangai-noon Toudi Jutsu (Half Hard Soft Empty Hand Skills) from his father.

At the age of 26, he opened a new dōjo in Osaka with approval from his father. Since it was not as successful as he hoped, in 1940, Kanei relocated the dōjō to Amagasaki in Hyogo Prefecture. He taught there for two years before returning to Okinawa in 1942. In April 1949, with the assistance of Ryuko Tomoyose, Uechi Kanei established the Nodake and Kanzatobaru dōjō. The two were combined as one called Futenma dōjō in 1957. A year later, Uechi-Ryū would open to the public, including American G.I.'s, becoming one of the first styles to teach karate to foreigners. While his father's direct students would open their own dōjō, Kanei was recognized as the head of the style until his death.

== Practice ==
A contemporary article notes that when performing Sanchin, Kanei appeared deceivingly soft and relaxed, but upon closer inspection, his body was rock-solid and extremely tough. To condition his fingers, he would repeatedly thrust his hands into a banana tree using a nukite. His fighting stance was extremely strong for defense, and he favored fast wrist blocks with his left arm, while he used his right arm for blocking punches and kicks.

== Additions to Uechi-Ryū ==
Kanei understood early that students of the modern age would have trouble understanding the formal Pangainoon and its three kata. From 1931 through the rest of his life Kanei labored to develop new methods and forms to help students understand Uechi-Ryū. Together with other senior Uechi Ryu instructors, came the addition of the warm-up and stretching exercises junbi undō (準備運動), the standardized exercises that incorporate elements of all of the kata of the system as well as additional techniques, two prearranged "yakusoku kumite (約束組み手)" exercises which are called Kyu Kumite for Kyu ranks and Dan Kumite for Dan ranks, and three new "bridging" kata between Sanchin and Seisan and two between Seisan and Sanseiryu:

=== Kata ===
1. Kanshiwa (完子和): A combination of the first kanji in Kanbun's name, and the last two kanji written in Chinese order of his teacher Zhou Zihe's name in Japanese pronunciation: "Shu Shiwa." Originally known as "Kanshabu" based on earlier mistranslation of his name into Japanese as "Shu Shabu." This kata includes many of Kanbun Uechi's favorite techniques.
2. Kanshu (完周): A combination of the first kanji in Kanbun's name, and the kanji for Shu Shiwa's family name (Shu). Originally known as and sometimes still called Daini Seisan (第二十三) or "Secondary Seisan" by Seiki Itokazu in 1956.
3. Seichin (十戦): Literally translated: "10 fights/conflicts," or a combination of the names of two of the original kata: Seisan and Sanchin.
4. Seiryū (十六): Literally translated: "16."
5. Kanchin (完戦): A combination of Kanbun's first kanji 完 and "fight" 戦.

== Family ==
Kanei Uechi is the son of Kanbun Uechi. Like his father, Kanei Uechi's mannerism and speech was with gentleness. He was the oldest son of four children. He had a brother, Kansei, and two sisters, Tsuru and Kamai. Kanei had a son, Kanmei Uechi who was the head of the Uechi-Ryu Karate-Do Association until he died on Sunday 13 September 2015.
