= Gushi Hui =

Literary magazine in China

- Categories: Literary magazine
- Frequency: Fortnightly
- Publisher: Shanghai Literature and Arts Publishing
- Founded: 1963; 63 years ago
- Country: China
- Based in: Chifeng
- Language: Chinese
- ISSN: 0257-0238
- OCLC: 6519998

Gushi Hui (Chinese: 故事会; Story Collections) is a Chinese language fortnightly literary magazine published in Chifeng, China. It is one of the leading titles in the country.

== History and profile ==
The magazine was established in Shanghai under the name Geming Gushihui (Chinese: Revolutionary Story Collections) in 1963. However, its publication was suspended during the cultural revolution. In 1974 the magazine was restarted.

Formerly the magazine was published bimonthly. Its frequency was changed to fortnightly in 2004. The magazine is published by Shanghai Literature and Arts Publishing. Its headquarters is in Chifeng. The magazine mostly covers short stories.

In 1979 the magazine was renamed as Gushi Hui dropping the word revolutionary. In the 1980s the magazine targeted small villages and aimed at being a publication for public readings there. However, this attempt was not successful. On the other hand, during the 1990s it played a significant role in transition of China from the Maoist politics to the liberal economy.

== Circulation ==
Its circulation was 100,000 copies in 1979. It rose to 7.6 million copies in 1985, but dropped to 4 million at the end of the 1990s. In 2003 Gushi Hui was the best-selling magazine in China with a circulation of 3,520,000 copies.

The circulation of Gushi Hui was reported by its publisher to be 5,400,000 copies in January 2010 and 3,720,000 copies in August 2010.
