= Kiakola =

City in Mazandaran province, Iran

Kiakola Persian: کیاکلا
- City
- Location within Iran
- Coordinates: 36°34′58″N 52°48′41″E
- Country: Iran
- Province: Mazandaran
- County: Simorgh
- District: Central

Population (2016)
  - Total: 8,040
- Time zone: UTC+3:30 (IRST)

Kiakola (Persian: کیاکلا) (Note: Also romanized as Kīā Kalā, Kīā Kolā, Kīākolā, and Kīyā Kalā; formerly Jadīd ol Eslām) is a city in the Central District of Simorgh County, Mazandaran province, Iran, serving as capital of both the county and the district.

== Demographics ==
=== Population ===
At the time of the 2006 National Census, the city's population was 7,364 in 1,980 households, when it was capital of the former Kiakola District in Qaem Shahr County. The following census in 2011 counted 7,691 people in 2,276 households. The 2016 census measured the population of the city as 8,040 people in 2,691 households, by which time the district had been separated from the county in the establishment of Simorgh County. Kiakola was transferred to the new Central District as the county's capital.
