= Ziar Kola, Amol =

Ziar Kola زياركلا
- Village
- Location within Iran
- Coordinates: 36°32′47″N 52°51′38″E
- Country: Iran
- Province: Mazandaran
- County: Amol
- Bakhsh: Dabudasht
- Rural District: Dabuy-ye Jonubi

Population (2006)
  - Total: 188
- Time zone: UTC+3:30 (IRST)
  - Summer (DST): UTC+4:30 (IRDT)

Ziar Kola (Persian: زياركلا, also Romanized as Zīār Kolā) is a village in Dabuy-ye Jonubi Rural District, Dabudasht District, Amol County, Mazandaran Province, Iran. At the 2006 census, its population was 188, in 47 families.
