= Uechi-Ryū =

Style of karate

Uechi-Ryū (上地流)
- Calligraphy of the kanji for Uechi-Ryū
- Country of origin: Okinawa (Japan)
- Date of formation: c.1904
- Creator: Kanbun Uechi (上地 完文), 1877–1948)
- Ancestor arts: Pangainoon; Fujian White Crane; Huzunquan; Naha-te
- Descendant arts: Shōhei-Ryū; Pangai-noon
- Related arts: Karate; Kobudō

Uechi-Ryū (上地流, Uechi-Ryū) is a traditional style of Okinawan karate. Uechi-Ryū means "Style of Uechi" or "School of Uechi". Originally called Pangai-noon, which translates to English as "half-hard, half-soft", the style was renamed Uechi-Ryū after the founder of the style, Kanbun Uechi, an Okinawan who went to Fuzhou in Fujian Province, China to study martial arts and Chinese medicine when he was 19 years old.

After his death, in 1948, the style was refined, expanded, and popularized by his son, Kanei Uechi.

== Early history ==
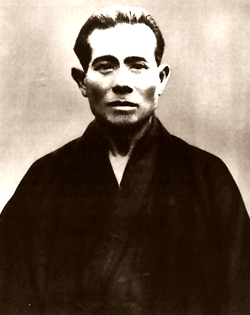
Grandmaster Uechi Kanbun

Kanbun Uechi studied Southern Chinese kung fu and later would refer to the style as Pangai-noon (traditional Chinese characters: 半硬軟) meaning "half-hard, half-soft". In the late 19th century and early 20th century Kanbun Uechi trained under a teacher and Chinese medicine hawker known in Japanese as Shū Shiwa (Chinese: Zhou Zihe 周子和 1874–1926). Shū Shiwa/Zhou Zihe's life is not well documented. Some have suspected without conclusive evidence that he had connection with the secret societies which worked for the overthrow of the Qing dynasty and the restoration of Ming dynasty. Research by the Fuzhou Wushu Association reported in 1984 revealed that he was born in the Zhitian Village (直田村) in 1874 to family wealthy enough to have him educated in letters and fighting arts which included weapons and Tiger Fist Kung Fu or Huzunquan (虎尊拳, Fujian Tiger Boxing).

The exact provenance of the romanization "Pangai-noon" is not clear, and it may be from the lesser-known Min Chinese language. It is not a Japanese, Okinawan, nor Mandarin Chinese pronunciation of the original characters. The standard Japanese pronunciation of the three characters is han kō nan (はんこうなん), while the standard Mandarin pronunciation is bàn yìng ruǎn. The Cantonese language pronunciation is bun ngaang yun. In modern times, the katakana version of pangainoon (パンガイヌーン・pangainūn) has been used in Japanese writing rather than the kanji (半硬軟). While the Fuzhou Wushu Association confirmed the meaning of "half-hard, half-soft" in interviews in 2012, in 1934, Kanbun Uechi explained to Kenwa Mabuni when asked about the meaning of "Pangai-noon" that it referred to the rapid speed of the kata.

After studying about 10 years under Shū Shiwa/Zhou Zihe, Kanbun Uechi opened his own school in Nanjing in 1906, and he continued periodic training under Zhou Zihe for a total of 13 years. Three years later, Kanbun Uechi returned to Okinawa, determined never to teach again because reportedly one of his Chinese students had killed a neighbor with an open-hand technique in a dispute over land irrigation.

While in Okinawa, Kanbun Uechi did not teach his martial art. In 1912, a tea merchant and White Crane Kung Fu master Go Kenki (Wú Xiánguì) who knew him settled in Okinawa. As word spread from Go Kenki that Kanbun Uechi was a skilled martial arts teacher, he received requests to teach but refused.

Due to the economic situation in Okinawa, in 1924, at the age of 47, Kanbun Uechi left for Wakayama City, Wakayama Prefecture, Japan to find employment. While he was working as a security guard for a local cotton spinning mill, he was persuaded by a co-worker, Ryuyu Tomoyose, to teach him privately. After two years of private lessons, Ryuyu Tomoyose and about 30 other men interested in learning convinced Kanbun Uechi to resume teaching. He taught in small rooms in the company dormitory before work, during lunchtime, and after work until 1932 when he opened a general store and the "Pangai-noon Ryu Karate Academy" (半硬軟流唐手術) to the general public. In 1940, he and his students, including his son Kanei, renamed the system "Uechi-Ryū Karate-Jutsu" (上地流空手術) in his honor.

Grandmaster Uechi Kanei

Kanbun Uechi's son, Kanei Uechi, taught the style at the Futenma City Dojo, Okinawa, and was considered the first Okinawan to sanction teaching foreigners. One of Kanei's students, Ryuko Tomoyose, son of Ryuyu Tomoyose, taught a young American serviceman named George Mattson who authored several books on the subject and is largely responsible for popularizing the style in America. Uechi-Ryū emphasizes toughness of body with quick blows and kicks. Some of the more distinctive weapons of Uechi practitioners are the one-knuckle punch shōken zuki (小拳突き, shōken zuki), spearhand nukite (貫手突き, nukite), and the front kick shōmen geri (正面蹴り, shōmen geri) delivered with the first toe (sokusen geri). On account of this emphasis on simplicity, stability, and a combination of linear and circular movements, proponents claim the style is more practical for self-defense than most other martial arts.

In contrast to the more linear styles of karate based on Okinawan Shuri te or Tomari-te, Uechi-Ryū's connection with Chinese Shorin-ken means the former shares a similar foundation with Naha-te (and thus with Gōjū-Ryū) despite their separate development. Thus, Uechi-Ryū is also heavily influenced by the circular motions which belong to the kung fu from Fujian province. Uechi-Ryū is principally based on the movements of three animals: the Tiger, the Dragon, and the Crane.

== Kata ==
There are eight empty-hand katas in Uechi-Ryū. Only Sanchin, Seisan, and Sanseiryū come from Pangai-noon; the others were designed and added to the style by Kanei Uechi and other senior students of Kanbun. Many of the names of the newer kata were formed from the names of prominent figures in the art, e.g. Kanshiwa from Kanbun and Zhou Zihe's Japanese pronunciation of his name: Shu Shiwa. The kata are:

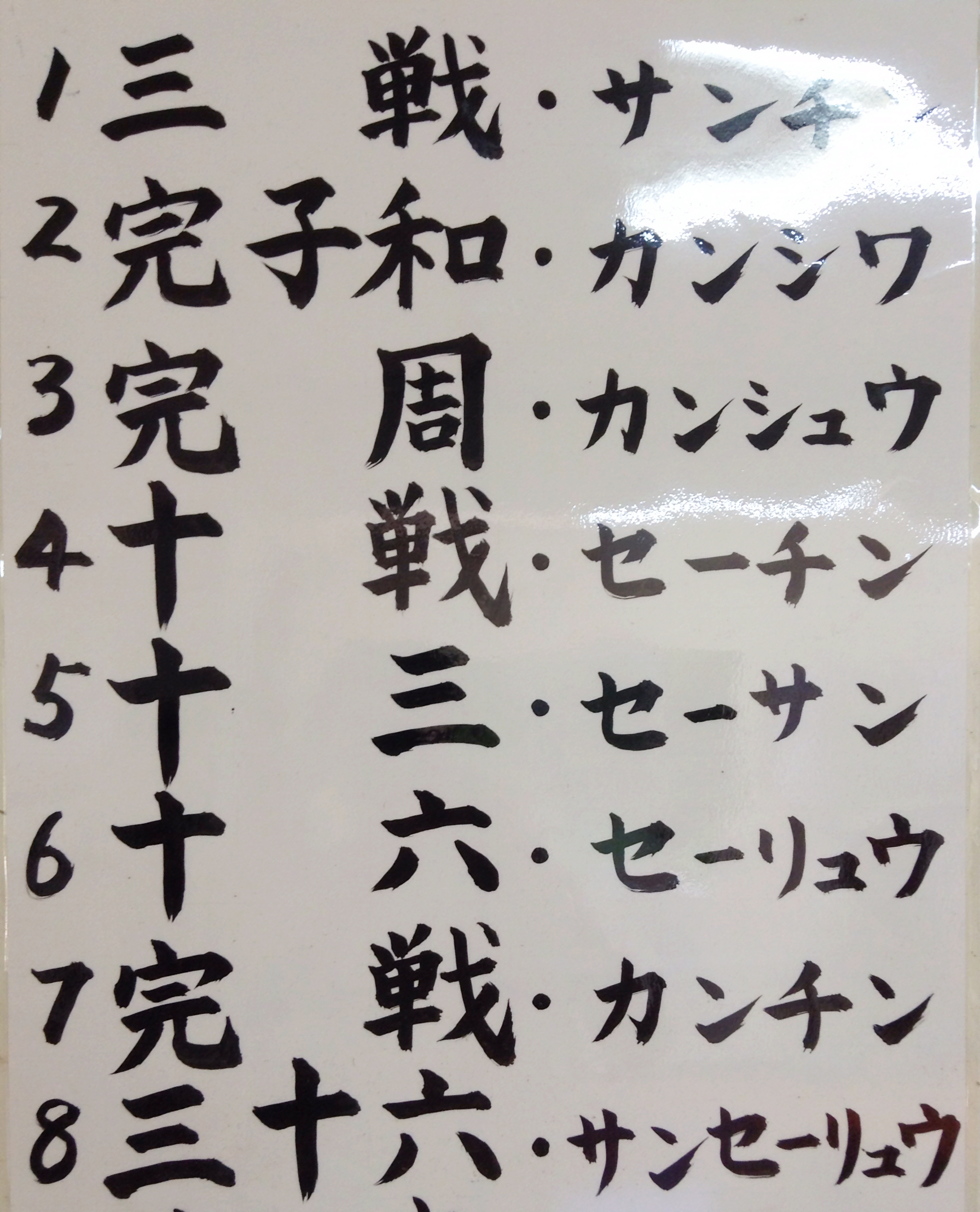
Uechi-Ryū Kata

1. Sanchin (三戦): Literally translated as "three fights/conflicts". From the kanji 三 ("three") and 戦う ("to fight/to struggle"). Usually interpreted as three Modes/Conflicts: "Mind, Body and Spirit". Sanchin is deceptively simple in appearance. It teaches the foundation of the style, including stances and breathing. Kanbun Uechi was quoted as saying, "All is in Sanchin."
2. Kanshiwa (完子和): A combination of the first kanji in Kanbun's name, and the last two kanji written in Chinese order of Shu Shiwa's name in Japanese pronunciation. Originally known as "Kanshabu" based on earlier mistranslation of Zhou Zihe's name into Japanese as "Shu Shabu". Created by Saburo Uehara in 1956.
3. Kanshū (完周): A combination of the first kanji in Kanbun's name, and the kanji for Shu Shiwa's family name (Shu) [see previous note on pronunciation]. Originally known as Daini Seisan (第二十三) or "Second Seisan", it was created by Seiki Itokazu in 1956.
4. Seichin (十戦): Literally translated: "10 fights/conflicts", or a combination of the names of Seisan and Sanchin. Created by Saburo Uehara in the 1950s.
5. Seisan (十三): Literally translated: "13". Usually interpreted as "Thirteen modes of attack and defense" or "13 positions to attack/defend from".
6. Seiryū (十六): Literally translated: "16". Created by Kanei Uechi in 1950.
7. Kanchin (完戦): A combination of Kanbun's first kanji 完 and "fight" 戦. Created by Kanei Uechi in the 1950s.
8. Sanseiryū (三十六): The kanji was originally pronounced "Sandairyū", literally translated as "36". Sometimes interpreted as "thirty-six modes of attack and defense" or "36 positions to attack/defend from". While apocryphal, the 1977 Uechi-Ryū Kihon (Techniques Book) claims Shu Shiwa was also known as "The 36th Room Priest" to suggest the interpretation of the name as the "36th Room Kata" made from techniques taught individually in the previous 35 rooms.

== Ranks ==
These are the ten beginner or Kyū ranks, which in traditional practice count down from 10 to 1. The white, green, and brown belts are standard. Different schools in the same organization may have different designations of the intermediate ranks, such as different belt colors and stripes:

1. 10º Jukyū (White Belt)
2. 9º Kyukyū (White Belt w/1 Green Stripe; Yellow Belt)
3. 8º Hachikyū (White Belt w/2 Green Stripes; Gold Belt)
4. 7º Shichikyū (White Belt w/3 Green Stripes; Blue Belt)
5. 6º Rokkyū (White Belt w/Solid Green Bar; Green Belt)
6. 5º Gokyū (Green Belt w/no stripe; Green Belt w/1 Stripe)
7. 4º Yonkyū (Green Belt w/1 Brown Stripe; Green Belt w/2 Stripes)
8. 3º Sankyū (Brown Belt w/1 Black Stripe)
9. 2º Nikyū (Brown Belt w/2 Black Stripes)
10. 1º Ikkyū (Brown Belt w/3 Black Stripes)

These are the ten black belt or Dan grades:

1. Shodan (1st degree | Regular Black belt)
2. Nidan (2nd degree)
3. Sandan (3rd degree)
4. Yondan (4th degree)
5. Godan (5th degree)
6. Rokudan (6th degree) (Master's title: Renshi; Black belt w/1 Gold stripe)
7. Nanadan (7th degree) (Master's title: Kyōshi; Black belt w/2 Gold stripes)
8. Hachidan (8th degree) (Master's title: Kyōshi; Black belt w/3 Gold stripes)
9. Kyūdan (9th degree) (Master's title: Hanshi; Black belt w/4 Gold stripes)
10. Jūdan (10th degree) (Master's title: Hanshi; Black belt w/5 Gold stripes)

Originally, Okinawan styles use the gold bars on black belts to denote the various masters titles rather than ranks after fifth dan. Thus one gold stripe designated Renshi (錬士), two designated Kyōshi (教士), and three designated Hanshi (範士). In the early 2000s, different Okinawan styles started using the stripes to designate dan grades above godan. Others, including many Uechi organizations, have followed suit, while others have not.

== Additional training elements ==
Kanei Uechi, besides adding kata, also introduced a sequence of exercises to the Uechi-Ryū training regimen. The junbi undō (準備運動, junbi undō) are warm-up and stretching exercises based on Asian school training exercises. The hojo undō (補助運動, hojo undō) are standardized exercises that incorporate elements of all of the katas of the system as well as additional techniques.

The junbi undō exercises are:

1. Ashisaki o ageru undō (足先を上げる運動) (heel pivot)
2. Kakato o ageru undō (踵を上げる運動) (heel lift)
3. Ashikubi o mawasu undō (足首を廻わす運動) (foot and ankle rotation)
4. Hiza o mawasu undō (膝を廻わす運動) (knee circular bend)
5. Ashi o mae yoko shita ni nobasu undō (足を前横に伸ばす運動) (leg lift and turn)
6. Ashi o maeue uchi nanameue ni ageru undō (足を前上内斜め上に上げる運動) (straight leg lift)
7. Tai no kusshin undō (体の屈伸運動) (waist scoop and twisting)
8. Koshi no nenten undō (腰の捻転運動) (trunk stretch)
9. Ude o nobasu undō (腕の屈伸運動) (double arm strikes)
10. Kubi no nenten undō (首の捻転運動) (neck rotation)

The hojo undō exercises are:

1. Shōmen geri (正面蹴り) (Front kick)
2. Sokutō geri (足刀蹴り) (Side kick)
3. Seiken zuki (正拳突き) (Closed Fist Punch)
4. Mawashi zuki (廻し突き) (Hook Punch)
5. Hajiki uke hiraken zuki (弾き受け平拳突き) (Snap Block and Flat Fist Strike’)
6. Shutō uchi Uraken uchi Shōken zuki (手刀打ち裏拳打ち小拳突き) (Chop, Back-fist, One-knuckle punch)
7. Hiji zuki (肘突き) (Elbow strikes)
8. Tenshin zensoku geri (転身前足蹴り) (Turn-Block-Front Kick-Forward Leg)
9. Tenshin kōsoku geri (転身後足蹴り) (Turn-Block-Front Kick-Back Leg)
10. Tenshin shōken zuki (転身小拳突き) (Turn-Block-One Knuckle Punch)
11. Hajiki (弾き) (fingertip strikes), also called shōmen hajiki (正面弾き) (front fingertip strikes)
12. Koi no shippo uchi, tate uchi (鯉の尻尾打ち縦打ち) (wrist blocks/strikes in four directions)
13. Koi no shippo uchi, yoko uchi (鯉の尻尾打ち横打ち) (Fish-tail wrist blocks/strikes)
14. Shinkokyu (深呼吸) (Deep breathing)

Uechi-Ryū developed a sets of pre-arranged sparring exercises referred to as yakusoku kumite (約束組み手). Individual organizations and dōjō have developed their own. They involve two partners exchanging a formal sequence of blocks and strikes. There are five to eleven of these exercises, and each one involves three to six exchanges of single blocks and strikes. The kumite exercises involve blocks and strikes that are, for the most part, also found in Uechi-Ryū kata. Thus, like kata no bunkai, these exercises help students become familiar with the application of Uechi-Ryū techniques. Typically, the highest kyu ranks are expected to be able to move through these exercises with great strength and fluidity. Dan level students practice additional pre-arranged sparring exercises.

Applications of kata are also practiced in a pre-arranged format. These patterns are called kata no bunkai (型の分解). Kanshiwa Bunkai and Seisan Bunkai date to the time of Kanei Uechi. Individual dōjō may create other bunkai for the other katas, such as Kanshu and Seichin, and these will vary in format more from dōjō to dōjō. "Okikukai" – 沖空会 ("Okinawan Karate-Dō Association" 沖縄空手道協会) from the late 1990s to early 2000s developed a "San Sei Ryū Bunkai". Videos made during this time as well as a book, and later DVD document how the sequence developed over time. Interestingly, a recent project headed by the Okinawan government involving many Uechi groups in Okinawa to publish a manual with a DVD for the style has non-"Okikukai" members demonstrate a form of the bunkai that has some slight variations from the current "Okikukai" version.

Special forms of strength training and body conditioning are generally practiced in Uechi-Ryū drilling. A formal Uechi-Ryū forearm conditioning exercise, called kote kitae (小手鍛え), or "forearm tempering," involves variations of striking a partner's forearms with ones fists and forearms. Kanbun Uechi learned this conditioning exercise in China. Similar exercises involve conditioning the legs ashi kitae (足鍛え), or "leg tempering." Uechi-Ryū also trains with makiwara, as well as incorporates other traditional Okinawan physical conditioning exercises as part of their training, such as plunging hands into baskets full of rocks, or performing Sanchin kata stepping while gripping nigiri game (握り甕) (heavy ceramic jars).

== Uechi-Ryū today ==
Like many arts, Uechi-Ryū experienced organizational splits after its founder's death. Nevertheless, in 2018 as part of its Okinawan Karate Style Research Project, the Okinawan government brought together seniors from some of the main organizations, which include the Okinawan Karate-Dō Association (沖縄手道協会), Kenyukai (拳優会), Konan Ryū Shureikai (硬軟流守礼会), and the Uechi-Ryū Karate-Dō Association (上地流空手道協会).

Pangai-noon In 1978 a group of Uechi-Ryū students headed by Seiki Itokazu and Takashi Kinjo broke away from the Ryū due to political disagreements and the desire to teach kobudō in their dōjō, and they adopted the style name Pangainoon Ryū. By the early 1990s Itokazu and Kinjo had renamed this breakaway style Konan Ryū. In the 2000s Kinjo and his students began using the style name Kobu Ryū, however one of Kinjo's students, Mikio Nishiuchi, reverted to using the style name Pang Gai Noon Ryū. This name has also been used by later groups over the years who have practiced the additional kata and exercises. All extant organizations are either former Uechi-Ryū organizations or schools that chose to use the old name, or current Uechi-Ryū schools which wish to give homage to the old name. In 2019 the Okinawa Konan Ryu Karate Dō Association (沖縄硬軟流空手道協会): Seiki Itokazu and currently headed by Seisho Itokazu, changed the name of the association to Uechi-Ryū Karate-do Konan-kai (沖縄上地流空手道硬軟会).

Shōhei-Ryū After the death of the founder's son, Kanei Uechi, most of the senior practitioners of the original art split for political and personal reasons from his son Kanmei Uechi to form the Okinawa Karate-Dō Association (沖縄手道協会). Barred by Kanmei Uechi from using his family name, the Okinawan Karate Dō Association eventually decided to rename its system Shōhei-Ryū (昭平流) which combined the Late Emperor Hirohito's reign name Shōwa and his son Emperor Akihito's Heisei to mean "to shine brightly with fairness, equality, and peace." The Okinawan Karate Dō Association added a new two-man prearranged exercise yakusoku kumite (約束組み手) and an application or bunkai (分解) form for the third original kata: "Sanseiryū bunkai". One teacher developed an additional kata which was deemed by the Okinawan Karate Dō Association to be a kata for his school. With the name "Uechi-Ryū" passing out of copyright in Okinawa, an easing of political and personal disagreements, and a desire to promote the style in anticipation of the 2020 Summer Olympics, on September 18, 2016, the Okinawa Karate-Dō Association officially dropped "Shōhei-Ryū" and returned to the name "Uechi-Ryū."

=== Major organizations of Uechi-Ryū ===
Many consist of a main organization in Okinawa with branches in other countries. Listed strictly in alphabetical order:

Okinawa based

1. Jiteki (自適; "Self-Reliance") Jyuku Association: headed by Ken Nakamatsu
2. Kenyukai (拳優会; International Kenyukai Association): headed by Kiyohide Shinjō: Started as a fraternity in the Uechi-Ryū Association in 1981
3. Konan Ryū Shureikai (硬軟流守礼会): Headed by Tsuneo Shimabukuro
4. Okikukai (沖空会 沖縄空手道協会; The Okinawa Karate Dō Association): headed by senior students of Kanei Uechi in rotation: current head: Yamashiro Hirokuni
5. Okinawa Karate-Dō Uechi-Ryū Zankai (Zakimi Shūbukan 座喜味修武館): headed by G. Seizan Breyette
6. Okinawa Kōburyū Karatedō Kobudō Kōbukai (沖縄孝武流空手道古武道孝武会): headed by Kinjo Takashi
7. Okinawa Konan Ryū Karate Dō Association (沖縄硬軟流空手道協会): headed by Itokazu Seisho
8. Okinawa Konan Ryū Karate-do Renseikai (沖縄硬軟流空手道練成会): headed by Josei Yogi
9. Okinawa Uechi-Ryū Hozonkai (沖縄上地流唐手道保存会): headed by Minoru Miyagi
10. Uechi-Ryū Karate-Dō Association (上地流空手道協会): headed by Sadanao Uechi
11. Uechi-Ryū Karate-Dō Ken Sei Kai (上地流唐手道拳誠会): headed by Yoshitsune Senaga
12. Uechi-Ryū Karate-Dō Shinkokai (上地流空手道振興会修武館):

International Organizations

1. Canadian Uechi-Ryū Karate Association
2. International Uechi-Ryū Karate-Dō Association (IUKA) (Kokusai Kyokai): headed by James Thompson
3. International Uechi-Ryū Karate-Dō Shubukai (上地流空手道修武会): headed by Yasushi Kuno
4. International Uechi-Ryū Karate Federation (IUKF): founded by George Mattson, currently headed by Darin Yee
5. North American Jiteki-Jyuku Karate Association: American branch of the Jiteki (自適; "Self-Reliance") Jyuku Association
6. Okinawa Karate-Do Kyokai Serbia Hombu: Serbian branch of Okikukai, headed by Popović Vladimir
7. Ryukokaku Karate and Kobudō Association (龍虎鶴唐手古武道会; "Dragon, Tiger, Crane, Toudi and Kobudo Kai"): headed by Tsukasa Gushi
8. Uechi-Ryū Bushidō: headed by Bob Bethoney
9. Uechi-Ryū Butokukai: headed by Buzz Durkin
10. Uechi-Ryū International Karate-Do Association (URIKA): Chairman Robert Campbell, and Vice-chairman Jay Salhanick
11. Uechi-Ryu Karate-Do Association (GB): Chairman Terry Daly
12. Uechi-Ryū Karate-Dō Shinkokai Shūbukan (上地流空手道振興会修文): headed by Isamu Uehara
13. Uechi-Ryū Karate Dō Europe: President Didier Lorho; European branch of Uechi-Ryū Karate-Dō Association (上地流空手道協会)
14. União e Força Brasil Karate-Do: Brazilian branch of Okikukai, headed by Gustavo Labareda
15. World Uechi-Ryū Karate Dō Kobudō Organization (WUKKO): President Gustavo Gondra
