= Kanbun Uechi =

Okinawan karateka

Uechi Kanbun
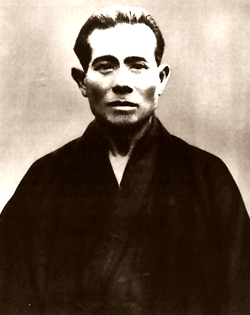
- Uechi Kanbun
- Born: May 5, 1877; Motobu, Okinawa, Ryukyu Kingdom
- Died: November 25, 1948 (aged 71); Ie, Okinawa, USMGR
- Native name: 上地 完文 Uechi Kanbun
- Style: Pangainoon and Uechi-Ryū
- Teacher: Zhou Zihe 周子和
- Rank: Grandmaster

Other information
- Notable students: Kanei Uechi (son), Ryuyu Tomoyose, Saburo Uehara, Seiko Toyama, Seiryo Shinjo

Kanbun Uechi (上地完文, Uechi Kanbun; May 5, 1877 – November 25, 1948) was the founder of Uechi-Ryū, one of the primary karate styles of Okinawa.

== Early life ==
Kanbun was born in Deikusaku section but grew up in the Takintō section of the mountain farming village of Izumi on the Motobu Peninsula of Okinawa, Uechi's family were farmers of daikon radishes. While it is claimed that in his youth, Uechi studied bōjutsu and basic Chinese techniques with Motobu experts, some of whom had lived in China, a more recent Okinawan government sanctioned publication notes that there exists no record of him learning "any kind of martial art" prior to his move to China.

== Time in China ==
Japan began a program of universal male conscription in Okinawa in 1897. In 1897 at the age of 19, Kanbun fled to Fuzhou in Fukien Province, China both to escape Japanese military conscription and to fulfill his dreams of studying martial arts with Chinese masters. Kanbun later told students he was the only survivor of his small "dugout" rowing boat trip to China, and he was rescued by a Chinese martial artist who eventually introduced him to another Chinese martial artist. Upon arrival in Fuzhou, Uechi took residence in the Okinawan boarding house Ryukyu Jyuentaku Hall. He initially took up the study of Kojo Ryū with another Okinawan named Matsuda Tokusaburo. Makabe Udun, an instructor at Kojo dōjō mocked Kanbun for a speech impediment and appearing "slow minded". Makabe nicknamed Kanbun as "Uechi Watabugwa" (big belly or good-for-nothing Uechi). The offended Kanbun Uechi sought training elsewhere, but his resolve to learn Chinese martial arts was even stronger.

Uechi next took up the study of herbalism and a Kung Fu system he identified as "Pangai-noon" (or Pangainun), under a Chinese master of Tiger and Crane styles of southern Kung Fu named Zhou Zihe 周子和 (Called "Shu Shiwa" in Japanese and "Shu Shabu" by Kanbun). A great deal of unsourced apocryphal stories exist on how Kanbun met and came to train with Zhou Zihe. Furthermore, research conducted by the Uechi Family and the local Wushu association in 1984 discovered Shu Shiwa/Zhou Zihe was not the real teacher of Kanbun Uechi but maybe worked an assistant instructor. Huzunquan (Fujian Tiger Boxing) lineage charts show Zheng Xianji (郑仙纪) as Kanbun's true teacher. More recent research in the region with assistance of the Fuzhou Wushu Association does not provide a detailed answer. The Uechi Ryū Kihon claims that Kanbun Uechi never modified the teachings of Zhou Zihe and strictly passed on only what Zhou Zihe taught him. Review of current Uechi-Ryū practice with several styles in Fuzhou linked to Zhou Zihe, which all developed on their own subsequently, led the Wushu Association to suggest that Kanbun made his own modifications to make what he would call "Pangai-noon".

Kanbun received a teaching licence from Zhou Zihe in 1904 and in 1906 he opened his own dōjō in Nanjing. He continued periodic training under Zhou Zihe during the next three years for a total of 13 years. After the three years, Kanbun Uechi returned to Okinawa, determined never to teach again because reportedly one of his Chinese students had killed a neighbour with an open-hand technique in a dispute over land irrigation.

== Return to Okinawa and travel to mainland Japan ==
Uechi returned to Naha, Okinawa in 1909, and he refused to teach martial arts while in Okinawa. He soon married, and his first son, Kanei Uechi was born in 1911. In 1912, a tea merchant and White Crane Kung Fu master Go Kenki (Wú Xiánguì) who knew him settled in Okinawa. As word spread from Go Kenki that Kanbun Uechi was a skilled martial arts teacher, he received requests to teach but refused.

Due to the economic situation in Okinawa, in 1924, at the age of 47, Kanbun Uechi left for Wakayama City, Wakayama Prefecture, Japan to find employment. While he was working as a security guard for a local Showa Spinning cotton spinning mill, he was persuaded by a co-worker, Ryuyu Tomoyose, to teach him privately after having been first convinced to show him ways of defending himself against different attacks. In 1926, after two years of private lessons, Ryuyu Tomoyose gathered together other interested potential students for a total of 30 men who all agreed to pay 5 yen each month. Since his monthly salary was only 15 yen, Kanbun Uechi agreed to resume teaching. Until 1932, he taught in small rooms in the company dormitory before work, during lunchtime, and after work He then opened a general store and the "Pangai-noon Karate Academy" open to the general public in Tebira, Wakayama Prefecture.

In 1934, Kanbun Uechi met Kenwa Mabuni, the founder of Shitō-ryū, who interviewed Uechi in an article "The Story of Chinese Kenpo" he published in the 1934 edition of Karate Research. Mabuni suggested that Kanbun change the name of his style to "Uechi-Ryū" (上地流) or "style of Uechi." The style was officially renamed in 1940 in his honour, and is one of the four major styles of Okinawan Karate.

Kanbun Uechi continued to teach in Wakayama until 1946. In November of that year, Kanbun Uechi turned over his school to Ryuyu Tomoyose and returned to Okinawa and settled on the island of Iejima. Students who included Ryuyu Tomoyose's son, Ryuko, built a dōjō named the Uechi-Ryū Karate Academy. Kanbun Uechi died from kidney disease in 1948.

After Kanbun Uechi's death, his style was formalised by his son Kanei and his senior students. This included the addition of five "bridging" kata between the three Kanbun Uechi brought back from Fuzhou. Uechi-Ryū has students and dōjōs around the world.

== Grade ==
During his life, his style and school did not adhere to the Japanese Dan (rank) system. Out of respect he is considered a "10th dan" and referred to as "grandmaster" in references since his death.

== Family ==
Kanbun Uechi had four children. His oldest son, Kanei, continued his father's work in the martial arts. He had another son, Kansai, and two daughters, Tsuru (named after her grandmother) and Kamai.
