= Kiakola Rural District =

Rural district in Mazandaran province, Iran

Kiakola Rural District Persian: دهستان كياكلا
- Rural District
- Location within Iran
- Coordinates: 36°35′N 52°49′E
- Country: Iran
- Province: Mazandaran
- County: Simorgh
- District: Central
- Established: 1987
- Capital: Najjar Kola-ye Jadid

Population (2016)
  - Total: 2,651
- Time zone: UTC+3:30 (IRST)

Kiakola Rural District (Persian: دهستان كياكلا) is in the Central District of Simorgh County, Mazandaran province, Iran. Its capital is the village of Najjar Kola-ye Jadid.

== Demographics ==
=== Population ===
At the time of the 2006 National Census, the rural district's population (as a part of the former Kiakola District in Qaem Shahr County) was 4,217 in 1,114 households. There were 4,422 inhabitants in 1,385 households at the following census of 2011. The 2016 census measured the population of the rural district as 2,651 in 893 households, by which time the district had been separated from the county in the establishment of Simorgh County. The rural district was transferred to the new Central District. The most populous of its three villages was Bala Dasteh-ye Rakan Kola, with 1,399 people.

=== Other villages in the rural district ===
- Molla Kola
