= Talarpey Rural District =

Rural district in Mazandaran province, Iran

Talarpey Rural District Persian: دهستان تالارپي
- Rural District
- Location within Iran
- Coordinates: 36°33′N 52°48′E
- Country: Iran
- Province: Mazandaran
- County: Simorgh
- District: Talarpey
- Established: 1987
- Capital: Sangtab

Population (2016)
  - Total: 3,920
- Time zone: UTC+3:30 (IRST)

Talarpey Rural District (Persian: دهستان تالارپي) is in Talarpey District of Simorgh County, Mazandaran province, Iran. Its capital is the village of Sangtab.

== Demographics ==
=== Population ===
At the time of the 2006 National Census, the rural district's population (as a part of the former Kiakola District in Qaem Shahr County) was 6,333 in 1,706 households. There were 6,211 inhabitants in 1,924 households at the following census of 2011. The 2016 census measured the population of the rural district as 3,920 in 1,353 households, by which time the district had been separated from the county in the establishment of Simorgh County. The rural district was transferred to the new Talarpey District. The most populous of its 12 villages was Sangtab, with 772 people.

=== Other villages in the rural district ===
- Ahangar Kola
- Gushi Kola
- Meri
- Musa Kola
- Najjar Kola-ye Qadim
- Pazik Kheyl
- Qajar Tappeh
- Salduz Kola-ye Bala
- Samna Kola
- Talar Posht
