= Central District (Simorgh County) =

District in Mazandaran province, Iran

Central District (Simorgh County) Persian: بخش مرکزی شهرستان سیمرغ
- District
- Location within Iran
- Coordinates: 36°36′N 52°49′E
- Country: Iran
- Province: Mazandaran
- County: Simorgh
- Established: 2012
- Capital: Kiakola

Population (2016)
  - Total: 12,798
- Time zone: UTC+3:30 (IRST)

The Central District of Simorgh County (Persian: بخش مرکزی شهرستان سیمرغ) is in Mazandaran province, Iran. Its capital is the city of Kiakola.

== History ==
In 2012, Kiakola District was separated from Qaem Shahr County in the establishment of Simorgh County, which was divided into two districts of two rural districts each, with Kiakola as its capital and only city at the time.

== Demographics ==
=== Population ===
At the time of the 2016 National Census, the district's population was 12,798 inhabitants in 4,333 households.

=== Administrative divisions ===
Central District (Simorgh County) Population
Administrative Divisions	2016
Dasht-e Kenar RD	2,107
Kiakola RD	2,651
Kiakola (city)	8,040
Total	12,798
RD = Rural District
