= Talarpey District =

District in Mazandaran province, Iran

Talarpey District Persian: بخش تالارپی
- District
- Location within Iran
- Coordinates: 36°33′N 52°50′E
- Country: Iran
- Province: Mazandaran
- County: Simorgh
- Established: 2012
- Capital: Sangtab

Population (2016)
  - Total: 6,578
- Time zone: UTC+3:30 (IRST)

Talarpey District (Persian: بخش تالارپی) is in Simorgh County, Mazandaran province, Iran. Its capital is the village of Sangtab.

== History ==
In 2012, Kiakola District was separated from Qaem Shahr County in the establishment of Simorgh County, which was divided into two districts of two rural districts each, with Kiakola as its capital and only city at the time.

== Demographics ==
=== Population ===
At the time of the 2016 National Census, the district's population was 6,578 inhabitants in 2,303 households.

=== Administrative divisions ===
Talarpey District Population
Administrative Divisions	2016
Talarpey RD	3,920
Tur RD	2,658
Total	6,578
RD = Rural District
