= Simorgh County =

County in Mazandaran province, Iran

Simorgh County Persian: شهرستان سیمرغ
- County
- Location of Simorgh County in Mazandaran province (center right, pink)

- Location of Mazandaran province in Iran
- Coordinates: 36°35′N 52°50′E
- Country: Iran
- Province: Mazandaran
- Established: 2012
- Capital: Kiakola
- Districts: Central, Talarpey

Population (2016)
  - Total: 19,376
- Time zone: UTC+3:30 (IRST)

Simorgh County (Persian: شهرستان سیمرغ) is in Mazandaran province, Iran. Its capital is the city of Kiakola.

== History ==
In 2012, Kiakola District was separated from Qaem Shahr County in the establishment of Simorgh County, which was divided into two districts of two rural districts each, with Kiakola as its capital and only city at the time.

== Demographics ==
=== Population ===
At the time of the 2016 National Census, the population was 19,376 in 6,636 households.

=== Administrative divisions ===
Simorgh County's population and administrative structure are shown in the following table.

Simorgh County Population
| Administrative Divisions | 2016 |
|---|---|
| Central District | 12,798 |
| Dasht-e Kenar RD | 2,107 |
| Kiakola RD | 2,651 |
| Kiakola (city) | 8,040 |
| Talarpey District | 6,578 |
| Talarpey RD | 3,920 |
| Tur RD | 2,658 |
| Total | 19,376 |
RD = Rural District

== See also ==
Media related to Simorgh County at Wikimedia Commons
