= Kiakola District =

Former district in Mazandaran province, Iran

Kiakola District Persian: بخش كياكلا
- Former District
- Location within Iran
- Coordinates: 36°35′N 52°50′E
- Country: Iran
- Province: Mazandaran
- County: Qaem Shahr
- Established: 1997
- Capital: Kiakola

Population (2011)
  - Total: 18,324
- Time zone: UTC+3:30 (IRST)

Kiakola District (Persian: بخش كياكلا) is a former administrative division of Qaem Shahr County, Mazandaran province, Iran. Its capital was the city of Kiakola.

== History ==
In 2012, the district was separated from the county in the establishment of Simorgh County.

== Demographics ==
=== Population ===
At the time of the 2006 National Census, the district's population was 17,914 in 4,800 households. The following census in 2011 counted 18,324 people in 5,585 households.

=== Administrative divisions ===
Kiakola District Population
Administrative Divisions	2006	2011
Kiakola RD	4,217	4,422
Talarpey RD	6,333	6,211
Kiakola (city)	7,364	7,691
Total	17,914	18,324
RD = Rural District
