= Yoko otoshi =

Judo technique

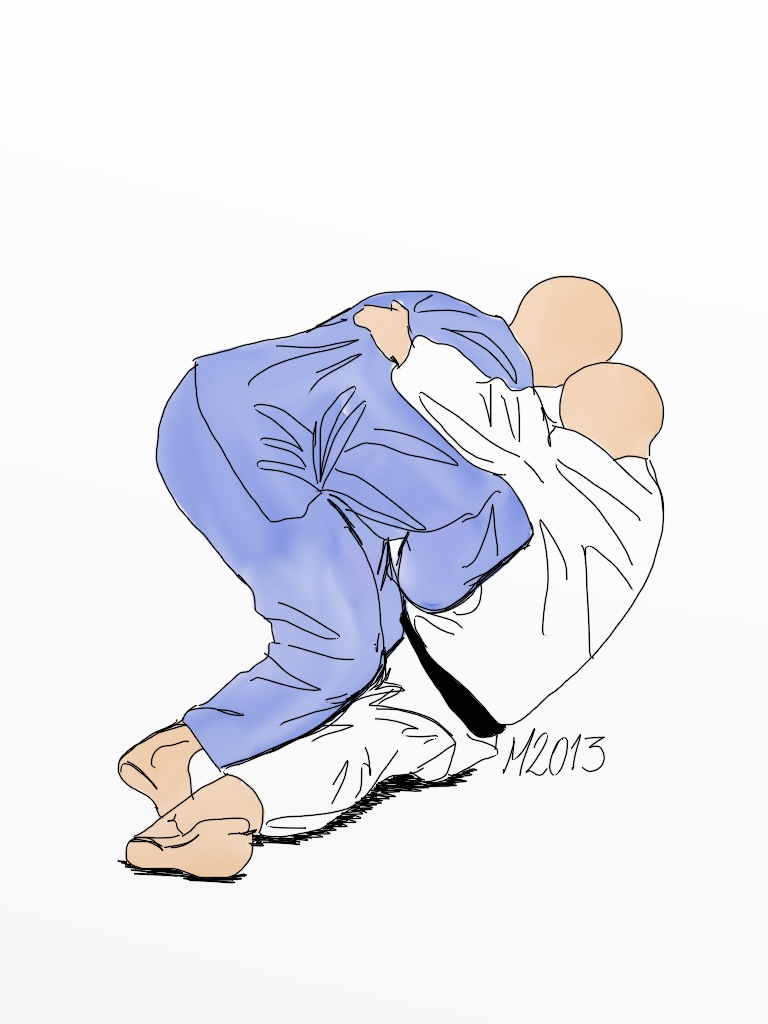
- Classification: Nage-waza
- Sub classification: Sutemi-waza
- Kodokan: Yes

Technique name
- Rōmaji: Yoko otoshi
- Japanese: 横落
- English: Side drop
- Korean: 옆으로 떨어 뜨리기

Yoko Otoshi (横落) is one of the original 40 throws of Judo as developed by Jigoro Kano. It belongs to the third group,

Sankyo, of the traditional throwing list, Gokyo (no waza), of Kodokan Judo. It is also part of the current 67 Throws of Kodokan Judo. It is classified as a side sacrifice technique, Yoko-sutemi.

== Included systems ==
Systems:

- Kodokan Judo, Judo Lists

Lists:

- The Canon Of Judo
- Judo technique

== Similar techniques, variants, and aliases ==
English aliases:

- Side drop

Similar techniques

- Uki waza
- Yoko otoshi
- Tani otoshi

Somehow related

- Yoko wakare
- Tama Guruma

A throw developed by Kyuzo Mifune and described in The Canon Of Judo.
It is also shown in the video, The Essence of Judo.
It is currently not recognized by the Kodokan.
