= Uki waza =

Judo technique

Uki waza 浮技
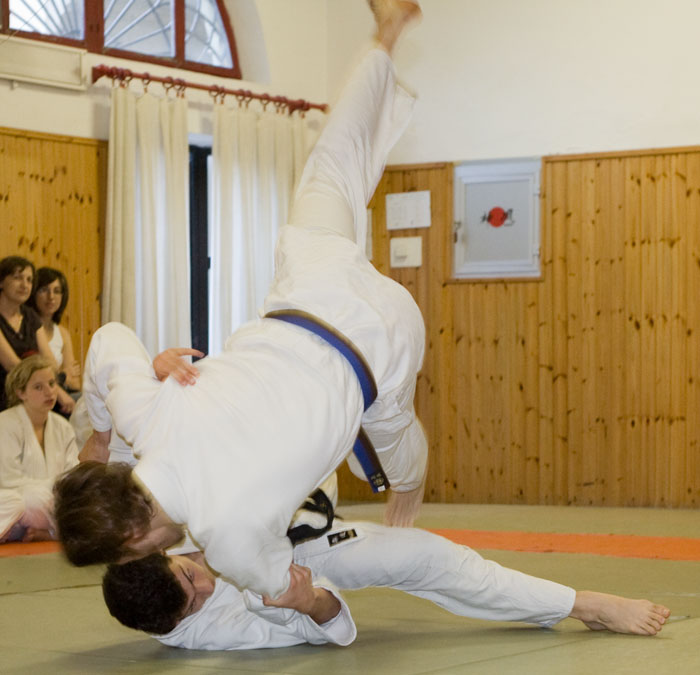
- A demonstration of uki waza. The person on the ground is the one executing the throw.
- Classification: Nage-waza
- Sub classification: Sutemi-waza
- Kodokan: Yes

Technique name
- Rōmaji: Uki waza
- Japanese: 浮技
- English: Floating technique
- Korean: 모로 띄기

Uki waza (浮技, "floating technique"), is one of the original 40 throws of Judo as developed by Jigoro Kano. It belongs to the fifth group, Gokyo, of the traditional throwing list, Gokyo (no waza), of Kodokan Judo. It is also part of the 67 throws of Kodokan Judo. It is classified as a side sacrifice technique, Yoko-sutemi. It is also called a floating throw.

== Included systems ==
Systems:

- Kodokan Judo, Judo Lists

Lists:

- The Canon Of Judo
- Judo technique

== Similar Techniques, Variants, and Aliases ==
English aliases:

- Floating throw

Similar techniques

- Uki waza
- Yoko otoshi
- Tani otoshi

Somehow related

- Yoko wakare
