= Uchi mata =

Judo technique

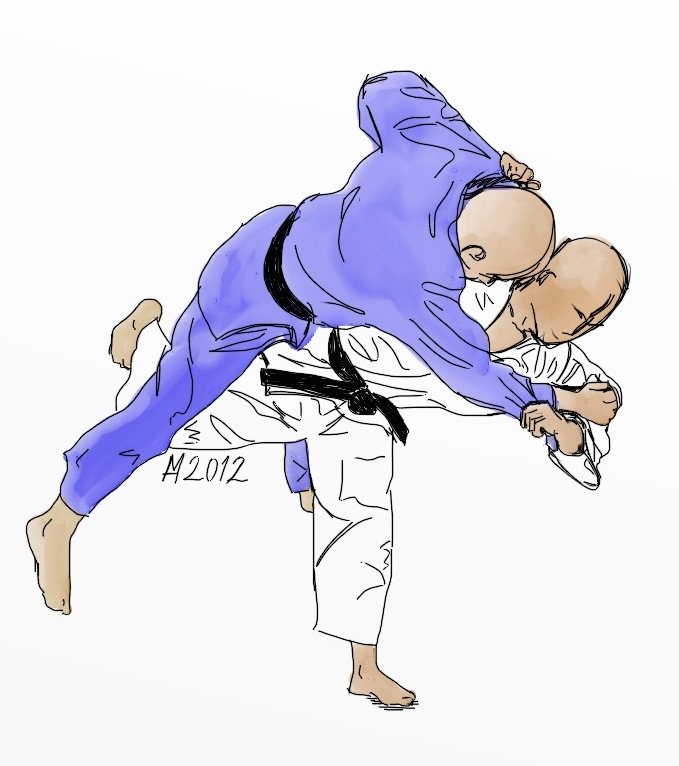
- An illustration of uchi mata
- Classification: Nage-waza
- Sub classification: Ashi-waza
- Counter: Uchi mata sukashi Uchi mata gaeshi
- Kodokan: Yes

Technique name
- Rōmaji: Uchi-mata
- Japanese: 内股
- English: Inner-thigh throw
- Korean: 허벅다리걸기

Uchi mata (内股) is one of the original 40 throws of Judo as developed by Kanō Jigorō. It belongs to the second group, Dai Nikyo, of the traditional throwing list, Gokyo (no waza), of Kodokan Judo. It is also part of the current 67 Throws of Kodokan Judo. It is classified as a foot technique, Ashi-Waza. A counter to uchi mata is uchi mata sukashi as well as Te Guruma. To this day uchi mata has consistently been one of the highest scoring techniques in competition.

== Images ==
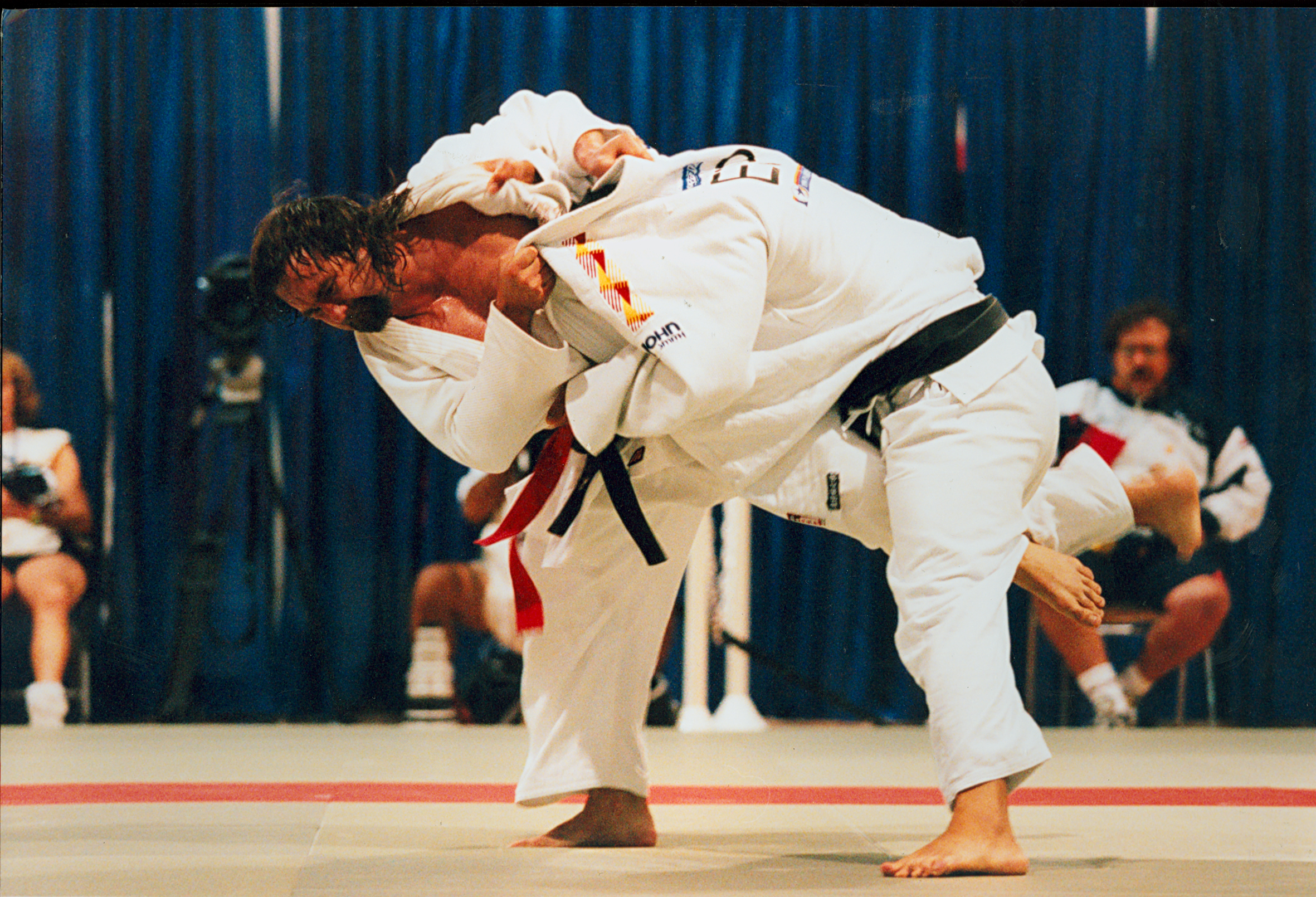
Australian vision impaired judoka Anthony Clarke performing uchi mata at the 1996 Atlanta Paralympic Games

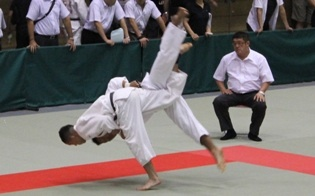
Uchi mata being performed in competition

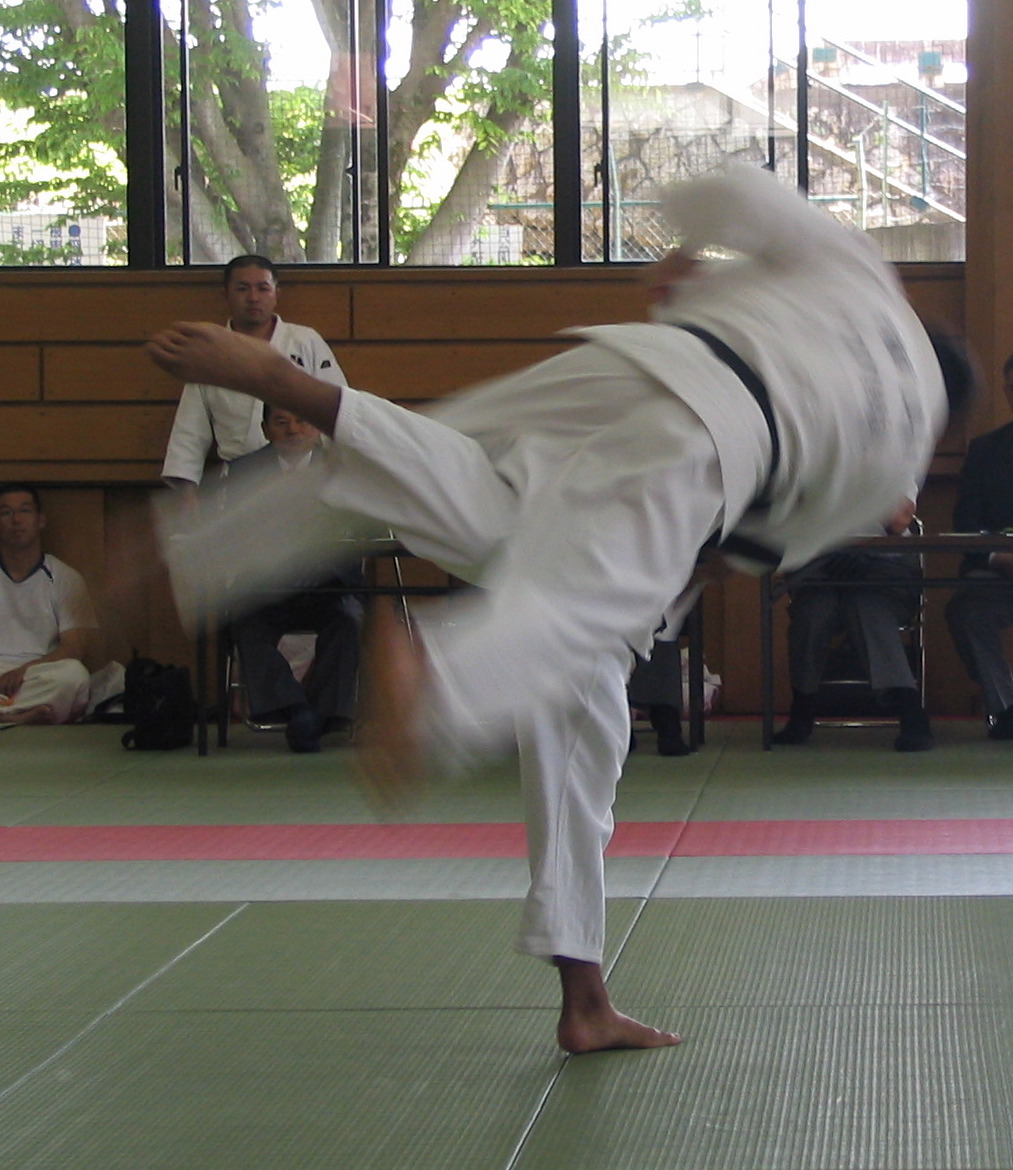

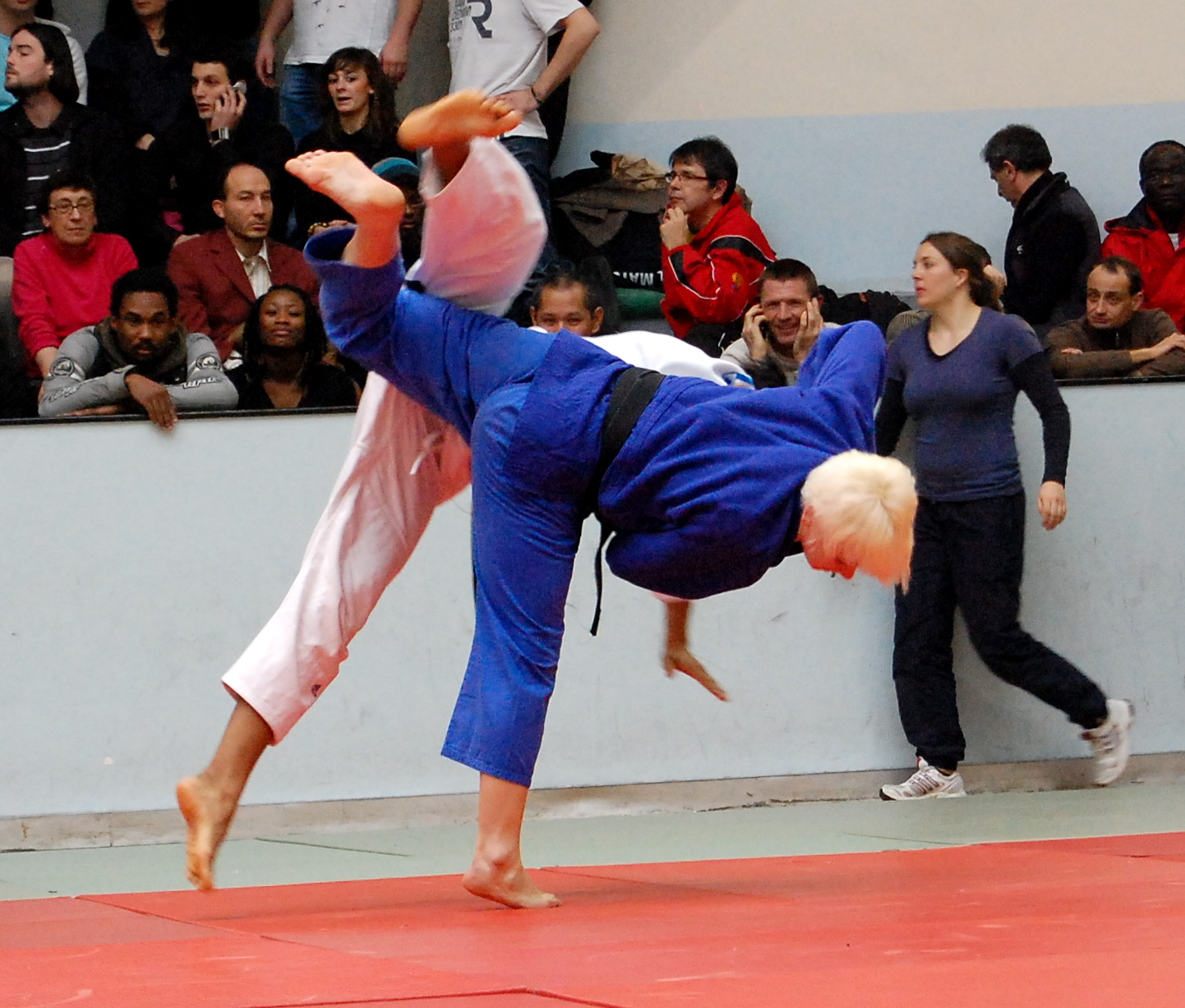
Uchi mata by Morgane Ribout

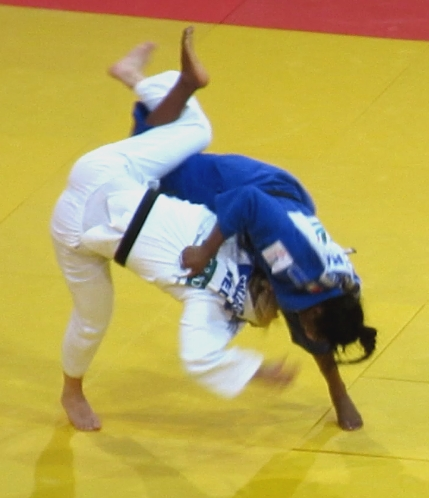
Uchi mata by Madeleine Malonga

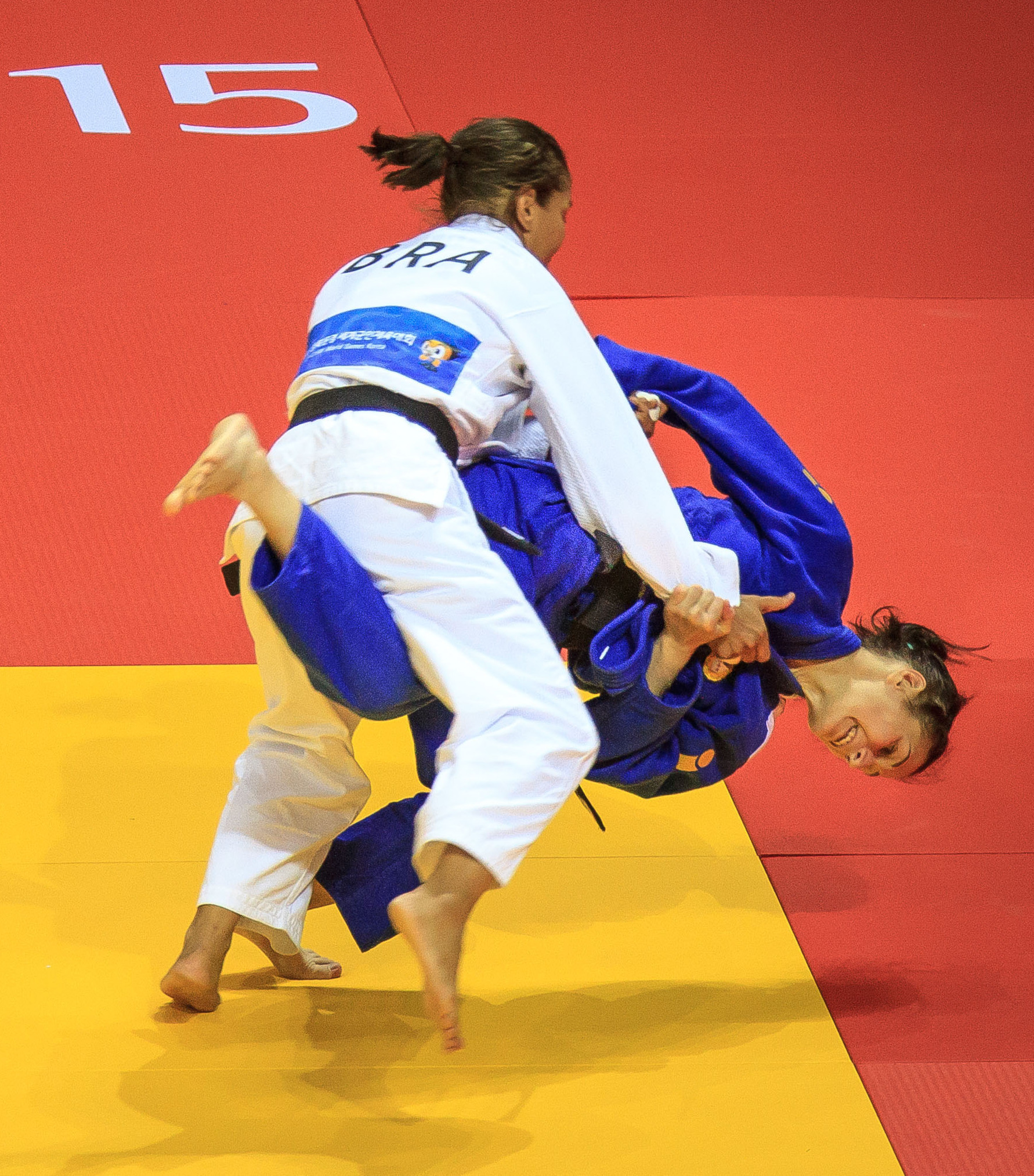
