= Ouchi gaeshi =

Judo technique

- Classification: Nage-waza
- Sub classification: Ashi-waza
- Kodokan: Yes

Technique name
- Rōmaji: Ouchi gaeshi
- Japanese: 大内返
- English: Big inner reap counter

Ouchi Gaeshi (大内返) is one of the techniques adopted later by the Kodokan into their Shinmeisho No Waza (newly accepted techniques) list. It is categorized as a foot technique, Ashi-waza. This technique is a reversal, or counter-throw meant to counteract Ouchi gari Judo throw.

== Technique Description ==
Animation from www.judoinfo.com

== Included Systems ==
- Judo
