= Daki wakare =

Judo technique

- Classification: Nage-waza
- Sub classification: Sutemi-waza
- Kodokan: Yes

Technique name
- Rōmaji: Daki wakare
- Japanese: 抱分
- English: High separation

Daki Wakare (抱分) is one of the preserved throwing techniques,

Habukareta Waza, of Judo. It belonged to the fourth group, Yonkyo, of the 1895 Gokyo no Waza lists. It is categorized as a side sacrifice technique, Yoko-sutemi. The ground version is a turtle turnover.

== Related technique ==
- German suplex

== See also ==
- The Canon Of Judo
