= List of judo techniques =

This is a list of judo techniques. They are categorized into throwing techniques (nage-waza), grappling techniques (katame-waza), body-striking techniques (atemi-waza), blocks and parries (uke-waza), receiving/breakfall techniques (ukemi), and resuscitation techniques (kappo).

The above categorization of techniques is orthogonal to the categorization of domains of combat, which include tachi-waza (立技; standing) and ne-waza (寝技; lying down). Some techniques can be used only in one of these domains, and some can be used in both. In practice, ne-waza is often used as a synonym of katame-waza (固技; grappling techniques), or some of its subcategories, most often osaekomi-waza (抑込技; holding techniques) and possibly also kansetsu-waza (関節技; joint techniques).

Gokyo-no-waza (五教の技; Five sets of techniques) is yet another subcategorization of nage-waza into 5 main groups, as well as groups of preserved techniques (habukareta-waza) and new techniques (shinmeisho-no-waza). This grouping has been made for pedagogical purposes ("Learning the throws in order is the key to mastery.").

== Nage-waza (投げ技): throwing techniques ==
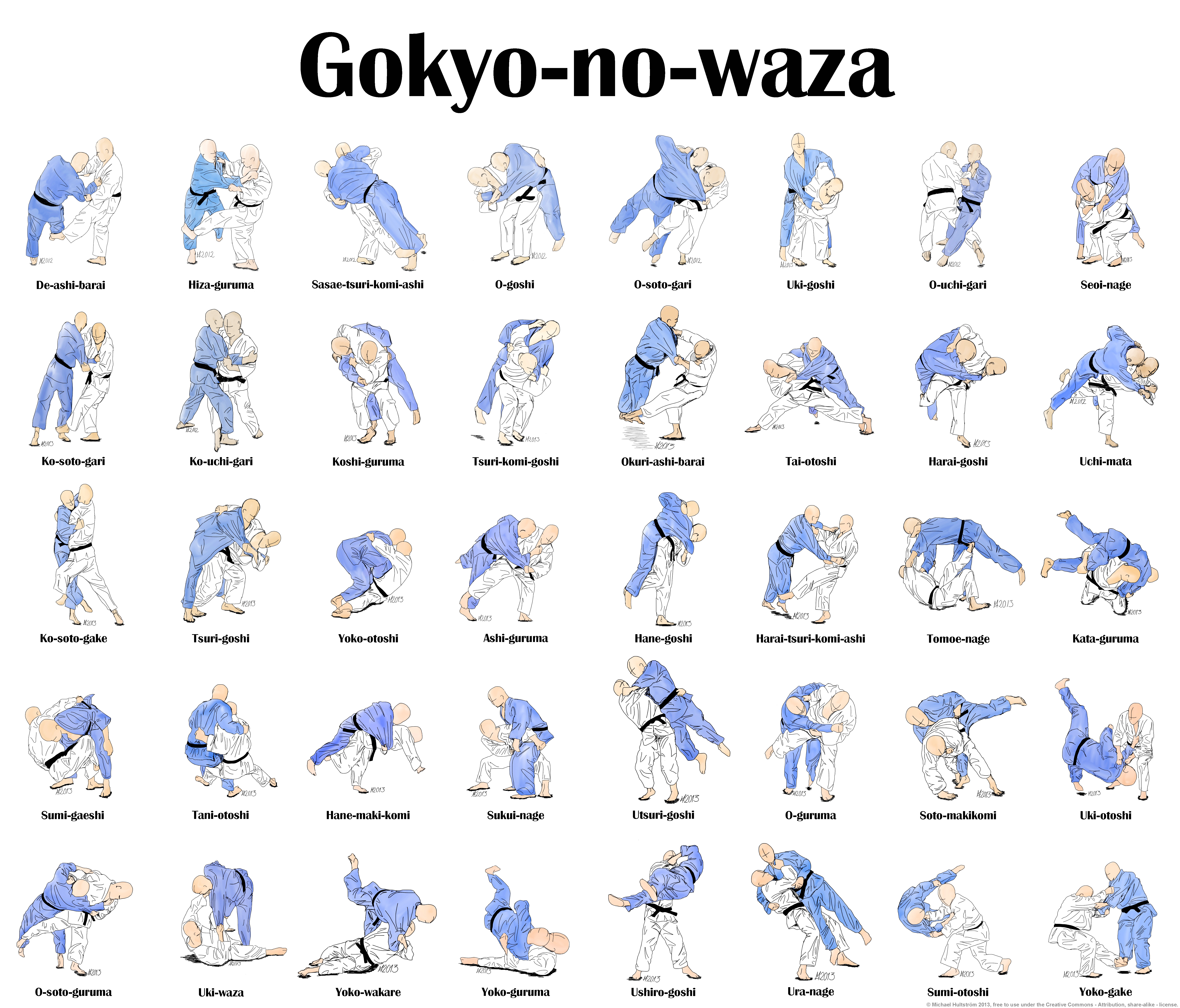
Judo-Nage-waza

=== Tachi-waza (立技): standing techniques ===
==== Te-waza (手技): hand throwing techniques ====
1. Ippon-seoinage (一本背負投): Single-handed shoulder throw
2. Kata-guruma (肩車): Shoulder wheel
3. Kibisu-gaeshi (踵返): One-hand reversal
4. Morote-gari (双手刈): Two-hand reap
5. Obi-otoshi (帯落): Belt drop
6. Seoi-nage (背負投): Over-the-back throw
7. Seoi-otoshi (背負落): Over-the-back drop
8. Sukui-nage (掬投): Scoop throw
9. Sumi-otoshi (隅落): Corner drop
10. Tai-otoshi (体落): Body drop
11. Uchi-mata-sukashi (内股透): Inner thigh void throw
12. Uki-otoshi (浮落): Floating drop
13. Yama-arashi (山嵐): Mountain storm
14. Ko-uchi-gaeshi (小内返): Small inner reap reversal
15. Kuchiki-taoshi (朽木倒): Single leg takedown

Unrecognized techniques

1. Te-guruma (手車): Hand wheel. The Kodokan officially also refersto this technique as Sukui-nage.
2. Morote-seoi-nage: Double handed over-the-back throw
3. Eri-seoi-nage: Collar over-the-back throw
4. Kata-seoi-nage: Shoulder over-the-back throw

==== Koshi-waza (腰技): hip throwing techniques ====
1. Daki-age (抱上): Hugging high lift. (Forbidden in competition.)
2. Hane-goshi (跳腰): Spring hip throw
3. Harai-goshi (払腰): Sweeping hip throw
4. Koshi-guruma (腰車): Hip wheel
5. O-goshi (大腰): Full hip throw
6. Sode-tsurikomi-goshi (袖釣込腰): Sleeve lifting-and-pulling hip throw
7. Tsuri-goshi (釣腰): Lifting hip throw
8. Tsurikomi-goshi (釣込腰): Lifting-and-pulling hip throw
9. Uki-goshi (浮腰): Floating hip throw
10. Ushiro-goshi (後腰): Rear hip throw
11. Utsuri-goshi (移腰): Shifting hip throw

Unrecognized techniques

1. Tobi-goshi (飛腰): Flying/surfing hip throw
2. Ushiro-guruma(後車): Rear wheel

==== Ashi-waza (足技): foot throwing techniques ====
1. Ashi-guruma (足車): Leg wheel
2. De-ashi-harai (出足払): Advanced foot sweep
3. Hane-goshi-gaeshi (跳腰返): Hip spring counter
4. Harai-goshi-gaeshi (払腰返): Hip sweep counter
5. Harai-tsurikomi-ashi (払釣込足): Lift-pull foot sweep
6. Hiza-guruma (膝車): Knee wheel
7. Kosoto-gake (小外掛): Small outer hook
8. Kosoto-gari (小外刈): Small outer reap
9. Kouchi-gari (小内刈): Small inner reap
10. O-guruma (大車): Large wheel
11. Okuri-ashi-harai (送足払): Sliding foot sweep
12. O-soto-gaeshi (大外返): Big outer reap counter
13. O-soto-gari (大外刈): Big outer reap
14. O-soto-guruma (大外車): Big outer wheel
15. O-soto-otoshi (大外落): Big outer drop
16. O-uchi-gaeshi (大内返): Big inner reap counter
17. O-uchi-gari (大内刈): Big inner reap
18. Sasae-tsurikomi-ashi (支釣込足): Propping and drawing ankle throw
19. Tsubame-gaeshi (燕返): Swallow counter
20. Uchi-mata (内股): Inner-thigh
21. Uchi-mata-gaeshi (内股返): Inner-thigh counter

Unrecognized techniques:

1. O-soto-gake (大外掛): Great outer hook
2. Ko-uchi-gake (小内掛): Small inner hook
3. O-uchi-gake (大内掛): Great inner hook

=== Sutemi-waza(捨身技): sacrifice techniques ===
==== Ma-sutemi-waza (真捨身技): "real" sacrifice projections ====
1. Hikikomi-gaeshi (引込返): Pulling in reversal
2. Sumi-gaeshi (隅返): Corner reversal
3. Tawara-gaeshi (俵返): Rice bag reversal throw
4. Tomoe-nage (巴投): Circle throw
5. Ura-nage (裏投): Rear throw

==== Yoko-sutemi-waza (橫捨身技): side sacrifice projections ====
1. Daki-wakare (抱分): High separation
2. Hane-makikomi (跳巻込): Springing wraparound
3. Harai-makikomi (払巻込): Hip sweep wraparound
4. Kani-basami (蟹挟): Crab or scissors throw. Forbidden in competition.
5. Kawazu-gake (河津掛): One-leg entanglement. Forbidden in competition.
6. O-soto-makikomi (大外巻込): Big outer wraparound
7. Soto-makikomi (外巻込): Outer wraparound
8. Tani-otoshi (谷落): Valley drop
9. Uchi-makikomi (内巻込): Inner wraparound
10. Uchi-mata-makikomi (内股巻込): Inner thigh wraparound
11. Uki-waza (浮技): Floating technique
12. Yoko-gake (横掛): Side prop
13. Yoko-guruma (横車): Side wheel
14. Yoko-otoshi (横落): Side drop
15. Yoko-wakare (横分): Side separation
16. Ko-uchi-makikomi (小内巻込): Small inner wrap-around throw

Unrecognized techniques

1. Tama-guruma (球車):Jade wheel. The Kodokan officially also refers to this technique as Kata-guruma.
2. Ude-gaeshi (腕返): Arm reversal. The Kodokan officially also refers to this technique as Yoko-wakare.
3. Yoko-tomoe-nage (横巴投): Side circle throw. The Kodokan officially also refers to this technique as Tomoe-nage.
4. Kubi-Nage (首投げ): Neck throw. The Kodokan officially also refers to this thechnique as Koshi-guruma.

== Katame-waza (固技): grappling techniques ==
=== Osaekomi-waza (抑込技): pins or matholds ===
1. Kesa-gatame (袈裟固): Scarf hold
2. Kuzure-kesa-gatame (崩袈裟固): Broken scarf hold
3. Ushiro-kesa-gatame (後袈裟固): Reverse Scarf Hold. The Kodokan officially also referred to this technique as Kuzure-kesa-gatame until 2017.
4. Kata-gatame (肩固): Shoulder hold
5. Kami-shiho-gatame (上四方固): Upper four quarter hold down
6. Kuzure-kami-shiho-gatame (崩上四方固): Broken upper four quarter hold down
7. Tate-shiho-gatame (縦四方固): Vertical four quarter hold
8. Yoko-shiho-gatame (横四方固): Side four quarter hold
9. Ura-gatame (裹固): Back hold
10. Uki-gatame (浮固): Floating hold

Unrecognized techniques

1. Ura-kesa-gatame (裹袈裟固): Back scarf hold. The Kodokan officially also refers to this technique as Kuzure-kesa-gatame.
2. Sangaku-gatame (三角固): Triangular hold. The Kodokan officially also refers to this technique as Kuzure-kami-shiho-gatame.
3. Mune-gatame (胸固め): Chest hold. The Kodokan officially also refers to this technique as Kuzure yoko-shiho-gatame.

=== Shime-waza (絞技): chokes or strangles ===
1. Do-jime (胴絞): Trunk strangle. Do-jime is a prohibited technique in Judo, and is considered a 'slight infringement' according to IJF rules, Section 27: Prohibited acts and penalties, article 21.
2. Gyaku-juji-jime (逆十字絞): Reverse cross strangle
3. Nami-juji-jime (並十字絞): Normal cross strangle
4. Kata-juji-jime (片十字絞): Half cross strangle
5. Hadaka-jime (裸絞): Naked strangle
6. Kata-ha-jime (片羽絞): Single wing strangle
7. Kata-te-jime (片手絞): One-hand strangle
8. Okuri-eri-jime (送襟絞): Sliding lapel strangle
9. Ryo-te-jime (両手絞): Two-hand strangle
10. Sankaku-jime (三角絞): Triangular strangle, triangle choke
11. Sode-guruma-jime (袖車絞): Sleeve wheel strangle, Ezekiel choke
12. Tsukkomi-jime (突込絞): Thrust choke

Unrecognized techniques

1. Jigoku-jime (地獄絞): Hell strangle. The Kodokan officially also refers to this technique as Okuri-eri-jime.
2. Koshi-jime (腰絞): The Kodokan officially also refers to this technique as Okuri-eri-jime.
3. Ura-juji-jime (裹十字絞): The Kodokan officially also refers to this technique as Kata-juji-jime.
4. Arm triangle choke: The Kodokan officially considers this an osaekomi-waza Kata-gatame.

=== Kansetsu-waza (関節技): joint locks ===
1. Ashi-garami (足緘): Leg entanglement. (Forbidden in competition.)
2. Ude-garami (腕緘): Arm entanglement or "figure-four" key lock
3. Ude-hishigi-ashi-gatame (腕挫脚固): Side-lying arm bar
4. Ude-hishigi-hara-gatame (腕挫腹固): Side-extended arm bar, lower stomach against opponent's elbow.
5. Ude-hishigi-hiza-gatame (腕挫膝固): Knee arm bar.
6. Ude-hishigi-juji-gatame (腕挫十字固): Back-lying perpendicular arm bar.
7. Ude-hishigi-sankaku-gatame (腕挫三角固): Triangular arm bar.
8. Ude-hishigi-te-gatame (腕挫手固): Hand lock.
9. Ude-hishigi-ude-gatame (腕挫腕固): Arm lock.
10. Ude-hishigi-waki-gatame (腕挫腋固): Armpit arm entanglement.

Unrecognized techniques

1. Ashi-Dori-Garami: Entangled leg dislocation
2. Hiza-Hishigi: Knee crush
3. Ashi-hishigi (足挫): Straight ankle lock
4. Sankaku-garami (三角緘): Triangular entanglement. The Kodokan officially also refers to this technique as Ude-hishigi-hiza-gatame.

=== Attack patterns ===
==== Opponent on back ====
1. Near knee guard pass
2. Simple guard pass
3. Stacking guard pass

==== On own back ====
1. Elevator Sweep
2. Push Sweep
3. Yoko-gaeshi: Side reversal
4. Hasami-gaeshi: Swissor sweep
5. Shoulder pin rollover
6. Ude-kakae

==== Opponent on all fours ====
1. Daki-wakare (抱分)
2. Turtle Flip Over
3. Ura-gatame (裹固)
4. Turnover from Koshi-jime
5. Suso-sukui-nage
6. Yoko-obi-tori-gaeshi
7. Obi-tori-sumi-gaeshi
8. Obi-tori-yoko-mawashi

==== On all own fours ====
1. Back Mount Escape
2. Foot lock counter to-rear-mounted position
3. Switch back
4. Hikouki or Hikoki-nage: Aeroplane

==== Extracting own leg ====
1. Niju-garami: Double entanglement
2. Immobilisation of arm

== Atemi-waza (当て身技): body-striking techniques ==
Although taught within kata (型 or 形) and sometimes used within informal randori (乱取), striking techniques are forbidden in standard judo-competitions rules.

=== Ude-ate-waza (腕当て技): arm striking techniques ===
==== Kobushi-ate-waza: fist techniques ====
1. Tsukkake or Tsuki-kake: Straight punch
2. Mae-naname-ate: Front crossing blow
3. Naname-tsuki or Mawashi-tsuki: Roundhouse punch or circular punch
4. Tsuki-age or Ago-tsuki: Uppercut
5. Uchi-oroshi or Uchi-kake: Downward strike or hammer fist
6. Yoko-ate: Side strike or backfist
7. Yoko-uchi: Strike to side
8. Gammen-tsuki: Thrust punch or jab
9. Kami-ate or Ue-ate: Upward blow
10. Shimo-tsuki: Downward blow
11. Ushiro-sumi-tsuki: Rear corner blow
12. Ushiro-uchi: Rear blow
13. Ushiro-tsuki: Rear strike (over shoulders)
14. Ryote-tsuki: Two-hand blow

==== Hiji-ate-waza: elbow techniques ====
1. Mae-hiji-ate: Elbow blow
2. Ushiro-hiji-ate: Rear elbow strike [pic]
3. Age-hiji-ate: Rising elbow strike
4. Shita-hiji-ate or Oroshi-hiji-ate : Downward elbow strike

==== Tegatana-ate-waza: knife hand techniques ====
1. Kirioroshi: Downward knife hand cut
2. Naname-uchi: Slanting knife hand blow [pic] [pic]

==== Yubisaki-ate-waza: fingertip techniques ====
1. Tsuki-dashi: Hand Thrust
2. Ryogan-tsuki: Strike both eyes with fingertips
3. Suri-age: Face slide or forehead thrust [pic] [pic]
4. Yahazu: Strikes with the V-shape of the hand
5. Me-tsubushi: Whipping the back of fingers to strike opponent's eyes

=== Ashi-ate-waza (足当て技): leg striking techniques ===
==== Sekito-ate-waza (蹠頭当): ball of foot techniques ====
1. Mae-keri (前蹴): Front kick [pic]
2. Mae-naname-keri (前斜蹴): Front crossing kick or oblique kick
3. Naname-keri (斜蹴) or Mawashi geri: Roundhouse Kick
4. Taka-keri (高蹴): High front kick

==== Kakato-ate-waza: heel techniques ====
1. Yoko-geri: Side kick
2. Ushiro-geri: Backward kick
3. Ashi-fumi: Foot stomp

==== Hiza-gashira-ate-waza: knee cap techniques ====
1. Mae-hiza-ate: Front knee
2. Yoko-hiza-ate: Side knee
3. Hiza-otoshi: Dropping knee

=== Atama-ate-waza (頭当て技): head striking techniques ===
1. Mae-atama-ate: Strike with the forehead
2. Ushiro-atama-ate: Strike with the occiput
3. Atama-tsuki: Head thrust

=== Kyusho (急所): vital spots ===
1. Tento (天道/天倒): Top of the head, bregma
2. Uto (鳥兎) or Miken (眉間): Between the eyes, nation
3. Kasumi (霞): Temple of the head
4. Jinchu (人中): Below the nose, philtrum
5. Zen-keibu (前頸部): Front side of neck with the Adam's apple
6. Gwanto or Kachikake or Shita-ago (下顎): Point of the chin
7. Dokko (独鈷): Mastoid process
8. Suigetsu (水月) or Mizu-ochi (水落): Solar plexus
9. Denko (電光): Right lowest floating rib
10. Getsuei (月影): Left lowest floating rib
11. Myojo (明星): 1-inch below the belly button, hypogastrium
12. Tsuri-gane (釣鐘) or Kokan (股間): Testicles
13. Shitsu (膝) or Shita-kansetsu (下関節): Knee
14. Ashi-no-ko (足の甲): The surface of foot

== Uke-waza (受け技): blocks and parries ==
1. Tenkan or Tenkai: Outside turning or body rotation
2. Age-uke: Rising block [pic]
3. Harai-uke: Sweeping block
4. Tegatana-uke: Knife hand block [pic]
5. Shotei-uke: Palm block
6. Juji-uke: Cross block
7. Hiki-uke: Grasping block [pic] [pic]
8. Morote-uke: Two-hand block [pic]

== Ukemi (受け身): receiving techniques or breakfall techniques ==
1. Ushiro-ukemi (後ろ受身): Backward breakfall
2. Yoko-ukemi (横受け身): Sideways breakfall
3. Mae-ukemi (前受け身): Forward breakfall
4. Mae-mawari-ukemi (前回り受身) or Zempo-kaiten-ukemi: Forward roll

== Kappo (活法): resuscitation techniques ==
1. Sasoi-katsu (誘活): Inductive method
2. Eri-katsu (襟活): Lapel method
3. So-katsu (総活): Composite method
4. Kogan-katsu (睾丸活): Testicle-method

== See also ==
- List of Kodokan Judo-techniques
- Chokehold
- Grappling hold
- Joint lock
- Throw (grappling)

== Sources ==
- Ohlenkamp, Neil (2006) Judo Unleashed basic reference on judo. ISBN 0-07-147534-6.
- Ohlenkamp, Neil. The 67 Throws of Kodokan Judo. JudoInfo.com. URL last accessed March 6, 2006.
- Sources of kanji: , , ,
- The Kodokan Judo Institute. Kodokan.Org classification of techniques. www.kodokan.org. URL last accessed March 4, 2006.
