= Tate shiho gatame =

Judo technique

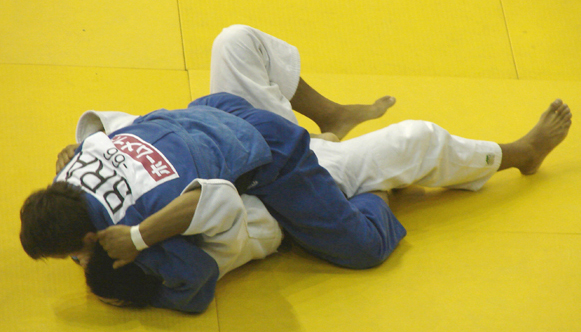
- Classification: Katame-waza
- Sub classification: Osaekomi-waza
- Grip: Full mount
- Counter: Shrimp
- Kodokan: Yes

Technique name
- Rōmaji: Tate shiho gatame
- Japanese: 縦四方固
- English: Vertical four-quarter hold

Tate-Shiho-Gatame (縦四方固) is one of the seven mat holds, Osaekomi-waza, of Kodokan Judo. In grappling terms, it is categorized as a mounted position.

== Technique description ==
Graphic from http://judoinfo.com/techdrw.htm

Exemplar Videos:

Demonstrated from http://www.judoinfo.com/video6.htm

Known as the full mount in Brazilian Jiu Jitsu and other grappling arts. You sit astride your opponent knees up high under armpits to avoid being bucked or alternatively lying on top of your opponent grapevining their legs with your own whilst your arms act as stabilisers and your chest smothering their airways. When the opponent weakens from exhaustion/asphyxiation one should then consider the following options.

The high armpit position allows transition to armbars the other to various choke holds.

== Included systems ==
Systems:

- Kodokan Judo, Judo Lists

Lists:

- The Canon of Judo
- Judo technique
- Brazilian Jiu-Jitsu, Theory and Technique

== Escapes ==
=== Upa ===
Upa is described as a technique onto itself in the book Brazilian Jiu-Jitsu, Theory and Technique, and demonstrated in the video Gracie_Jiu-Jitsu_Basics_Vol.1. It is also part of the movement described as the cross lock (juji-jime) defense method in the book The Canon of Judo.

=== Elbow escape ===
"The elbow escape from the mounted position" is described in the book Brazilian Jiu-Jitsu, Theory and Technique, and demonstrated in the video Gracie_Jiu-Jitsu_Basics_Vol.1.

=== Others ===
- Arm Pull and Roll Over Tate Shiho Gatame Escape

== Similar techniques, variants, and aliases ==
=== Kuzure-Tate-Shiho-Gatame ===
The Canon of Judo lists a variation as a separate technique, where tori secures one of uke's arms instead of uke's neck, as demonstrated in the above animation, while holding onto the belt.

=== Others ===
English aliases:

- Horizontal four quarter hold

Variants:

- Double Arm Tate-Shiho-Gatame
- Head Lock Tate-Shiho-Gatame
- Reverse Head Lock Tate-Shiho-Gatame
- Arm Hold Tate-Shiho-Gatame
- Thigh on Shoulder/Arm Hold Tate-Shiho-Gatame
