= Hane makikomi =

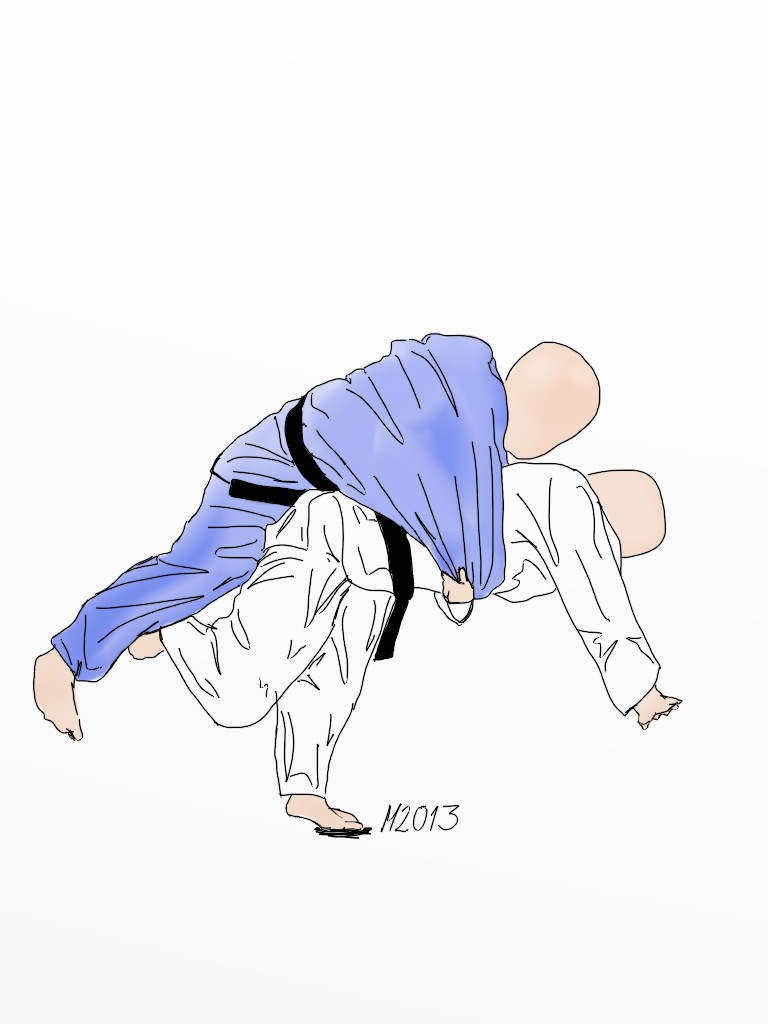
- Classification: Nage-waza
- Sub classification: Sutemi-waza
- Kodokan: Yes

Technique name
- Rōmaji: Hane makikomi
- Japanese: 跳巻込
- English: Springing wraparound
- Korean: 허리 튀겨 감아치기

Hane Makikomi (跳巻込) is one of the original 40 throws of Judo as developed by Jigoro Kano. It belongs to the fourth group, Yonkyo, of the traditional throwing list, Gokyo (no waza), of Kodokan Judo. It is also part of the current 67 Throws of Kodokan Judo.

It is classified as a side sacrifice technique, Yoko-sutemi.

== See also ==
- The Canon Of Judo
