= Kouchi gaeshi =

Judo technique

- Classification: Nage-waza
- Sub classification: Te-waza
- Kodokan: Yes

Technique name
- Rōmaji: Kouchi-gaeshi
- Japanese: 小内返し
- English: Small inner reap reversal

Kouchi Gaeshi (小内返し) is one of the techniques adopted later by the Kodokan into their Shinmeisho No Waza (newly accepted techniques) list. The technique is executed by first dodging Uke's Kouchi gari, thereby forcing them off balance, and subsequently throwing Uke to the left or right by twisting their hands. Therefore, it is categorized as a hand technique (Te-waza).

== Similar techniques, variants, and aliases ==
English alias

- Small inner reap reversal

== Included systems ==
- Judo

== See also ==
- Judo Techniques by type.
- Judo Lists by rank.
