= Tani otoshi =

Judo technique

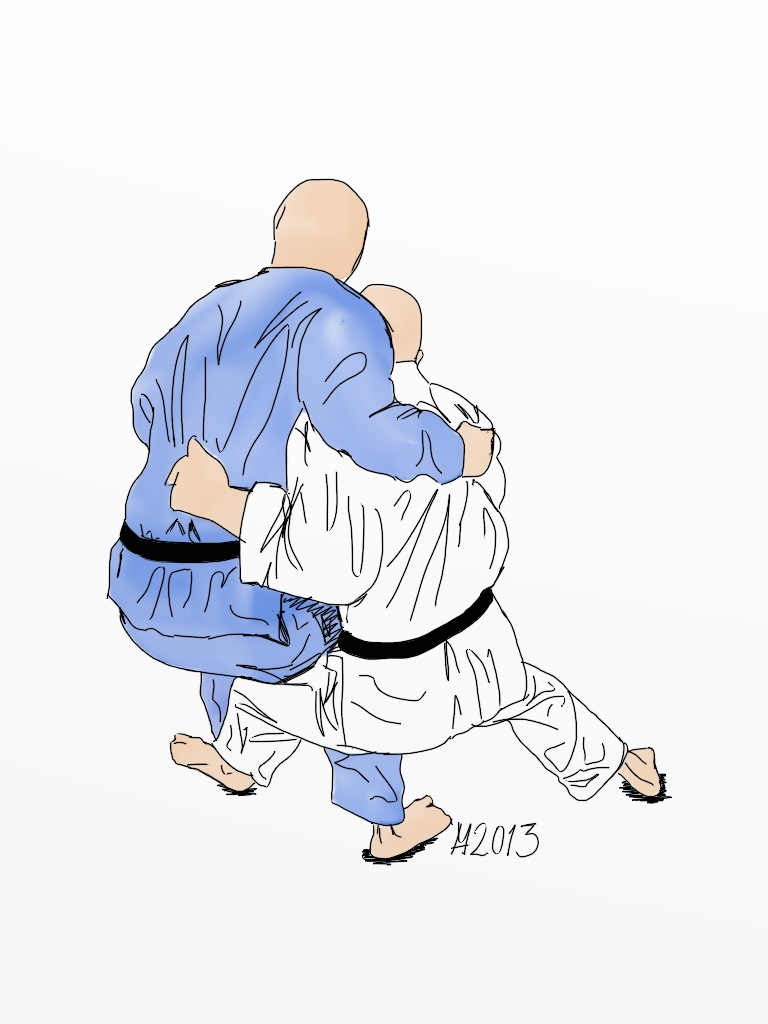
- Classification: Nage-waza
- Sub classification: Sutemi-waza
- Kodokan: Yes

Technique name
- Rōmaji: Tani-otoshi
- Japanese: 谷落
- English: Valley drop
- Korean: 오금 대떨어뜨리기

Tani otoshi (谷落) is one of the original 40 throws of Judo as developed by Kano Jigoro. It belongs to the fourth group of the traditional throwing list in the Gokyo no waza of the Kodokan Judo. It is also part of the current 67 Throws of Kodokan Judo. It is classified as a side sacrifice technique (yoko-sutemi).

== Technique description ==
With the tani-otoshi, you place your leg behind both legs of your opponent while still holding them in your favorite kumi kata and then pull the opponent backwards, resulting in your opponent falling on their back and you falling sideways.

== Similar techniques, variants, and aliases ==
English aliases:

- Valley drop

Similar techniques

  - Uki waza
  - Yoko otoshi
  - Tani otoshi

Somehow related

  - Yoko wakare

== See also ==
- Judo technique
- The Canon Of Judo
