= Osoto otoshi =

Judo technique

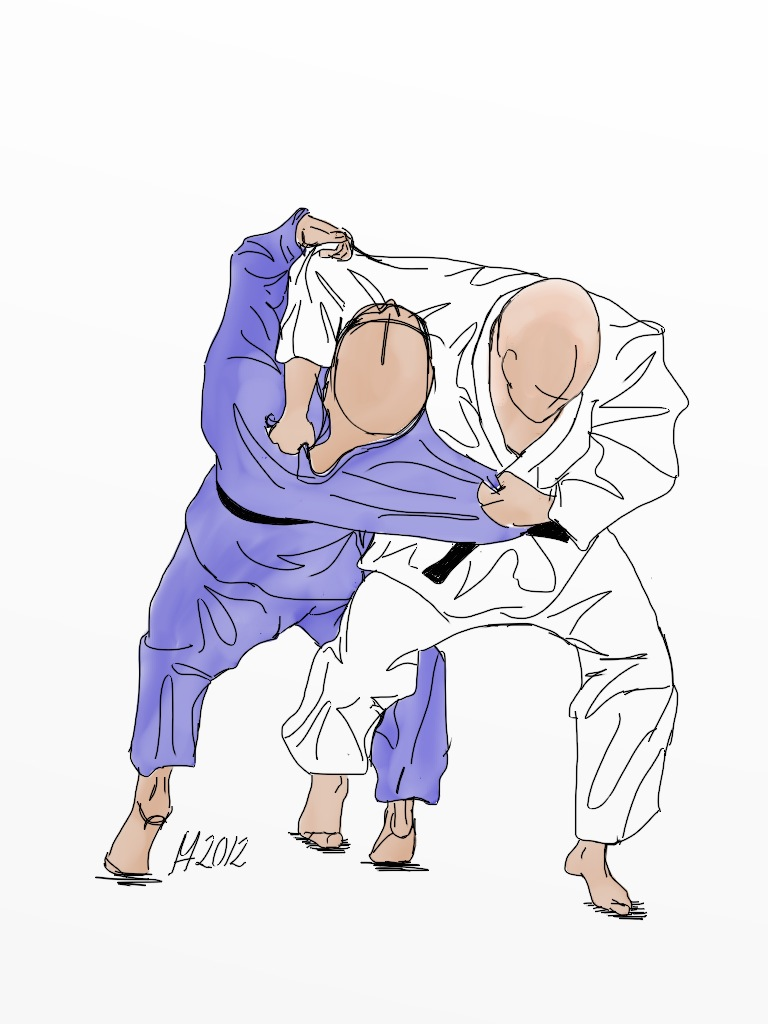
- Classification: Nage-waza
- Sub classification: Ashi-waza
- Kodokan: Yes

Technique name
- Rōmaji: Osoto otoshi
- Japanese: 大外落
- English: Big outer drop

Osoto Otoshi (大外落) is one of the preserved throwing techniques, Habukareta Waza, of Judo. It belonged to the fourth group, Yonkyo, of the 1895 Gokyo no Waza lists. It is categorized as a foot technique, Ashi-waza. This technique is very similar to o soto gari.

== Technique Description ==
The tori wraps one arm across the chest of the uke and hooks his leg with tori's own leg to slam uke to the mat back-first. This technique is very similar to o soto gari with the one difference being the uke's leg in this case does not leave the ground, i.e. the tori hooks the uke's leg, not sweep it.

== Technique History ==
Olympic judo silver-medalist Naoya Ogawa introduced this move to professional wrestling, where it can also be a lariat-legsweep combination to slam down opponent.

== Included Systems ==
Systems:

- Kodokan Judo, List of Kodokan Judo techniques

Lists:

- The Canon Of Judo
- Judo technique

== Similar Techniques, Variants, and Aliases ==
Space Tornado Ogawa, the name the move is referred to in professional wrestling.

English aliases:

- big outer drop

Similar techniques:

- o soto gari
