= Ushiro Guruma =

Judo technique

- Classification: Nage-waza
- Sub classification: Koshi-waza
- Kodokan: No

Technique name
- Rōmaji: Ushiro Guruma
- Japanese: 後車
- English: Rear wheel

Ushiro Guruma (後車) is a throwing technique described in The Canon Of Judo as a reference technique and demonstrated by Kyuzo Mifune in the video, The Essence of Judo.

== Technique description ==
Described in The Canon Of Judo by Kyuzo Mifune as a hip throw where tori uses one of his leg much as in Hane Goshi. In the video, The Essence of Judo, Mifune demonstrates Ushiro Guruma, but notice that his foot does not quite catch uke's hip as described in The Canon Of Judo, but catches uke's inner thigh instead.

== Included systems ==
Lists:

- The Canon Of Judo
- Judo technique

== Similar techniques, variants, and aliases ==
Similar techniques:

- Hane ghoshi

Aliases:

- Rear wheel
