= Sumi otoshi =

Judo technique

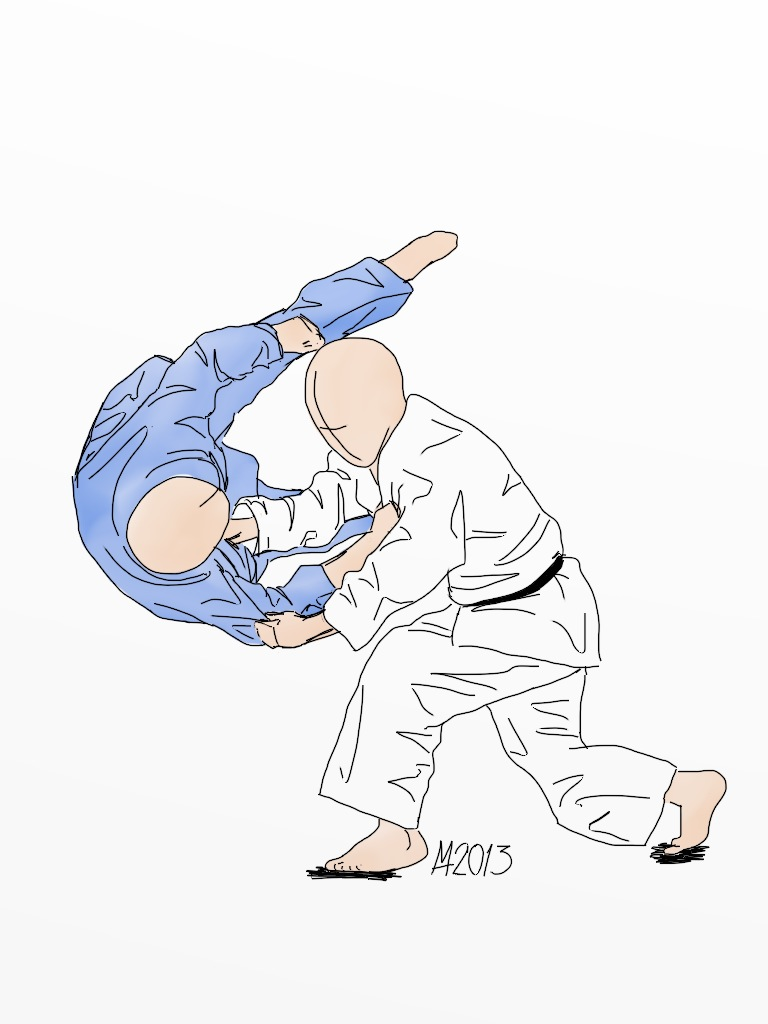
- Illustration of Sumi otoshi Judo throw
- Classification: Nage-waza
- Sub classification: Te-waza
- Counter: Sumi gaeshi
- Kodokan: Yes

Technique name
- Rōmaji: Sumi-otoshi
- Japanese: 隅落
- English: Corner drop
- Korean: 모두 떨어 뜨리기

Sumi Otoshi (隅落), is one of the original 40 throws of Judo as developed by Jigoro Kano. It belongs to the fifth group, Gokyo, of the traditional throwing list, Gokyo (no waza), of Kodokan Judo. It is also part of the current 67 Throws of Kodokan Judo. It is classified as a hand technique, Te-waza.

== Similar techniques, variants, and aliases ==
English aliases:

- corner drop

Similar techniques:

- uki otoshi
