= Uchi mata sukashi =

Judo technique

- Classification: Nage-waza
- Sub classification: Te-waza
- Kodokan: Yes

Technique name
- Rōmaji: Uchi mata sukashi
- Japanese: 内股透
- English: Inner thigh void throw

In judo, uchi mata sukashi (内股すかし) is a hand throwing technique (te-waza) that counters an uchi mata attack. The tori steps aside so the uchi mata misses, then throws the uke forward. The Kodokan adopted uchi mata sukashi as one of several shinmeisho no waza ("newly accepted techniques").

== See also ==
- List of judo techniques
- List of Kodokan judo techniques
