= Daki age =

Judo technique

Daki Age
- Illustration of Daki age throw
- Classification: Nage-waza
- Sub classification: Koshi-waza
- Grip: Two hand lapel
- Counter: Sweep
- Kodokan: Yes

Technique name
- Rōmaji: Daki-Age
- Japanese: 抱上
- English: High lift

Daki Age (抱上) is a throw in judo. It is one of the techniques adopted later by the Kodokan into the Shinmeisho No Waza (newly accepted techniques) list. It is categorized as a hip technique, Koshi-waza. In practice it is very similar to a body slam, the object being for tori to lift uke while in his guard subsequently forcefully dropping uke onto their back. This is a very dangerous technique that has the potential to cause spinal injuries. Generally uke will release their guard if they cannot prevent the lift.

As of 2017, the Kodokan no longer officially recognises this technique and has been removed from the Shinmeisho-no-waza group.

== See also ==
- The Canon Of Judo
