= Soto makikomi =

Judo technique

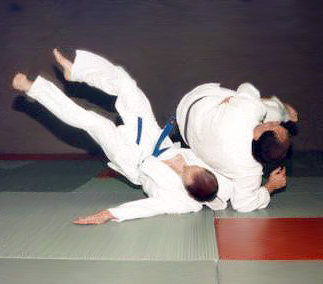
- Judoka demonstrating a dynamic Soto makikomi
- Classification: Nage-waza
- Sub classification: Sutemi-waza
- Successive techniques: Kesa gatame
- Kodokan: Yes

Technique name
- Rōmaji: Soto makikomi
- Japanese: 外巻込
- English: Outer wraparound
- Korean: 바깥 감아치기

Soto Makikomi (外巻込) is one of the traditional forty throws of Judo as developed by Jigoro Kano. It belongs to the fourth group, Yonkyo, of the traditional throwing list, Gokyo (no waza), of Kodokan Judo. It is also part of the current 67 throws of Kodokan Judo. Because tori takes a side fall next to uke, the technique is categorized as a side sacrifice technique, Yoku-sutemi. Danzan Ryu's Makikomi (巻込) is also one of the twenty throws in the Nagete list, which most closely resembles Soto Makikomi.

== Technique Description ==
Graphic from http://www.judoinfo.com/techdraw.htm

Judo:

Danzan Ryu:

Exemplar Videos:

Demonstrated, from http://www.suginoharyu.com/html/index.html

Tournament from http://www.judo.waw.pl/filmiki.html

== Similar Techniques, Variants, and Aliases ==
English Aliases:

- Outer wraparound
- Dropping spinning throw

== Included Systems ==
- Judo
- Danzan Ryu
