= Tama Guruma =

Judo technique

Tama guruma
- Classification: Nage-waza
- Sub classification: Sutemi-waza
- Kodokan: No

Technique name
- Rōmaji: Tama guruma
- Japanese: 球車
- English: Jade wheel

Tama Guruma (球車) is a throwing technique described in The Canon of Judo as a reference technique and demonstrated by Kyuzo Mifune in the video, The Essence of Judo. This technique is unrecognised by the Kodokan; it is categorized as Yoko-sutemi (side sacrifice). It is similar to Kata Guruma.

== See also ==
- Judo technique
