= Uchi makikomi =

Judo technique

- Classification: Nage-waza
- Sub classification: Sutemi-waza
- Kodokan: Yes

Technique name
- Rōmaji: Uchi makikomi
- Japanese: 内巻込
- English: Inner wraparound

Uchi Makikomi (内巻込) is one of the preserved throwing techniques, Habukareta Waza, of Judo. It belonged to the fifth group, Gokyo, of the 1895 Gokyo no Waza lists. It is categorized as a side sacrifice technique, Yoko-sutemi.

== See also ==
- the Canon of Judo
