= Sode tsurikomi goshi =

Judo technique

Sode tsurikomi goshi 袖釣込腰
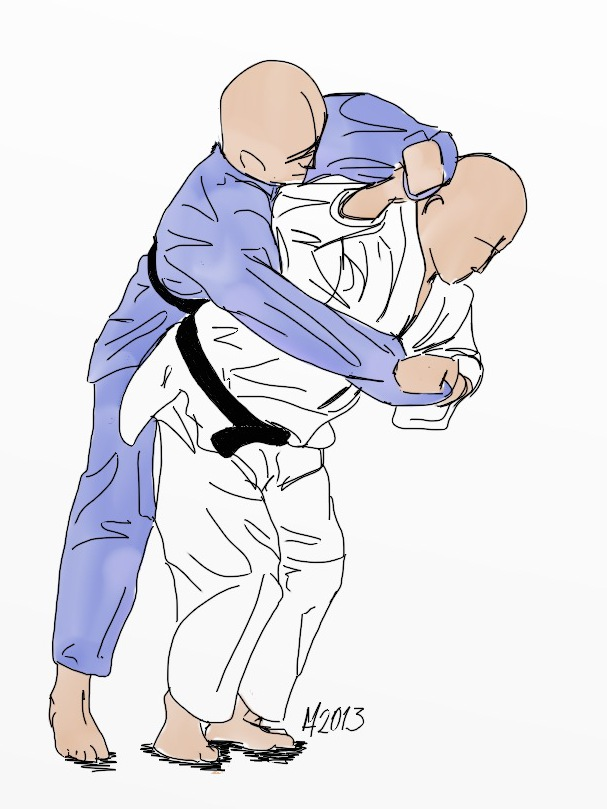
- Illustration of the judo throw sode tsurikomi goshi.
- Classification: Nage-waza
- Sub classification: Koshi-waza
- Kodokan: Yes

Technique name
- Rōmaji: Sode tsurikomi goshi
- Japanese: 袖釣込腰
- English: Sleeve lifting and pulling hip throw
- Korean: 소매 들어 허리 채기

Sode tsurikomi goshi (袖釣込腰) is a Judo throw and one of the techniques adopted by the Kodokan into their Shinmeisho No Waza (newly accepted techniques) list. It is categorized as a hip technique, or Koshi-waza. Sode Tsurikomi Goshi translates as sleeve lifting pulling hip throw.

== Technique Description ==
Sode tsurikomi goshi is a hip throw used in judo. It is performed by taking a grip on both opponents sleeves, holding one high above the head—the right one when done right-handed—turning in to face the same direction as the opponent, and pulling them over the hips. The throw can also be performed when the judoka takes a normal right handed grip, (one hand on the sleeve and one on the lapel) the judoka then turns into the arm holding the lapel and positions the ukes armpit on his/her/their shoulder and bends their knees, lifting the uke up into the air and onto their back, the judoka then keeps 'pushing' the sleeve and pulling the lapel this causes the uke to go over the hip and land on their back on the mat.

== See also ==
- List of judo techniques
- List of Kodokan judo techniques by rank.
