= Judo atemi waza =

Judo technique

Atemi waza (当て身技) or body-striking techniques were the strikes from the several ancient traditional Japanese jujitsu styles that were adopted in judo by its designer Jigorō Kanō in 1882 after a comprehensive study, accompanied by uke waza or defending blocks and parries. When judo further developed as a sports discipline, these techniques were excluded from its competition repertoire, which limits itself mainly to throws (nage waza) and holds (katame waza): although taught within self-defense, kata and sometimes used within informal randori, striking techniques are forbidden in the sport judo competitions rules.

Kanō thought deeply of atemi waza and its relationship with nage waza. Since he wanted to keep the practical character of martial art as well as its nature of physical and moral education, when compiling the nage nokata or randori-no-kata, his classical repertoire of 40 throws in the gokyo no waza (five sets of techniques), the standard syllabus of throwing techniques, he introduced four counterattack techniques against atemi waza: seoi nage, uki goshi, ura nage and yoko guruma.

He distinguished a number of 23 body-striking techniques:

== Ude-Ate-waza: arm striking techniques ==
- Empi-uchi: Elbow blow
- Kami-ate: Upward blow
- Kirioroshi: Downward knife hand blow
- Naname-ate: Front crossing blow
- Naname-uchi: Slanting knife hand blow
- Ryogan-tsuki: throat strike - Strike both eyes with fingertips
- Shimo-tsuki: Downward blow
- Tsukiage: Uppercut
- Tsukidashi: Stomach punch with fingertips
- Tsukkake: Straight punch
- Uchioroshi: Downward strike
- Ushiro-ate: Rear elbow strike
- Ushiro-sumi-tsuki: Rear corner blow
- Ushiro-tsuki: Rear blow
- Ushiro-uchi: Rear blow
- Yoko-ate: Side blow
- Yoko-uchi: Side blow

== Ashi-Ate-waza: Leg striking techniques ==
- Mae-ate: Front knee
- Mae-keri: Front kick
- Naname-keri: Roundhouse kick
- Taka-keri: High Front kick
- Ushiro-geri: Backward kick
- Yoko-geri: Side kick
