= Uchi mata gaeshi =

Judo technique

- Classification: Nage-waza
- Sub classification: Ashi-waza
- Kodokan: Yes

Technique name
- Rōmaji: Uchi-mata-gaeshi
- Japanese: 内股返
- English: Inner-thigh counter

Uchi Mata Gaeshi (内股返) is one of the techniques adopted later by the Kodokan into their Shinmeisho No Waza (newly accepted techniques) list. It is categorized as a foot technique, Ashi-waza.

== Included Systems ==
- Judo
