= Ura gatame =

Judo technique

- Classification: Katame-waza
- Sub classification: Osaekomi-waza
- Kodokan: No

Technique name
- Rōmaji: Ura gatame
- Japanese: 裹固
- English: Back hold

Ura Gatame (裹固) is a mat hold described in the Canon Of Judo. Changes to the International Judo Federation Rules in October 2013 made it a legitimate hold (osaekomi) for competition. In 2017, it was added as an official named technique by the Kodokan. It can be used as a turtle turnover as demonstrated in The Essence Of Judo by Kyuzo Mifune. It is categorized as Katame-waza (grappling technique).

== Description ==
It is an immobilization technique in which tori controls uke with his back in a reverse position. With uke's back on the floor, Tori with his back under uke's belly, with one hand Tori holds uke's leg and with the other hand holding his own collar, wrapping uke's arm with his armpit.

== Similar techniques, variants, and aliases ==
English aliases:

- Back hold
