= Powerslam =

Wrestling move

A Powerslam or simply Slam is a professional wrestling body slam move in which the wrestler performing the slam falls face-down on top of the opponent. The use of the term "powerslam" usually refers to the front powerslam or the scoop powerslam.

== Variations ==
=== Fallaway slam ===
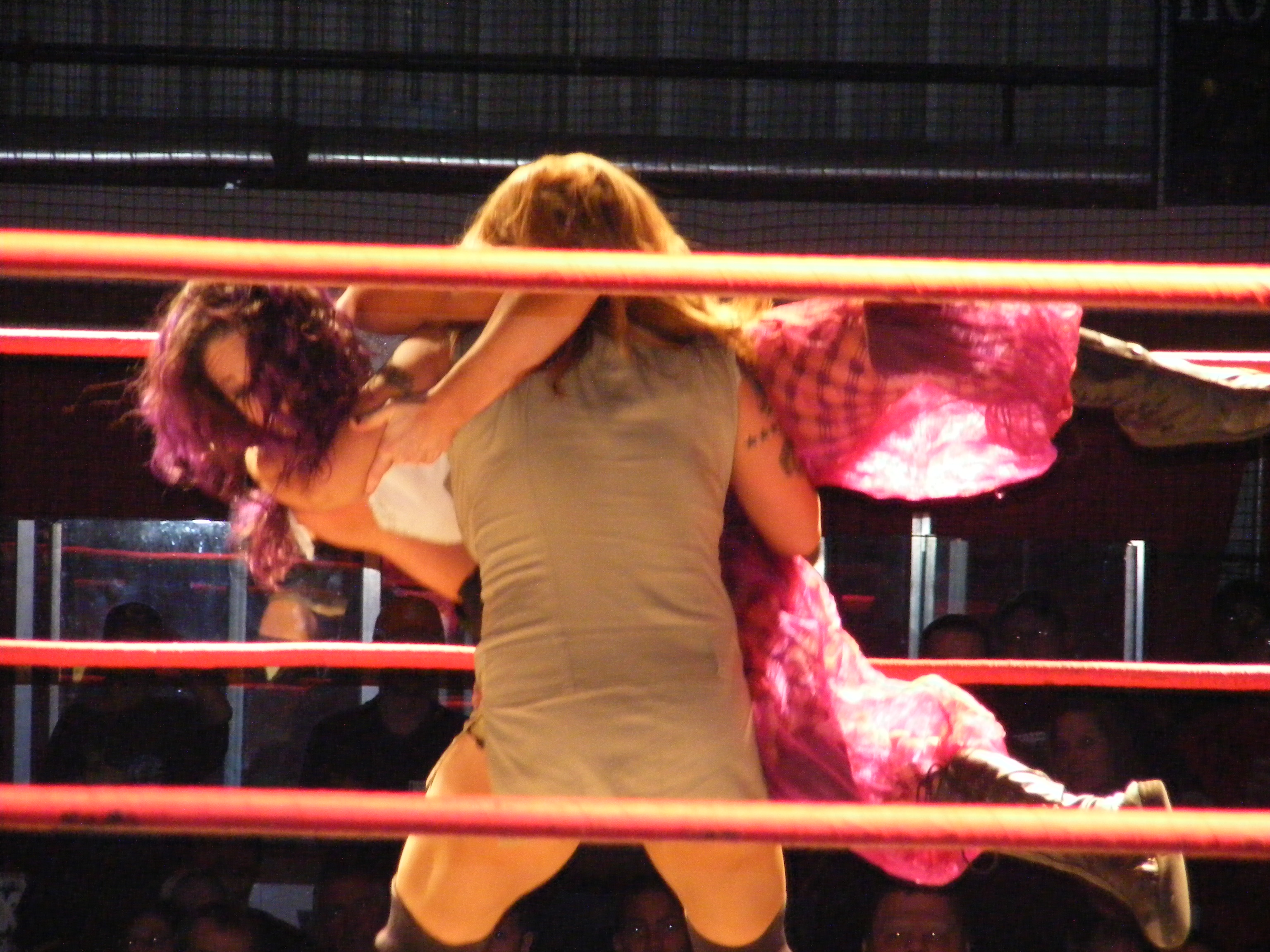
ODB performs a fallaway slam on Roxxie.

Also known as the S.O.S. or table-top suplex. The wrestler lifts the opponent up so the opponent is horizontal across the wrestler's body then falls backwards, throwing their opponent over their head down to the mat back-first. This slam can be either bridged into a pin, or the wrestler can float over into another fallaway slam. This move can be sometimes used as a continuation move from catching an opponent's high-cross body, to emphasize the wrestler's strength. Randy Orton, Titus O'Neil, Madcap Moss, John "Bradshaw/JBL" Layfield and Razor Ramon are its notable examples of users.

==== Fallaway moonsault slam ====
This move shows the wrestler grab an opponent like a fallaway slam but instead of just throwing them backwards the wrestler, while hanging onto the opponent, does a backflip slamming the opponent back-first into the mat while landing on top of them chest-first. The attacker may also choose to maintain their hold on the opponent after landing in an attempt to score a pinfall. This move was innovated by Scott Steiner and is currently used by Cameron Grimes primarily as a signature counter for a charging opponent performing a running crossbody. Grimes calls it Collision Course. This move requires a great deal of lower body strength and agility to perform as it can be dangerous to the wrestler performing the backflip as he/she/they can land head-first and risk serious injury from failing to rotate properly. "Hangman" Adam Page, Logan Paul, and Mandy Rose also use this move.

=== Falling powerslam ===
This move is also known as a falling slam or a reverse fallaway slam. Facing the opponent, the wrestler reaches between the opponent's legs with one arm and reaches around their back from the same side with the other arm. The wrestler lifts the opponent up so they are horizontal across the wrestler's body, then falls forward to slam the opponent against the mat back-first. Although not usually used as a finishing maneuver by most other competitors, Mark Henry uses the falling powerslam as his ending maneuver and refers to it as the World's Strongest Slam, playing off his claim to be the world's strongest man. An elevated version of this move is also possible. An inverted version exists, where the opponent is lifted from behind and slammed in a manner similar to a falling slam, only on their face/abdomen. The Boogeyman uses the inverted version as a finisher.

=== Fireman's carry powerslam ===
The wrestler lifts the opponent across their shoulders in a fireman's carry, grabs their right leg and pushes it up, and positions their torso across the wrestler's abdomen. The wrestler then falls forward, slamming the opponent down on their back in a front powerslam. It is used by Keith Lee as the Big Bang Catastrophe.

=== Front powerslam ===
The most common powerslam variation, it is also often referred to simply as a "powerslam". The attacking wrestler reaches between an opponent's legs with their stronger arm and reaches around their back from the same side with their weaker arm before then lifting the opponent up over their shoulder. From this position, the wrestler falls forward to slam the opponent against the mat back-first. An inverted variation of this maneuver also exists. Wrestlers often run forward as they slam, a move popularized by The British Bulldog who used it as his finishing move. Braun Strowman and Davey Boy Smith Jr. are modern examples of wrestlers using the running powerslam as a finisher.

=== Gorilla press powerslam ===
The move, also known as a military press powerslam or falling press slam, is similar to a gorilla press slam. The wrestler lifts the opponent up over their head with arms fully extended (as in the military press used in weight lifting), drops the opponent into an over-the shoulder-position, then runs and falls forward to slam the opponent against the mat back-first. Currently being used by WWE wrestler Bron Breakker.

=== Inverted sitout side powerslam ===
The attacking wrestler grabs the opponent's waist, as in a gutwrench, then hoist the opponent up onto one of their shoulders in an overhead gutwrench backbreaker rack. From this position, the attacking wrestler then sits down and simultaneously flips the opponent forwards and downwards, slamming them down to the ground face-first to one side. It was popularized by Yujiro Takahashi as Tokyo Pimps.

=== Oklahoma Stampede ===
It is simply known as The Oklahoma slam in which the wrestler reaches between the opponent's legs with their stronger arm and around the opponent's back from the same side with their weaker arm. The wrestler then lifts the opponent up over their shoulder, and runs towards the ring corner, slamming the opponent back-first on the turnbuckles. The wrestler keeps the hold and slams the opponent to the opposite corner as well. The wrestler then runs to the middle of the ring and falls down forward, driving the opponent back-first into the mat. This move was invented and named by Bill Watts. It was popularized by "Dr. Death" Steve Williams.

=== Scoop powerslam ===
This move is the second most common version of a powerslam and is often referred to as simply a "powerslam". The attacking wrestler places their stronger arm between an opponent's legs, and reach over the opponent's shoulder with their weaker arm. Then, the opponent is spun over onto their back while keeping the opponent horizontal across the wrestler's body at all times. As the opponent falls to the mat, the attacking wrestler will continue to fall face-down on top of them in a lateral press pinning position. This powerslam is usually performed on a charging opponent, using the opponent's own momentum to power the throw. Notable users of this move are Buzz Sawyer, Road Warrior Animal, Randy Orton, Samoa Joe, Cody and Dustin Rhodes and Braun Strowman. This move is called "Snap scoop powerslam" when performed very fast. It also has a spinning variation, where the user scoops their opponent, spins them and falls forward, slamming the opponent on the mat. Brock Lesnar used this move during his first run with WWE. An inverted version exists, where the opponent is lifted from behind, and slammed in a manner similar to a scoop powerslam, only onto their face/abdomen. Jeff Cobb uses a variation, where he spins him and his opponents a 360°, before executing the powerslam, dubbed as the Tour of the Islands. Former NXT rookie and Nexus member Michael Tarver also used a reverse spin scoop powerslam, similar to the "Tour of the Islands", but he calls it "Tarver's Lightning".

=== Side slam ===
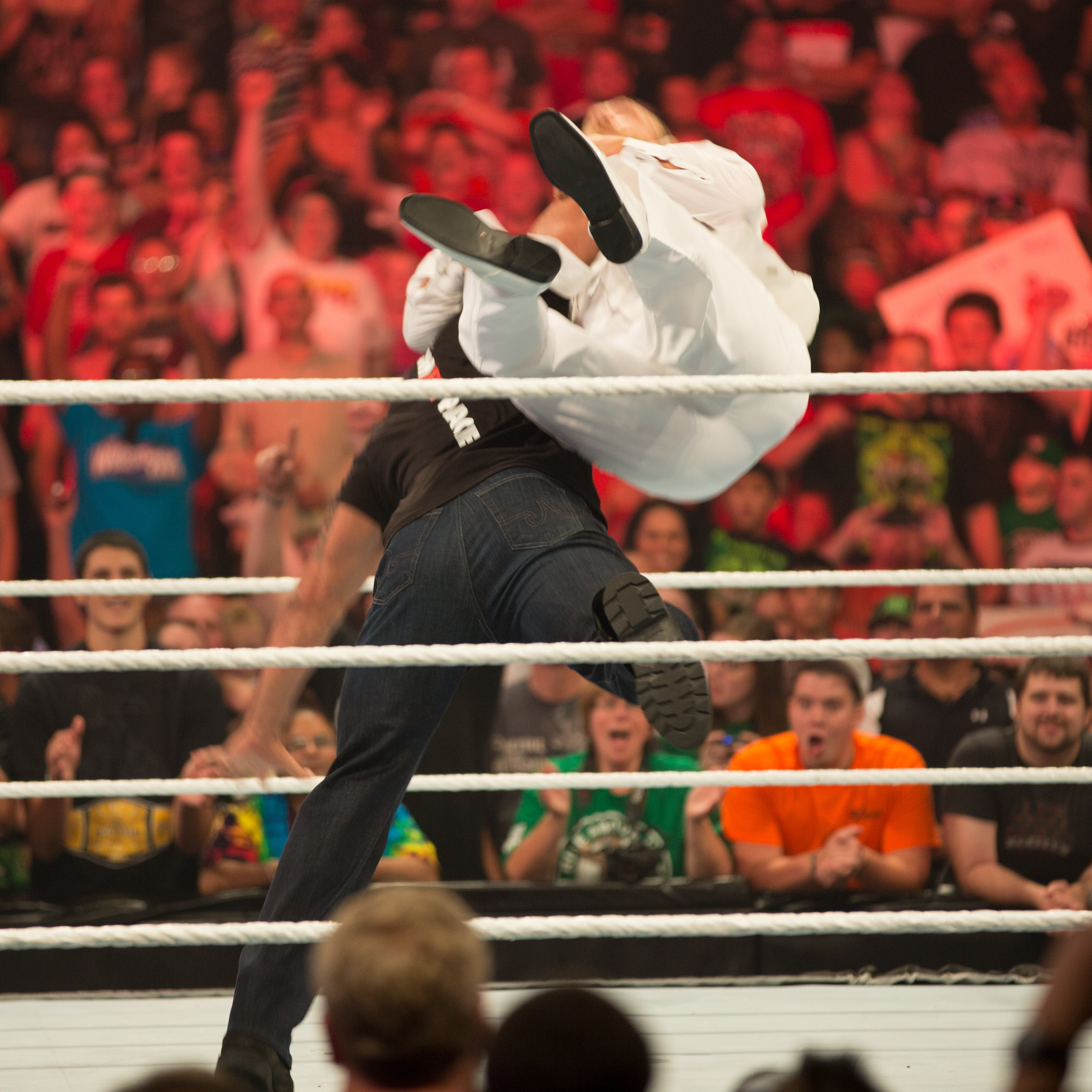
The Rock performing the Rock Bottom (side slam) on Daniel Bryan.

This move is commonly referred to as an ura-nage slam, or simply ura-nage. This name is an incorrect Americanization of the name for ura-nage, which, translated directly from Japanese, means "throw to behind". It has erroneously been translated as "reverse side throw". To perform it, the wrestler begins standing face to face with the opponent slightly to their side. Then, the wrestler tucks their own head under the opponent's near arm, reaches across the opponent's chest and around their neck with their near arm, and places the other arm against their back. The wrestler then falls forward, either flat on their chest or into a kneeling position, and forces the opponent back-first onto the mat. In another variation, the wrestler can also stay standing and body slam the opponent onto the mat, this is typically called a standing side slam. This standing version is used by Bray Wyatt, Roman Reigns, and also by Samoa Joe. The original version was innovated and popularized by Hiroshi Hase. The fall-forward variation was popularized by The Rock, who called it the Rock Bottom. The kneeling variation was performed by Booker T who calls it the Book End. Matt Hardy performs a sitout variation of it, called the Side Effect. The sitout side slam was also performed by former WWE star Mason Ryan. Becky Lynch uses this move calling it the Manhandle Slam.

==== Belly-to-back side slam ====
This move sees the wrestler stand behind the opponent, put their head under one of the opponent's arms, and lift the opponent into a belly-to-back suplex. The wrestler then pushes the opponent upwards before turning and transitioning into a side slam, so the opponent is dropped from an elevated position. The move is used as a finishing manoeuvre by Clark Connors, which he names the Trophy Kill. This move was also the finisher of former WCW/, WWF/E, and CMLL wrestler Mark Jindrak, which he dubbed Mark of Excellence. And a signature part of John Cena's "Five Moves of Doom" as the Protobomb.

==== Spinning side slam ====
This move is also referred to as a scrapbuster or a sidewalk slam. To perform it, the wrestler stands in front of the opponent with the opponent facing the same direction. The wrestler lift the opponent in front of them in a side powerslam position. The wrestler swings the opponent's legs to the opposite side before sitting down and slamming the opponent's back to the mat. Used by Abyss as the Black Hole Slam. Jon Moxley and Wade Barrett use this as their signature maneuver calling it the Moxicity (Moxley) and the Winds of Change (Barrett). This version was also used by the late Brodie Lee as "Truckstop". A kneeling version was also used by the Big Boss Man.

==== Standing moonsault side slam ====
This move is often erroneously described as a moonsault ura-nage slam. To perform it, an attacking wrestler stands slightly behind and facing the side of a standing opponent. The wrestler then reaches under the near arm of the opponent, across the chest of the opponent and under their far arm, while placing their other hand on the back of the opponent to hold them in place. The wrestler then performs a backwards somersault (moonsault) while holding the victim, driving the opponent into the mat back-first. This move can also be performed off the top rope and is known as a moonsault side slam or solo Spanish fly in reference to the Spanish fly double team move. The move was used by Paul Burchill and John Morrison, both of whom called the move C-4. A famous user of the move is Will Ospreay, who precedes it with a ripcord and calls it the Rainham Maker (in reference to Kazuchika Okada's Rainmaker).

==== Swinging side slam ====
Colt Cabana executing a swinging side slam

This move is also known as a wind-up slam. To perform it, the wrestler faces the opponent and reaches between the opponent's legs with one arm and around the back from the same side with the other arm. The wrestler then lifts the opponent up so they are horizontal across the wrestler's body. Next, the wrestler spins in a circle while swinging the lower half of the opponent's body out and around until one arm is across the opponent's chest and under one or both arms. The wrestler then falls forward, slamming the opponent into the mat back-first. In some variations of the move, the wrestler can hold the opponent up over their shoulder and throw the opponent round from that position, or hang the opponent across both their shoulders and throw out their legs behind them so the opponent swings back round to drop in a position. A sitout variant is used by CaZXL as the East River Crossing.

==== Uranage ====
This move is also known as a sambo suplex or side suplex. To perform it, the wrestler stands face-to-face with the opponent, slightly to their side. The wrestler tucks their head under the opponent's near arm, and reaches across the opponent's chest and around their neck with their near arm. The wrestler then simultaneously lifts the opponent up, turns 180° and falls forward, slamming the opponent back-first on the mat. As mentioned below, the move was popularized by Hiroshi Hase and more recently used by Jay White. The Spinning Variation also known as Spinning Solo used by Solo Sikoa.

Ura nage (or ura-nage) is the Japanese name of a Judo throw which, translated directly means "throw to behind/back" and is commonly (albeit incorrectly) used to refer to a regular side slam in pro wrestling. The Judo uranage throw more closely resembles a saito suplex in execution.

==== Vertical suplex side slam ====
In this elevated side slam variation, the wrestler grabs a front facelock on the opponent and wraps their arm over the opponent's neck. The wrestler then lifts the opponent upside down, as in a vertical suplex. The wrestler moves their arm from around the opponent's neck, and as the opponent falls back down, they are placed into a side slam position and dropped on the mat. This was formerly used by Hirooki Goto as Shouten, before using a sitout version called the Shouten Kai. He also invented the inverted variation called the Ura-Shouten. Former professional wrestler Matt Morgan used this move as a finisher during his tenure in TNA, calling it the Hellevator.

==== Waist-lift side slam ====
In this variation, an opponent lifts up an opponent by the waist and then slams them down back onto the mat like a powerslam. Lars Sullivan used this as a finisher during his time in the WWE, calling it the "Freak Accident". Erick Rowan also used this move as a finisher for short while in the WWE as well.

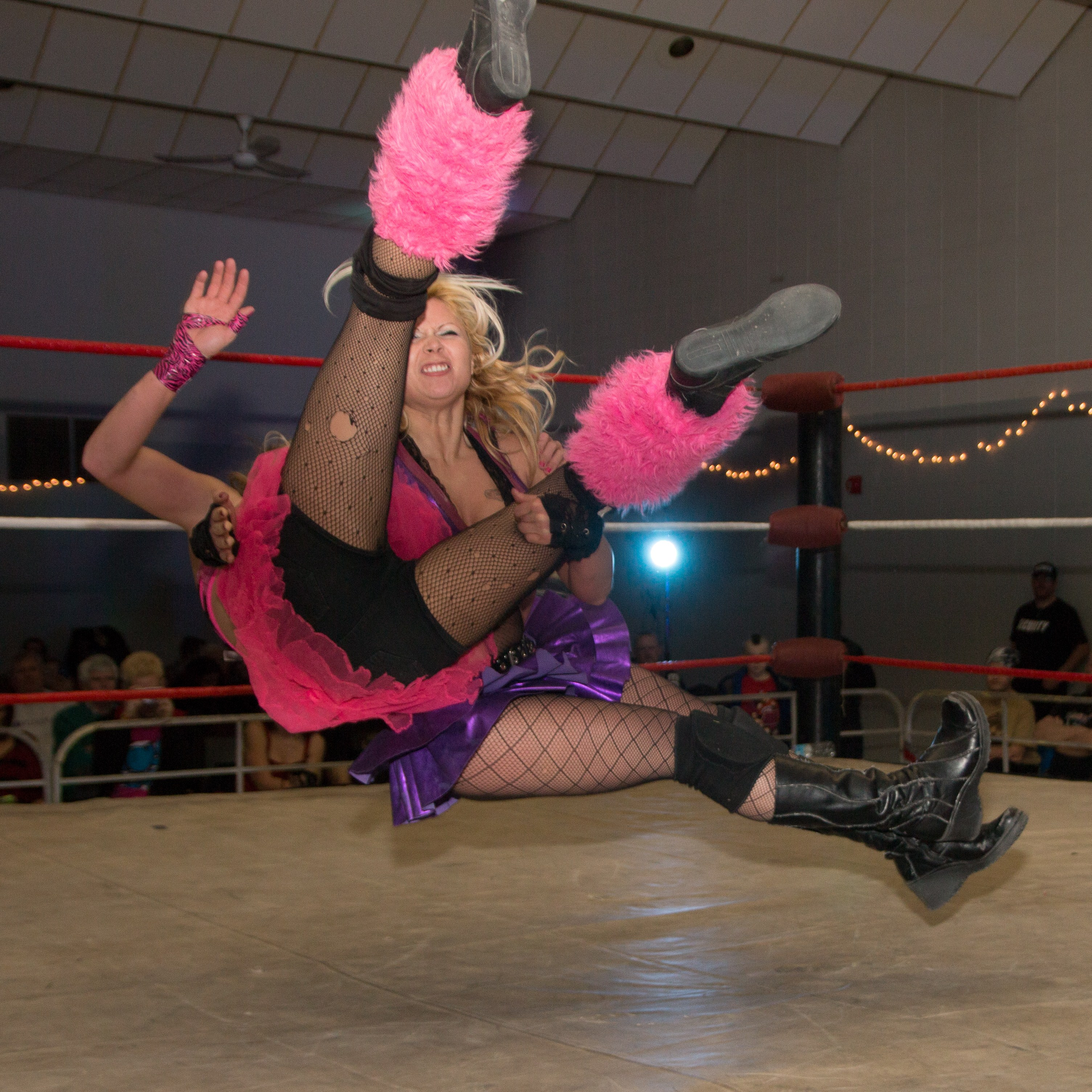
Jewells Malone performs a sidewalk slam on Beautiful Beaa (pink).

=== Sidewalk slam ===
Also known as side suplex. To perform this move, the wrestler stands side-to-side and slightly behind, with the opponent facing in the same direction. The wrestler then reaches around the opponent's torso with their near arm across the opponent's chest and under both arms and the other arm under the opponent's legs. The wrestler then lifts the opponent, bringing their legs off the ground, and falls down to the mat in a sitting position, slamming the opponent into the mat back-first. A one-armed variation is also possible, usually performed on smaller wrestlers.

=== Sitout side powerslam ===
The users lifts their opponent up on their right shoulder, as in a front powerslam. Then, the left arm is wrapped around the opponent's neck and the right arm is wrapped around the opponent's torso. The user then sits down while dropping the opponent vertically to the right side, driving the opponent neck-and-shoulder first into the mat. This move was invented by Mitsuharu Misawa, calling it Emerald Flowsion. Another variation is the elevated position: the user puts the opponent into a front powerslam, then jumps off either the second or third turnbuckle, driving the opponent into a typical sitout side powerslam position. Samoa Joe used this move calling it Island Driver. Tetsuya Naito innovated a variation of the move, where the sitout side powerslam is preceded by a lifting hammerlock cradle hold, dubbed as Gloriá. Naomichi Marufuji invented a butterfly variation, called Tiger Flowsion. Gunther uses a variation of the move that slams the opponent flat on their back as his finisher called The Last Symphony.

=== Suplex powerslam ===
The wrestler applies a front facelock, throws the opponent's near arm over the wrestler's shoulder, and then grabs the opponent's tights to lift them up straight in the air (as in a standard vertical suplex). When the wrestler begins to drop the opponent to the mat, the wrestler will twist to fall face-down on top of the opponent, hooking the leg for a pin. The move was innovated by Jaguar Yokota in the 1980s, but was popularized by Bill Goldberg in WCW, who called it the Jackhammer. Nia Jax also uses this move.

Another variation of the maneuver involves the wrestler applying the front facelock, and throwing the opponent's near arm over the wrestler's shoulder, and then lifting the opponent into a suplex position, before placing the opponent on one shoulder in a front powerslam position, then falling forward to slam the opponent against the mat back-first.

== See also ==
- Professional wrestling throws
