= Turtle flip over =

Judo technique

Turtle Flip Over
- Classification: Katame-waza
- Sub classification: Turtle turnovers
- Kodokan: No

Technique name
- Rōmaji: Kame ura-gaeshi
- Japanese: 亀裏返し
- English: Turtle flip over

Turtle Flip Over is a turtle turnover demonstrated in The Essence Of Judo by Kyuzo Mifune, and it is an unnamed technique described in The Canon Of Judo. It is not recognized as an official technique by the Kodokan, however, it falls under the classification of Katame-waza (grappling technique).

== Technique description ==
The main characteristic of the Turtle Flip Over is tori's lift of uke's one side to turn uke.

== Included systems ==
- Judo
- Brazilian jiu-jitsu

== See also ==
- Judo techniques by type
