= Ganseki otoshi =

Judo technique

- Classification: Throw
- Style: Judo
- AKA: Rock drop

Ganseki Otoshi is a hand throw in judo. It is described in The Canon Of Judo as a reference technique and demonstrated by Kyuzo Mifune in the video The Essence of Judo.
