= Te Guruma =

Judo technique

- Classification: Nage-waza
- Sub classification: Te-waza
- Kodokan: No

Technique name
- Rōmaji: Te Guruma
- Japanese: 手車
- English: Hand wheel

Te Guruma (手車) is a throwing technique described in The Canon Of Judo as a reference technique and demonstrated by Kyuzo Mifune in the video The Essence of Judo. It is currently illegal in competition as of the 2011 IJF rule changes.

== Included systems ==
Lists:

- The Canon Of Judo
- Judo technique

== Similar techniques, variants, and aliases ==
Similar techniques:

- Comparable to some variants of sukui nage

Aliases:

- Hand wheel
