= Brazilian Jiu-Jitsu: Theory and Technique =

Book on Brazilian jiu jitsu

- Author: Renzo Gracie, Royler Gracie, Kid Peligro, John Danaher
- Illustrator: Ricardo Azoury
- Language: English
- Genre: Martial Arts
- Publisher: Invisible Cities Press
- Publication date: 2001
- Media type: Print
- Pages: 255
- ISBN: 1-931229-08-2
- OCLC: 47225109
- Dewey Decimal: 796.815 21
- LC Class: GV1114 .G73 2001

Brazilian Jiu-Jitsu: Theory and Technique is a book first published in 2001, co-authored by Renzo Gracie, Royler Gracie, Kid Peligro and John Danaher and illustrated by Ricardo Azoury. It was written on the request of Sheik Tahnoon Bin Zayed Al Nayan, creator of the ADCC.

The book describes the "paradigm shift in the martial arts in favor of grappling styles" as a result of MMA events, such as UFC 1, in the early 1990s. It explains the theoretical foundations of Brazilian Jiu-Jitsu as a search for a solution to the fundamental problem of the Martial arts, which it defines as "How can one successfully defend oneself against attack by a bigger, stronger, and more aggressive opponent?"

The book traces Brazilian Jiu-Jitsu's lineage to Mitsuyo Maeda, a student of Jigoro Kano, who taught his style of Judo to Carlos Gracie. From then, the Gracie clan further develops Jiu-Jitsu independently from the Kodokan. The book further explains how Brazilian Jiu-Jitsu differentiates itself from Judo.

The book explains that Brazilian Jiu-Jitsu does not have a set standard list of techniques or belt requirements, but that each school informally ranks their students according to actual fighting proficiency. Nonetheless, the book then sets some guidelines as to what a typical Brazilian Jiu-Jitsu school might expect from a student at each belt rank; Blue, Purple, Brown, and Black.

Finally, the book describes its model of a typical fight and what a Brazilian Jiu-Jitsu fight looks like.
