= O uchi gari =

Throwing techniques

O uchi gari 大内刈
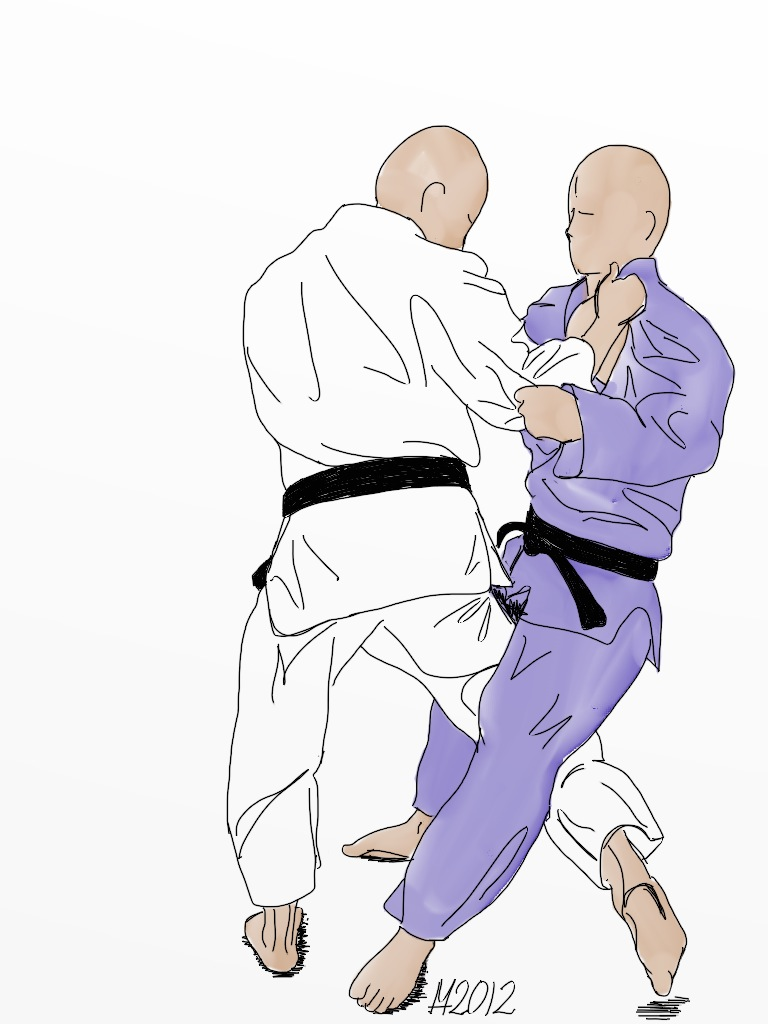
- An illustration of o uchi gari. The judoka in white is the one performing the technique, performing the reap with their right leg.
- Classification: Nage-waza
- Sub classification: Ashi-waza
- Targets: Leg
- Kodokan: Yes

Technique name
- Rōmaji: O uchi gari
- Japanese: 大内刈
- English: Major inner reap, or large/big inner reap
- Korean: 안다리 후리기

O uchi gari (大内刈) ("major inner reap") is one of the original 40 throws of Judo as developed by Kanō Jigorō. It belongs to the first group, Dai Ikkyo, of the traditional throwing list, Gokyo (no waza), of Kodokan Judo. It is also included in the current 67 Throws of Kodokan Judo. It is classified as a foot technique, Ashi-Waza.

== Technique description ==
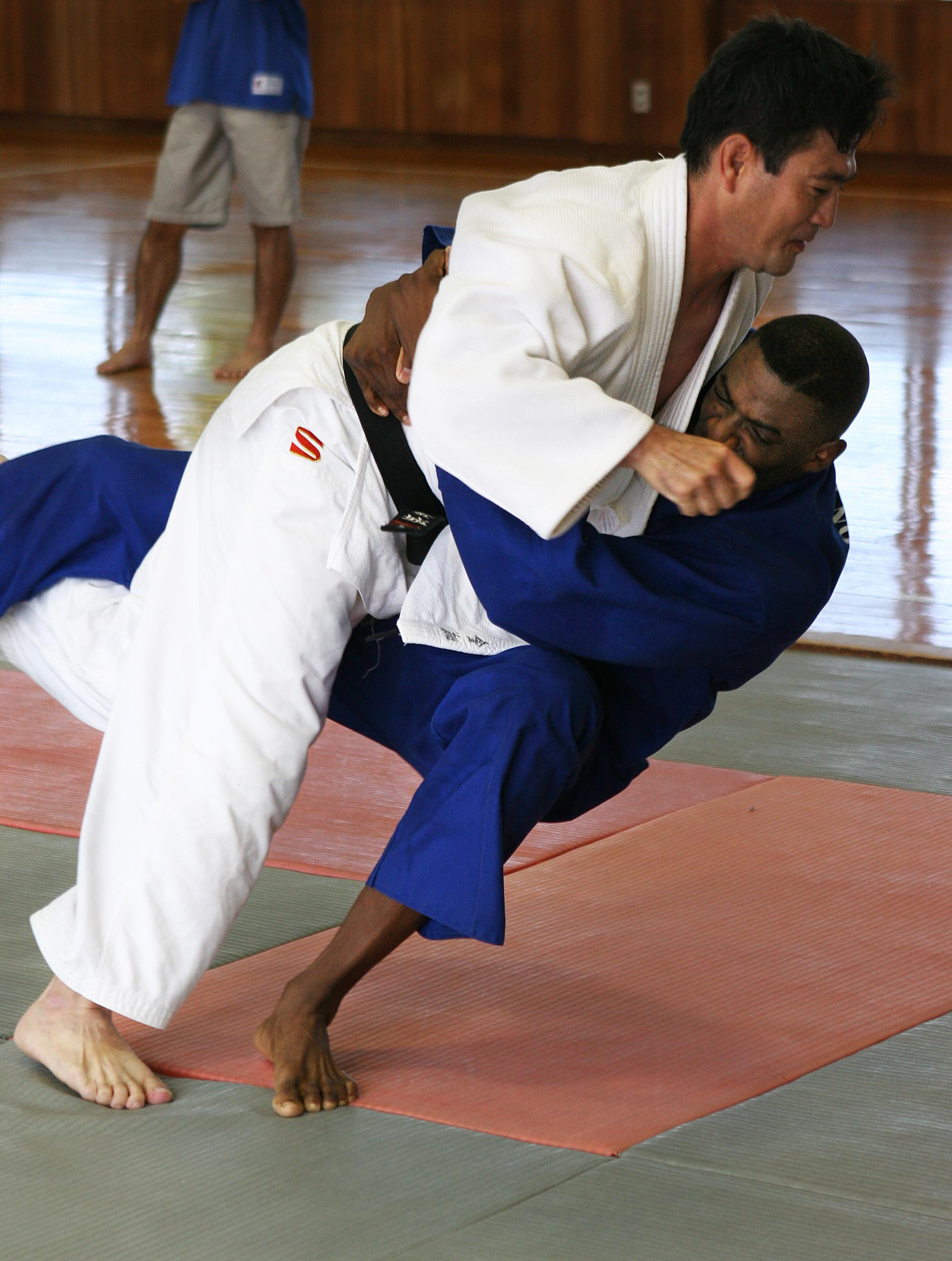
A demonstration of o uchi gari. The judoka in white is the one performing the throw, reaping with their left leg.

In o uchi gari, the tori (attacker) uses their leg to reap the leg of uke (the one being thrown) from the inside, while simultaneously using their hands to pull/push uke toward the ground.

In competition, the reaping action of the classical variation is sometimes replaced with a hooking or lifting motion, and the left hand can be used to lift or block uke's other leg while reaping the other.

== See also ==
- O soto gari (major outer reap)
- Ko uchi gari (minor inner reap)
