= Yoko wakare =

Judo technique

Yoko wakare 横分
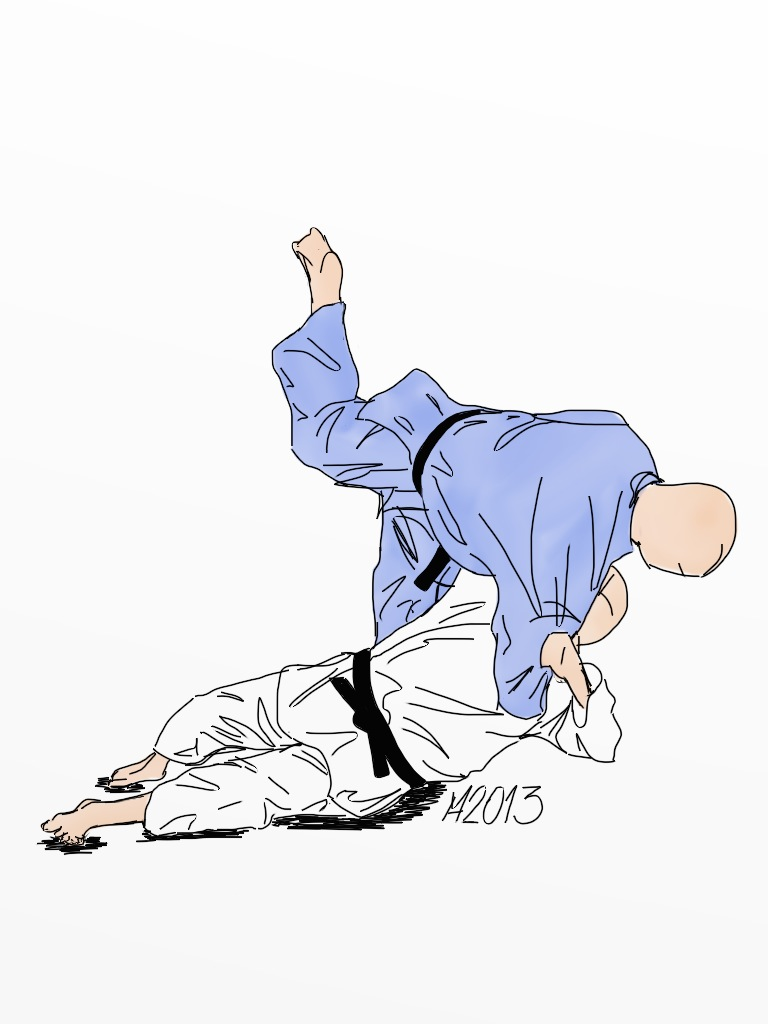
- Pen and ink Yoko-wakare illustration
- Classification: Nage-waza
- Sub classification: Sutemi-waza
- Kodokan: Yes

Technique name
- Rōmaji: Yoko wakare
- Japanese: 横分
- English: Side separation
- Korean: 옆으로 누우며 던지기

Yoko wakare (横分) is one of the original 40 throws of Judo as developed by Jigoro Kano. It belongs to the fifth group,

Gokyo, of the traditional throwing list, Gokyo (no waza), of Kodokan Judo. It is also part of the current 67 Throws of Kodokan Judo. It is classified as a side sacrifice technique, Yoko-sutemi.

== Technique description ==
The person performing the technique (tori) pushes his opponent (uke) until uke resists and pushes back. At the moment of maximum forward push by uke, tori falls quickly to the mat directly in front of, close to, and perpendicular to the feet of uke. While dropping, tori rotates his body to pull uke over him and to the ground. As a sacrifice throw, tori is putting himself into a vulnerable position on the mat so the timing must be such that uke is quickly thrown over tori and has no chance to drop down onto tori.

== Included systems ==
Systems:

- Kodokan Judo, Judo Lists

Lists:

- The Canon Of Judo
- Judo technique

== Similar techniques, variants, and aliases ==
English aliases:

- Side separation

=== Ude gaeshi ===
Ude gaeshi is considered to be a variation of yoko wakare. It is demonstrated by Kyuzo Mifune in The Essence of Judo and described in The Canon Of Judo.
