= Ura nage =

Judo technique

Ura nage 裏投
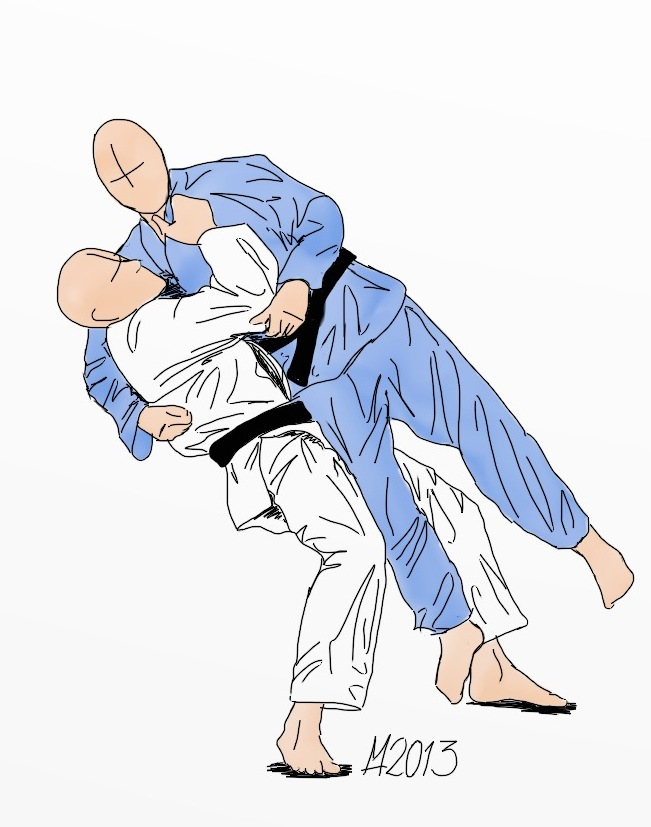
- An illustration of ura nage
- Classification: Nage-waza
- Sub classification: Sutemi-waza
- Kodokan: Yes

Technique name
- Rōmaji: Ura nage
- Japanese: 裏投
- English: Rear throw
- Korean: 누우면서 던지기

Ura Nage (裏投) is one of the original 40 throws of Judo as developed by Jigoro Kano. It belongs to the fifth group, Gokyo, of the traditional throwing list, Gokyo (no waza), of Kodokan Judo. It is also part of the current 67 Throws of Kodokan Judo. It is classified as a rear sacrifice technique, Ma-sutemi. Ura nage is similar to a suplex in wrestling.

== Description ==
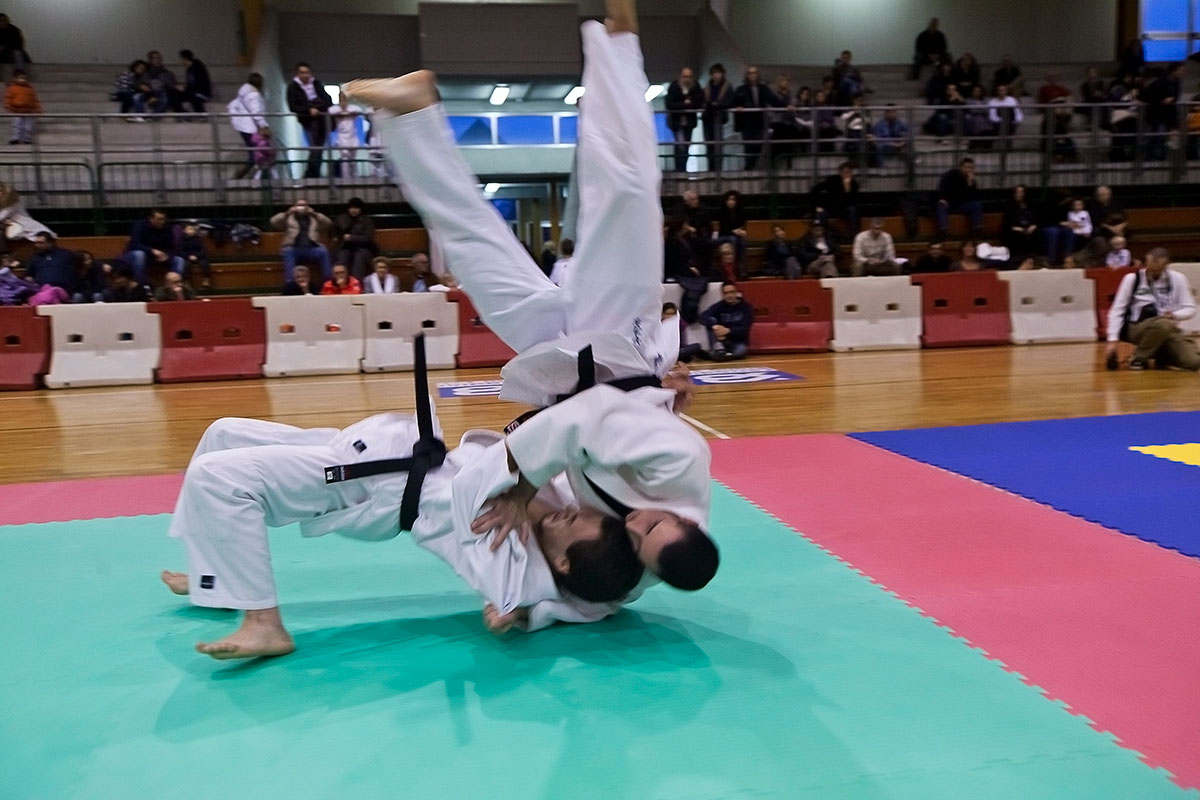
A demonstration of ura nage

In the Nage No Kata, Ura nage is demonstrated as a response to a striking technique. Uke advances on Tori, striking downward towards Tori's forehead. Tori will respond to the strike by stepping forward and into Uke's armpit to avoid the strike and close distance with Uke. While stepping forward, Tori will lower their body weight and step one foot past uke's hip and the other foot inwards between uke's legs. Tori will then place a hand on the back of Uke's belt and the other hand on Uke's abdomen. While pressing upwards with hands and hips, Tori will move the foot between uke's leg inward while dropping shoulders towards the mat behind them. Tori's hips should not touch the mat. Uke will be thrown over Tori's shoulder and will maintain tension in their posture to avoid drooping or falling onto Tori during the throw.
