= Throw (grappling) =

Martial arts term for a grappling technique

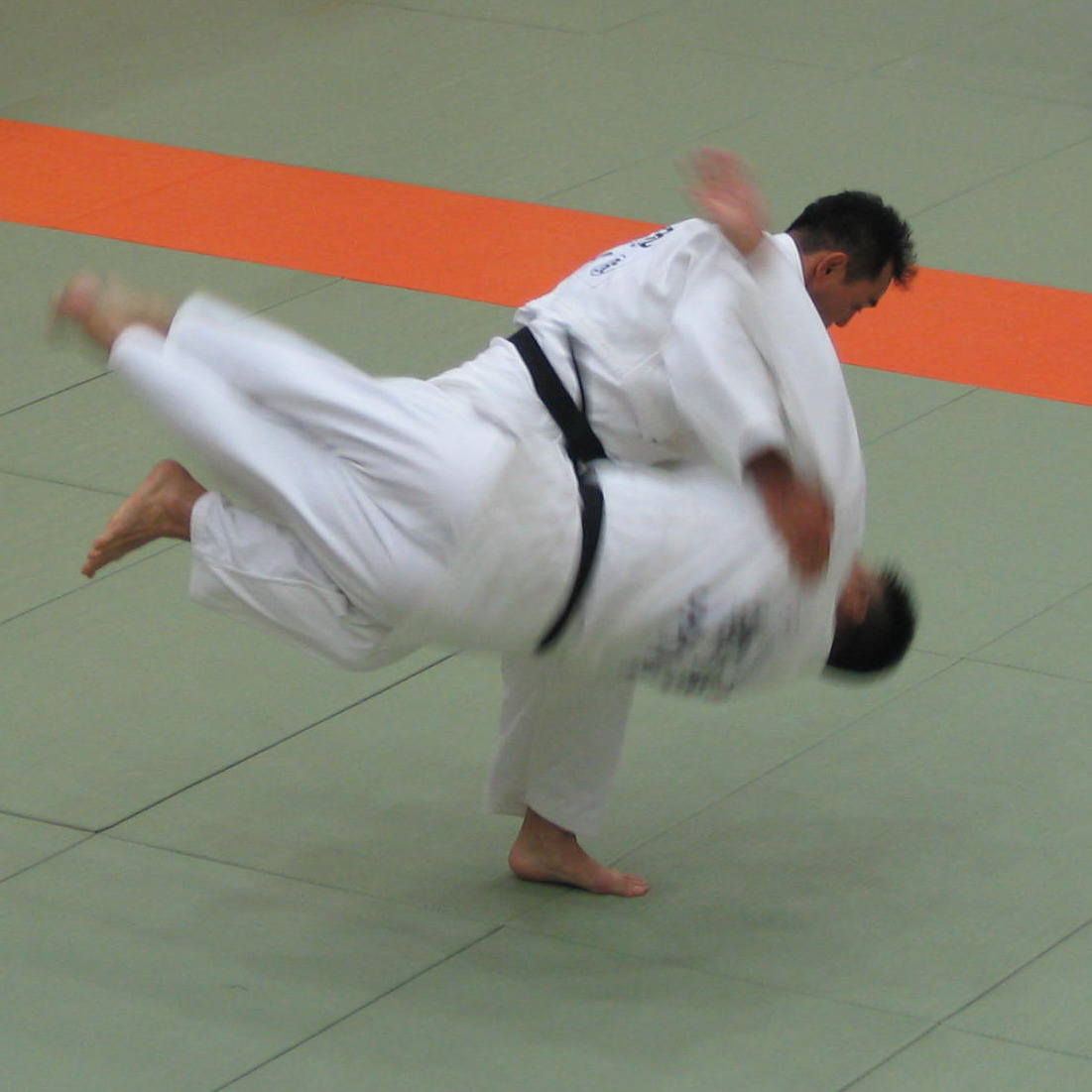
A demonstration of the judo throw harai goshi

In martial arts, a throw is a grappling technique that involves off-balancing or lifting an opponent, and throwing them to the ground. Throws are a subset of takedown (grappling). In Japanese martial arts throws are referred to as nage waza, 投げ技, "throwing technique(s)".

== Types of throws ==
There are several major types of throws. Most throws are named by describing the circumvention point of the throw (e.g., hip throw, shoulder throw, wrist throw etc.), or the nature of effect of the throw on the opponent (e.g., heaven and earth throw, valley drop, body drop) with variations being given descriptive names. The names used here are attributed to Jujutsu throws (and hence judo/Aikido throws) are descriptions in Japanese. It is conventional for the Japanese to name their throws in this manner, and many western martial art dojos have given English names to the throws feeling that it is easier for English speaking students to remember the names of throws if they can associate the throws by the descriptive nature of the throw name.

Judo has the most developed throwing techniques and throws are considered its specialty. In Judo, throws are divided into six categories—hand techniques, leg techniques, hip techniques, shoulder techniques, as well as sacrifice throws to the rear and side.

=== Shoulder and back throws ===
A demonstration of the judo throw seoi nage.

A shoulder throw involves throwing an opponent over the shoulder. A shoulder throw which lifts the opponent from the ground is in Japanese referred to as seoi-nage (背負い投げ, "shoulder throw" or "over the back throw"), while a throw which involves upsetting the opponent’s balance and pulling the opponent over the shoulder is referred to as seoi-otoshi (背負落とし, "shoulder drop"). Seoi-nage is one of the most used throws in judo competition. One study indicated that approximately 56% of judokas implemented the technique.

A common shoulder throw is judo's ippon seoinage ("single-handed shoulder throw") or the similar flying mare in wrestling.

=== Leg throws, reaps, and trips ===
The judo throw tai otoshi demonstrated by Laszlo Horvath

In a leg reap, the attacker uses one of their legs to reap one or both of their opponent's legs off the ground. Generally the opponent's weight is placed on the leg that is reaped away. This coupled with the attacker controlling the opponent's body with their hands causes the opponent to fall over. Common leg reaps are judo's o uchi gari, ko uchi gari, o soto gari, and ko soto gari. There are similar techniques in wrestling, including the inside and outside trips.

Somewhat similar to leg reaps involve a hooking or lifting action with the attacking leg instead of a reaping action. The border between the two types of throw can be unclear, and many throws will exhibit characteristics of both reaps and trips, however, the difference is that a reap is one smooth move, like that of a scythe, whereas a hook is pulling the opponents leg up first, and then swinging it away. Common leg trips are hooking variations of Ouchi Gari and Osoto Gari along with Kosoto Gake, referred to as inside and outside trips in Western wrestling.

=== Sacrifice throws ===
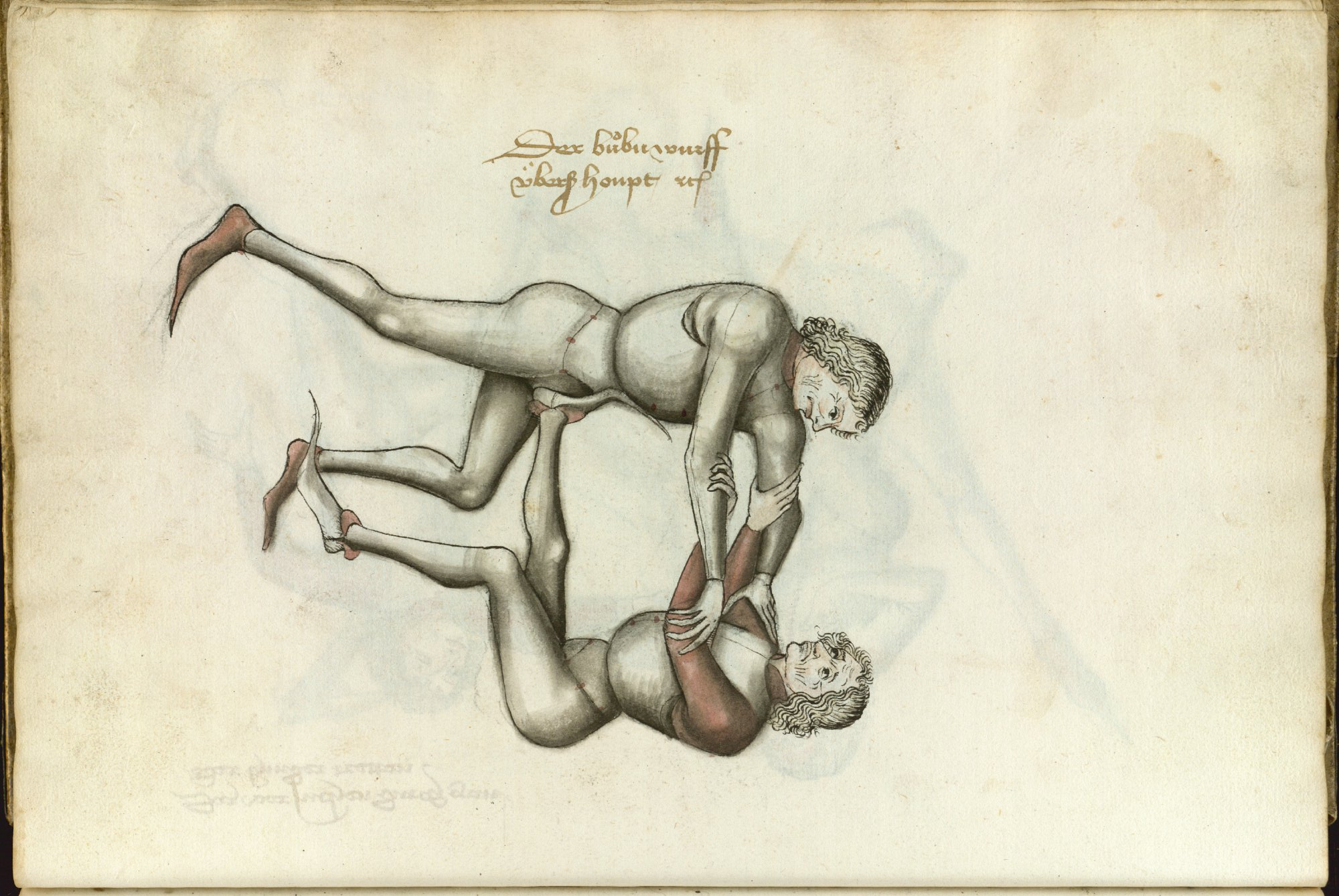
A sacrifice throw depicted in a fencing manual written in 1459 by Hans Talhoffer. It is very similar to the judo throw tomoe nage.

Sacrifice throws require the thrower to move into a potentially disadvantageous position in order to be executed, usually involving the thrower falling to the ground themselves. The momentum of the falling body adds power to the throw and requires less physical strength than some other throws. In Judo (and some other martial arts) these throws are called by the Japanese term sutemi waza (捨身技) and are further divided into rear (ma sutemi waza) and side (yoko sutemi waza) sacrifice throws. In Judo, these throws are limited to a specific grade and higher due to the element of danger that is placed upon both the uke (receiver) and the tori (thrower).

=== Hip throws ===
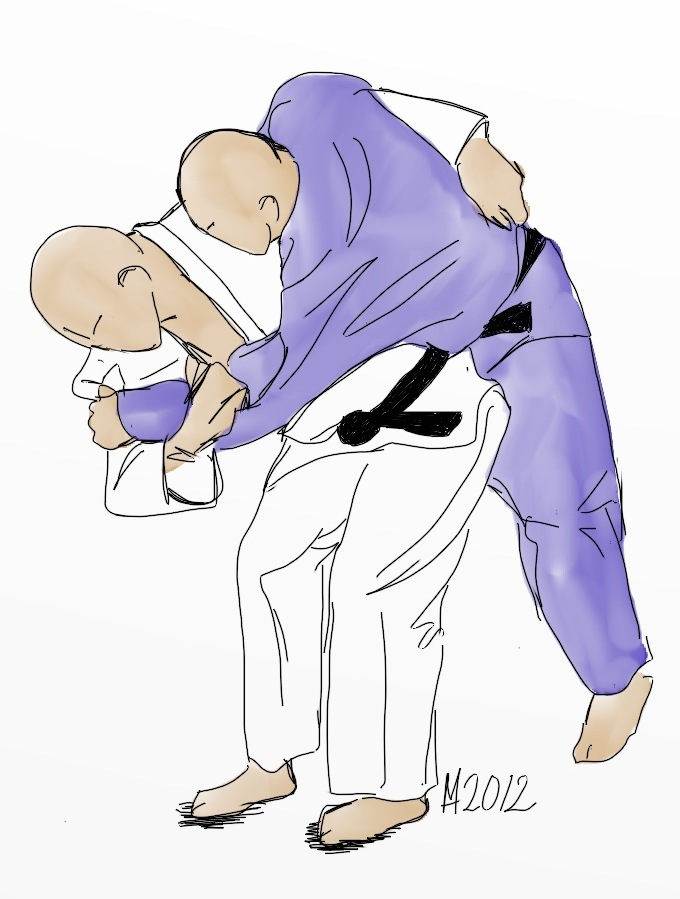
An illustration of the judo throw o goshi

A hip throw involves using the thrower's hip as a pivot point, by placing the hip in a lower position than an opponent's center of gravity. There are several types of hip throws such as O Goshi, which is often taught first to novices. Hip throws in Judo are called Koshi Waza, and in Aikido or Sumo they are called koshinage.

=== Pick-ups ===
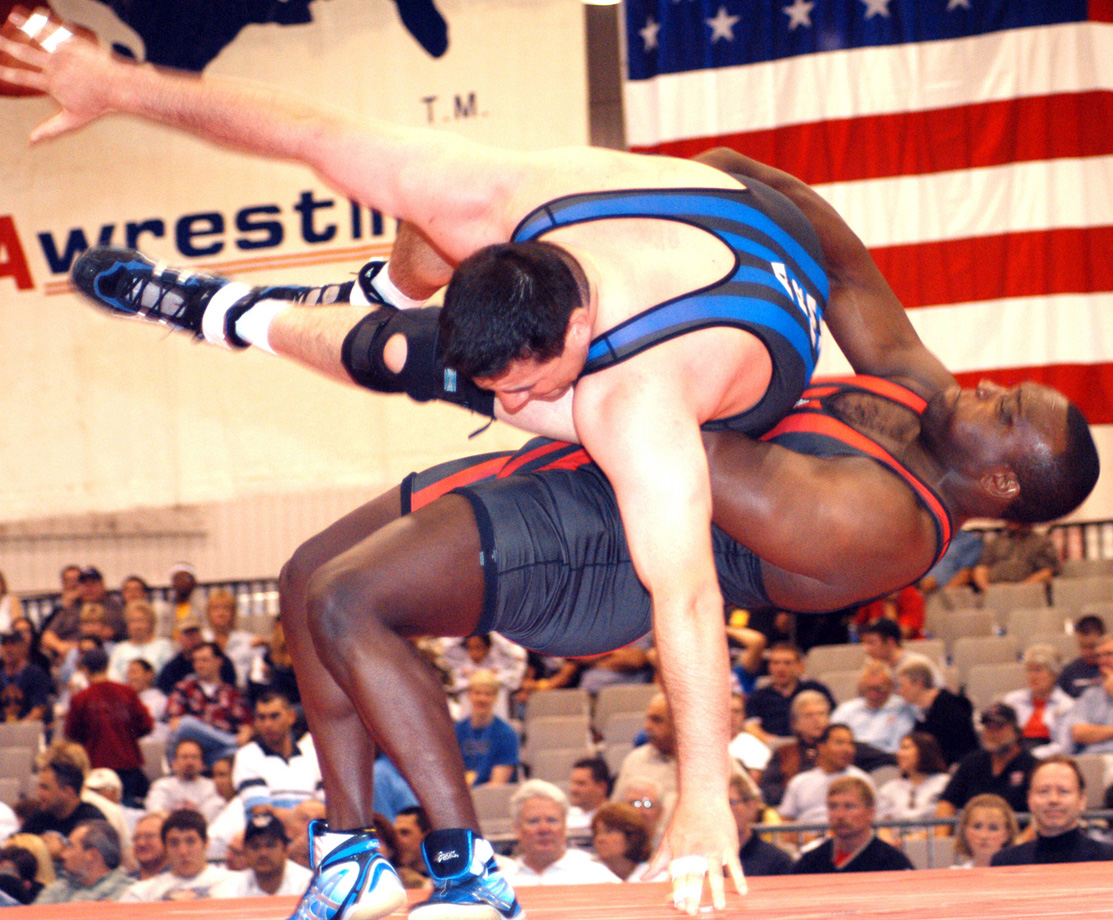
A suplex in a wrestling competition

Pickups involve lifting the opponent off the ground and then bringing them down again. Common pick-ups are lifting variations of the double leg takedown, Judo's Te Guruma or sukui nage (both classified as hand throws Ganseki otoshi) and the suplex from wrestling, in which the attacker lifts their opponents body vertically and throws the opponent over their own center of gravity while executing a back fall (usually accompanied by a back arch). Variations of the suplex are common in most forms of wrestling and sometimes used in mixed martial arts competition. In Judo, the ura-nage throw is a version of the suplex, but it is classified as a sacrifice throw.

== List of throws ==
Some of the more common throwing techniques are listed below. This is not an exhaustive list and the techniques may be referred to by other names in different styles. An English translation and a common Japanese equivalent are given.

- Major hip throw (O Goshi)
- Floating hip (Uki Goshi)
- Rear hip throw (Ushiro Goshi)
- Stamp throw
- Major wheel (O Guruma)
- Transitional hip throw (Utsuri Goshi)
- Hip wheel (Koshi Guruma)
- Sweeping hip throw (Harai Goshi)
- Inner Thigh throw (Uchi Mata)
- Sweeping knee throw
- Sweeping ankle throw
- Leg wheel (Ashi Guruma)
- Major outer wheel (Osoto Guruma)
- Inside hook throw (Kouchi Gake)
- Outer hook throw
- Cross hook
- Knee wheel (Hiza Guruma)
- Advancing foot sweep (Deashi Harai)
- Lapel Back throw (Eri Seoinage/kata eri seoi nage)
- Single-Handed Shoulder throw (Ippon Seoinage)
- Double-Handed Shoulder throw (Morote Seoinage)
- Major inner reaping, inside trip (Ouchi Gari)
- Minor inner reaping (Kouchi Gari)
- Major outer reaping, outside trip (Osoto Gari)
- Minor outer reap (Kosoto Gari)
- Minor outer hook (Kosoto Gake)
- Propping ankle throw (Sasae Tsurikomi Ashi)
- Floating hip throw (Uki Goshi)
- Body drop (Tai Otoshi)
- Lifting hip throw (Tsuri Goshi)
- Sleeve lifting-pulling hip throw (Sode Tsurikomi Goshi)
- Floating drop (Uki Otoshi)
- Outside wrap (Soto Makikomi)
- Inside wrap (Uchi Makikomi)
- Springing hip throw (Hane Goshi)
- Double spring hip throw.
- Shoulder wheel, fireman's carry (Kata Guruma)
- Valley drop (Tani Otoshi)
- Stomach throw (Tomoe Nage)
- Side circle
- Corner throw
- Head hip and knee throw
- Reverse head hip and knee throw
- Rear head hip and knee throw
- Front scoop throw
- Rear scoop throw
- Neck throw (Kubi Nage)
- Flying scissors takedown (Kani Basami)
- Flying figure ten (Tobi Juji Gatame)
- Wrist-based throws, especially Kotegaeshi (forearm return / supinating wrist lock)
- Figure ten throw (Juji nage, not closely related to Juji Gatame)
- Breath throw (Kokyu Nage, sometimes called timing throw or the twenty-year throw)
- Rotary throw (Kaiten nage, sometimes called head-over-heels throw)
- Heaven-and-earth throw (Tenchi nage)
- Four corner throw (Shiho nage, not to be confused with Corner Drop)
- Entering throw (Irimi nage, sometimes also simply called Kokyu nage (it's a specific variant))

== See also ==
- List of judo techniques
