= Kodokan Judo Institute =

Judo headquarters building in Tokyo, Japan

Coordinates: 35.7076186°N 139.7534024°E

Kodokan Judo Institute (講道館)
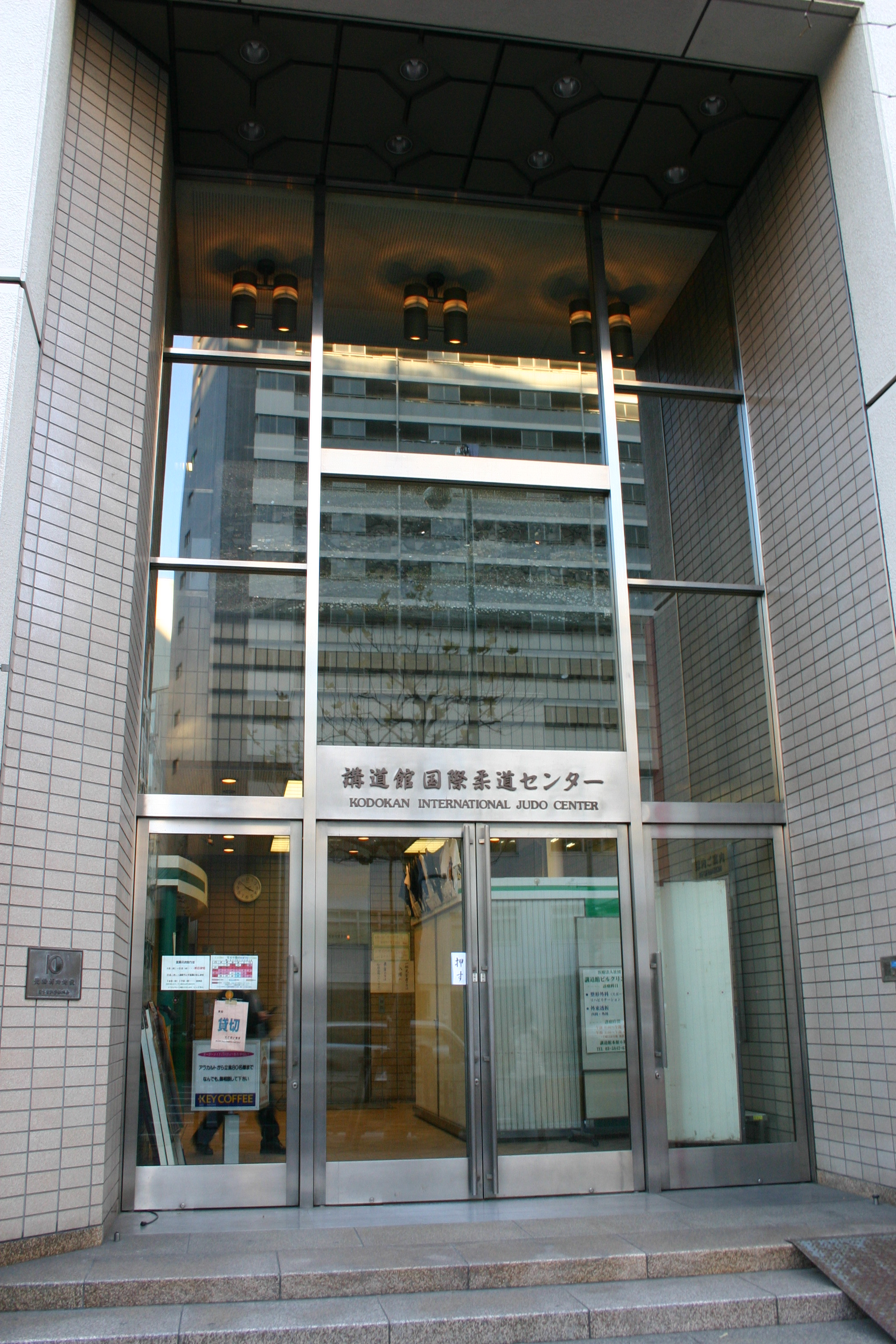
- The Kodokan Institute's main entrance
- Date founded: 1882
- Country of origin: Japan
- Founder: Kanō Jigorō
- Arts taught: Judo
- Ancestor schools: Tenjin Shin'yō-ryū and Kito-ryū
- Practitioners: Kyuzo Mifune, Keiko Fukuda, Masahiko Kimura, Gene LeBell, Anton Geesink, Yasuhiro Yamashita, Neil Adams, Hidehiko Yoshida, Vladimir Putin, Kosei Inoue, Minoru Mochizuki, Ronda Rousey, Mitsuyo Maeda
- Official website: kdkjudo.org

The Kodokan Judo Institute (公益財団法人講道館), or Kōdōkan (講道館), is the headquarters of the worldwide judo community. The kōdōkan was founded in 1882 by Kanō Jigorō, the founder of judo, and is now an eight-story building in Tokyo.

== Etymology ==
Literally, kō (講) means "to lecture", dō (道) means "way," and kan (館) is "a public building". Together it can be translated as "a place for the study of the way."

== Function ==
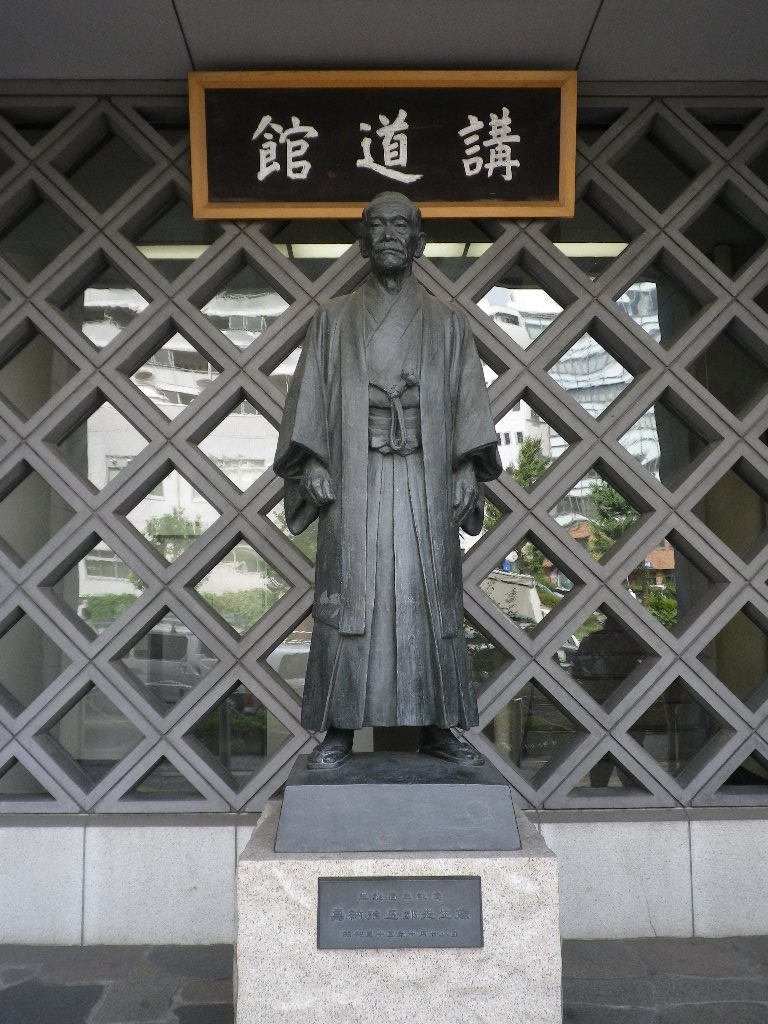
Statue of Kanō Jigorō at the institute

The Kodokan Institute offers classes for those who want to master judo. The program is authorized as a non-regular school by the Tokyo Metropolitan Government. Its courses include the theories and practice of judo, and matters of general education. The course is divided into two parts: a general course for novices, and special courses for those who have completed the general course or its equivalent.

The Kodokan also issues ranks, and many judoka (practitioners of judo) around the world become Kodokan members and have their ranks registered with the Kodokan.

The institute was founded with only nine disciples. The growth of judo in its early years is demonstrated by the growth of the Kodokan itself:

- 12 mats – May 1882, at the Eishōji, a Buddhist temple in Ueno
- 40 mats – Spring 1887, at Shinagawa's house, Kōjimachi
- 107 mats – February 1894, at Koishikawa-chō, Shimotomisaka-chō
- 314 mats – January 1898, at Ōtsuka Sakashita-chō
- 986 mats – March 1958, at 2-chome, Kasuga-chō, Bunkyō, Tokyo

Today, the Kodokan has 1,206 mats across the five main dojo (training halls)—Main, School, International, Women's, and Boys'—plus a special dojo for retired judoka and special technique study purposes.

List of presidents
#	President	Term
1	Kano Jigoro Shihan	1882–1938
2	Jirō Nangō	1938–1946
3	Risei Kano	1946–1980
4	Yukimitsu Kano	1980–2009
5	Haruki Uemura	2009–

== History ==
Women have trained in the Kodokan since 1926, but originally always separately from men. In 1962, after "pulverizing" the other students in the women's training group, Rena Kanokogi became the first woman allowed to train in the men's group at the Kodokan.

In November 1972, following a letter campaign against the rule prohibiting women from being promoted to higher than 5th dan, Keiko Fukuda and her senpai Masako Noritomi (1913–1982) became the first women promoted to 6th dan by the Kodokan.

In 1994 Keiko Fukuda became the first woman to be awarded a rare red belt (at the time for women still marking the 8th dan rank) in judo by the Kodokan.

In 2006 the Kodokan awarded Keiko Fukuda the 9th degree black belt (9th dan), making her the first woman to hold this rank from any recognized judo organization.

== Building ==
There are eight floors and a basement to the Kodokan dojo, each serving purposes for housing, training, and research by judoka. The basement holds the cafeteria and some conference rooms. The first floor has parking, a bank, and a store. The second floor contains a library and more conference rooms. The third floor is for judoka and visitors who are living in the dojo. The fourth floor contains dressing rooms. The fifth, sixth, and seventh floors are all used for training space (the seventh floor is called the Main Dojo), and the eighth floor is for spectators and has seats that look down into the main space of the seventh floor.

== Research floor ==
The Kano Memorial Hall, Historical hall, exhibition room, and material stock room are located on the second floor. The halls contain posters of the development of judo, as well as information on some of the great masters of the system, written documents, photographs, and other information on the life of Kano and the people he met through his travels. The extensive library on the second floor holds over 7,000 books pertaining to judo, and is planned to be increased eventually.

There are four research laboratories on the second floor:

- 1st Lab: Theoretical and historical study of judo.
- 2nd Lab: Psychological study of judo.
- 3rd Lab: Technical analysis of judo. Research on the physical strength of judo players.
- 4th Lab: Physiological study of judo.

The research staff use fundamental and applied science to work with foreign researchers. Research is displayed to the public and free of charge to view once during the year.

== Visiting the Kodokan ==
Short-term visitors to Tokyo can visit the Kodokan to watch or attend practice. Visitors may walk up to the main floor of the dojo to watch practice or competitions. Permission is required to attend the practice for transient students. One-time visitors are most likely to be allowed to take part in a randori session with foreign students.

== Main floor ==
The Main Dojo is found on the seventh floor. The dojo is carefully designed to give the precise amount of floor spring, brightness, and ventilation. Four official contests can be held at the same time in the Main Dojo on the seventh floor. It has 420 mats and approximately 900 spectators can be seated on the eighth floor. Medical equipment is provided in case of emergencies.

== Attire ==
Only white judogi (judo uniforms) are generally allowed in the Kodokan (except for special occasions and foreign guests for whom they may show some tolerance). Wearing blue or any other color judogi is considered disrespectful, as the white judogi is traditional and has cultural significance. Undershirts for men are not allowed.

== See also ==
- Kōdōkan Shitennō
- Jujutsu
- List of Kodokan Judo techniques
- Hombu dojo
