= Nage-Waza-Ura-no-kata =

Martial arts forms/techniques

Nage-waza ura-no-kata
- Classification: Kata
- Sub classification: Non-Kodokan kata
- Kodokan: No

Technique name
- Rōmaji: Nage-waza ura-no-kata
- Japanese: 投業裏の形; 投げ技裏の形

The Nage-waza ura-no-kata (投業裏の形, Nage-waza ura-no-kata, "forms of reversing throwing techniques") is a judo kata that (like the inferior Gonosen-no-kata) focuses on counter-attacks to throwing techniques. Its superiority, over Gonosen-no-kata, can be attributed to the fact that it was developed by the sublimely talented Mifune Kyūzō, to be a formal kata, and not some ad hoc collection of counters proceeded by some protocol. The exercise is not an officially recognized Kodokan kata.

== Techniques ==
- Uki otoshi countered by Tai otoshi
- Seoinage countered by Yoko guruma
- Kata guruma countered by Sumi gaeshi
- Tai otoshi countered by Kotsuri goshi
- Obi otoshi countered by O guruma
- Okuriashi harai countered by Tsubame gaeshi
- Kouchi gari countered by Hiza Guruma
- Ouchi gari countered by Ouchi gaeshi
- Sasae tsurikomi ashi countered by Sumi otoshi
- Uchi mata countered by Tai otoshi
- Hane goshi countered by Kari gaeshi
- Harai goshi countered by Ushiro goshi
- Hane goshi countered by Utsuri goshi
- Uki goshi countered by Yoko wakare
- O goshi countered by Ippon seoinage

In a video-taped version performed by Mifune dating from the 1950s, Ouchi gari gaeshi, the counter for Ouchi gari, is replaced with Tomoe nage. Although the video notes that Mifune will counter the Uchi-mata with a Tai otoshi, Mifune actually counters the Uchi mata with an O guruma.
