= Kaeshi-no-kata =

Judo form/technique

Kaeshi-(no)-kata
- Classification: Kata
- Sub classification: Non-Kodokan kata
- Kodokan: No

Technique name
- Rōmaji: Kaeshi-kata
- Japanese: 返の形; 返へし方
- English: Forms of return Forms of reversal

Practice of Kaeshi no Kata (返の形; Forms of reversal) is almost entirely limited to Great-Britain, where until today it has been understood as a judo kata which, like the Gonosen-no-kata, focuses on counter-attacks to throwing techniques. The kata was commonly explained as being an older form than Gonosen-no-kata, that was passed on to Ōtani Masutarō from Tani Yukio.

It was recently shown, however, that the "kaeshi-no-kata" has no authentic basis as a kata, and is largely the result of a linguistic mix-up. "Kaeshi-kata", properly written 返へし方 rather than 返の形, and without the possessive particle の (no) was the title of a series of articles written in the 1920s by Takahashi-sensei from Waseda University in Tokyo. Nearly a dozen articles presented his pioneering work on the principles of counter-attacks to throwing techniques. These were loose techniques that were never intended for, or made into a kata form. However, without access to these sources or a thorough understanding of the author's intent, confusing the two homonymic and differently meaning kanji (方 versus 形, both pronounced "kata"), is not unlikely, and explains the absence of any existing primary sources evidencing the historic creation of a formal exercise with the name "kaeshi-kata" or "kaeshi-no-kata".

As judo in the early days was often popularized outside Japan by means of public demonstrations given by judo experts, many exercises were presented in demonstration form, several for which names were invented in Europe by residing Japanese, who often had some martial arts, but relatively little judo experience. Now that "kaeshi-(no)-kata" in reality has no basis as an existing kata, it is evident that it also is not and never has been an officially recognized Kodokan kata. However, in Britain, this "kata" exists in two forms with minor variations in order and techniques, but its practice is almost entirely limited to public demonstrations or judo rank promotion tests.

== Techniques ==
- Deashi harai countered by Tsubame gaeshi (i.e. Deashi harai countered by Deashi harai)
- Kouchi gari countered by Hiza Guruma
- Ouchi gari countered by Kosoto gari
- Osoto gari countered by Osoto guruma
- Kosoto gari countered by Tai otoshi
- Harai goshi countered by Ushiro goshi
- Hane goshi countered by Harai tsurikomi ashi
- Uchi mata countered by Uchi mata sukashi
- Koshi guruma countered by Utsuri goshi
- Ippon seoinage countered by Uki waza

Alternatively:

- Deashi harai countered by Deashi harai
- Ouchi gari countered by Ushiro goshi
- Kouchi gari countered by Okuriashi harai
- Osoto gari countered by Harai goshi
- Kosoto gari countered by Tai otoshi
- Hane goshi countered by Deashi harai
- Harai goshi countered by Ushiro goshi
- Uchi mata countered by Te waza
- Koshi guruma countered by Utsuri goshi
- Ippon seoinage countered by Uki waza
