= List of Danzan-ryū techniques =

The Danzan Ryu lists differ in concept from the Kodokan Judo lists in that the techniques are taught in kata form in some applicable context, rather than simply demonstrating and enumerating a single technique. Deashi Hayanada, for example, is not a single technique, but a combination of Deashi Harai (foot sweep) and Tenada Shime (cross arm bar). Emphasis on randori may vary greatly from one dojo to the next.

There are multiple romanizations, and many arts have more than one name. This article will attempt to represent the commonly used romanization variants. In addition, not all sources agree on the correct kanji (Japanese characters) for each technique or list. The alternative renderings are noted. The romanization was not agreed to until 1957. The earlier spellings are now archaic. Some kanji are also no longer common and not searchable (e.g. Danchu or Bitei).

The rank requirements for Danzan Ryu are not standardized, and may vary from dojo to dojo or even from instructor to instructor. However, the curriculum is divided into three levels: Shoden (初傳; beginning transmission), Chuden (中傳; intermediate transmission), and Okuden (奥傳; hidden or inner teachings). Many of the techniques are considered Kuden – to be transmitted orally and never written down.

Each of the Okuden scrolls corresponds to a level of teaching license:

- Shinen-no-Maki was commemorated by the award of the Mokuroku, or catalogue scroll, listing the history of the art along with the Shoden and Chuden techniques. This is the basic instructor level and is equivalent to second-degree blackbelt.
- Shin'yō-no-Maki corresponds to the fully licensed instructor (Kyoshi) level and is equivalent to fourth – or fifth-degree blackbelt.
- Shingen-no-Maki (post Pearl Harbor attack) was commemorated by the award of the Kaiden-no-Sho, or certificate of complete transmission (menkyo kaiden). This corresponds to the master instructor (Shihan / Professor) level of traditional jujutsu.

== Yawara – Shoden level ==
Hand Techniques/Gentle Arts, 20 Techniques

1. Katate Hazushi Ichi – "Single Hand Escape #1" – escape from an outside hand grab
2. Katate Hazushi Ni – "Single Hand Escape #2" – escape from an inside hand grab
3. Ryōte Hazushi – "Both Hands Escape" – escape from a double wrist grab
4. Morote Hazushi – "All Hands Escape or Multiple Hands Escape" – escape from two hands grabbing one wrist.
5. Yubi Tori Hazushi – "Digit (finger) Escape" – escape from a finger hold/grab
6. Momiji Hazushi " Maple leaf Escape" – escape from a front choke
7. Ryo Eri Hazushi – "Both Lapel Escape" – escape from a double lapel grab
8. Yubi Tori – "Digit (finger) Technique" – finger lock on the sensitive third finger
9. Moroyubi Tori – "All Digit (finger) Technique" – come-along all fingers hold
10. Katate Tori – "Single Hand Technique" – one hand wrist lock
11. Ryōte Tori – "Both Hand Technique" – double wrist lock
12. Tekubi Tori Ichi – "Hand Neck (wrist) Technique One" – wrist lock from an outside hand grab
13. Tekubi Tori Ni – "Hand Neck (wrist) Technique Two" – thumb lock from an inside hand grab.
14. Imon Tori – "Clothing Seizure" – break hand from a chest push (衣紋捕)
15. Ryōeri Tori – "Both Lapel Technique" – break and wrist lock from a two-handed lapel grab
16. Akushu Kote Tori – "Handshake Forearm (curling) technique" – wrist and thumb lock from a handshake
17. Akushu Ude Tori – "Handshake Arm technique" – arm bar from a handshake
18. Akushu Kotemaki Tori – "Handshake Forearm (curling) Rolling Technique" – arm bar and wrist lock from a handshake
19. Kubi Nuki Shime – "Neck Hug Constriction" – escape from a side headlock
20. Hagai Shime – "Wing Constriction" – full nelson taken after avoiding a blow

== Nage Te –Shoden level ==
also called Nage no Kata: Throwing Arts, 20 Techniques

1. Deashi Harai – Advanced foot sweep
2. Sasae-ashi – Stopping leg
3. Okuri Harai – Sending sweep
4. Soto Gama – Outside sickle
5. Uchi Gama – Inside sickle
6. Soto Momo Harai – Outer thigh sweep
7. Uchi Momo Harai – Inner thigh sweep
8. Ogoshi – Major hip
9. Utsuri Goshi – Changing hip throw
10. Seoi Nage – Back carry throw
11. Ushiro Goshi – Rearward hip
12. Seoi Goshi – Back carry hip
13. Tsurikomi Goshi – Lifting angle hip
14. Harai Goshi – Sweeping hip
15. Hane Goshi – Springing hip
16. Uki Otoshi – Floating drop
17. Makikomi – Rolling angle
18. Kane Sute – Crab sacrifice
19. Tomoe Nage – Comma throw
20. Yama Arashi – Mountain Storm

== Shime Te –Shoden level ==
also called Shime no Kata: Constriction Arts, 25 Techniques

1. Eri Gatame – Collar Pin
2. Kata Gatame – Shoulder Pin
3. Juji Gatame – Cross Pin
4. Shiho Gatame – Four corners Pin
5. Sankaku Gatame – Three angle (triangle) Pin
6. Ushiro Gatame – Rearward Pin
7. Namijuji Shime – Normal Cross Constriction
8. Gyakujuji Shime – Opposite Cross Constriction
9. Ichimonji Shime – Single line Constriction
10. Tsukkomi Shime – Thrusting angle Constriction
11. Hadaka Hime Ichi – Naked Constriction #1
12. Hadaka Shime Ni – Naked Constriction #2
13. Hadaka Shime San – Naked Constriction #3
14. Dakikubi Shime – Embrace Neck Constriction
15. Osaegami Shime – Grabbing Hair Constriction
16. Kote Shime – Forearm (curling) Constriction
17. Tenada Shime – Hand blade Constriction
18. Do Shime – Body Constriction {which causes Compressive asphyxia}
19. Ashi Garami Shime – Leg Entangle Constriction
20. Ashi Nada Shime – Leg Blade Constriction
21. Ashi Yubi Shime – Leg Digit (toe) Constriction
22. Momojime – Thigh Constriction
23. Shika no Issoku Shime – Foot of Deer Constriction
24. Shidare Fuji Shime – Big toe Hanging wisteria Constriction
25. Tatsumaki Shime – Wind roll (Tornado) Constriction

== Yonenbu no Kata – Shoden level ==
Form for the Children's Section, 15 Techniques

1. Deashi Harai or Deashibarai – advance foot sweep
2. Sasae-ashi – retard (stopping) leg
3. Okuriharai or Okuribarai – Sending sweep
4. Soto Gama – Outside sickle
5. Uchi Gama – Inside sickle
6. Soto Momo Harai or Sotomomobarai – Outer thigh sweep
7. Uchi Momo Harai or Uchimomobarai – Inner thigh sweep
8. O Goshi – Major hip throw
9. Seoinage – Back carry throw
10. Seoi Goshi – Back carry hip throw
11. Tsuri Komi Goshi – Lifting angle hip throw
12. Harai Goshi – Sweeping hip throw
13. Hane Goshi – Springing hip throw
14. Makikomi – rolling angle
15. Tomoe Nage – Swirl throw

== Oku no Te – Chuden level ==
also called Oku no Kata: Interior (secret) techniques, 25 Techniques

1. Deashi Hayanada – Advancing Leg Quick combination blade
2. Ogoshi Hayanada – Major Loin Quick combination blade
3. Seoi Hayanada – Back-carry Quick combination blade
4. Sumi Gaeshi – Corner Accepting reversal
5. Norimi – Riding the body
6. Mizu Kuguri – Underwater dive
7. Mae Yama Kage – Forward Mountain Shadow
8. Komi Iri – Swept along entry
9. Kote Gaeshi – Forearm (curling) accepting reversal
10. Sakanuki – Sloping draw
11. Gyakute Nage – Opposite hand throw
12. Hon Tomoe – Together comma
13. Katate Tomoe – Single hand comma
14. Shigarami or Teshigarami – Arm entanglement
15. Gyakute Shigarami – Opposite hand arm entanglement
16. Kote Shigarami – Forearm arm entanglement
17. Ko Guruma – Minor wheel
18. Tora Nage – Tiger throw
19. Tora Katsugi – Tiger Shoulder carry
20. Arashi Otoshi – Storm drop
21. Hiki Otoshi – Pulling drop
22. Kine Katsugi – Pestle shoulder carry
23. Kin Katsugi – Testicle shoulder carry
24. Kazaguruma – Wind Wheel
25. Jigoku Otoshi – Hell drop

== Kiai no Maki – Chuden level ==
Scroll of Spirit Yell, 24 Techniques –-( AJJF Board of Professors includes a number of additional techniques under this heading. See below)– Includes weapons techniques, and a variety of oral teachings (kuden)

1. Waribashi Ori – Split chopstick fold
2. Karatake Wari – Chinese bamboo split
3. Harage Ishi Wari – Abdomen lifting stone split
4. Shiraha Watari – Naked blade transit

Tessen No Maki

1. Katate Hazushi – single hand escape
2. Mune Dori – Chest Dynamic technique
3. Miken Wari – Forehead split
4. Uchikomi Dome – Stop a strike
5. Katate Ori – Single-hand fold
6. Katsura Wari – Judas tree split

Tanto No Maki

1. Hibara Hazushi – Flank escape
2. Katate Hazushi – Single-hand escape
3. Tsukkomi Hazushi – Thrust escape
4. Ryote Dome – Stop with both hands

Daito No Maki

1. Ryote Dome- Both Hand Immediate Stop
2. Nukimi Dome – Stop a draw
3. Shiraha Dori – Naked blade hold
4. Suso Harai or Susobarai – Hem sweep

Bo No Maki

1. Hanbo Uchikomi Dori – Hold from strike with a 3 ft staff
2. Rokushaku Bo Furi – Six-foot staff swing
3. Mune Gatame – Chest pin
4. Shiho Gatame – Four direction pin
5. Futari Shime or Ninin Shime or Nininjime – two-man constriction
6. Furo Shime or Furojime – Bathtub strangle
7. Shichinin Shime or Shichininjime – seven-man constriction

Tanju No Maki

1. Gan Hazushi or Me Hazushi – Face or Eye escape
2. Mune Hazushi – Chest Escape
3. Hibara Hazushi – Flank escape

The following were added to Tanju no Maki by AJJF:

1. Ushiro Hazushi Ichi – Rear Escape #1
2. Ushiro Hazushi Ni – Rear Escape #2
3. Mawari Hazushi – Turning Escape

Further additions to Kiai No Maki by AJJF in 1976 included the following additional techniques:

Keri Te

1. Tombogeri – Dragonfly kick
2. Kin Geri – Testicle Kick – (In the AJJF Kin Geri is the terminology used, even though the three kicks in the curriculum target the knee, groin, and solar plexus with a front kick)
3. Yoko Geri – Side kick
4. Mawashi Geri – Roundhouse Kick
5. Ryo-ashi Geri – Double foot kick
6. Mae Tobi Geri – Front flying kick

Uke Te

1. Jodan Uke – Upper-level Block
2. Nagashi Uke – Flowing Block
3. Shuto Uke – Knife Hand Block
4. Gedan Uke – Lower-level Block

Atemi

1. Atemi Ichi – Strike One (Side of jaw)
2. Atemi Ni – Strike Two (Upward palm strike to chin)
3. Atemi San – Strike Three (Upward palm strike to nose)
4. Atemi Yon – Strike Four (Side of head above ear)
5. Kasumi Dori – Seized by Haze (grazing knife-hand/forearm strike to side of neck)
6. Hibara Uchi – Flank Strike (elbow to floating ribs/liver)
7. Sui Getsu – Moon in the Water (Uppercut to solar plexus)
8. Hon Getsu – True Moon (downward punch to bladder)
9. Kin Geri – Testicle Kick (knee to groin)

Hanbo no Maki

1. Ganseki Otoshi Garami – Stone-drop Entanglement
2. Oni Kudaki – Demon Smash
3. Ashi Kujiki – Leg Crush
4. Ashi Gatame – Leg Pin
5. Bo Gaeshi _ Staff Reversal
6. Koku – Empty

== Goshinjutsu – Chuden level ==
Self-Defense Techniques: 28 techniques added by the AJJF Board of Professors, and modified periodically by them. Other DZR groups may not recognize this as a separate list, but instead may practice these techniques as common variations of techniques found in other lists. Formerly called Jokyu Yawara, Advanced Yawara, or Ladies' Yawara. Based on the original Fujin Goshin no Maki.

1. Kata Eri Hazushi – Single collar escape
2. Katate Tori Ni – Single hand Technique #2
3. Katate Tori San – Single hand Technique #3
4. Katate Tori Shi – Single hand Technique #4
5. Imon Tori Ni – Insignia Technique #2
6. Kata Mune Tori – Single chest Technique
7. Ude Tori – Arm Technique
8. Genkotsu Ude Tori – Gripping with the fist arm technique
9. Ude Gyaku Ichi – Arm opposite #1
10. Ude Gyaku Ni – Arm opposite #2
11. Ninen Yubi Tori – Second Man Digit (finger) Technique (formerly called Ninin Kotegarami)
12. Kata Eri Tori – Single Collar Technique
13. Ushiro Gyaku – Rearward Opposite
14. Kata Hagai – Single wing
15. Tekubi Shigarami – Wrist Shoulder entanglement
16. Genkotsu Otoshi – Gripping with the fist drop
17. Hongyaku Ichi – Basic Opposite #1
18. Hongyaku Ni – Basic Opposite #2
19. Ushiro Daki Nage – Rear Embrace throw
20. Mae Daki Nage Ichi – Front Embrace throw #1
21. Mae Daki Nage Ni – Front Embrace throw #2
22. Kata Guruma – Shoulder wheel
23. Hiza Garami – Knee entanglement (formerly called Hiki-otoshi Ichi)
24. Mae Osaegami Nage – Forward Gripping Hair Throw
25. Ushiro Osaegami Nage – Rear Gripping Hair Throw
26. Kesa Nage – Across the Shoulder (as a scarf) Throw
27. Ashi Garami-Leg Entanglement
28. Sannen Nage – Third Man throw (called Sannin Hazushi by Prof. Law and listed in his Shinin Notes; previously included by AJJF in Shinin no Maki with same name as noted below)

== Fujin Goshin no Maki – Chuden level ==
Women's Self Defense Scroll, 35 Techniques

1. Katate Hazushi Ichi – Single hand Escape #1.
2. Katate Hazushi Ni – Single hand Escape #2.
3. Morote Hazushi – Many hand Escape.
4. Ryote Hazushi – Double hand Escape.
5. Kata Eri Hazushi – Single Collar Escape.
6. Ryo Eri Hazushi – Double Collar Escape.
7. Momiji Hazushi Ichi – Maple tree Escape #1.
8. Momiji Hazushi Ni – Maple tree Escape #2.
9. Momiji Hazushi San – Maple tree Escape #3.
10. Ushiro Daki Nage – Rear Embrace Throw.
11. Mae Daki Nage Ichi – Front Embrace Throw #1.
12. Mae Daki Nage Ni – Front Embrace Throw #2.
13. Mae Daki Hazushi – Front Embrace Escape.
14. Ninin Hazushi – Second Man Escape.
15. Genkotsu Otoshi – Gripping with the Fist Drop.
16. Osaegami Nage – Grabbing Hair Throw.
17. Akushu Kote Tori – Handshake Forearm (curling) Technique.
18. Akushu Ude Tori – Handshake Arm-lock.
19. Akushu Kotemaki Tori – Handshake Forearm-winding Technique.
20. Katate Tori Ichi – Single hand Technique #1.
21. Katate Tori Ni – Single hand Technique #2.
22. Imon tori – Insignia Technique.
23. Daki kubi Tori – Embrace head Technique.
24. Yubi Tori Hazushi – Digit (finger) Technique Escape.
25. Yubi Tori – Digit (finger) Technique.
26. Moro Yubi Tori – Many Digit (finger) Technique.
27. Ryote Tori – Both Hand Technique.
28. Tekubi Tori – Wrist Technique.
29. Hagai Tori – Wing Technique.
30. Shoto Hibara Hazushi – Knife Spleen Escape.
31. Shoto Kata Hazushi – Knife Shoulder Escape.
32. Shoto Tsukkomi Hazushi – Knife Thrusting Angle Escape.
33. Tanju Mune Hazushi – Pistol Chest Escape.
34. Tanju Gan Hazushi – Pistol Eye Escape.
35. Tanju Hibara Hazushi – Pistol Spleen Escape.

== Fusegi Jutsu – Chuden level ==
Self Defense Techniques

1. Katate Hazushi Ichi - "Single Hand Escape one"- Escape and hold from outside wrist grip
2. Kata Te Hazushi Ni - "Single Hand Escape two"- Escape and hold from an inside wrist grip
3. Momiji Hazushi - "Maple leaf Escape" - Double arm break from front strangle
4. Moro Te Hazushi - "Many Hand Escape" - Double arm break from front strangle
5. Imon Tori - "Insignia Techniques"- Knee takedown from chest push
6. Akushu Ude Hazushi and Tori - "Handshake Arm Escape and Technique"- Escape and leg kick from armbar
7. Akushu Kote Hazushi and Tori Ichi - "Handshake Forearm Curling Escape and Technique one" - Backward thumb flex from handshake
8. Akushu Kote Hazushi and Tori Ni - "Handshake Forearm Curling Escape and Technique two" - Forward thumb flex from handshake
9. Akushu Kote Hazushi and Tori San - "Handshake Forearm Curling Escape and Technique three" - Thumb control from handshake
10. Hagai Shime Hazushi - "Pinion Constriction Escape" - Escape from full nelson
11. Ushiro Daki Nage - "Rearward Hug Throw" - Seoi Nage, strike from rear bear hug
12. Mae Daki Nage Ichi - "Forward Hug Throw one" - Nerve escape from front bear hug, arms free
13. Mae Daki Nage Ni - "Forward Hug Throw two" - Head butt, knee strike from front bear hug, arms pinned
14. Genkotsu Otoshi - "Gripping with the Fist Drop" - Dakikubi from a double punch
15. Kata Gatame Ichi - "Shoulder Pin one" - Shoulder lock taking head to mat from punch
16. Kata Gatame Ni - "Shoulder Pin two" - Kotemaki Tori from an overhead club, finish with O Soto Gari
17. Kabe Shime - "Wall Constriction" - Ichi Monji against a wall
18. Genkotsu Ude Tori - "Gripping with the Fist Arm Technique" - Wrap arm, strike, sweep and bar on ground from punch
19. Genkotsu Gyaku - "Gripping with the Fist Opposite" - Wrap arm, hammerlock and choke
20. Ude Tori - "Arm Technique" - Arm bar on your shoulder from punch
21. Akushu Ude Nage - "Handshake Arm Throw" - Arm break, whip from handshake
22. Ogoshi Ude Tori - "Great Hip Arm Technique" - Throw O Goshi, sit and break arm
23. Ude Hazushi Ogoshi - "Arm Escape Great Hip" - Throw O Goshi from armbar across waist
24. Genkotsu Komi Iri - "Gripping with the Fist Swept Along Entry" - Legbar takedown, apply Komi Iri
25. Hadaka Shime Ni and Hazushi - "Naked Constriciton two and Escape" - Choke from Seoi Nage, drop on head
26. Club take away - Throw Makikomi, break arm from overhead club strike

== Keisatsu Gijutsu – Chuden level ==
also called Keisatsu Torite: Police Arrest Techniques

1. Katate Hazushi Ichi – "Single Hand Escape #1" – escape from an outside hand grab
2. Katate Hazushi Ni – "Single Hand Escape #2" – escape from an inside hand grab
3. Ryōte Hazushi – "Both Hands Escape" – escape from a double wrist grab
4. Morote Hazushi – "Many Hands Escape or Multiple Hands Escape" – escape from two hands grabbing one wrist
5. Momiji Hazushi " Maple leaf Escape" – escape from a front choke
6. Ryōeri Hazushi – "Both Lapel Escape" – escape from a double lapel grab
7. Yubi Tori Hazushi – "Digit (finger) Escape" – escape from a finger hold/grab
8. Yubi Tori – "Digit (finger) Technique" – finger lock on the sensitive third finger
9. Moro Yubi Tori – "Many Digit (finger) Technique" – come-along all fingers hold
10. Katate Tori – "Single Hand Technique" – one hand wrist lock
11. Ryōte Tori – "Both Hand Technique" – double wrist lock
12. Akushu Kote Tori – "Handshake Forearm (curling) technique" – wrist and thumb lock from a handshake
13. Akushu Ude Tori – "Handshake Arm technique" – arm bar from a handshake
14. Akushu Kotemaki Tori – "Handshake Forearm (curling) Rolling Technique" – arm bar and wrist lock from a handshake
15. Imon Tori – "Insignia Technique" – break hand from a chest push
16. Tekubi Tori Ichi – "Hand Neck (wrist) Technique One" – wrist lock from an outside hand grab
17. Tekubi Tori Ni – "Hand Neck (wrist) Technique Two" – thumb lock from an inside hand grab
18. Ryōeri Tori – "Both Lapel Technique" – break and wrist lock from a two-handed lapel grab
19. Kubi Nuki Shime – "Neck Hug Constriction" – escape from a side headlock
20. Hagai Shime – "Wing Constriction" – full nelson taken after avoiding a blow
21. Kata Mune Tori - "Shoulder Chest Technique"- Lapel grab and punch defense
22. Genkotsu Ude Tori - "Gripping with the Fist Arm Technique"- Armbar from a punch
23. Ude Gyaku San - "Arm Opposite Three"- Shoulder and neck hold from front
24. Ude Gyaku Shi - "Arm Opposite Four"- Shoulder and neck hold from rear
25. Ninnen Kote Garami - "Second man Forearm (curling) Entanglement"- Two man come-along hold
26. Sannen Kote Garami - "Third man Forearm (curling) Entanglement"- Three man come-along hold
27. Kataeri Tori - "Single Collar Technique"- Armbar from lapel hold
28. Ushiro Gyaku - "Rearward Opposite"- Extended rear armbar
29. Mae Gyaku- "Front Opposite"- Extended front armbar
30. Kote Shigarami - "Forearm (curling) Arm Entanglement"- Punch to Kotemaki pin with one hand
31. Kote Gyaku - "Forearm (curling) Opposite"- Reverse arm dislocation
32. Kata Hagai - "Shoulder Wing"- Standing Kata Gatame
33. Tekubi Shigarami - "Hand-neck (wrist) Arm Entanglement Two- Wrist come-along hold
34. Genkotsu Otoshi - "Gripping with the fist Drop"- Punch takedown art, fist drop
35. Hung Gyaku - Arm-swing from a punch
36. Ushiro Daki Nage Ni - "Rearward Embrace Throw Two"- Throw from a rear bear hug
37. Ushiro Daki Nage San - "Rearward Embrace Throw Three"- Throw from a rear bear hug
38. Mae Daki Nage Ni - "Forward Embrace Throw Two"- Throw from a front bear hug
39. Kata Guruma - "Shoulder Wheel"- Punch to figure four and pile driver
40. Hiki Otoshi - "Pulling Drop"- Throw and lock arm in leg
41. Gyaku Shigarami - "Opposite Arm Entanglement"- Throw and hold with one foot
42. Ushiro Nage - "Rearward Throw"- A rear throw
43. Osaegami Nage - "Grabbing Hair Throw"- Takedown (Imon Tori) from hair grab
44. Kasumi Dori - "Three in a row Dynamic technique"- Block punch and hit side of neck
45. Atemi Ichi - "Strike the body One"- Block punch and hit side of jaw
46. Atemi Ni - "Strike the body Two" -Block punch and hit side of chin
47. Atemi San - "Strike the body Three"- Block punch and hit side of nose
48. Atemi Shi - "Strike the body Four"- Block punch and hit side of head
49. Ken Keri - "Sword Kick"- Block punch and knee to groin
50. Hibara Uchi - "Spleen Inside"- Block punch and hit armpit
51. Sui Getsu - "Water Moon"- Solar plexus blow
52. Denko - "Electrical flash"- Combination of blows
53. Hon Getsu - "Together Moon"- Naval Blow
54. Momo Shime- "Thigh Constriction"- Nerve at thigh
55. Yubi Tori Shime Ichi - "Digit (finger) Technique Constriction One"- Nerve and thumb and index finger
56. Yubi Tori Shime Ni - "Digit (finger) Technique Constriction Two"- Nerve and thumb and index finger base, palm
57. Kesuri Yubi - Nerve between middle and ring finger
58. Kosi Katari - Nerve between ring and little finger
59. Tekubi Ichi - "Hand neck (wrist) One"- Nerve at wrist, anterior of arm
60. Tekubi Ni - "Hand neck (wrist) Two"- Nerve at wrist, posterior
61. Ude Ori - "Arm Weaving"- Nerve above wrist, arm-break
62. Ninode Tori - Nerve above elbow
63. Kata Tori - "Shoulder Technique"- Nerve at shoulder
64. Ude Tori Shime - "Arm Technique Constriction"- Nerve in arm near elbow
65. Keri Age - "Kick Rising"- Nerve at calf
66. Sumi Age - "Corner Rising"- Nerve at shin
67. Do Mike - "Torso Body Scarf"- Nerve at side of neck
68. Mune - "Chest"- Nerve at front of neck
69. Kubi - "Neck"- Nerve at chin
70. Ni - "Two"- Nerve at eyelids
71. Kata - "Shoulder"- Nerve at shoulder
72. So - "Thought"- Nerve at shoulder blade
73. Konbou Katate Ori - "Club Single hand Weaving"- Club arm hold
74. Konbou Mune Dori - "Club Chest Dynamic technique"- Collarbone breaking art
75. Konbou Kata Uchi - "Club Shoulder Inside"- Hit nerve at side of neck
76. Konbou Kau Tori - Club hand hold
77. Konbou Sui Getsu Otoshi - "Club Water Moon Drop"- Drop uke with solar plexus blow
78. Konbou Ude Ori - "Club Arm Weaving"- Club arm break
79. Konbou Waki Uchi Dori - "Club Armpit Inside Dynamic technique"- Side paralyzing art
80. Konbou Sui Getsu Kin - "Club Water Moon Groin"- Solar plexus and groin blow
81. Konbou Kasumi Dori - "Club Three in a row Dynamic technique"- Club takedown art
82. Konbou Uchikomi Hiza Nage - Club Inside Angle Knee Throw"- Miss swing for head, Hiza nage, leg lock
83. Tanto Hibara Hazushi - "Knife Spleen Escape"- Side slash escape
84. Tanto Kata Hazushi - "Knife Shoulder Escape"- Overhead stab escape
85. Tanto Tsukkomi Hazushi Ichi - "Knife Thrusting Angle Escape One"- Thrusting stab escape 1
86. Tanto Tsukkomi Hazushi Ni - "Knife Thrusting Angle Escape Two"- Thrusting stab escape 2
87. Tanto Ryote Hazushi - "Knife Both hands Escape"- Upward stab escape
88. Tanju Kata Hazushi - "Pistol Shoulder Escape"- Shoulder level escape
89. Tanju Mi Hazushi - "Pistol Body Escape"- Eye level escape
90. Tanju Hibara Hazushi - "Pistol Spleen Escape"- Side escape
91. Tanju Ushiro Hazushi - "Pistol Rearward Escape"- Rear escape
92. Bin Kata Hazushi - "Bottle Shoulder Escape"- Bottle overhead strike
93. Bin Hibara Hazushi - "Bottle Spleen Escape"- Bottle side swing
94. Bin Tsukkomi Hazushi- Bottle Thrusting Angle Escape"- Bottle straight jab
95. Fuetsu Kata Hazushi Ni - "Axe Shoulder Escape Two"- Axe overhead strike
96. Fuetsu Hibara Hazushi Ni - "Axe Spleen Escape Two"- Axe side swing
97. Fuetsu Sune Harai Hazushi - "Axe Shin Sweep Escape"- Axe leg cut
98. Se Katsu - Restoration from strangle
99. Hon Katsu - Restoration from drowning
100. Hanaji Tome - Stop nose bleed
101. No Katsu - Revive blow to head
102. Kin katsu - Revive from kick to testicles

== Shinen no Maki – Okuden level ==
Scroll of the Spirit Man. The AJJF at one time included an additional (36th) technique (Sannin Hazushi), but no longer does so. It is now included in Goshinjutsu (see above).

1. Isami Tsuki Nage – Forward entering Thrusting Throw
2. Obi Hane Goshi – Belt Springing Hip
3. Tsurikomi Taoshi – Lifting Angle Throwdown
4. Momiji Nage – Maple leaf Throw
5. Gyaku Hayanada – Opposite Quick combination blade
6. Hiza Nage – Knee Throw
7. Osaekomi Gyakute Tori – Gripping angle opposite hand Technique
8. Kobushi Shime – Fist Constriction
9. Kesa Hazushi – Across the shoulders (as a scarf) Escape
10. Kubi Shime Tomoe Gyakute – Neck Constriction Comma Opposite hand
11. Ninin Nage – Second person Throw
12. Gyakute Gaeshi – Reverse hand Accepting technique
13. Hiza Ori Nage – Knee Weaving Throw
14. Gyaku Hagai – Opposite Wing
15. Ushiro Kan Nuki – Rearward Rigid Embrace
16. Mae Kan Nuki – Forward Rigid Embrace
17. Hikitate Tori Shime – Measure (from head to floor in seiza) Technique Constriction
18. Ude Garami – Arm Entanglement
19. Ebi Shime – Shrimp Constriction
20. Ushiro Ebi Shime – Rearward Shrimp Constriction
21. Gyaku Eri – Opposite Collar
22. Ushiro Nage – Rearward Throw
23. Ude Shigarami Shime – Arm Shoulder Entanglement Constriction
24. Ashi Kan Nuki – Leg Rigid Embrace
25. Kesa Koroshi – Across the shoulders (as a scarf) Killing
26. Handou Shime – Quick reaction Constriction
27. Ashi Gyaku – Leg Opposite
28. Kabe Shime – Wall Constriction
29. Ashi Karami Tori – Leg Entanglement Constriction
30. Nidan Gaeshi – Two Level Accepting reversal
31. Satsuma Shime – Pillar (or police) Constriction
32. Tataki Komi – Striking Angle
33. Ushiro Nage Tori – Rearward Throw Technique
34. Saru Shigarami – Monkey Shoulder Entanglement
35. Sandan Gaeshi – Three Level Accepting reversal

== Shinyo no Maki – Okuden level ==
Scroll of the Yang Spirit

1. Gyaku Hizaguruma – Opposite Knee Wheel
2. Tsuki Hazushi Kotemaki – Thrusting Escape Forearm rolling
3. Tsukkomi Dome and Gaeshi – Thrusting Angle Immediate stop and Accepting reversal
4. Sune Shime – Lower leg Constriction
5. Saru Shime – Monkey Constriction
6. Tobi Tsuki Tenada – Flying Thrusting Hand blade
7. Obi Otoshi – Belt Drop
8. Sennin Kage – Sailor Shadow
9. Mune Dori – Chest Dynamic technique
10. Tsurigane Otoshi – Swallow Drop
11. Inazuma – Lightning
12. Denkō – Electrical flash
13. Kasumi Dori – Three in a row Dynamic technique
14. Shishi Otoshi – Lion Drop
15. Tawara Gaeshi – Rice bale Accepting reversal
16. Tonbo Gaeshi – Dragonfly Accepting reversal
17. Keri Komi – Kicking Angle
18. Ryuko – Dragon & Lion
19. Haya nawa – Quick combination Rope
20. Katate Tai Atari – Single hand Body Strike
21. Tsuki mi – Thrusting Body
22. Atemi – Strike the Body
23. Zozu Kurawase – Literally: Elephant to deal a Blow
24. Tora Nirami – Tiger Stare
25. Kiai Dori – Fighting spirit (shouting) Dynamic technique
26. Senryu Tomoe – Stopping technique Comma
27. Yuki Chigai – Going along different paths
28. Munen Muso or Munen Musow – No thought, no conceptions

== Shingen no Maki – Okuden level ==
Scroll of the Original Spirit.

1. Ten To or Tento- turning around/overturn drop/fall/collapse
2. Riyo Mou or Ryomo- use/utilize fierce/ferocious
3. Kasumi- hazy/blurry
4. Cho Tou or Choto- retribution/answer/reply
5. Jin Chiu or Jinchu- center of the person
6. Matsukaze- pine wind
7. Gebi
8. Murasame- passing shower
9. Shichu or Hichu
10. Danchu
11. Kyosen aka Kyoto
12. Suigetsu- moon in the water/ Solar plexus
13. Myo Sho
14. Kiyoin or Kyoin- shadowy armpit
15. Tsukikage- thrusting upper body
16. Inatsuma or Inazuma- lightning flash
17. Hoka (Soto) Shiyaku Zawa
18. Uchi Shiyaku Zawa
19. Yakou or Yako
20. Sen Riyu or Senryu
21. Uchi Kibisu- inside heel
22. Kouri or Kori
23. In Nou or Inno
24. Doku Ko or Dokko- lone bow/arc
25. Kaychiu or Keichu
26. Mikazuki- crescent moon
27. Kyoin aka Waki Kage- armpit shadow
28. Wan Sho
29. Kyo Shin
30. Haya Uchi- quick combination strike
31. Gan Ka
32. Sori or Kusanagi- grass cutter/ to mow the grass
33. Do Ko
34. Katsu Satsu or Kassatsu- cure kill
35. Myo Jo- morning star/Venus
36. Tsurigane or Kinteki- hanging bell or testicles
37. Shitsu or Kansetsu
38. Keikotsu- shin bone
39. Kachikake
40. Chukitsu

== Kappō – Koden level ==
Resuscitation Techniques, 11 Techniques originally taught by Professor Okazaki and later augmented in 1969 by Robert Reish to 35 techniques.

The original 11 techniques include:

1. Hon Katsu (basic restoration)
2. Ura Katsu (reverse restoration)
3. Tanden Katsu (abdomen restoration)
4. Nodo Katsu (mental depression restoration)
5. Dekishi Katsu (drowning restoration)
6. Hanaji Tome (nosebleed stop restoration)
7. Kin Katsu (testicle blow restoration)
8. Se Katsu (main restoration)
9. Ashi Katsu (foot restoration)
10. Kubi Kappō (hanging restoration)
11. No Kappō (head restoration)

Note that the names of the 11 "original" techniques varied between different students of Professor Okazaki. The above names are the most commonly used.

== Seifukujutsu – Betsuden level ==
Restoration Therapy 52 Techniques and Long-Life Massage

Taught as a separate tradition (betsuden) even to non-practitioners of Danzan Ryu.

== Curriculum Order ==
The Yawara list is almost always taught as the first list in a curriculum, given its overall usefulness. The first seven techniques, consisting of escapes from simple grips, were once referred to as Te Hodoki (untying of hands), and were the first things taught to a prospective student. While learning the Te Hodoki, the individual's character was observed and assessed, and the teacher would decide whether or not to accept him as a student. Yawara instruction is usually integrated with instruction in breakfalls (sutemi/ukemi), and (once the student can fall safely) with the first techniques of the Nage Te list. Following this comes the rest of Nage Te, Shime Te, Goshinjutsu (Jokyu Yawara) and Oku-no-Te, by the time a student is roughly brown belt. The Kiai no Maki Techniques are generally taught as the student approaches the black belt level, in addition to some or all of Shinin-no-Maki. Shin'yō-no-Maki and Shingen-no-Maki are not introduced until after the black belt has been attained, in most schools. Seifukujutsu, Kappo, meditation techniques, Randori, massage, first aid, and nerve strikes may also be integrated into the curriculum at varying levels, depending on the instructor.
