= Nage-no-kata =

Martial arts forms/techniques

- Tomoe nage, a rear sacrifice throw included in Nage-no-kata.
- Classification: Judo Kata
- Sub classification: Randori-no-kata
- Kodokan: Yes

Technique name
- Rōmaji: Nage-no-kata
- Japanese: 投の形
- English: Forms of throwing

Nage-no-kata (Japanese: 投の形; "forms of throwing") is one of the two randori-no-kata (乱取りの形; free practice forms) of Kodokan Judo. It is intended as an illustration of the various concepts of nage-waza (投げ技; throwing techniques) that exist in judo, and is used both as a training method and as a demonstration of understanding.

== History ==
The nage-no-kata was developed by Jigoro Kano as a method of illustrating principles of throwing to allow students to more effectively apply them in randori. Initially the kata consisted of ten techniques. These were subsequently appended with the addition of a further five throws, including kata guruma and uki otoshi.

== Description ==
The kata is composed of 3 techniques each from the five classifications of throw in judo:

- Te-waza (手技; hand techniques)
- Koshi-waza (腰技; hip techniques)
- Ashi-waza (足技; foot techniques)
- Ma-sutemi-waza (真捨身技; rear sacrifice techniques)
- Yoko-sutemi-waza (橫捨身技; side sacrifice techniques)

Each of these 15 techniques is performed twice in the specified order, both right and left handed. The kata is generally performed in a strictly formalised manner with clearly defined Reigi sahō (礼儀作法; rules of etiquette).

=== Aisatsu (挨拶; Salutation) ===
Tori (取り; the executor of the techniques in the kata) and Uke (受け, the receiver) approach the mat from opposite sides, with Tori on the left hand of the Joseki (上座; high point of the dojo) and Uke on the right (i.e. as they would be if facing towards the Joseki). They bow as they step on the mat, then turn to face the Joseki and execute a ritsu rei (立礼; standing bow), then turn to face each other and execute a zarei (座礼; kneeling bow). Tori and Uke step in, left foot first, to adopt shizen hontai (自然 本体; basic natural posture).

=== Te-waza (手技; hand techniques) ===
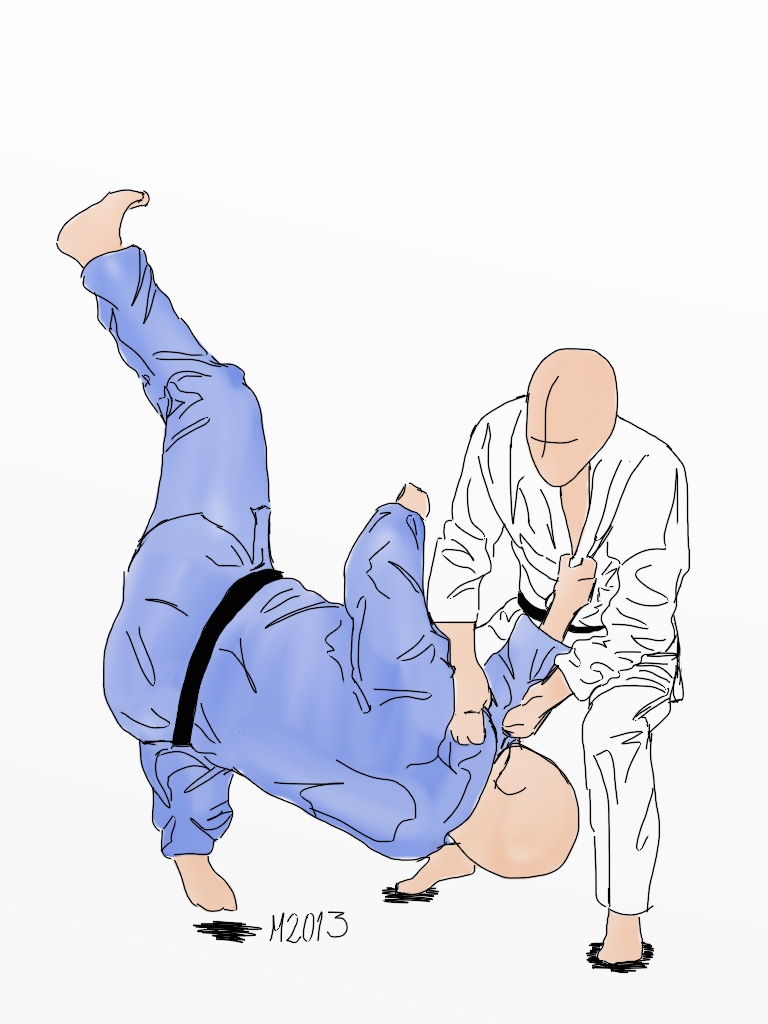
- Uki otoshi (浮落; floating drop)

Tori approaches Uke using ayumi ashi (歩み足; walking gait). Tori and Uke grip using a standard right-handed sleeve-lapel grip. Uke initiates by stepping forward using tsugi ashi (次足; following gait) into migi shizentai (右自然态; right-handed natural stance). Tori responds by stepping backwards (tsugi ashi). Uke's balance is compromised and he attempts to regain the advantage by stepping forward again and Tori again responds by stepping backwards, further unbalancing Uke. On Uke's second attempt to regain his balance (i.e. his third step forward), Tori breaks rhythm, dropping to his left knee, and throws Uke to his rear, pulling with a steering motion.

Tori and Uke return to their feet and repeat the technique in the opposite (i.e. left-handed) orientation.

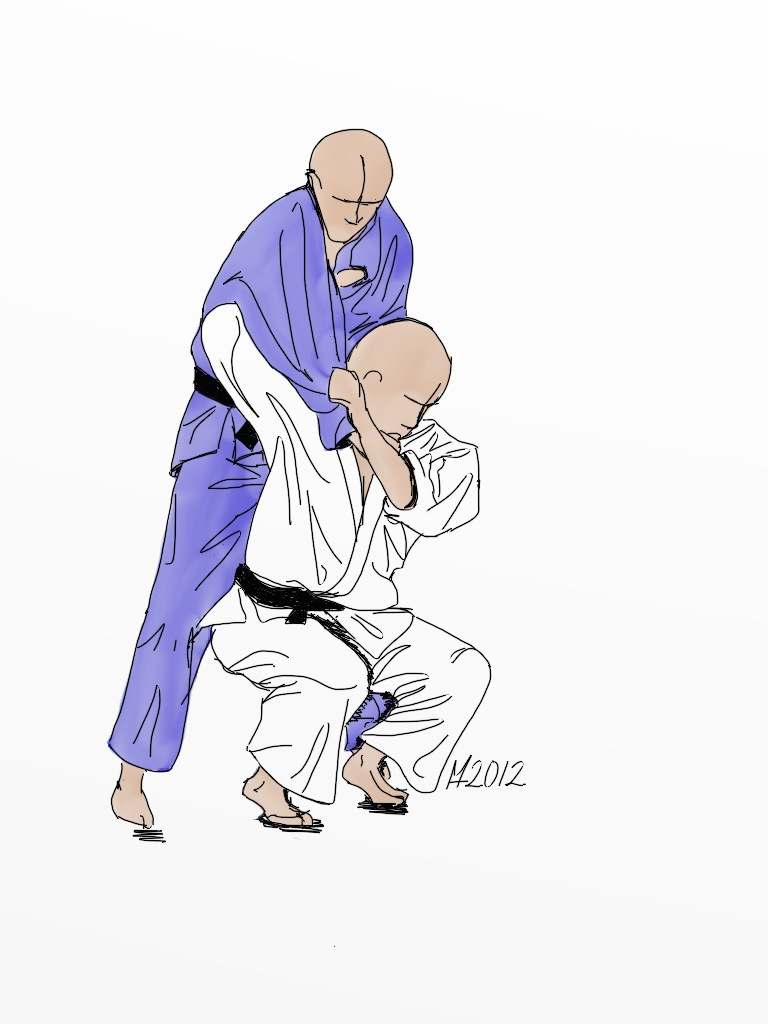
- Seoi nage (背負投) - shoulder throw

Uke approaches tori, steps forward with the right foot and raises the right hand as a hammer fist to strike directly on the top of tori's head. This works better if uke uses some power and momentum to strike. Tori allows the blow to begin to fall. Tori steps around 180 degrees, grabs (pulls) uke's right arm to continue to allow uke's momentum to follow forward. Tori does not deflect the blow to the side, but assists in moving the blow (and uke) forward and downward. The forward momentum of uke's blow makes uke fall onto tori's back (kuzushi). At the same time, tori is ready to receive uke on his back and turns his shoulders and body while maintaining grip of the arm, redirecting the forward energy of the fall (and of uke) to the ground.

Tori and Uke return to their feet and repeat the technique in the opposite left-handed orientation.

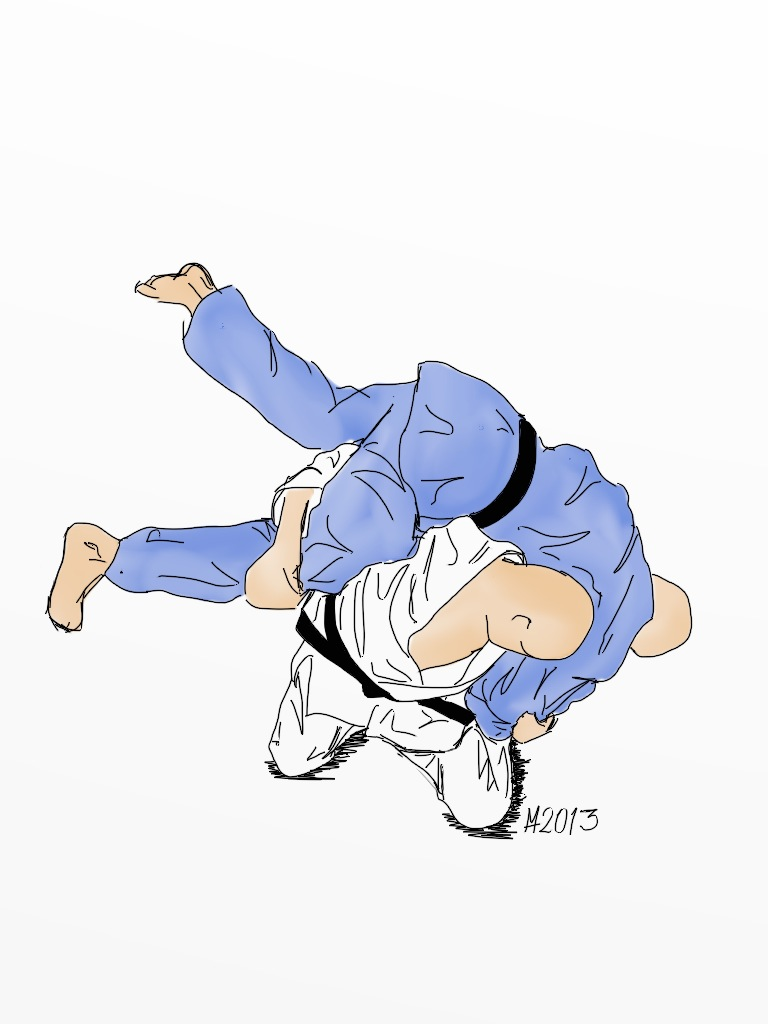
- Kata guruma (肩車) - shoulder wheel

Tori approaches Uke's side, and receives the attack of Uke, which is the standard grip, explained previously, named Kumi kata (組方, fundamental grip) and pushing against uke. Tori follows the force of Uke and makes the first step backwards, as in the previous throws. In the second step, Tori

=== Koshi-waza (hip techniques) ===
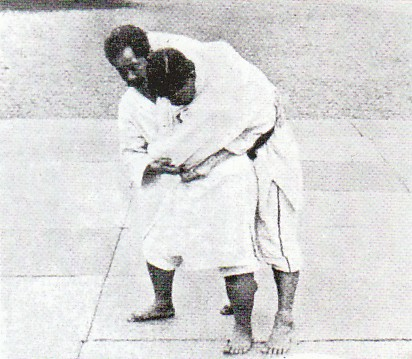
- Uki goshi (浮腰) - floating hip throw
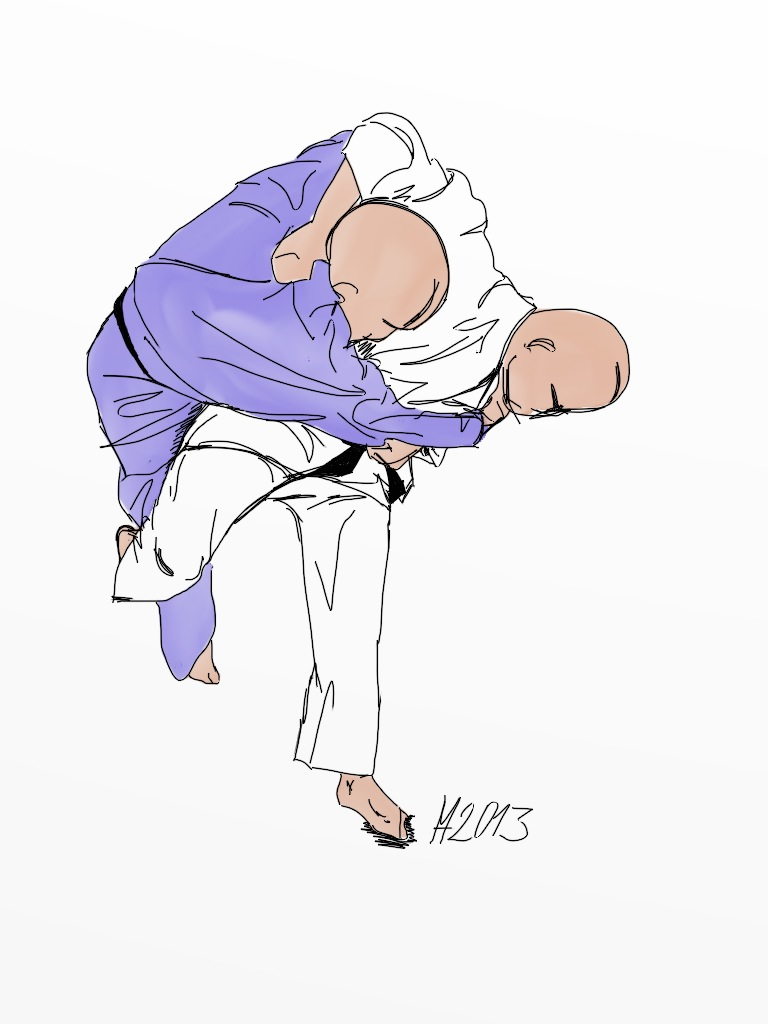
- Harai goshi (払腰) - sweeping hip throw
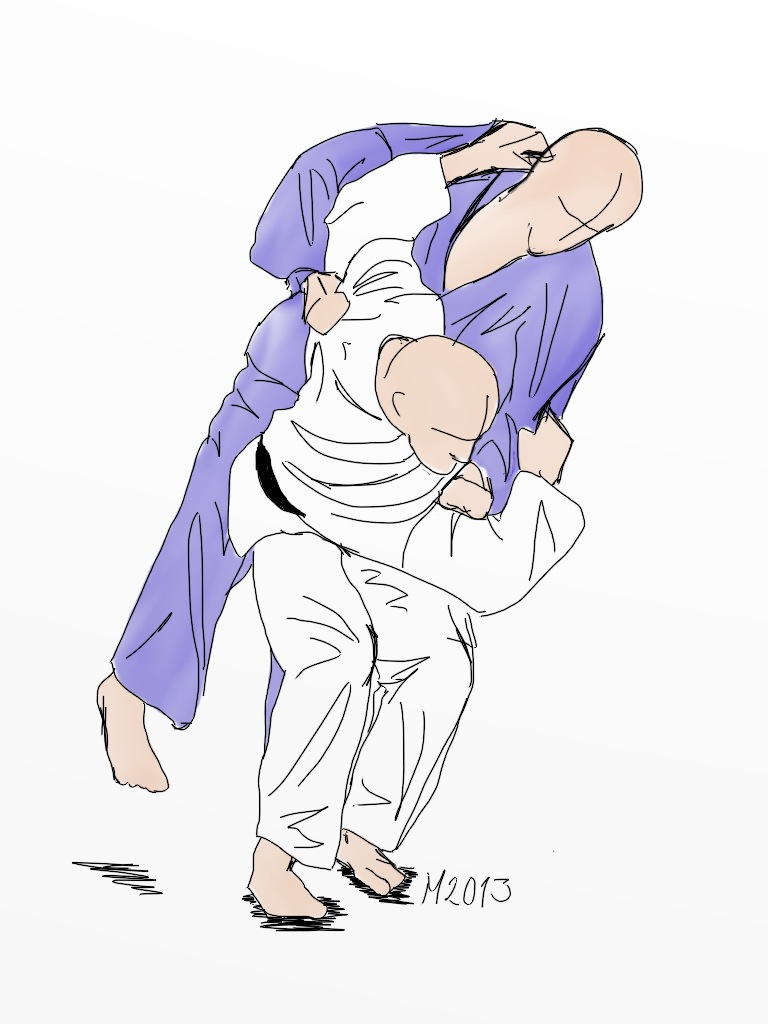
- Tsurikomi goshi (釣込腰) - lifting/pulling hip throw

=== Ashi-waza (foot techniques) ===
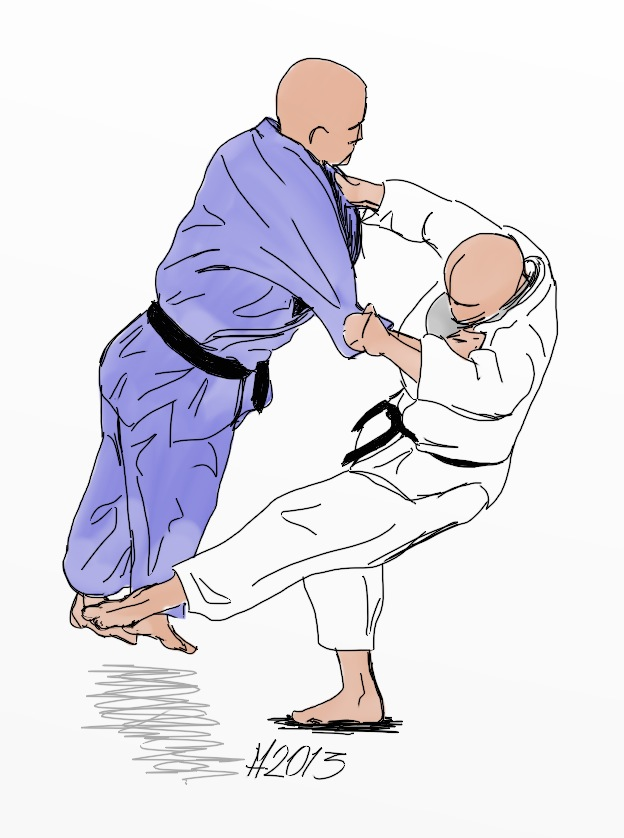
- Okuriashi harai (送足払) - sliding foot sweep
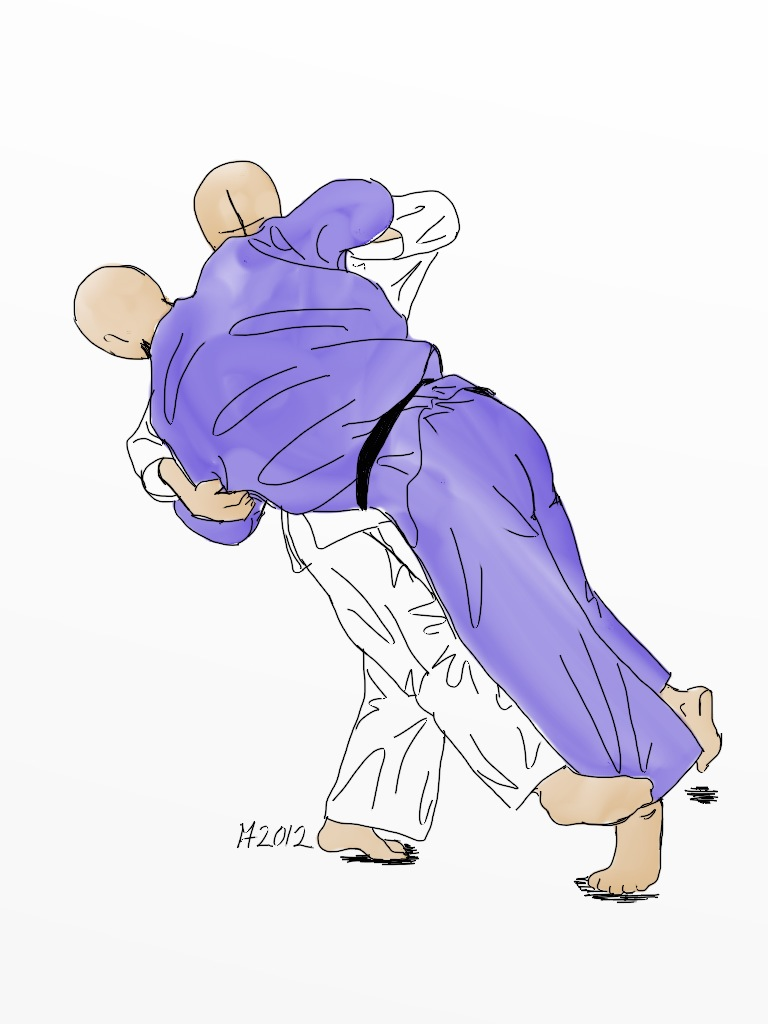
- Sasae tsurikomi ashi (支釣込足) - Propping and drawing ankle throw
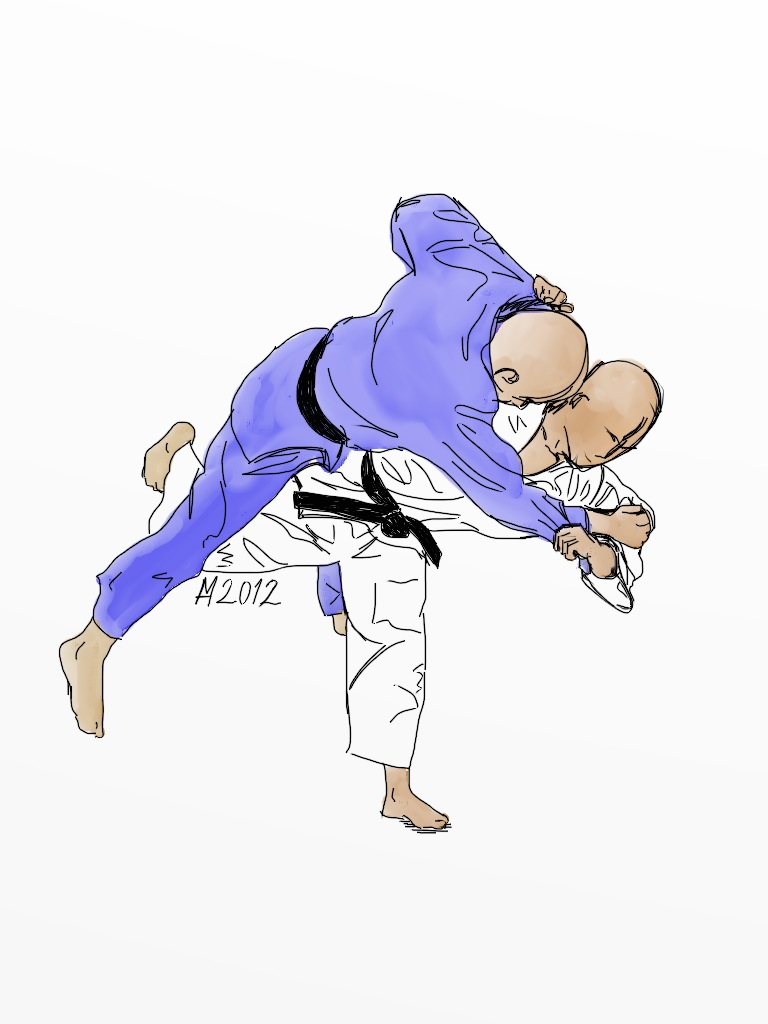
- Uchi mata (内股) - inner thigh throw

=== Ma-sutemi-waza (rear sacrifice techniques) ===
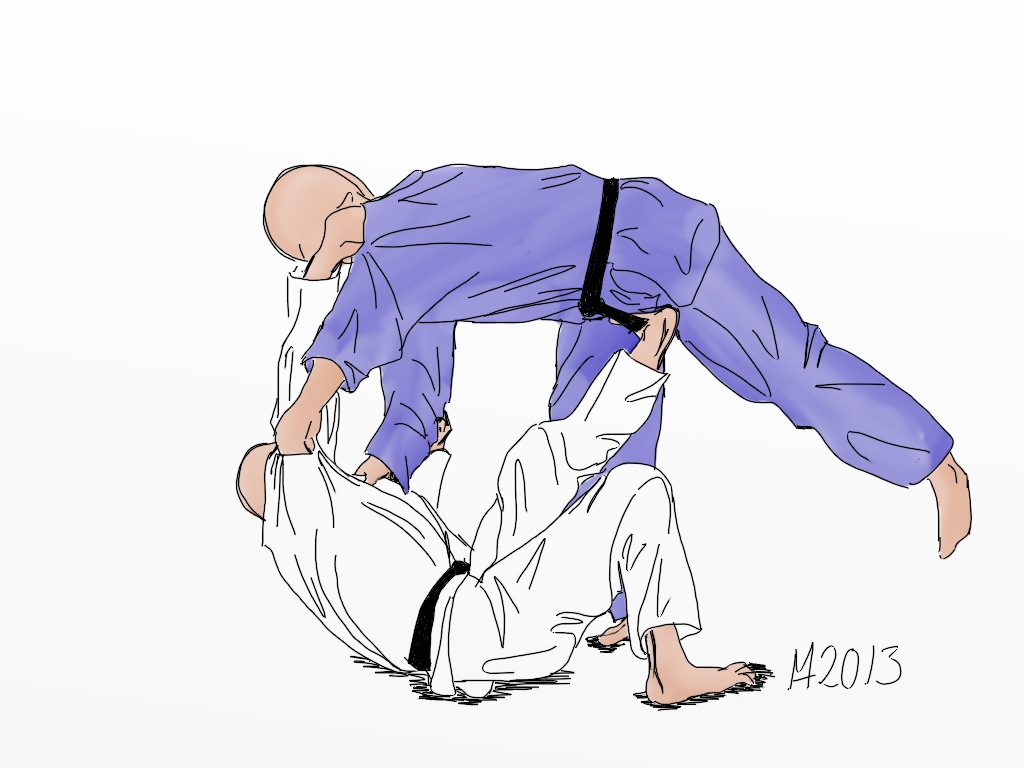
- Tomoe nage (巴投) - circle throw
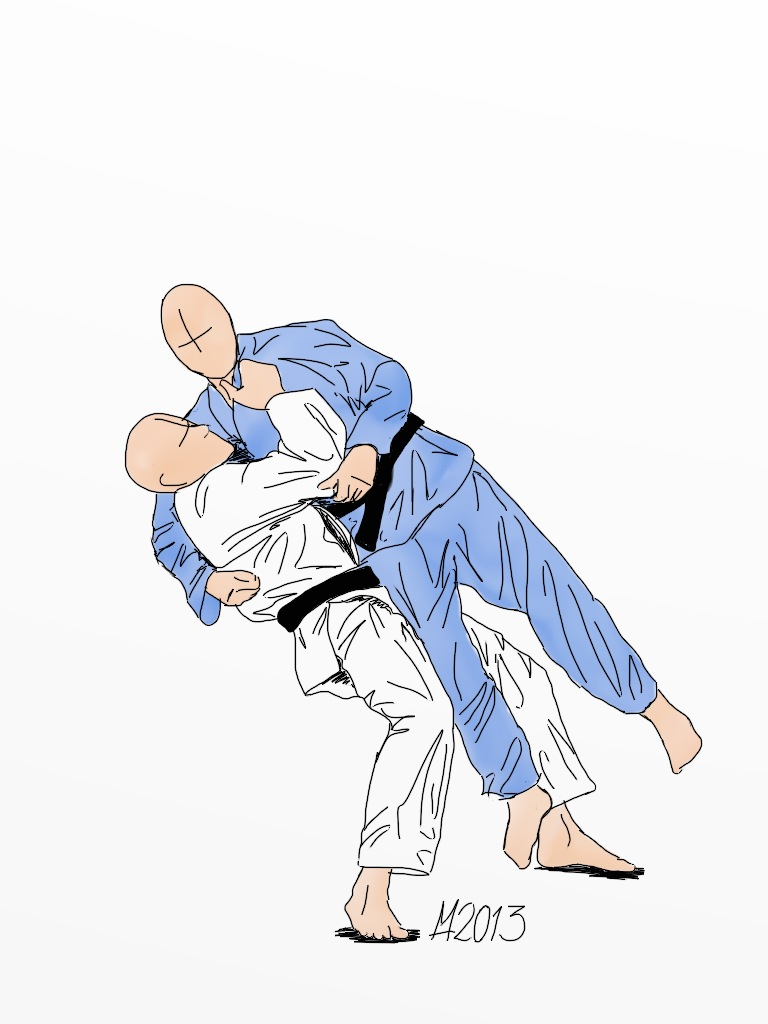
- Ura nage (裏投) - rear throw
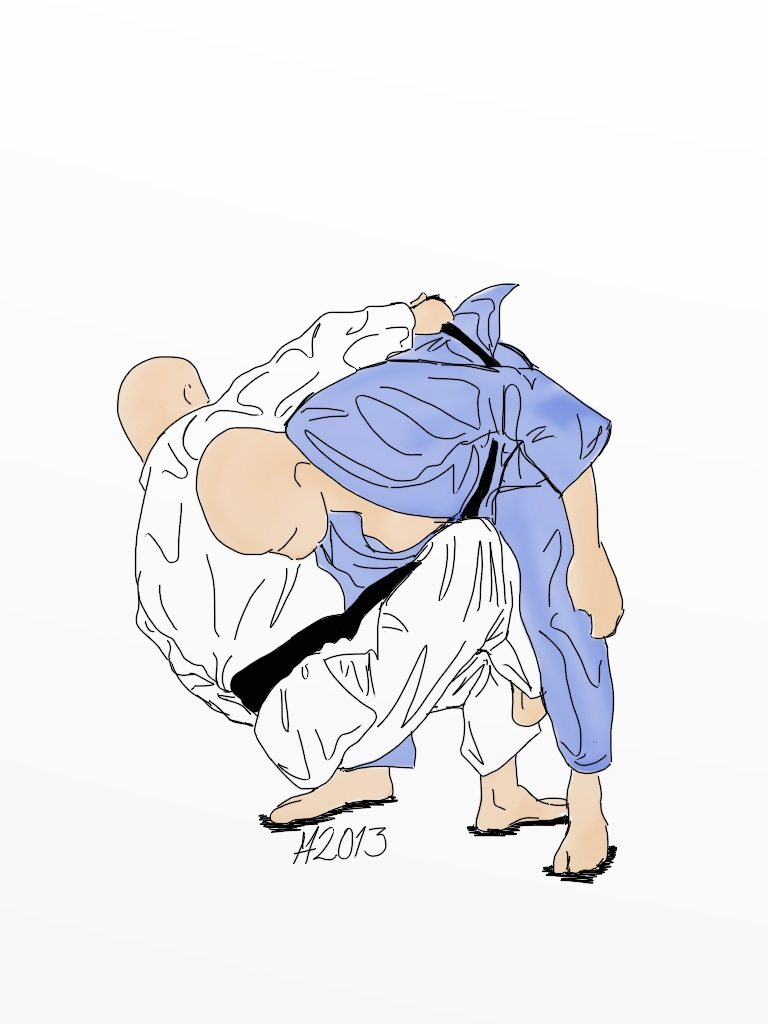
- Sumi gaeshi (隅返) - corner reversal

=== Yoko-sutemi-waza (side sacrifice techniques) ===
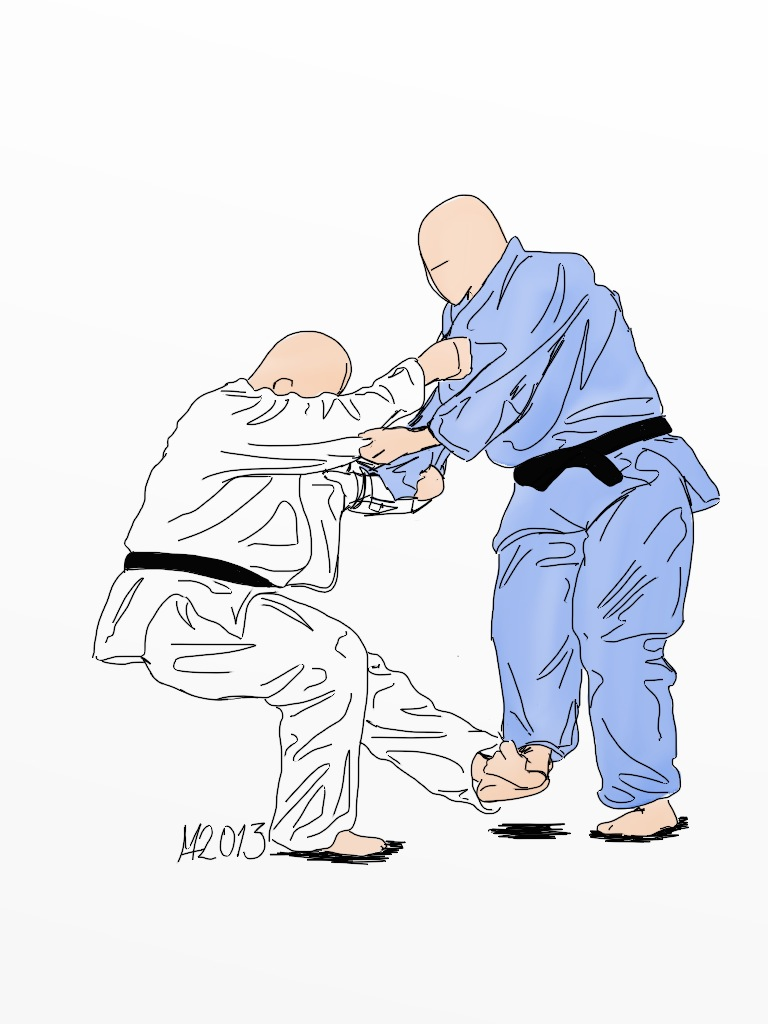
- Yoko gake (横掛) - side hook
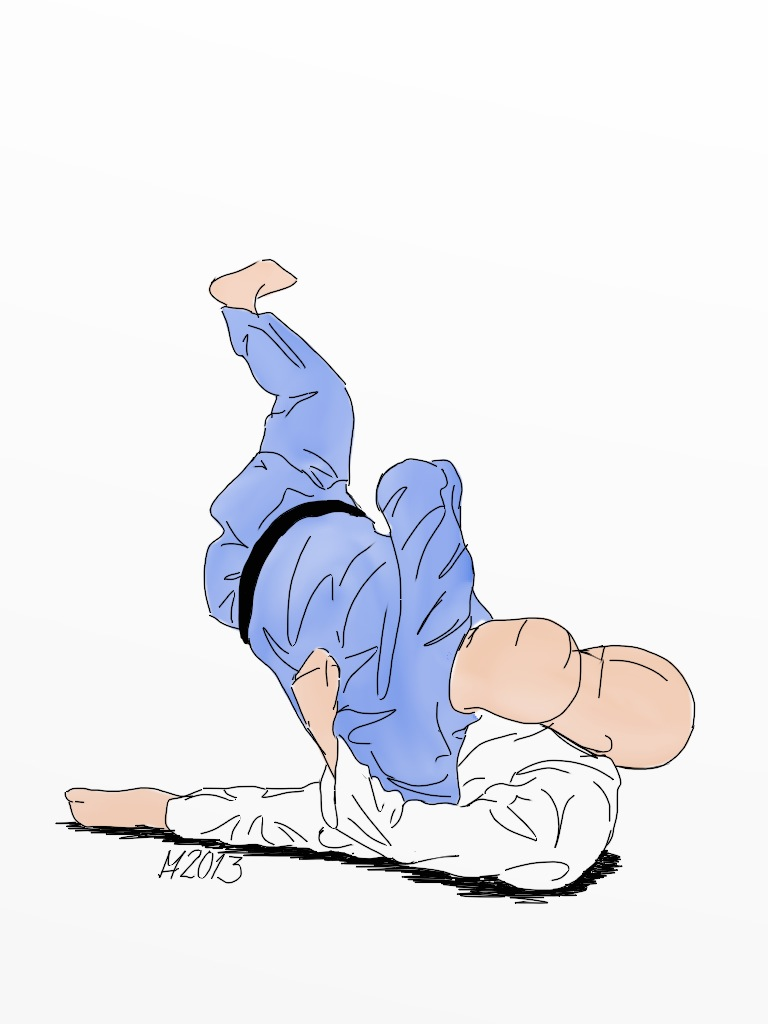
- Yoko guruma (横車) - side wheel
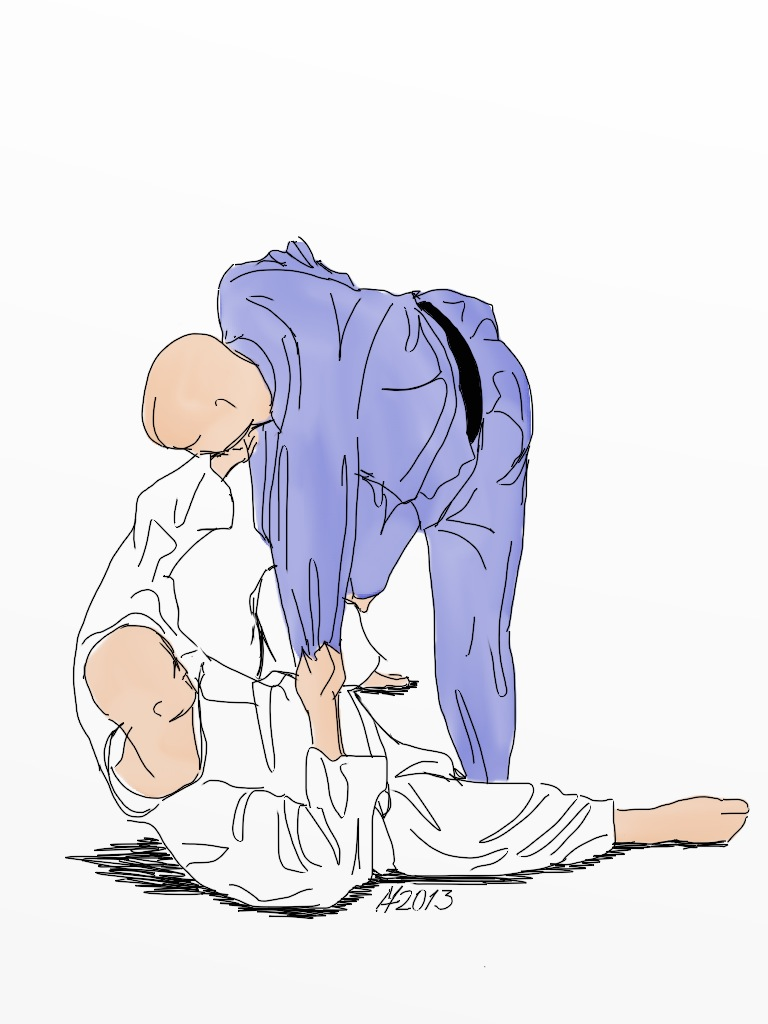
- Uki waza (浮技) - floating technique
