= Go-no-sen-no-kata =

Go no sen no kata
- Classification: Kata
- Sub classification: Non-Kodokan kata
- Kodokan: No

Technique name
- Rōmaji: Go-no-sen-no-kata
- Japanese: 後の先の形
- English: Forms of counter attack

Gonosen-no-kata (後の先の形, Forms of post-attack counter attack) is a judo kata that focuses on counter-attacks to throwing techniques. It is not an officially recognized kata of judo, but has acquired disproportionate significance by its inclusion in Kawaishi's The complete seven katas of judo. Writing in the early post-war period, Kawaishi described the kata as "being practiced less in Japan than in Europe".

However, according to recent scholarly research, gonosen-no-kata likely never even existed as any sort of kata in Japan. After Japanese judoka from Waseda University in Tokyo visited England in the 1920s and publicly demonstrated several counter-techniques developed at their home University, the exercises were henceforth in Britain (and later in France and other parts of Europe) misrepresented as a formalized kata and practiced and taught that way by Japanese judo teachers based in Europe, such as Kawaishi Mikinosuke, Koizumi Gunji, Ōtani Masutarō, and Tani Yukio.

== Techniques ==
- O soto Gari countered by O soto Gari
- Hiza Guruma countered by Hiza Guruma
- O uchi Gari countered by okuri ashi barai
- De ashi Harai countered by De Ashi Barai
- Ko soto Gake countered by Tai Otoshi
- Ko uchi Gari countered by Sasae Tsurikomi Ashi
- Kubi Nage / Tsuri goshi countered by Ushiro Goshi
- Koshi Guruma countered by Uki Goshi
- Hane Goshi countered by Sasae Tsurikomi Ashi
- Harai Goshi countered by Utsuri Goshi
- Uchi Mata countered by Te guruma
- Seoi Nage countered by Sumi Gaeshi
