= Hane goshi gaeshi =

Judo technique

- Classification: Nage-waza
- Sub classification: Ashi-waza
- Kodokan: Yes

Technique name
- Rōmaji: Hane-goshi gaeshi
- Japanese: 跳腰返
- English: Spring hip throw counter

Hane Goshi Gaeshi (跳腰返 : はねごしがえし) is a throw in judo and is categorized as a foot technique, Ashi-waza. It is one of the techniques adopted later by the Kodokan into their Shinmeisho No Waza (newly accepted techniques) list.

== Description ==
Uke attacks Tori with right hane goshi, as he does so Tori counters by hooking his left leg around Uke's lower left leg and reaps it to the right.

Alternatively, Tori lifts Uke up and reaps both his legs to the left with his right leg. Similar to harai goshi gaeshi, the counter to the sweeping hip throw.

== See also ==
- The Canon Of Judo
