= Harai goshi gaeshi =

Judo technique

- Classification: Nage-waza
- Sub classification: Ashi-waza
- Kodokan: Yes

Technique name
- Rōmaji: Harai-goshi-gaeshi
- Japanese: 払腰返
- English: Hip sweep counter

Harai Goshi Gaeshi (払腰返) is a hip sweep counter in judo. It is one of the techniques adopted later by the Kodokan into their Shinmeisho No Waza (newly accepted techniques) list. It is categorized as a foot technique, Ashi-waza.

== Description ==
Uke attacks Tori with right harai goshi, as he does so Tori counters by hooking his left leg around Uke's lower left leg and reaps it to the right.

== See also ==
- The Canon Of Judo
- Similar to hane goshi gaeshi, the counter to the spring hip throw
