= Tsubame gaeshi =

Judo technique

- Classification: Nage-waza
- Sub classification: Ashi-waza
- Kodokan: Yes

Technique name
- Rōmaji: Tsubame gaeshi
- Japanese: 燕返し
- English: Swallow counter

Tsubame Gaeshi (燕返し) is a Judo throw that falls within the seventeen techniques of the Shimmeisho no waza, officially recognised by the Kodokan in 1982. Literally translated as "Swallow Counter", Tsubame gaeshi is the countering of an ashi waza with Deashi harai from the opposite leg. A right-handed Deashi-harai executed by uke, for instance, would be avoided by tori bending his right knee, followed by a left-handed Deashi-harai. Tsubame gaeshi as a counter against uke's Deashi harai is the opening move of the Kaeshi-no-kata. As a counter against Okuriashi harai, it forms the sixth technique of the Nage-Waza-Ura-no-kata.

The name Tsubame Gaeshi is a reference to the famous technique of the legendary Japanese swordsman Sasaki Kojirō. It was an overhead katana (or, in Sasaki's case, a nodachi) stroke that was performed so swiftly it resembled the flight of a swallow, hence the name.
