= Tsurikomi goshi =

Judo technique

Tsurikomi goshi 釣込腰
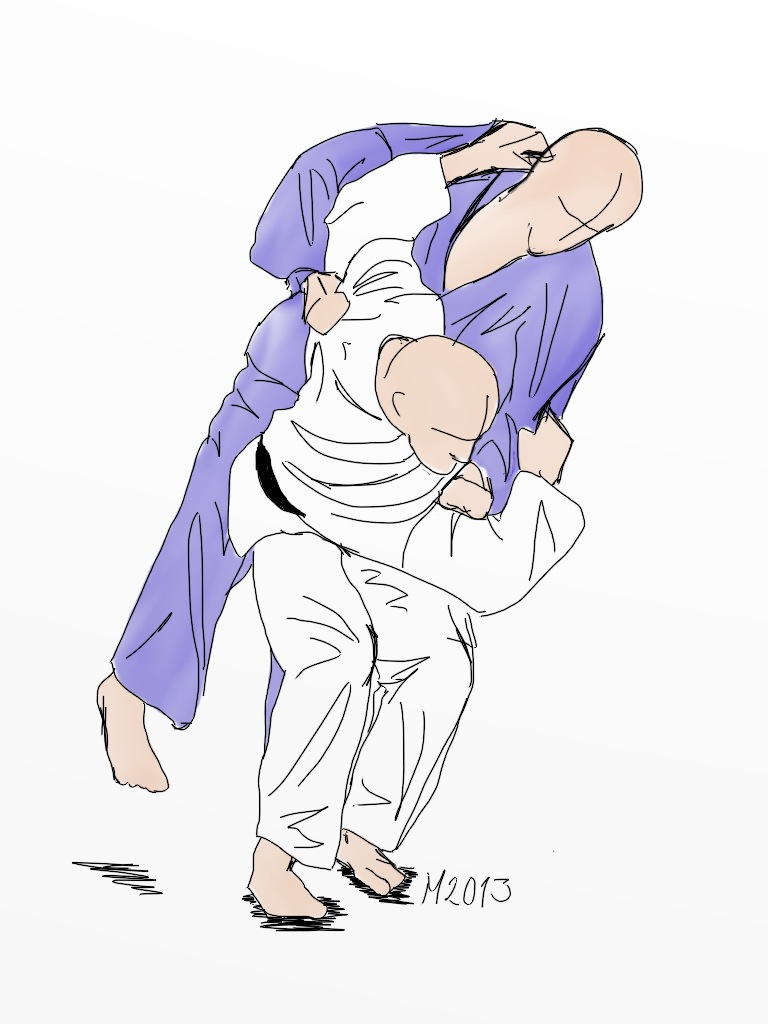
- Classification: Nage-waza
- Sub classification: Koshi-waza
- Kodokan: Yes

Technique name
- Rōmaji: Tsurikomi goshi
- Japanese: 釣込腰
- English: Lifting and pulling hip throw
- Korean: 허리 채기

Tsurikomi Goshi (釣込腰), is one of the original 40 throws of Judo as developed by Jigoro Kano. It belongs to the second group, Dai Nikyo, of the traditional throwing list, Gokyo (no waza), of Kodokan Judo. It is also part of the current 67 Throws of Kodokan Judo. It is classified as a hip throwing technique, Koshi-Waza. Tsurikomi Goshi is also one of the 20 techniques in Danzan Ryu's Nage No Te list.

== Included systems ==
Systems:

- Kodokan Judo, Judo Lists
- Danzan Ryu, Danzan Ryu Lists

Lists:

- The Canon Of Judo
- Judo technique

== Similar techniques, variants, and aliases ==
English aliases:

- Sleeve tip throw
- Lifting and pulling hip throw
