= Yoko guruma =

Judo technique

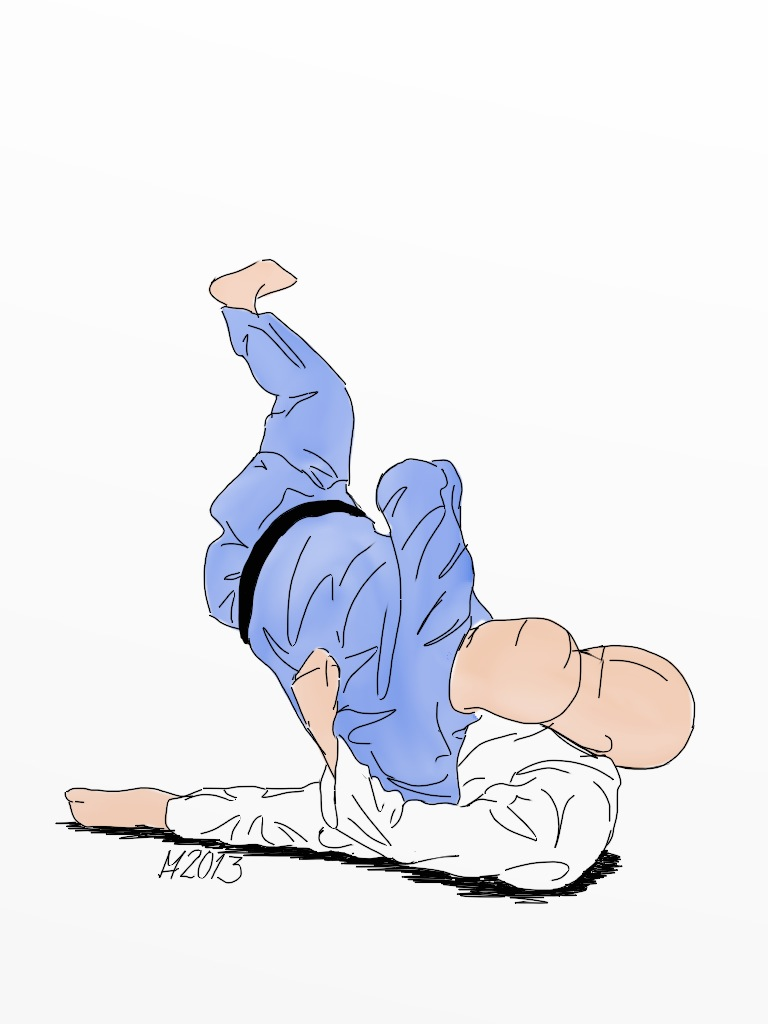
- Pen and ink Yoko-guruma illustration
- Classification: Nage-waza
- Sub classification: Sutemi-waza
- Kodokan: Yes

Technique name
- Rōmaji: Yoko guruma
- Japanese: 横車
- English: Side wheel
- Korean: 모로 돌리기

Yoko Guruma (横車) is one of the original 40 throws of judo as developed by Jigoro Kano. It belongs to the fifth group, Gokyo, of the traditional throwing list, Gokyo (no waza), of Kodokan Judo. It is also part of the current 67 throws of Kodokan Judo. It is classified as a side sacrifice technique, Yoko-sutemi. This technique is considerably difficult to perform, and can be used as either a direct attack or a counter. In classical study of nage-waza, it is preferable to use it as a counter throw to seoi-nage.

== Technique description ==
The ideal situation is represented by an imbalance in right front. Uke tries to execute his technique and Tori defends by moving to the side, slightly away from the Uke, and placing his hand on the back left and right lower abdomen of Uke. To avoid the possible counters (e.g. ura-nage); Uke will spontaneously react to fall. With a large rotational movement, Tori attempts to land on the left side by placing the right leg between those of Uke. The throw is a natural consequence of this movement and is angled in the direction of flow. Consequently, it is one of few techniques of the nage-no-kata which deviates from the axis. Since at the end Tori is on the ground on his side, if the technique fails, Tori has no opportunity to complete a combination. Uke can however, counter with the Ōuchi gari technique.
