= Ippon seoi nage =

Judo technique

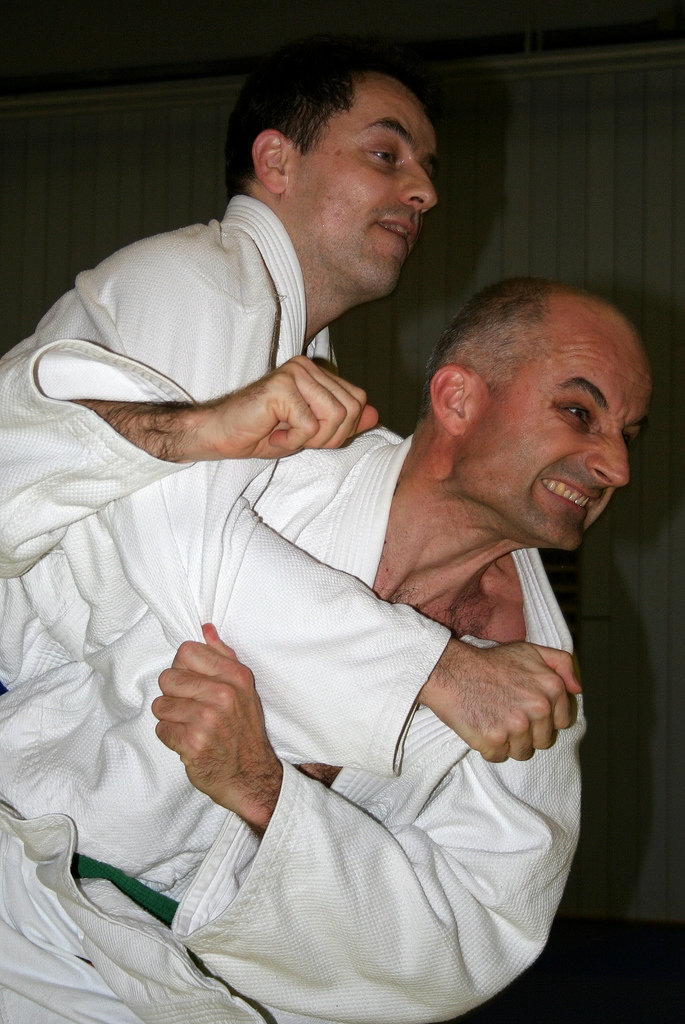
- Ippon seoi nage.
- Classification: Nage-waza
- Sub classification: Te-waza
- Kodokan: Yes

Technique name
- Rōmaji: Ippon seoi nage
- Japanese: 一本背負投
- English: One arm over the back throw
- Korean: 한팔 업어 치기

The ippon seoi nage (一本背負い投げ; lit. 'one arm over the back throw') is a throw in judo. It is a variant of Seoi nage, and is one of the nineteen accepted techniques in Shinmeisho No Waza of Kodokan Judo. It is classified as a hand throwing technique, or te-waza. Ippon seoi nage literally means "one arm over the back throw", but has also been translated as a "one arm shoulder throw", as the opponent or uke is thrown over the thrower or tori's shoulder.

== Description ==
Ippon seoi nage begins with one judo player (tori) breaking another's (uke's) balance in the forward direction. With one hand holding uke's arm, tori steps forward and turns inward. Tori then passes their arm up under uke's and clamps it. Tori lifts uke off of the ground and throws in the forward direction.

== Similar techniques and variants ==
Demonstration of a hidari-ippon-seoi-nage judo throw.

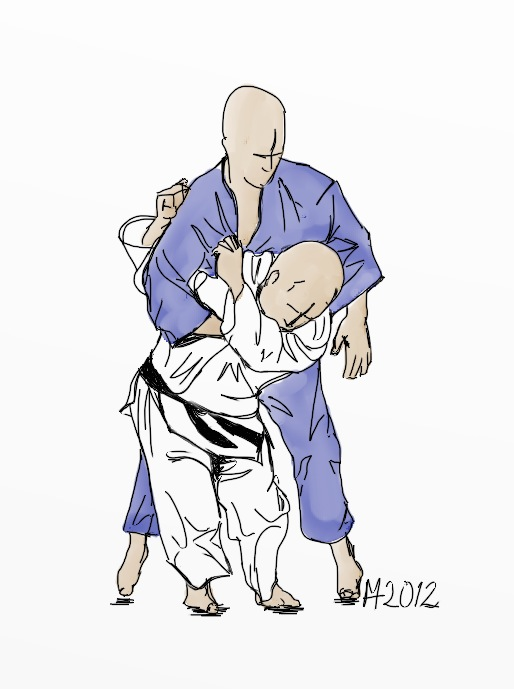
Illustration of Hidari-ippon-seoi-nage Judo throw

Ippon seoi nage is similar to morote seoi nage and other. They differ in that these throws use a two-handed grip. With morote seoi nage, tori grips the sleeve and opposite lapel, and with eri seoi nage/kate-eri-seoi-nage tori grips the sleeve and lapel on the same side.

Seoi otoshi and hidari ippon seoi nage(hidari kata seoi) are considered to be variations of ippon seoi nage. Hidari ippon seoi nage is a variation of ippon seoi nage, where instead of tori maintaining their sleeve grip and going under the same arm, they maintain the lapel grip and go under uke's other arm.

== See also ==
- List of judo techniques
- List of Kodokan judo techniques
- List of Danzan-ryū techniques
