= Seoi nage =

Judo technique

Seoi nage 背負投
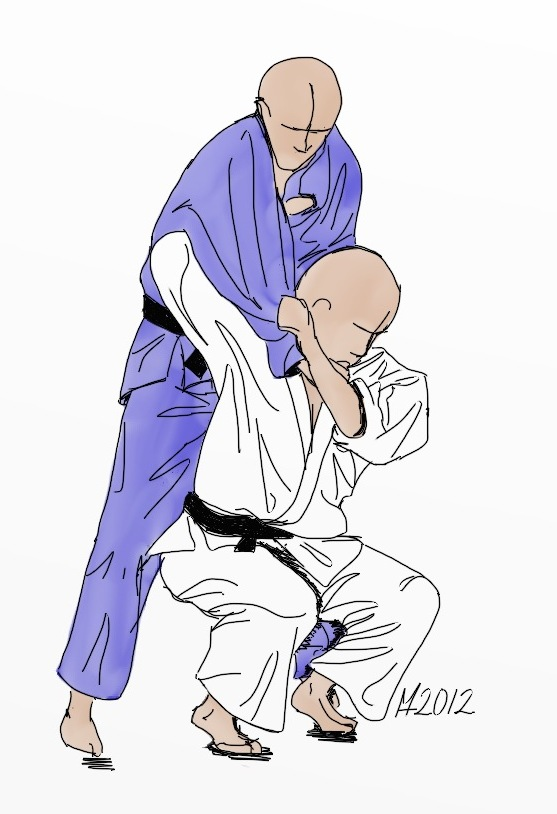
- Illustration of seoi nage
- Classification: Nage-waza
- Sub classification: Te-waza
- Targets: Arm
- Kodokan: Yes

Technique name
- Rōmaji: Seoi nage
- Japanese: 背負投 or 背負い投げ
- English: Over the back throw, shoulder throw
- Korean: 업어치기

Seoi nage (背負投 or 背負い投げ; "over the back throw" or "shoulder throw") is a throw in judo. It is one of the traditional forty throws of judo as developed by Jigoro Kano. It belongs to the first group, Dai Ikkyo, of the traditional throwing list, Gokyo (no waza), of Kodokan Judo. It is also part of the current official throws of Kodokan Judo. It is classified as a hand technique, te-waza, and is the second throw performed in the Nage-no-kata.

== Demonstrations ==

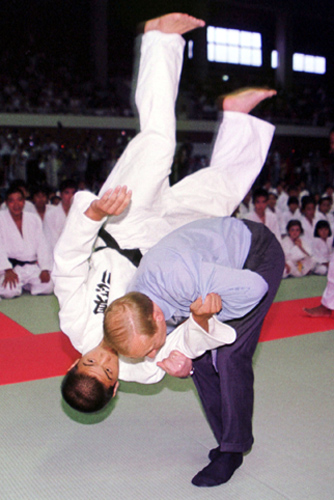

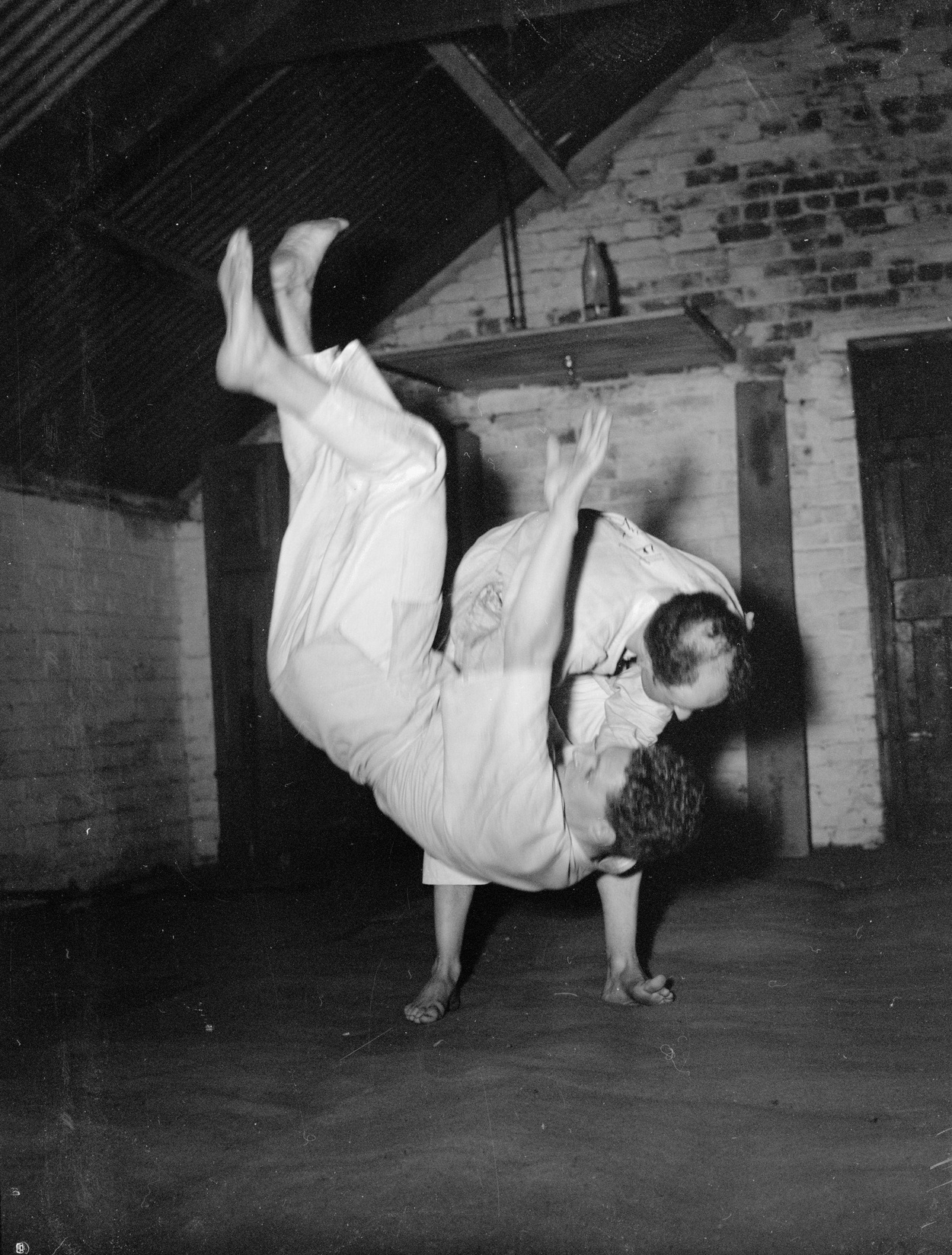

== Variations ==
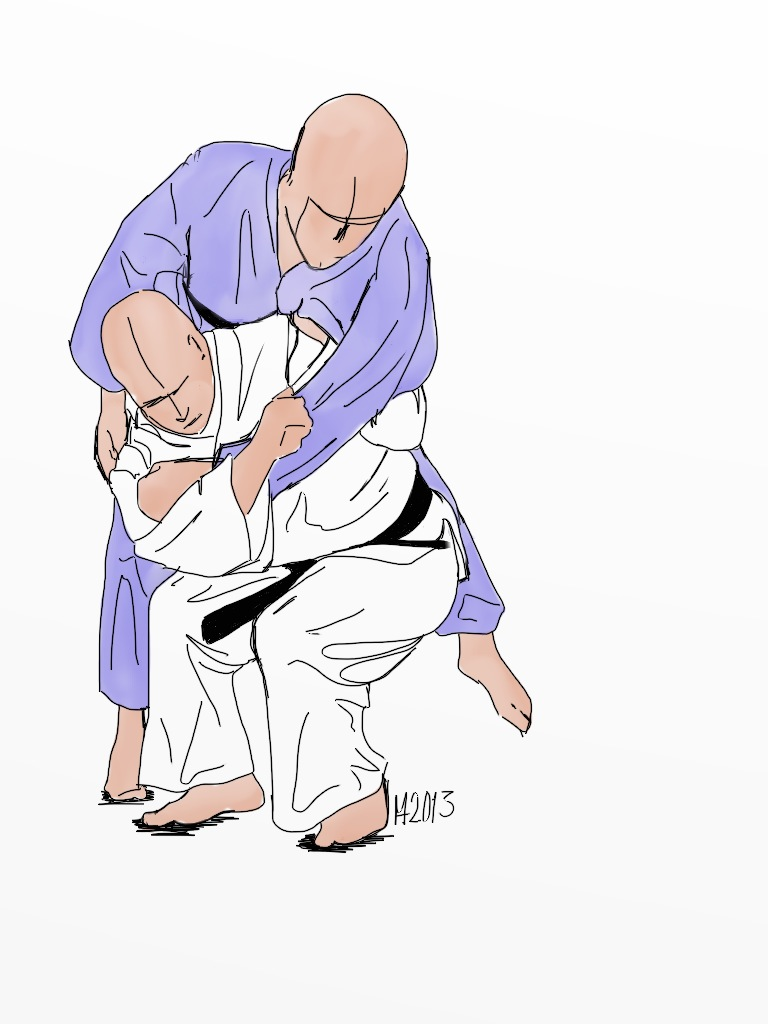
Illustration of Kata Eri Seoi from Kata-eri-kata-sode

Eri Seoi Nage/kata-eri-seoi-nage: tori grips the sleeve and lapel on the same side.

The specific techniques of morote-seoi-nage (two hands seoi-nage), or eri-seoi, are usually generalised as simply seoi-nage.

Ippon seoi-nage:

Ippon seoi-nage is a forward throw that involves securing one arm and rotating, throwing over the back or shoulder. Typically one hand remains gripping the sleeve while the other slides under uke's (the one receiving the technique) armpit or bicep. Ippon seoi nage literally means "one arm over the back throw." Renowned seoi-nage martial artists are Isao Okano and Toshihiko Koga.

Morote-seoi-nage:

Morote seoi-nage involves using both hands to grip, typically one maintains a grip on the sleeve and the other on the lapel, and rotating and throwing over the back or shoulder.

Reverse seoi-nage:

Reverse seoi-nage involves grabbing the same side lapel with both hands and rotate away from the opponent to perform the throw. It is also commonly known as a Korean Seoi Nage because many Korean practitioners utilize this move. This throw can be performed in any direction, forward or backwards. Renowned reverse seoi-nage judoka include Choi Min-ho, who popularized the variation.

The IJF 2022 rules banned reverse seoi-nage, however starting 2025, the IJF allows reverse seoi-nage again, except in cadet events where it will be penalized with a shido.

== Origin ==
Seoi nage is likely to have developed from the jujutsu throw empi nage in which an arm bar is used as leverage to throw uke over tori's shoulder.

== See also ==
- Tai otoshi same hand move but the legs are stretched
- Kodokan
- The Canon Of Judo
- Ippon Seoinage
- Isao Okano
- Toshihiko Koga
