= Obi otoshi =

Judo technique

Obi-otoshi
- Illustration of an obi-otoshi throw in Judo.
- Classification: Nage-waza
- Sub classification: Te-waza
- Kodokan: Yes

Technique name
- Rōmaji: Obi-otoshi
- Japanese: 帯落
- English: Belt drop
- Korean: 띠잡아 떨어 뜨리기

Obi Otoshi (帯落) is one of the preserved throwing techniques, or Habukareta Waza, of Judo. the 1895 Gokyo no Waza lists. A related technique with the same name is also on the Shinyo no Maki list of Danzan Ryu Jujutsu. It is categorized as a hand technique, Te-waza.

== Included systems ==
Systems:

- Kodokan Judo, List of Kodokan Judo techniques

Lists:

- The Canon Of Judo
- Judo technique

== Similar techniques, variants, and aliases ==
- Belt Drop
