= Ko soto gari =

Judo technique

Ko soto gari 小外刈
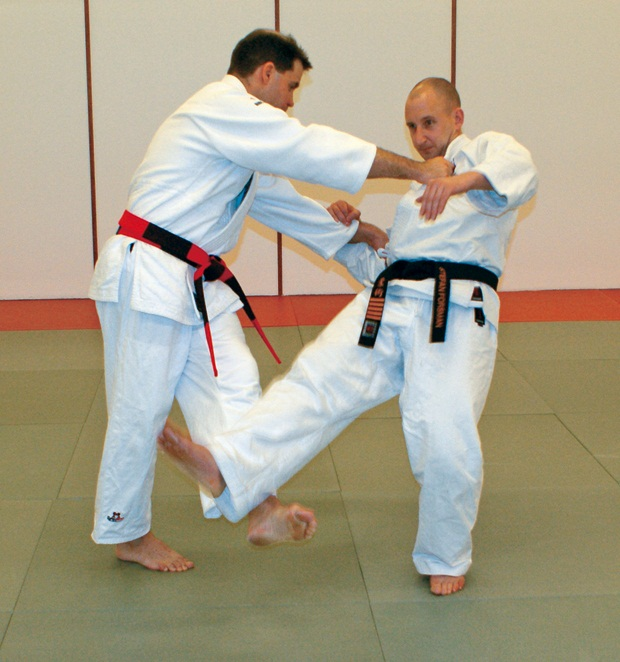
- A demonstration of ko soto gari
- Classification: Nage-waza
- Sub classification: Ashi-waza
- Targets: Leg
- Kodokan: Yes

Technique name
- Rōmaji: Ko soto gari
- Japanese: 小外刈
- English: Small outer reap, or minor outer reap
- Korean: 발뒤축 후리기

Ko soto gari (小外刈) "small outer reap", is one of the original 40 throws of Judo as developed by Jigoro Kano. It belongs to the second group, Dai Nikyo, of the traditional throwing list, Gokyo (no waza), of Kodokan Judo. It is also part of the current 67 Throws of Kodokan Judo. It is classified as a foot technique, Ashi-waza. Danzan-ryū's Soto Gama is a variant of Kosoto Gari.
