= Uki otoshi =

Judo technique

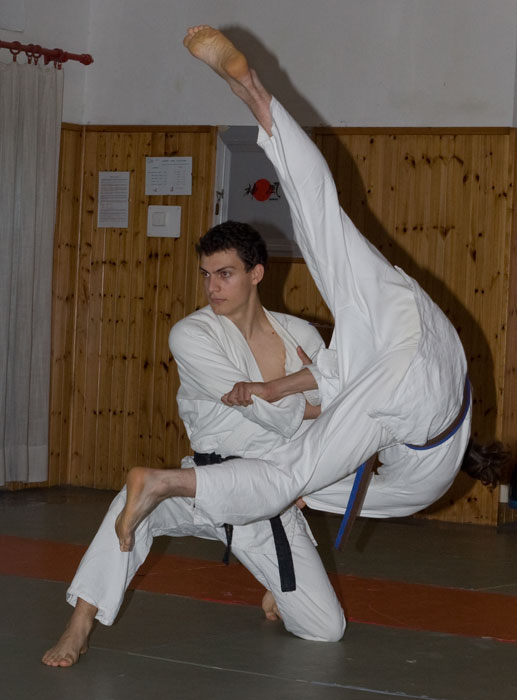
- Judoka demonstrate Uki otoshi in Kata form
- Classification: Nage-waza
- Sub classification: Te-waza
- Kodokan: Yes

Technique name
- Rōmaji: Uki otoshi
- Japanese: 浮落
- English: Floating drop
- Korean: 띄어 치기

Uki otoshi (浮落), or "floating drop," is one of the traditional forty throws of Judo as developed by Jigoro Kano. It belongs to the fourth group, Dai Yonkyo, of the traditional throwing list, Gokyo-no-Nagewaza , of Kodokan Judo. It is also part of the current 67 Throws of Kodokan Judo. The technique is categorized as a hand technique, Te-waza.

== Technical description ==
In free fight and tournaments, this throw is rarely done in its basic form, as seen in Kata. When the uke is off balance the pulling hand at the sleeve of the tori guides the uke towards the ground, without an additional force and help from legs or hips, making in 100% a hand technique(Te-Waza).

In yaku soku geiko, randori of free fighting variations can be seen by pulling at the lapels. Often they are counters to actions of the Uke. When the Uke overcommits in hipthrows (goshi-waza), the Tori can defend by stepping to the side (tai sabaki) to avoid the throw. During that action the Tori can pull at the sleeves or lapel (depending the side of grip and side of the tai sabaki), further breaking the balance of Uke, enforcing the kuzushi (losing of balance) and guiding the Uke to the ground. The same basic principle is used in Uchi Mata Sukachi.

== Similar techniques, variants, and aliases ==
English aliases:

- floating drop

Similar techniques:

- sumi otoshi: backwards oriented
- Uchi mata sukachi: a counter to uchi mata in a similar way to the execution of Uki otoshi.
