= Utsuri goshi =

Judo technique

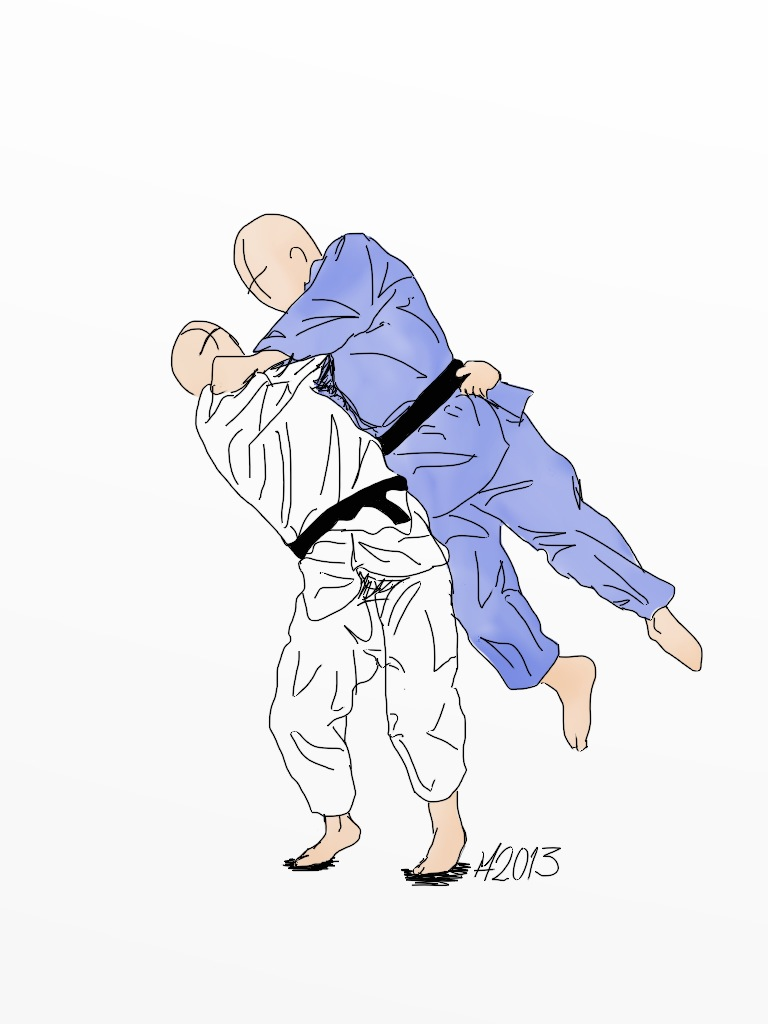
- Utsuri goshi illustration
- Classification: Nage-waza
- Sub classification: Koshi-waza
- Kodokan: Yes

Technique name
- Rōmaji: Utsuri goshi
- Japanese: 移腰
- English: Hip shift
- Korean: 허리 옮겨 치기

Utsuri Goshi (移腰), or the changing hip throw, is one of the original 40 throws of Judo as developed by Jigoro Kano. It belongs to the fourth group, Yonkyo, of the traditional throwing list, Gokyo-no-Nagewaza, of Kodokan Judo. It is also part of the current 67 Throws of Kodokan Judo. It is classified as a hip technique, Koshi-Waza.

== Technique description ==
Graphic from http://www.judoinfo.com/techdraw.htm.

Judo:judoinfo.com

Exemplar videos:

Tournament from http://www.judoinfo.com/video8.htm

== Included systems ==
Systems:

- Kodokan Judo, Judo Lists
- Danzan Ryu, Danzan Ryu Lists

Lists:

- The Canon Of Judo
- Judo technique

== Similar techniques, variants and aliases ==
Similar techniques:

- The throw starts similar as ushiro ghoshi but before guiding uke to the ground, the throw is reversed to the dorsal part of the hip of tori by simultaniosly shifting/pulling uke to the hip and turning tori to O Ghoshi

English aliases:

- Hip shift
- Switching Hip Throw
- Changing Hip Throw
