= Ko uchi gari =

Judo technique

Ko uchi gari 小内刈
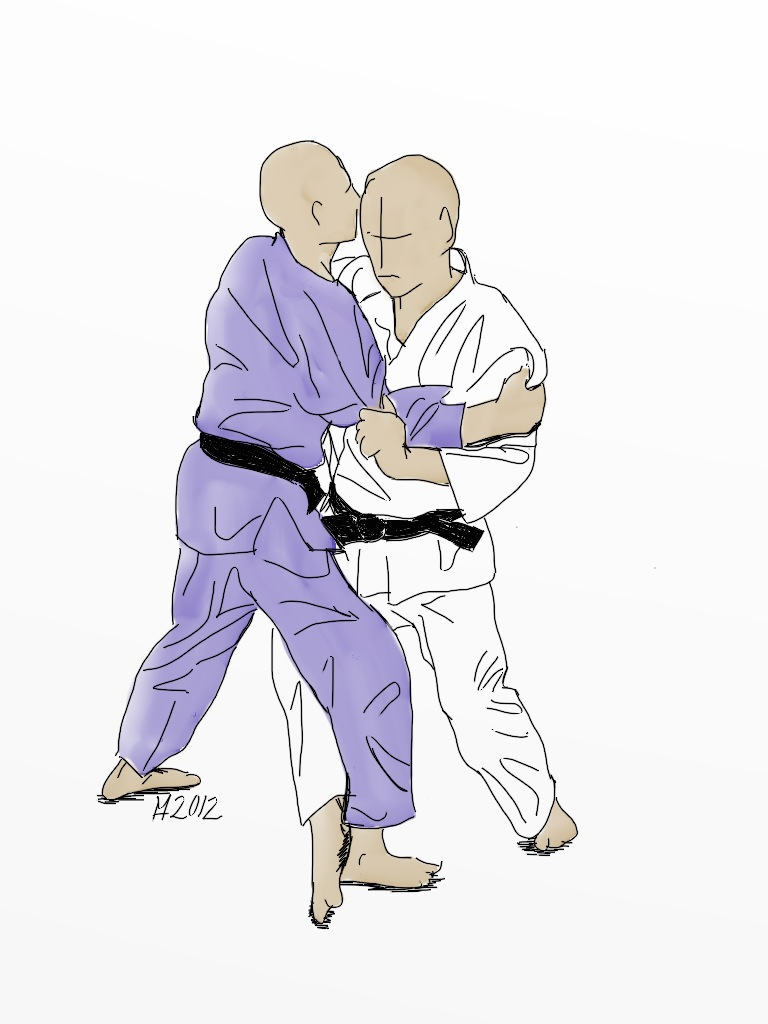
- An illustration of ko uchi gari. The judoka in white is performing the technique, using their right foot.
- Classification: Nage-waza
- Sub classification: Ashi-waza
- Targets: Leg
- Counter: Ko-uchi gaeshi
- Kodokan: Yes

Technique name
- Rōmaji: Ko uchi gari, or kouchi gari
- Japanese: 小内刈
- English: Small inner reap
- Korean: 안뒤축 후리기

Ko uchi gari (小内刈) is one of the original 40 throws of judo as developed by Jigoro Kano. It belongs to the second group, Dai Nikyo, of the traditional throwing list, Gokyo (no waza), of Kodokan judo. It is also part of the current 67 throws of Kodokan judo. It is classified as a foot technique, ashi-waza.
