= Hiza guruma =

Judo technique

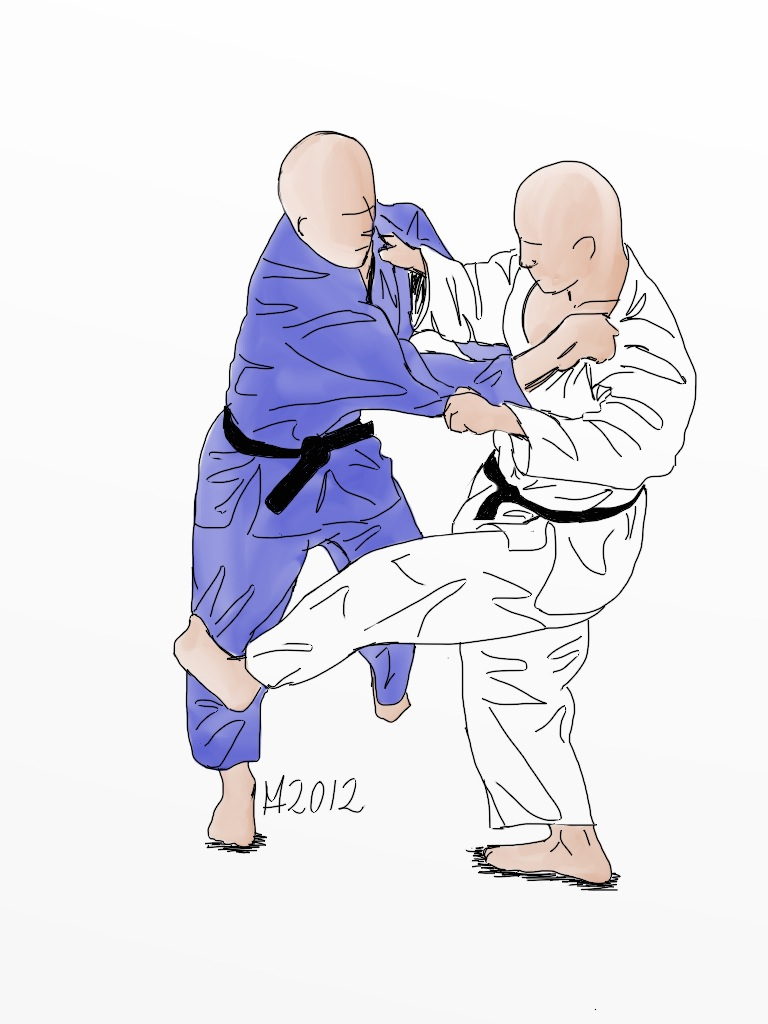
- Classification: Nage-waza
- Sub classification: Ashi-waza
- Kodokan: Yes

Technique name
- Rōmaji: Hiza guruma
- Japanese: 膝車
- English: Knee wheel
- Korean: 무릎 대돌리기

Hiza guruma (膝車) is one of the original 40 throws of judo as developed by Kano Jigoro. It belongs to the first group of the traditional throwing list in the Gokyo no waza of the Kodokan Judo. It is also included in the current 67 throws of Kodokan Judo. It is classified as a foot technique (ashiwaza). The throw is similar to sasae tsurikomi ashi.
