= Tai otoshi =

Judo technique

Tai otoshi 体落
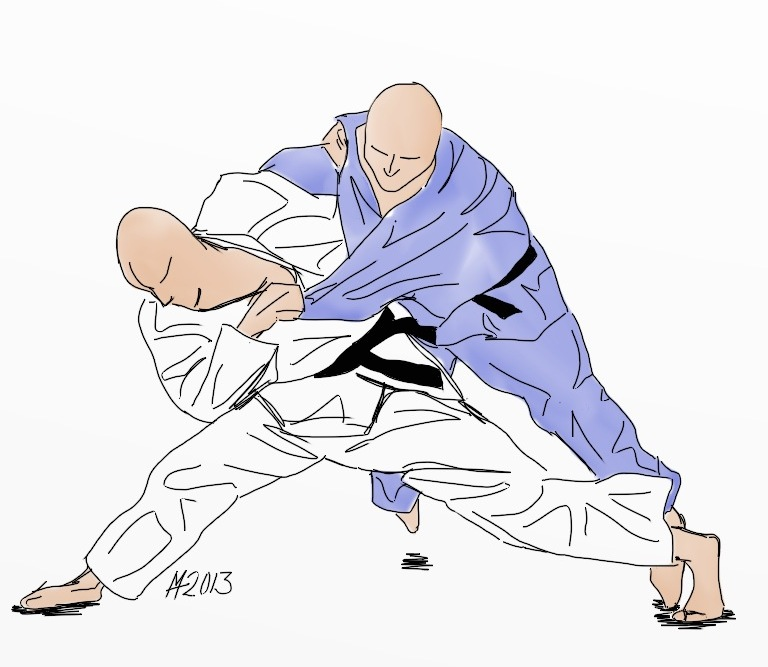
- An illustration of tai otoshi
- Classification: Nage-waza
- Sub classification: Te-waza
- Kodokan: Yes

Technique name
- Rōmaji: Tai otoshi
- Japanese: 体落
- English: Body drop
- Korean: 빗당겨치기

Tai otoshi (体落), is one of the original 40 throws of Judo as developed by Jigoro Kano. It belongs to the second group, Dai Nikyo, of the traditional throwing list, Gokyo (no waza), of Kodokan Judo. It is also part of the current 67 Throws of Kodokan Judo. It is classified as a hand technique, Te-waza.

Tai-otoshi demonstrated by Laszlo Horvath

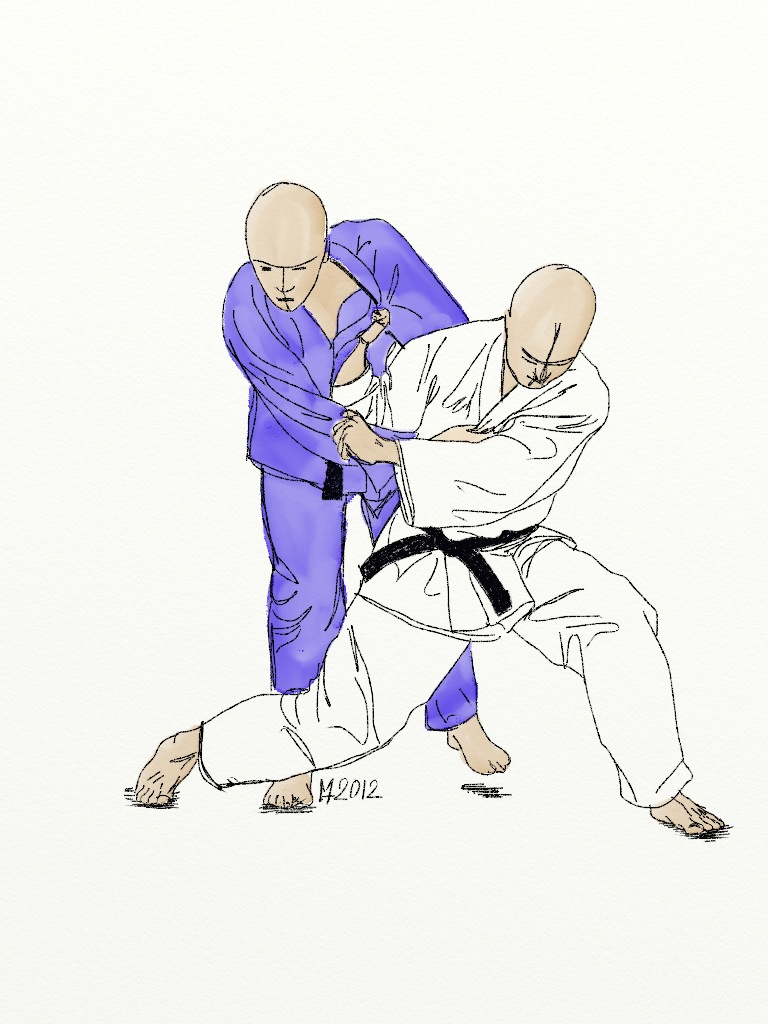
A variant of tai otoshi
