= Sasae tsurikomi ashi =

Judo technique

Sasae tsurikomi ashi 支釣込足
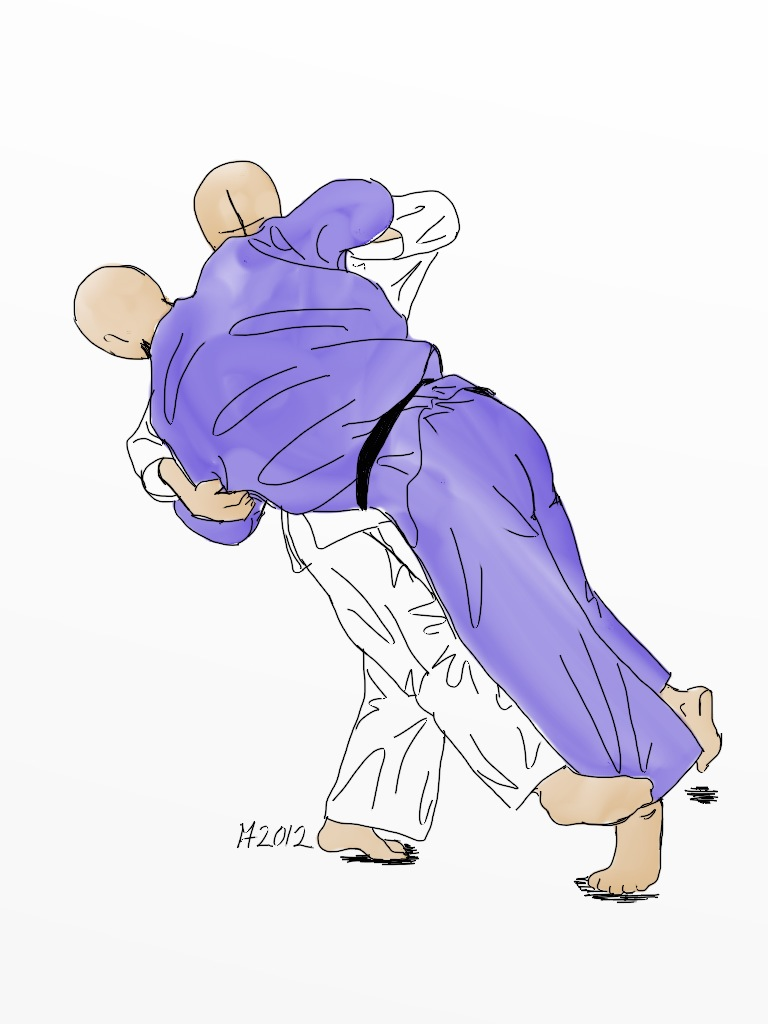
- An illustration of sasae tsurikomi ashi
- Classification: Nage-waza
- Sub classification: Ashi-waza
- Kodokan: Yes

Technique name
- Rōmaji: Sasae tsurikomi ashi
- Japanese: 支釣込足
- English: Propping lift-pull foot throw Supporting foot lift-pull throw
- Korean: 발목 받치기

Sasae tsurikomi ashi (支釣込足) is one of the traditional forty throws of Judo as developed by Jigoro Kano. Sasae tsurikomi ashi belongs to the first group, Dai Ikkyo, of the traditional throwing list, Gokyo-no-waza of Kodokan Judo. It is also part of the current 67 throws of Kodokan Judo. It is classified as a foot technique (ashi-waza)

== Technique description ==
To perform this throw, the practitioner first begins pulling their opponent towards themselves in a circular motion (towards either the left or the right side) using a grip either on the opponent's sleeve or lapel. The attacker then uses the bottom of their foot to block the opponent's leg at the shin to prevent them from stepping forward. Having been pulled forward and made unable to take a step to support their weight, the opponent falls forward.

== Similar techniques, variants, and aliases ==
The technique is often referred to simply as "sasae".

Similar techniques:

- Harai tsurikomi ashi: rather than blocking the foot as in sasae, in harai tsurikomi ashi the foot is swept away backwards.
- Hiza guruma: a very similar throw where the blocking is done on the knee.
