= Ushiro goshi =

Judo technique

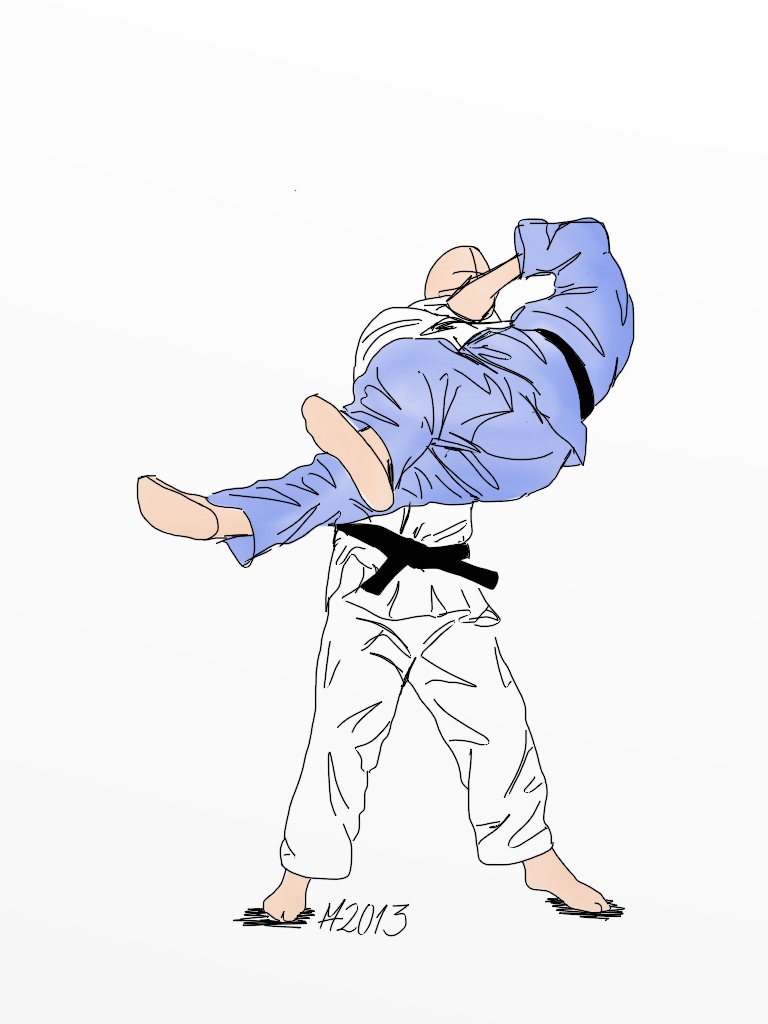
- Pen and ink Ushiro-goshi illustration
- Classification: Nage-waza
- Sub classification: Koshi-waza
- Kodokan: Yes

Technique name
- Rōmaji: Ushiro goshi
- Japanese: 後腰
- English: Rear hip (throw)
- Korean: 뒤허리 안아 메치기

Ushiro Goshi (後腰), is one of the original 40 throws of Judo as developed by Jigoro Kano. It belongs to the fifth group, Gokyo, of the traditional throwing list, Gokyo-no-Nagewaza, of Kodokan Judo. It is also part of the current 67 Throws of Kodokan Judo.

It is classified as a hip throwing technique, Koshi-Waza.

== Technique description ==
In Judo's version, tori lifts uke by lifting with the core and abdomen, and then guides uke to the ground in front of tori.

== Similar techniques, variants, and aliases ==
Aliases:

- Choke Slam
