= Harai goshi =

Judo technique

Harai goshi 払腰
- Classification: Nage-waza
- Sub classification: Koshi-waza
- Counter: Harai goshi gaeshi
- Kodokan: Yes

Technique name
- Rōmaji: Harai goshi
- Japanese: 払腰
- English: Sweeping hip throw
- Korean: 허리 후리기

Harai goshi (払腰) is one of the original 40 throws of Judo as developed by Kano Jigoro. It belongs to the second group of the traditional throwing list in the Gokyo no waza of the Kodokan Judo. It is also part of the current 67 Throws of Kodokan Judo, and classified as a hip technique (koshiwaza). Harai goshi is also one of the 20 techniques in Danzan ryu's Nagete list as well as one of the 18 throws in the Kar-do-Jitsu-Ryu martial arts system. English terms include "Sweeping hip throw" and "Hip Sweep".

== Similar techniques ==
- Harai goshi gaeshi
- Hane goshi

== Images ==
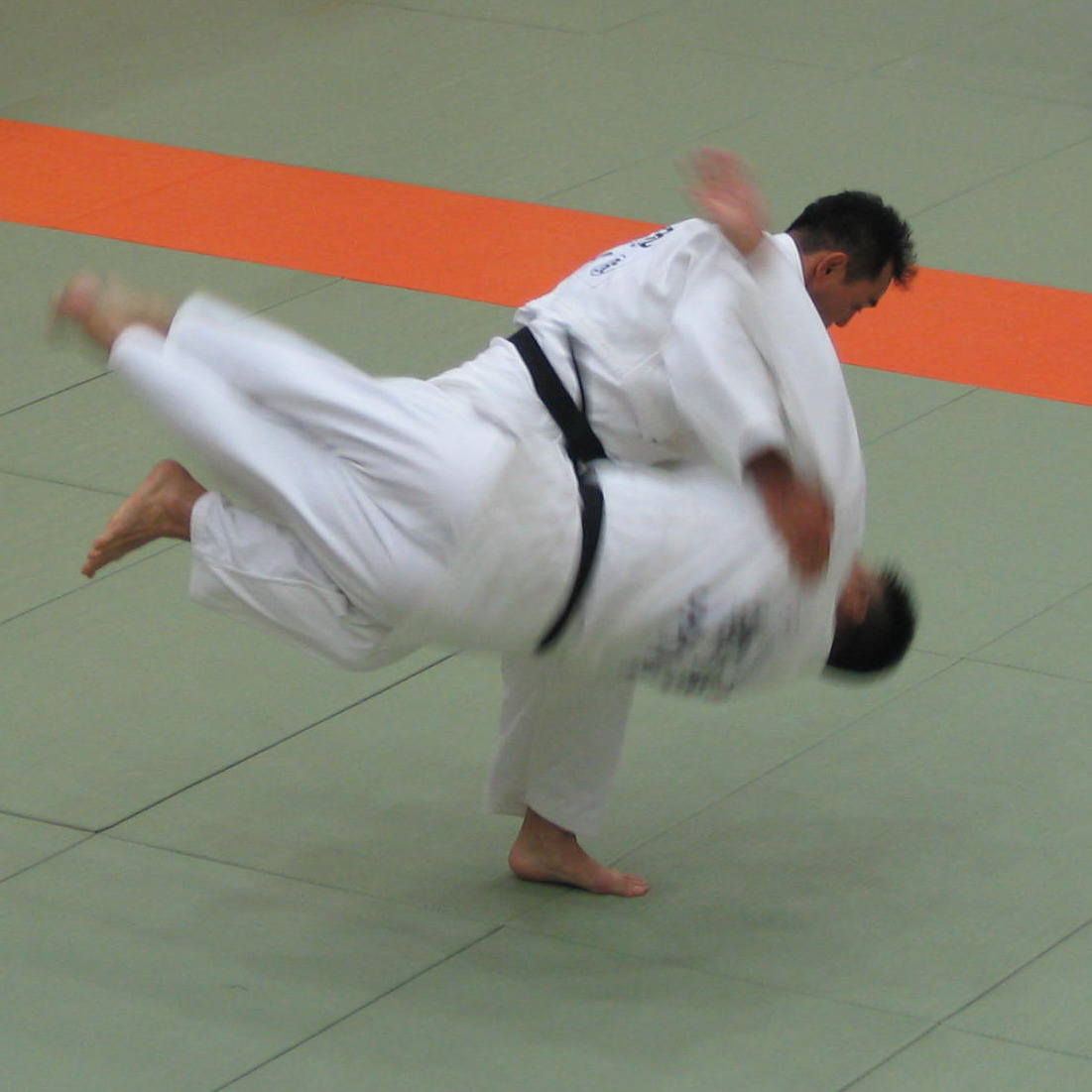
A photo of harai goshi being executed

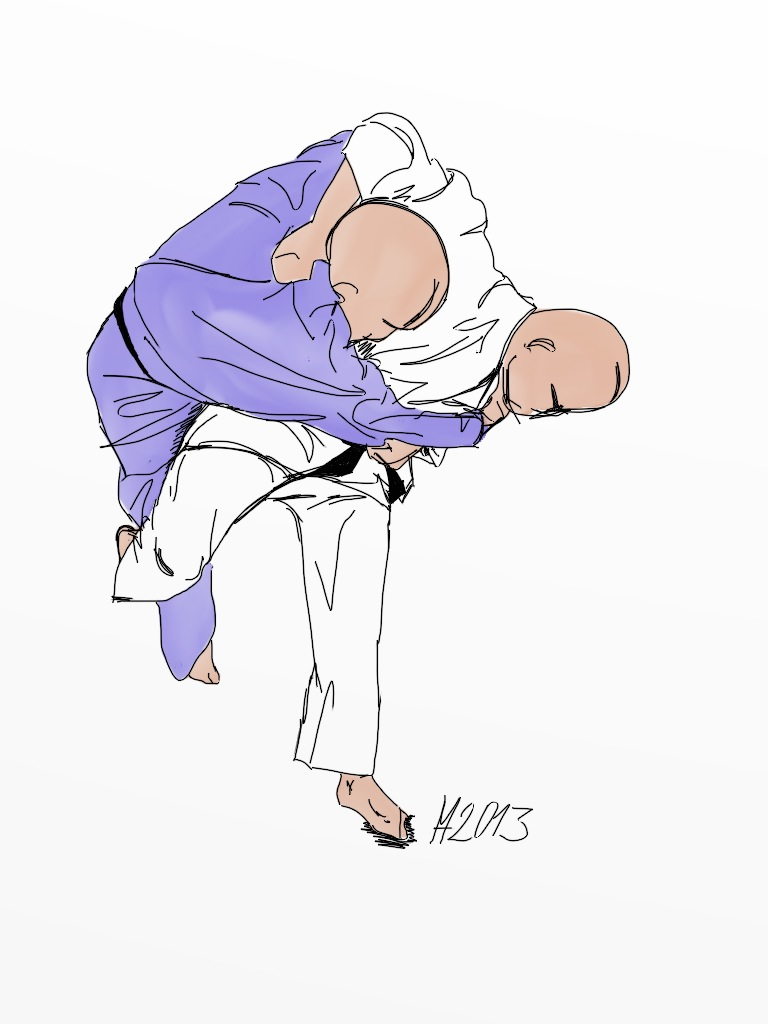
An illustration of harai goshi

== See also ==
- Judo technique
- The Canon Of Judo
