= Hane goshi =

Judo technique

Hane goshi 跳腰
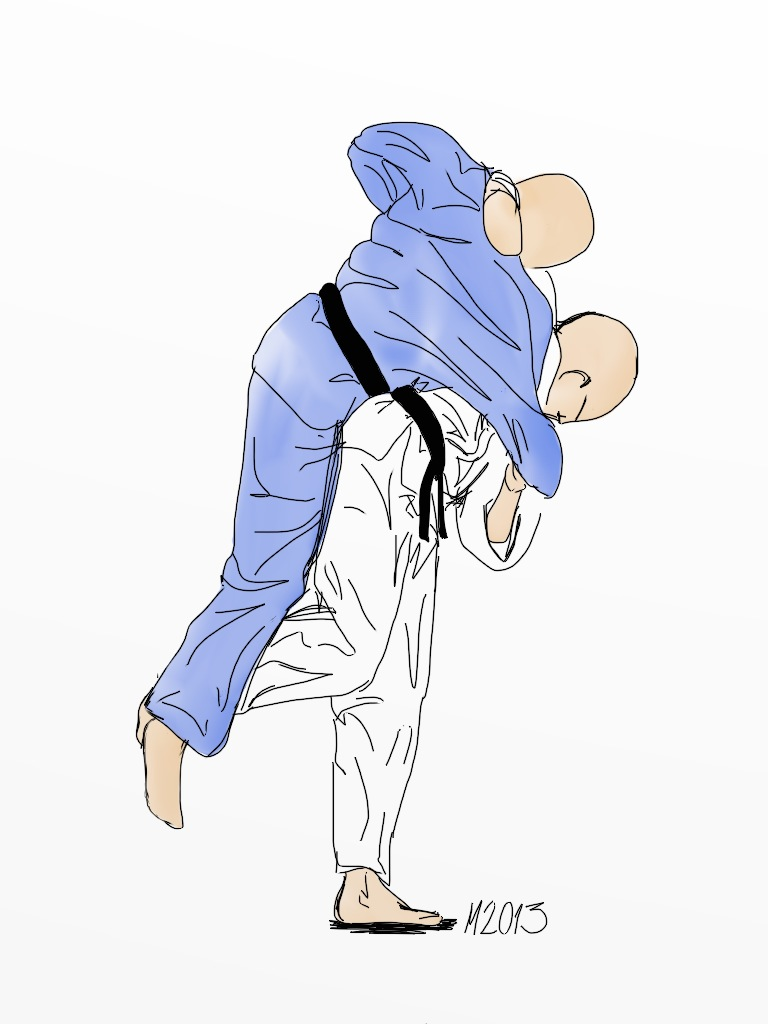
- Classification: Nage-waza
- Sub classification: Koshi-waza
- Counter: Hane goshi gaeshi
- Kodokan: Yes

Technique name
- Rōmaji: Hane goshi
- Japanese: 跳腰
- English: Spring hip throw
- Korean: 허리 튀기

Hane goshi (跳腰) is a throw in judo. It is one of the original 40 throws of Judo as developed by Jigoro Kano. It belongs to the third group, Sankyo, of the traditional throwing list, Gokyo (no waza), of Kodokan Judo. It is also part of the current 67 Throws of Kodokan Judo. It is classified as a hip technique, Koshi-Waza. Hane goshi is also one of the 20 techniques in Danzan Ryu's Nagete list.

== See also ==
- The Canon Of Judo

== Similar techniques, variants, and aliases ==
Aliases:

Similar techniques:

- Uchi mata
- Ushiro Guruma, described in The Canon Of Judo by Kyuzo Mifune as a hip throw where tori uses one of his leg much as in Hane Goshi. In the video, The Essence of Judo, Mifune demonstrates Ushiro Guruma, but notice that his foot does not quite catch uke's hip as described in The Canon Of Judo, but catches uke's inner thigh instead.
