= Uke (martial arts) =

Term in Japanese martial arts

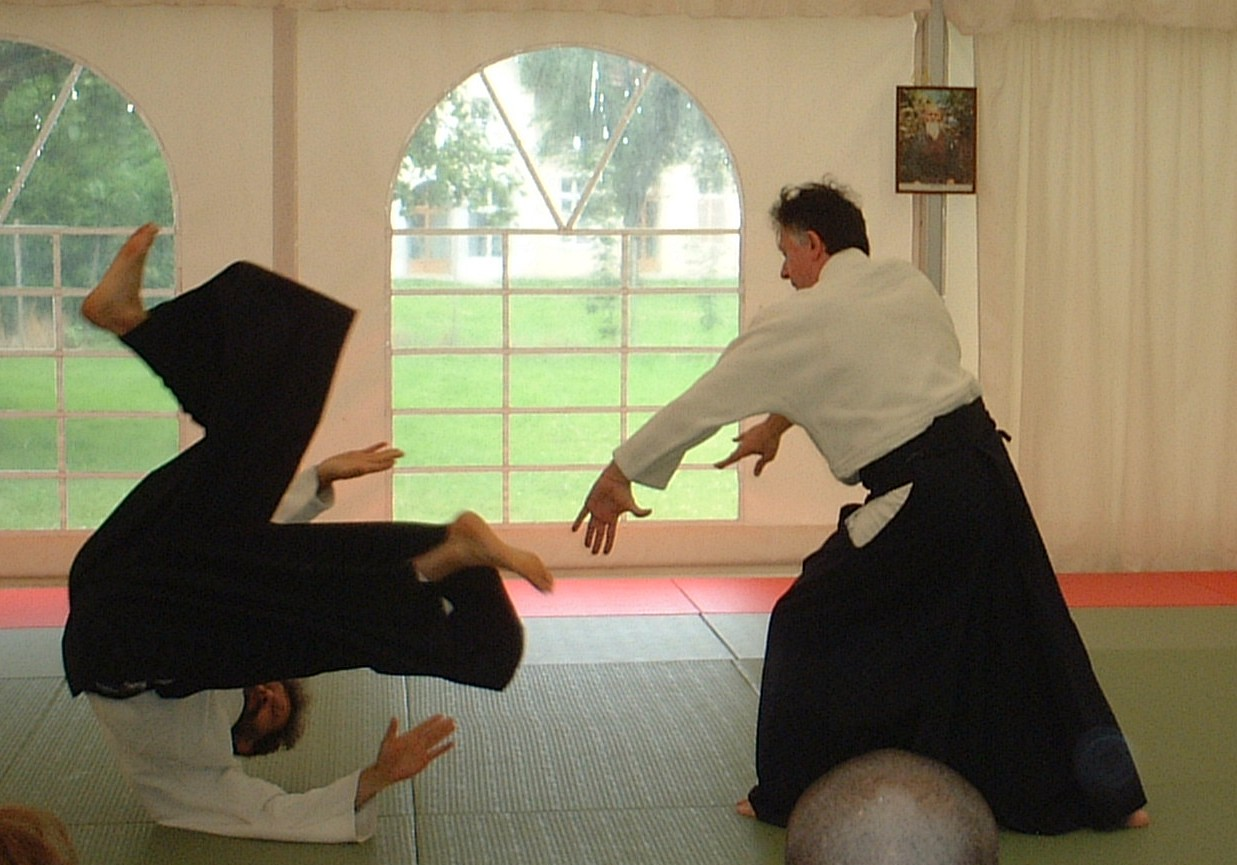
- Uke, on the left, "receiving" a throw by executing a forward roll

Japanese name
- Kanji: 受け
- Hiragana: うけ
Transcriptions
- Revised Hepburn: uke

Uke (受け) (IPA: [ɯke]) is in Japanese martial arts the person who "receives" a technique. The exact role of uke varies between the different arts and often within the art itself depending on the situation. For instance, in aikido, judo kata, and bujinkan ninjutsu, uke initiates an attack against their partner, who then defends, whereas in competition judo, there is no designated uke.

An uke typically partners with a partner or nominal opponent. The latter person may be referred to by any of several terms, again depending on the art or situation. They include nage (投げ, "thrower"), tori (取り, "grabber"), seme (攻め, "attack") and shite (仕手, "doer").

== Seme ==
The counterpart of uke is seme (攻め, せめ; "attack", "offense"), the term for a kind of psychological pressure. The seme is the one inflicting something on to the uke. It is also an attitude meant to disrupt the opponent's sense of confidence and resolution, prior to an attack.

== Ukemi ==
The action of uke is called "taking ukemi (受け身)." Literally translated as "receiving body", it is the art of knowing how to respond correctly to an attack and often incorporates skills to allow one to do so safely. These skills can include moves similar to tumbling and are often used as a valid exercise in itself. In aikido and judo training for instance, many classes begin with ukemi training as conditioning.

=== Forms ===
- Zenpō kaiten ukemi (前方回転受身) / Mae mawari ukemi (前回り受身) – a forward roll from the leading foot's shoulder to the hip on the opposite side.
- Mae ukemi (前受け身) / Zenpō ukemi (前方受身) – a forward breakfall. This can be in the form of a hard slapping breakfall or more of a forward roll like motion. There are subtleties in the different types of forward roll but the principle is that when being thrown forwards the uke (person being thrown) is able to roll out of danger in preference to sustaining an injury.
- Kōhō ukemi (後方受け身) / Ushiro ukemi (後ろ受身) – a backwards roll or fall.
- Yoko ukemi (横受け身) / Sokuhō ukemi (側方受身) – a sideways fall.
- Tobi ukemi (飛び受け身) / Zenpō hiyaku ukemi (前方飛躍受身) / Kūten ukemi (空転受身) – more of a forward flip than a roll, a cross between yoko (landing) and mae ukemi (initiation), often used in response to wrist throws. Tobu (跳ぶ or 飛ぶ) is the Japanese verb for "to jump" and "to fly".

Correct ukemi will allow the uke to suffer the least damage possible from a fall. If done correctly, the force of hitting the ground will be spread out along non-critical parts of the uke's body. By properly doing ukemi, the uke can roll out of danger and move into their next course of action without being damaged too much by hitting the ground.
