= History of collegiate wrestling =

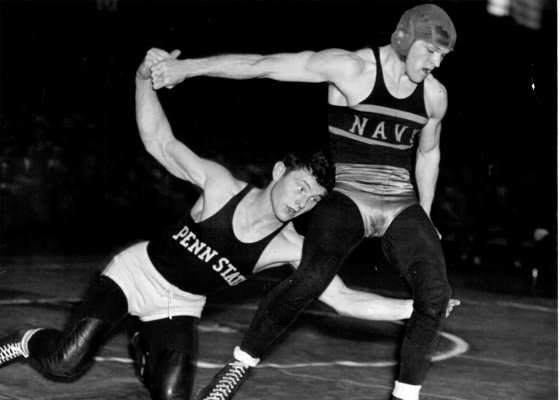
Navy vs Penn State wrestling match, 1949

The history of collegiate wrestling can be traced to the many indigenous styles of folk wrestling found in Europe, particularly in Great Britain. Those folk wrestling styles soon gained popularity in what would become the United States, and by the mid-to-late 19th century those styles, especially freestyle wrestling, emerged in gymnasiums and athletic clubs throughout the country. From then on, tournaments were sponsored and a professional circuit of wrestlers helped promote wrestling in the United States and throughout the world.

By the end of the 19th century the Amateur Athletic Union was sponsoring competitions in freestyle wrestling, and by the start of the 20th century, colleges and universities were competing in dual meets and tournaments, and such events spread to high schools and lower age levels. During the 20th century, collegiate wrestling, also known as folkstyle wrestling, evolved into a distinctly American sport which was soon regulated by the National Collegiate Athletic Association (NCAA).

== Wrestling in the early American colonial era ==
The roots of collegiate wrestling can be traced back almost as far as the earliest moments in United States history. There were already wrestling styles among Native Americans varying from tribe and nation by the 15th and 16th centuries, when the first Europeans settled. The English and French who settled on the North American continent sought out wrestling as a popular pastime. Soon, there were local champions in every settlement, with contests between them on a regional level. The colonists in what would become the United States started out with something more akin to Greco-Roman wrestling, but soon found that style too restrictive, in favor of a style with a greater allowance of holds. In the backcountry of Virginia and the Carolinas, wrestling contests were among the favorite athletic events of Scots-Irish colonists. The brutality of the matches was so great that the Assembly of Virginia had to legislate against illegal holds by prohibiting "maiming 'by gouging, plunking or putting out an eye, biting, kicking or stomping upon'" an opponent. In the backcountry, these rules and laws were largely ignored.

The Irish were known for their "collar-and-elbow" style, in which wrestlers at the start of the match would grasp each other by the collar with one hand and by the elbow with the other. From this position, wrestlers sought to achieve a fall. If no fall occurred, the wrestlers would continue grappling both standing on their feet and on the ground until a fall was made. Irish immigrants later brought this style to the United States where it soon became widespread. There was also what became known as "catch-as-catch-can" wrestling, which had a particular following in Great Britain and the variant developed in Lancashire played effect on the future of freestyle wrestling. In catch-as-catch-can wrestling, both contestants started out standing and then a wrestler sought to hold his opponent's shoulder to the ground (known as a fall). If no fall was scored, both wrestlers continued grappling on the ground, and almost all holds and techniques were allowable. A Scottish variant of Lancashire wrestling also became popular, that began with both wrestlers standing chest to chest, grasping each other with locked arms around the body, and if no fall was made, with a match continuing on the ground.

== Wrestling in the 18th and 19th century United States ==
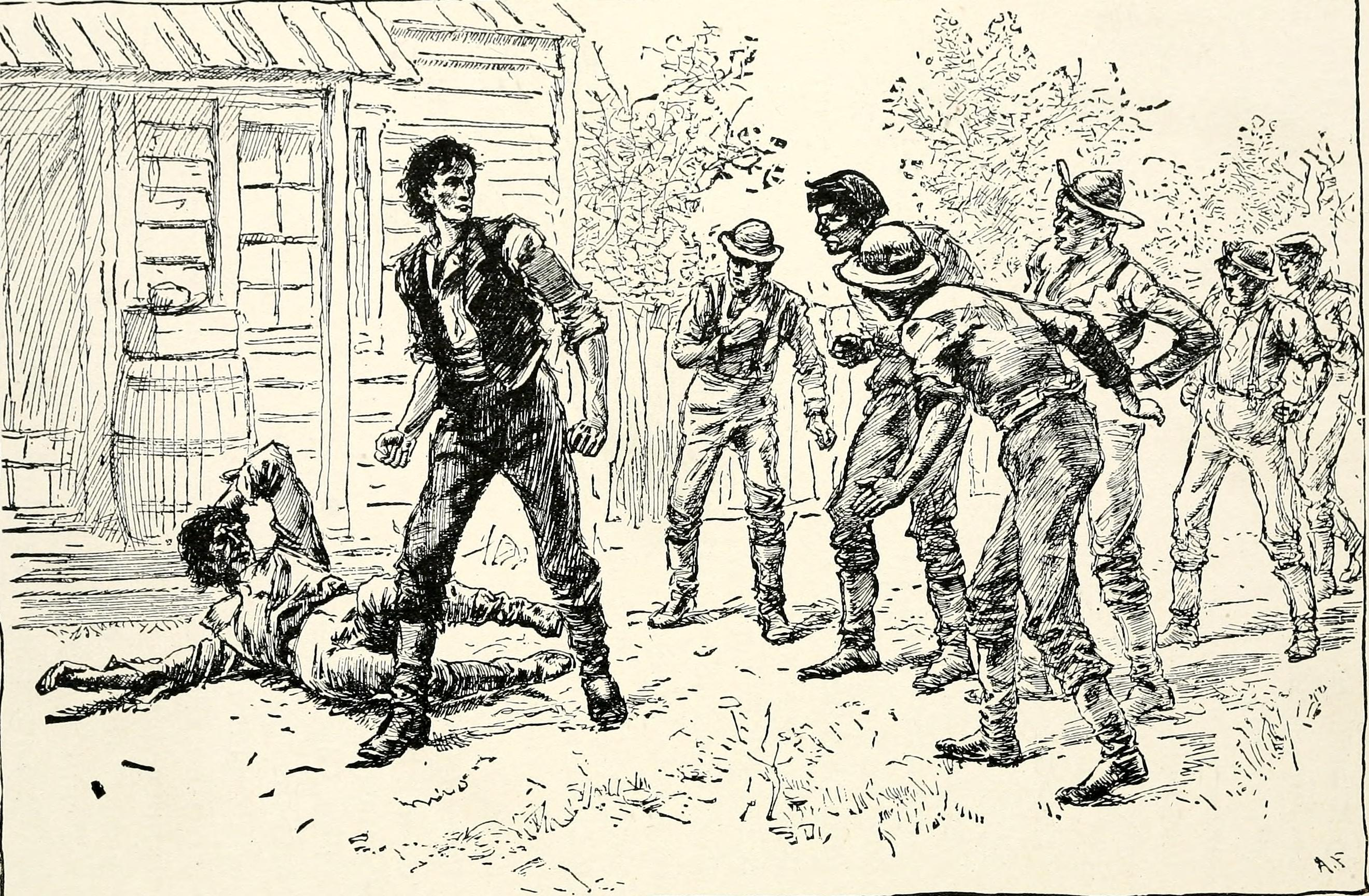
Illustration of Abraham Lincoln's wrestling bout with Jack Armstrong

By the 18th century, wrestling soon became recognized as a legitimate spectator sport, despite its roughness. It was the major physical contact sport among men of all classes, as boxing did not catch on until the 19th century. Among those who were well known for their wrestling techniques were several U.S. presidents. George Washington was known to have had a wrestling championship in Virginia in the collar-and-elbow style that was county-wide and possibly colony-wide. At the age of 47, before he became president, Washington was still able to defeat seven challengers from the Massachusetts Volunteers. Andrew Jackson and Zachary Taylor, who favored wrestling as an army sport during his days in the Illinois Volunteers, were also well known for their wrestling. Abraham Lincoln, as a 21-year-old in 1830, was the wrestling champion of his county in Illinois. At this time, while working at a store in New Salem, Illinois, Lincoln had a famous bout with Jack Armstrong, also a county wrestling champion. Lincoln won decisively when, after losing his temper when Armstrong began fouling him, he slammed Armstrong to the ground and knocked him out. Two years later, while serving as a captain in the Illinois Volunteers during the Black Hawk War, Lincoln lost his only recorded match to a soldier in another unit by fall. Wrestling was also practiced by Andrew Johnson, Ulysses S. Grant, Chester A. Arthur, and Theodore Roosevelt (who always had an inclination to anything that involved physical exercise and did regular wrestling workouts throughout his service as Governor of New York). William Howard Taft who was the heaviest of the presidents at his "best weight" of 225 lb wrestled collar-and-elbow and was also the intramural heavyweight wrestling champion at Yale University. Calvin Coolidge was described as a "tolerable good" wrestler by his father until around age 14 when he took to "duding around and daydreaming about being a big-city lawyer."

Wrestlers such as Abraham Lincoln did not settle for the collar-and-elbow as much as in a free-for-all style of wrestling that was widespread on the frontier. Since "catch-as-catch-can" wrestling was very similar, it gained great popularity in fairs and festivals in the United States during the 19th century. The collar-and-elbow style was also refined by later Irish immigrants, and gained great ground because of the success of George William Flagg from Vermont, the wrestling champion of the Army of the Potomac. After the Civil War, freestyle wrestling began to emerge as a distinct sport, and soon spread rapidly in the United States. Professional wrestling also emerged in the late 19th century (not like the "sports-entertainment" seen today). At the time of the first New York Athletic Club tournament in 1878 professional championship wrestling matches "offered purses of up to $1,000." By the 1880s, American wrestling became organized, with matches often being conducted alongside gymnastic meets and boxing tournaments in athletic clubs. The first national competition took place in 1887, with L. Chenowith of the Pastime Athletic Club winning the only weight class at 134 lb. The next year the Amateur Athletic Union (AAU) sanctioned its first national tournament, and soon became recognized as the governing body of American wrestling. The first college student-athlete to win a national championship was Winchester Osgood, a football player at the University of Pennsylvania, who won the 1895 National AAU Championship at the heavyweight division (then for wrestlers over 158 lb). Wrestling before the 20th century was dominated largely by independent athletic clubs and not by educational institutions. Prominent athletic clubs with wrestling teams included the National Turnverein of Newark, New Jersey, the Schuylkill Navy Athletic Club, St. George's Athletic Club, the Chicago Central YMCA, the Olympic Club of San Francisco, as well as various athletic clubs associated with ethnic groups such as the Chicago Hebrew Association. The National Turnverein produced George Nicholas Mehnert, who won six national AAU championships between 1902 and 1908 and lost only one of more than 100 matches to George Dole, then a student at Yale University. Mehnert was also a gold medalist at the Olympics of 1904 and 1908. Despite wrestling not yet being regulated by colleges and universities, hundreds of participants attended wrestling tournaments. The growth of cities, industrialization, and the closing of the frontier provided the necessary avenue for sports such as wrestling to increase in popularity.

== The 20th Century: American "Folkstyle" wrestling takes shape ==
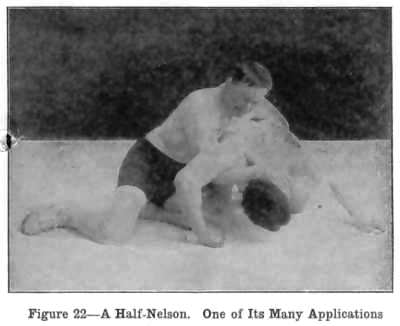
A 1913 publication by Farmer Burns illustrating basic wrestling techniques. It was around this time that collegiate wrestling in the United States was becoming widespread. The half nelson is pictured here.

In 1903, the first intercollegiate dual meet took place between Yale University and Columbia University. Under the leadership of wrestling coaches Charles Mayser at Iowa State University, William "Billy" Sheridan from Lehigh University, Dr. Raymond G. Clapp from the University of Nebraska, and Hugo M. Otopalik at Iowa State University, collegiate wrestling (also known as folkstyle wrestling) began to gain ground in varsity athletics. The Eastern Intercollegiate Wrestling Association held its first tournament in 1905, which soon sparked many more wrestling tournaments for both college and university students and high school students. The Eastern Intercollegiate Wrestling Association remained under student leadership for over 30 years. Edward Clark Gallagher, a football and track and field athlete at Oklahoma A&M College (now Oklahoma State University–Stillwater), launched wrestling as an official varsity sport just before World War I and with his team launched a dynasty, with undefeated matches from 1921 to 1931. When Oklahoma A&M hosted the national AAU championship in 1925, Gallagher's varsity team won the team championship. Also, his junior varsity teams and unattached entries placed second. The two groups won almost all of the medals at that championship.

In 1927, Clapp published the rules for collegiate wrestling, and the next year in 1928, the first NCAA Wrestling Team Championship took place on March 30 to March 31 on the campus of Iowa State College. 40 wrestlers from 16 colleges participated, and it was among the first national championships sponsored by the NCAA, the second national championship after outdoor track and field in 1921 (and the third postseason NCAA meet after both outdoor track and field and swimming in 1924). Oklahoma State University won that first championship, which was an unofficial one, and later won the first official championship in 1929. Oklahoma State would win 27 of the first 45 Wrestling Team Championships in the Division I category, including seven straight between 1937 and 1946. In 1953, Penn State University became the first team outside of the Midwest to be awarded the national championship. One of the prominent champions during that period was Myron Roderick who won three straight individual championship as a wrestler at Oklahoma State (from 1954 to 1956. Later as a coach, Roderick would lead his teams to seven championships between 1958 and 1968.

The rules of collegiate wrestling developed by Raymond G. Clapp, which were eventually adopted by the Eastern Intercollegiate Wrestling Association, marked a sharp contrast to the freestyle wrestling rules of the International Amateur Wrestling Federation (IAWF; now known as United World Wrestling) and the AAU. From then on, collegiate wrestling emerged as a distinctly American sport. Yet American collegiate wrestlers made smooth transitions in the international styles, being able to win Olympic medals in freestyle wrestling at various games. College and high school wrestling grew especially after the standardization of the NCAA wrestling rules, which applied early on to both collegiate and scholastic wrestling (with high school modifications). More colleges, universities, and junior colleges began offering dual meets and tournaments, including championships and having organized wrestling seasons. There were breaks in wrestling seasons because of World War I and World War II, but in the high schools especially, state association wrestling championships sprung up in different regions throughout the 1930s and 1940s. As amateur wrestling grew after World War II, various collegiate athletic conferences also increased the number and quality of their wrestling competition. The pattern soon developed in which more wrestlers would make the progression of wrestling in high school, being recruited by college coaches, and then entering collegiate competition.

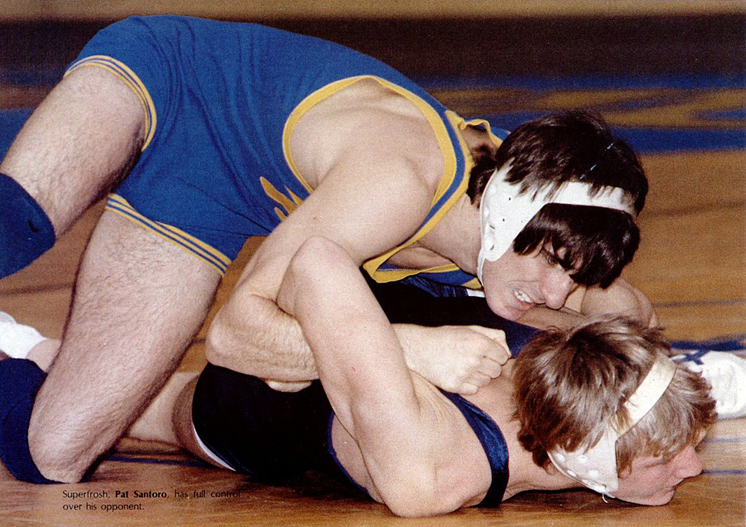
During the 20th century, folkstyle wrestling emerged as the most popular form of amateur wrestling in the United States, especially in regional hotbed wrestling areas of the Midwest, Mid-Atlantic and Southwest.

During the 20th century, collegiate (folkstyle) wrestling emerged as the most popular form of amateur wrestling in the United States, especially in regional hotbed wrestling areas of the Midwest, Mid-Atlantic, and Southwest. Wrestling matches in the United States early on were particularly long, especially among those in the Greco-Roman style. The matches most often took place in rings that were 20 feet square and set apart by three ropes. Some schools, such as Oklahoma State University, even had the wrestling rings raised on a platform, much like that of a boxing ring. Although the rules of the AAU called for the referee to determine a winner after 15 minutes of wrestling if no fall occurred, the matches of the Eastern Intercollegiate Wrestling Association were finished by falls, even if it meant an hour or more of wrestling. By 1911, collegiate wrestling rules allowed the referee to determine a win in the absence of a fall after 15 minutes. The time limits steadily decreased over the years of the 20th century. Yet for more than forty years into the 20th century, freestyle and its American counterpart collegiate wrestling, did not have a scoring system. The introduction of a point system by Oklahoma A&M wrestling coach Art Griffith, gained acceptance in 1941 and influenced the international styles as well. The following year, collegiate wrestling would mandatorily take place on open mats laid flat on the gymnasium floor; the rings and ropes were now illegal. This further made collegiate wrestling distinct from its professional counterpart, which would soon become more a form of entertainment than sport.

The 1960s and 1970s saw major developments in collegiate wrestling, with the emergence of the United States Wrestling Federation (USWF) (later called the United States Wrestling Association (USWA) and now known as USA Wrestling (USAW). The USWF, with its membership of coaches, educators, and officials, became recognized eventually as the official governing body of American wrestling and as the official representative to the United States Olympic Committee, in place of the Amateur Athletic Union. Soon, the Division II wrestling team championship was established in 1963. Western State (Colorado) won the first team championship in that division. The Division III wrestling team championship was established in 1974 with Wilkes University winning the first team championship.

Collegiate wrestlers in the 1960s, 1970s, and 1980s as usual made strides in the international styles, but were more well known for their scholastic and collegiate wrestling achievements. These wrestlers include Dan Gable, who won the Olympic gold medal in 1972 and was the Olympic freestyle coach in 1984, but was more famous for his 15 team championships as coach at the University of Iowa. John Smith also won gold medals at the Goodwill Games against a Soviet in Moscow and at the Olympic Games in 1988 and 1992. He is best known however for his two NCAA championships and his 90 straight victories for Oklahoma State University, where he later became a championship-winning coach. Ed and Lou Banach together won five individual NCAA championships for Iowa and were able to win gold medals at the 1984 Olympics. Wade Schalles of Clarion University earned a record of 821 victories, with 530 falls, which earned him a place in the Guinness Book of World Records as amateur wrestling's "all-time winning and pinning leader." Other high-achieving collegiate wrestlers who have had national, international, and Olympic wrestling championship careers include Robin Reed, Kenny Monday, Cael Sanderson, Temoer Terry, Bruce Baumgartner, and Kurt Angle (who would also become a major star in professional wrestling).

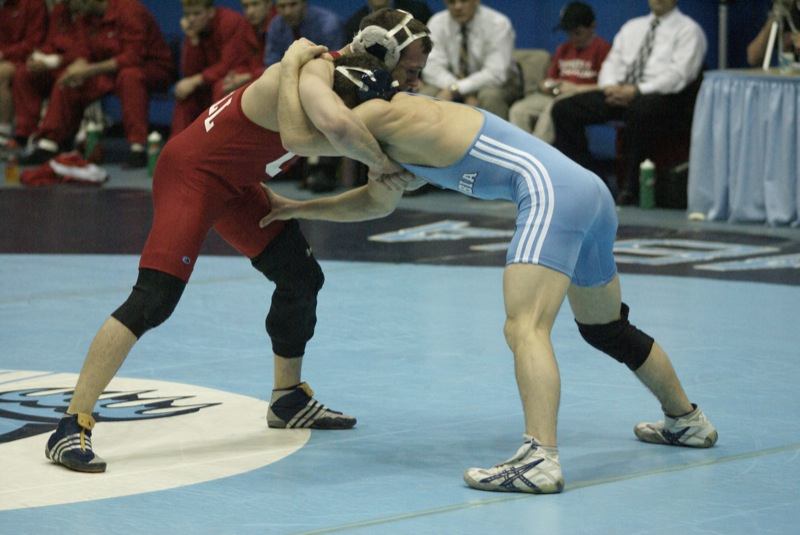
Cornell and Columbia wrestlers in dual team match, 2007

Today, on the collegiate level, several universities are known for regularly having competitive wrestling teams. The Iowa Hawkeyes (University of Iowa) wrestling team, the Oklahoma State Cowboys (Oklahoma State University) wrestling team, the Iowa State Cyclones (Iowa State University) wrestling team, and the Oklahoma Sooners (University of Oklahoma) wrestling team are four of the most storied and honored programs in the country and have won the majority of NCAA wrestling team championships. Other wrestling programs that were or are at the top include the wrestling teams of the Minnesota Golden Gophers (University of Minnesota), Ohio State Buckeyes (Ohio State University), the Oregon State Beavers (Oregon State University), the Lehigh Mountain Hawks (Lehigh University), the Penn State Nittany Lions (Pennsylvania State University), the Pittsburgh Panthers (University of Pittsburgh), the now-defunct Omaha Mavericks (University of Nebraska Omaha), the Northwestern Wildcats (Northwestern University), the Northern Iowa Panthers (University of Northern Iowa), Augsburg University, and Wartburg College. Collegiate wrestling teams compete for the NCAA wrestling championship each year. The NCAA awards individual championships in the 10 weight classes, as well as a team title. The Dan Gable International Wrestling Institute and Museum is located in Waterloo, Iowa. The Oklahoma State campus in Stillwater, Oklahoma is host to the National Wrestling Hall of Fame and Museum. Today, the various state high school associations also host annual wrestling championships for individuals and for teams.

== List of Defunct Wrestling Programs ==
School	City & State	Nickname	Year dropped	Conference
LSU	Baton Rouge, Louisiana	Tigers	1985	Southeastern
UO	Eugene, Oregon	Ducks	2008	PAC-12 Conference
Fresno State	Fresno, California	Fresno State Bulldogs	2021	Big 12 Conference
ND	South Bend, Indiana	Notre Dame Fighting Irish	1992	Independent
CU-Boulder	Boulder, Colorado	Buffaloes	1980	Big 8 Conference

== See also ==
- Collegiate wrestling
- Amateur wrestling
- Freestyle wrestling
- Greco-Roman wrestling
- Folk wrestling
- Professional wrestling
- Collegiate wrestling moves
