= Collegiate wrestling =

Wrestling style

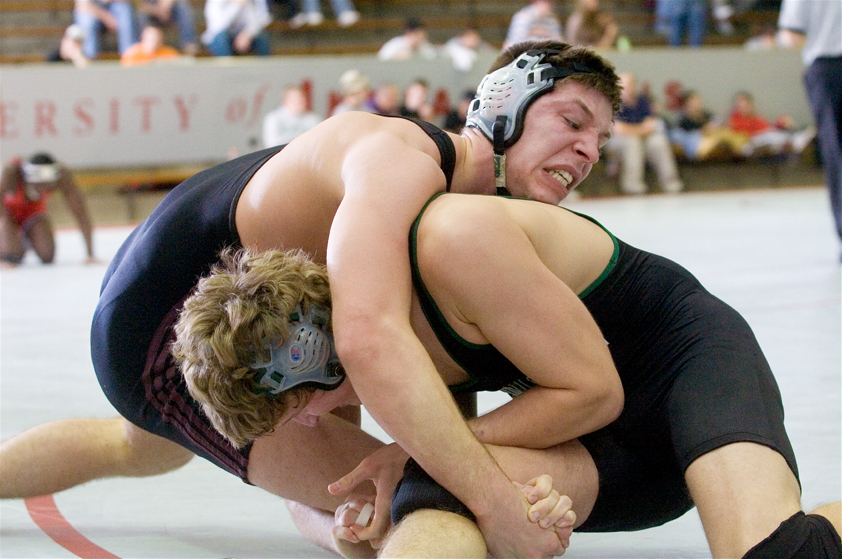
- Collegiate wrestling, like freestyle wrestling, has its origins in catch wrestling but became distinctly American by the 20th century.
- Also known as: Folkstyle wrestling
- Focus: Wrestling, grappling
- Hardness: Full-contact
- Country of origin: United States
- Famous practitioners: Carlton Haselrig, Edward C. Gallagher, Danny Hodge, Verne Gagne, Jack Brisco, Kurt Angle, Brock Lesnar, Jake Hager, Bruce Baumgartner, Mark Coleman, Cain Velasquez, Daniel Cormier, Stephen Neal, Dan Henderson, Jon Jones, Katsutoshi Naito, Yojiro Uetake, Greg Jones, Anthony Robles, Dan Severn, Rulon Gardner, Tab Thacker, Leroy Kemp, Vladimir Matyushenko, Brandon Slay, Joe Williams, Dan Gable, Cary Kolat, Cliff Keen, Dave Schultz, Mark Schultz, John Smith, Pat Smith, Robin Reed, Cael Sanderson, Ben Askren, Johny Hendricks, Kyle Dake, Jordan Burroughs, Colby Covington, Justin Gaethje, Matt Hughes, Chael Sonnen, Aljamain Sterling, Kamaru Usman, David Taylor, Kyle Snyder, Logan Stieber, Yianni Diakomihalis, Spencer Lee, Carter Starocci, Jesse Delgado, Bo Nickal, Zain Retherford
- Parenthood: Catch wrestling

Collegiate wrestling, commonly referred to as folkstyle wrestling, is the form of wrestling practiced by men at the post-secondary level in the United States. This style of wrestling is also practiced at the high school, middle school, and elementary levels with some modifications.

The rules and style of collegiate/folkstyle wrestling differ from the Olympic styles of freestyle and Greco-Roman wrestling. Collegiate and freestyle wrestling, unlike Greco-Roman, also both allow the use of the wrestler's or their opponent's legs in offense and defense. There are collegiate wrestling programs in almost all U.S. states, and one university in Canada.

Women's wrestling at the U.S. college level uses two different rulesets. The National Wrestling Coaches Association, whose women's division is now recognized by the NCAA as part of its Emerging Sports for Women program, uses the freestyle ruleset as defined by the sport's international governing body, United World Wrestling. The National Collegiate Wrestling Association, a separate governing body that conducts competition for colleges and universities parallel to but outside the scope of the NCAA, uses collegiate rules in its women's division.

Organizations that oversee collegiate wrestling competition are NCAA Divisions I, II, and III, the NAIA, the NJCAA, the CCCAA, and the NCWA. Wrestling scholarships are offered to student athletes in NCAA Divisions I and II, the NAIA, and the NJCAA.

== Contrast with the international styles ==
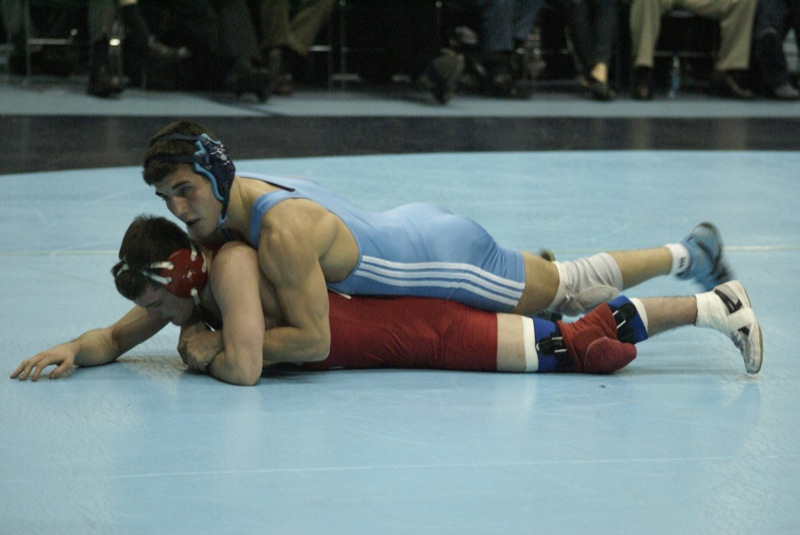
In collegiate wrestling, like scholastic wrestling, great emphasis is placed on one wrestler's control of the opponent on the mat, usually by controlling the opponent's legs or torso. When a wrestler gains control and maintains restraining power over an opponent, as seen here, they are said to be in the position of advantage.

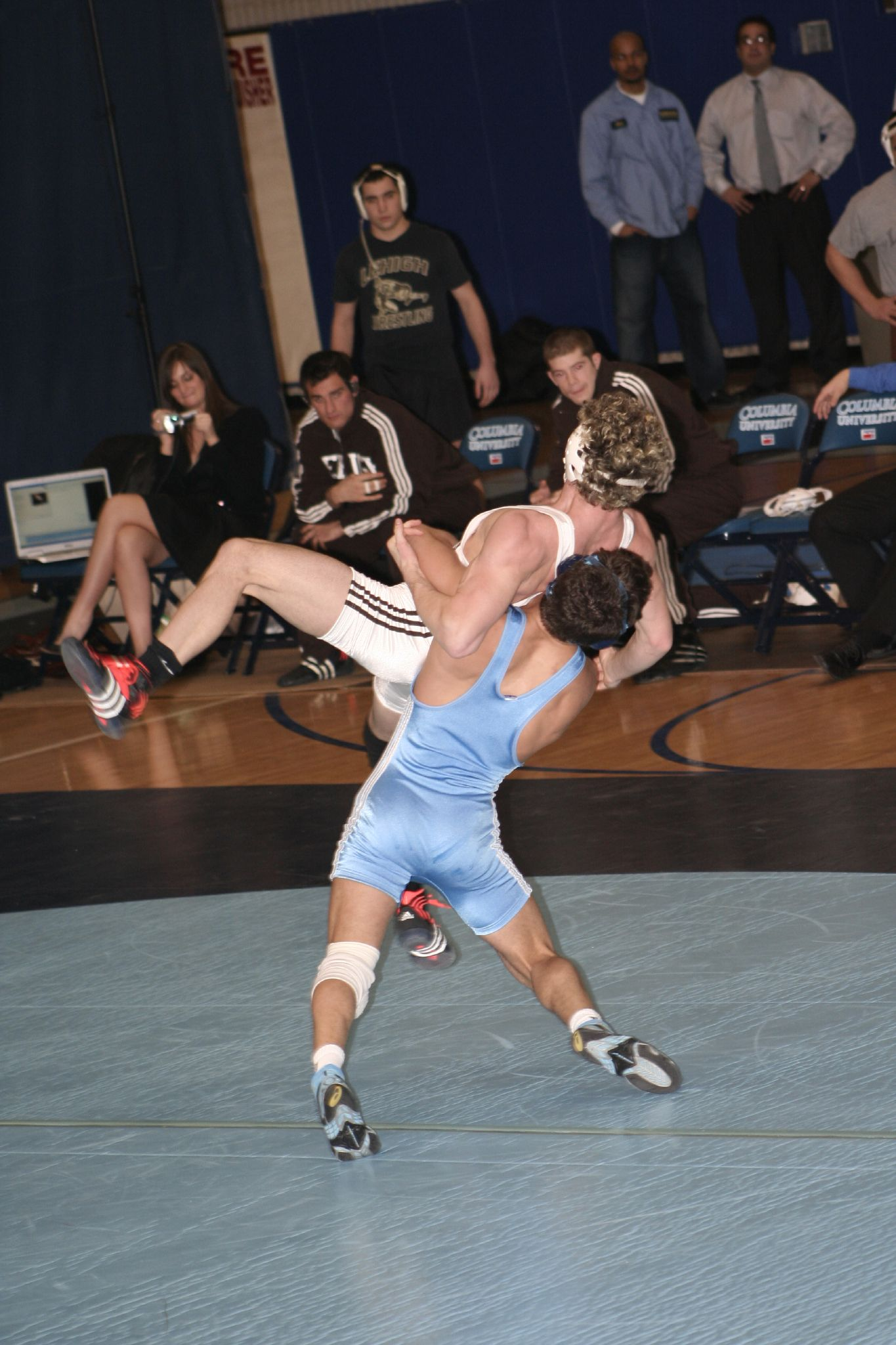
Throws can be performed in collegiate wrestling, but there is not as much emphasis placed on them from a points perspective as in the international styles.

Collegiate wrestling differs in a number of ways from freestyle and Greco-Roman.

There are some scoring differences. For example, in collegiate wrestling, "exposure" points are not given to a wrestler for simply forcing the opponent's shoulders to quickly rotate and be exposed to the mat. Instead, for example, a wrestler must control one of the opponent's shoulders on the mat and have the opponent's other shoulder forced to the mat at an angle of 45 degrees or less for two to five seconds to score. The points generated in this situation are called "near fall" points. This shows a difference in focus: while the international styles encourage explosive action and risk, collegiate wrestling encourages and rewards control over the opponent.

This emphasis on control was present in collegiate wrestling from its earliest days. Since 1915, collegiate wrestling officials have recorded the time that each participant had in controlling his opponent on the mat (known as "time advantage" or "riding time"). Early on, this was the major way to determine the winner in the absence of a fall. Over time, the significance of such timekeeping has declined, and now such "time advantage" only counts for one point in college competition at the most. As in both of the international styles, a wrestler can win the match by pinning both of their opponent's shoulders or both of their opponent's scapulae (shoulder blades) to the mat.

In collegiate wrestling, there is an additional position to commence wrestling after the first period, and also to resume wrestling after various other situations. All three styles begin a match with both wrestlers facing each other on their feet; known as the neutral position with the opportunity given to both to score a takedown and thus gain control over the opponent. In collegiate wrestling, once a takedown is scored, the wrestler under control in the inferior (defensive or bottom) position remains there until they escape the move, until they reverse the position, until the period ends, or until various penalty situations occur. The inferior position is one possible choice for a starting position in the second and third periods, known as the referee's position. The referee's position is roughly analogous to the "par terre" starting position in the international wrestling styles. In the international styles, the "par terre" starting position is not utilized as often as the referee's position is in collegiate wrestling. In the two international styles, the inferior position in the "par terre" starting position is now used to penalize a wrestler who has committed an illegal act.

In collegiate wrestling, there is a de-emphasis on throws, or maneuvers where the other wrestler is taken off their feet, taken through the air, and lands on their back or shoulders. This lack of emphasis on throws is another example of how collegiate wrestling emphasizes dominance or control, as opposed to the element of risk and explosive action. A legal throw in collegiate wrestling is awarded the same number of points as any other takedown. In freestyle and Greco-Roman wrestling, points awarded for a wrestler's takedowns increase with the level of explosiveness seen in the throws. Well-executed throws can even win a period in the international styles, especially when a throw is of grand amplitude (a throw in which a wrestler takes an opponent off of the mat and controls their opponent so that their feet go directly above their head). In collegiate wrestling, some of the throws seen in the international styles may even be illegal, such as a full-back suplex from a rear standing position. However, many collegiate wrestlers still incorporate some throws into their repertoire of moves because a thrown opponent often lands on their back or shoulders and thus in a position more conducive to producing near-fall points or securing a fall.

Generally, rather than lifting the opponent or throwing them for grand amplitude in order to win the period as in the international styles, the collegiate wrestler most often seeks to take their opponent down to the mat and perform a "breakdown" (that is, to get their opponent in the defensive position flat on their stomach or side). With the opponent off their base of support (that is, off their hands and knees), the collegiate wrestler in the offensive position would then seek to run pinning combinations, or combinations of techniques designed to secure a fall. Failing to gain a fall could still result in an advantage in riding time and potential near-fall points.

The defensive wrestler could counter such attempts for a takedown, or when once taken down try to escape their opponent's control or reverse control altogether. In a last-ditch attempt to foil a fall, the defensive wrestler could also "bridge" out of their opponent's control (that is, pry their head, their back, and both of their feet up from the mat and then turn toward their stomach). Overall, a collegiate wrestler in their techniques would most likely emphasize physical control and dominance over the opponent on the mat.

== History ==
=== American wrestling in the early colonial era ===
There were already wrestling styles among Native Americans varying from tribe and nation by the 15th and 16th centuries, when the first Europeans settled. The English and French who settled on the North American continent sought out wrestling as a popular pastime. Soon, there were local champions in every settlement, with contests between them on a regional level. The colonists in what would become the United States started out with something more akin to Greco-Roman wrestling, but soon found that style too restrictive in favor of a style with a greater allowance of holds.

The Irish were known for their "collar-and-elbow" style, a variant of jacket wrestling (which was popular across Europe), in which wrestlers at the start of the match would grasp each other by the collar with one hand and by the elbow with the other. From this position, wrestlers sought to achieve a fall. If no fall occurred, the wrestlers would continue grappling both standing on their feet and on the ground until a fall was made. Irish immigrants later brought this style to the United States where it soon became widespread.

The Cornish were well known for their style of wrestling (another variant of jacket wrestling), Cornish wrestling, and this style became very popular in the US, Australia, New Zealand, Britain and South Africa. Many world champions came from the US, such as Jack Carkeek.

Other British wrestling included the backhold styles (Cumberland Wrestling and Scottish Backhold) and what became known as catch-as-catch can wrestling, which had a particular following in Great Britain and the variant developed in Lancashire had a particular effect on future freestyle wrestling.

=== 18th and 19th century United States ===
By the 18th century, wrestling soon became recognized as a legitimate spectator sport, despite its roughness. Among those who were well known for their wrestling techniques were several U.S. presidents. Since catch-as-catch can wrestling was very similar, it gained great popularity in fairs and festivals in the United States during the 19th century. The collar-and-elbow style was also refined by later Irish immigrants, and gained great ground because of the success of George William Flagg from Vermont, the wrestling champion of the Army of the Potomac. After the Civil War, freestyle wrestling began to emerge as a distinct sport, and soon spread rapidly in the United States. Professional wrestling also emerged in the late 19th century (not like the sports-entertainment seen today). By the 1880s, American wrestling became organized, with matches often being conducted alongside gymnastics meets and boxing tournaments in athletic clubs. The growth of cities, industrialization, and the closing of the American frontier provided the necessary avenue for sports such as wrestling to increase in popularity.

=== 20th century ===
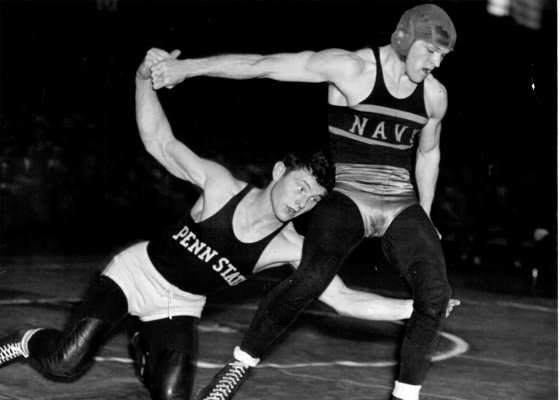
A Navy vs Penn State wrestling match in 1949

In 1903, the first intercollegiate dual meet took place between Yale and Columbia University.

Two years later, in 1905, the Eastern Intercollegiate Wrestling Association held its first tournament, which sparked many more wrestling tournaments at both the collegiate and high school levels.

Edward C. Gallagher, a football and track and field athlete at Oklahoma A&M College (now Oklahoma State University), launched wrestling as an official university sport just before World War I and with his team launched a dynasty, with undefeated matches from 1921 to 1931. In 1928, the first NCAA Wrestling Championships took place on March 30 to 31 on the campus of Iowa State College.

The rules of collegiate wrestling marked a sharp contrast to the freestyle wrestling rules of the International Amateur Wrestling Federation (IAWF). From then on, collegiate wrestling emerged as a distinctly American sport. College and high school wrestling grew especially after the standardization of the NCAA wrestling rules, which applied early on to both collegiate and scholastic wrestling (with high school modifications). More colleges, universities, and junior colleges began offering dual meets and tournaments, including championships and having organized wrestling seasons. There were breaks in wrestling seasons because of World War I and World War II, but in the high schools especially, state association wrestling championships sprung up in different regions throughout the 1930s and 1940s. As amateur wrestling grew after World War II, various collegiate athletic conferences also increased the number and quality of their wrestling competition, with more wrestlers making the progression of wrestling in high school, being recruited by college coaches, and then entering collegiate competition.

For most of the 20th century, collegiate wrestling was the most popular form of amateur wrestling in the United States, especially in the Midwest and the Southwest regions. The 1960s and 1970s saw major developments in collegiate wrestling, with the emergence of the United States Wrestling Federation (USWF) (now known as USA Wrestling). The USWF, with its membership of coaches, educators, and officials, became recognized eventually as the official governing body of American wrestling and as the official representative to the United States Olympic Committee, in place of the Amateur Athletic Union.

Simon Fraser University in British Columbia, Canada has competed in NAIA wrestling since 1977, consistently producing individual champions, All-American awards, and winning the team title twice (in 1988 and 1993). In 2009, SFU became the first non-American NCAA member school, with their wrestling program participating in U Sports for Olympic styles and NAIA for collegiate.

Collegiate wrestling teams compete in the NCAA national wrestling championships every year in each of the three divisions. The NAIA, NJCAA, and NCWA hold annual national wrestling championships as well. National Champion and All-American individual honors are awarded at the national championships in each of the 10 college weight classes, as well as a team title.

== Weight classes ==
The National Collegiate Athletic Association (NCAA) is the organization that regulates collegiate wrestling. The wrestling rules developed by the NCAA are followed by each of the NCAA's three divisions. In addition, the National Association of Intercollegiate Athletics (NAIA), the National Junior College Athletic Association (NJCAA), and the National Collegiate Wrestling Association (NCWA) have also adopted them, with some modifications. The NCAA generally sets the standard for weight classes for college-level dual meets, multiple duals, and tournaments. There are 10 main weight classes currently open to college-level competition, ranging from 125 lb (56.7 kg) to the Heavyweight division that ranges from 183 lb to 285 lb (83-129 kg). There is also the 235 lb weight class, which only the National Collegiate Wrestling Association, the organization that governs college wrestling for institutions outside the NCAA, NAIA, and NJCAA, currently allows that ranges from 174 lb to 235 lb (79-106.5 kg). The NCWA also allows eight weight classes for women ranging from 105 lb to 200 lb (47.6-90.7 kg). A wrestler must normally have their weight assessed by a member of the institution's athletics medical staff (e.g. a physician, certified athletic trainer, or registered dietician) before the first official team practice. The weight assessed is then their minimum weight class. The athletics medical staff member and the head coach then review all of the assessed weights of the wrestling team members and certify them online at the website of the National Wrestling Coaches Association (NWCA). After the certification, the wrestler may not compete below that weight class and may only compete at one weight class higher than their minimum weight.

If a wrestler does gain weight over their certified weight class and wrestles at two weight classes above it, they forfeit their previous lowest weight class for the one weight class below where they wrestled. If a contestant wishes to weigh-in and wrestle at only one weight class above their certified weight class and later return to their lowest certified weight class, they may do so. However, the wrestler may only return to that certified weight class according to the weight-loss plan of the National Wrestling Coaches Association. This weight loss plan takes into account potential dehydration during the wrestling season and minimum amounts of body fat.

All of this has been done in order to protect the wrestlers' health and safety.

== Season structure ==
The collegiate wrestling season customarily runs from October or November to March. Regular season competition begins in late October or early November and continues until February. Post-season competition usually continues from February to March (depending on, if individual wrestlers or teams qualify for a conference, regional, or national championship). Normally, wrestling teams from two different colleges or universities would compete in what is known as a dual meet. It is possible for there also to be a multiple dual, where more than two wrestling teams compete against each other at the same event on the same day. For example, one college wrestling team may face another wrestling team for the first dual, and then a third wrestling team for the second dual. Also, those two wrestling teams may compete against each other in a dual meet as well. Colleges and universities often compete within their particular athletic conference; though competition outside a team's conference or even outside its division within the NCAA is not uncommon.

=== Dual meets ===
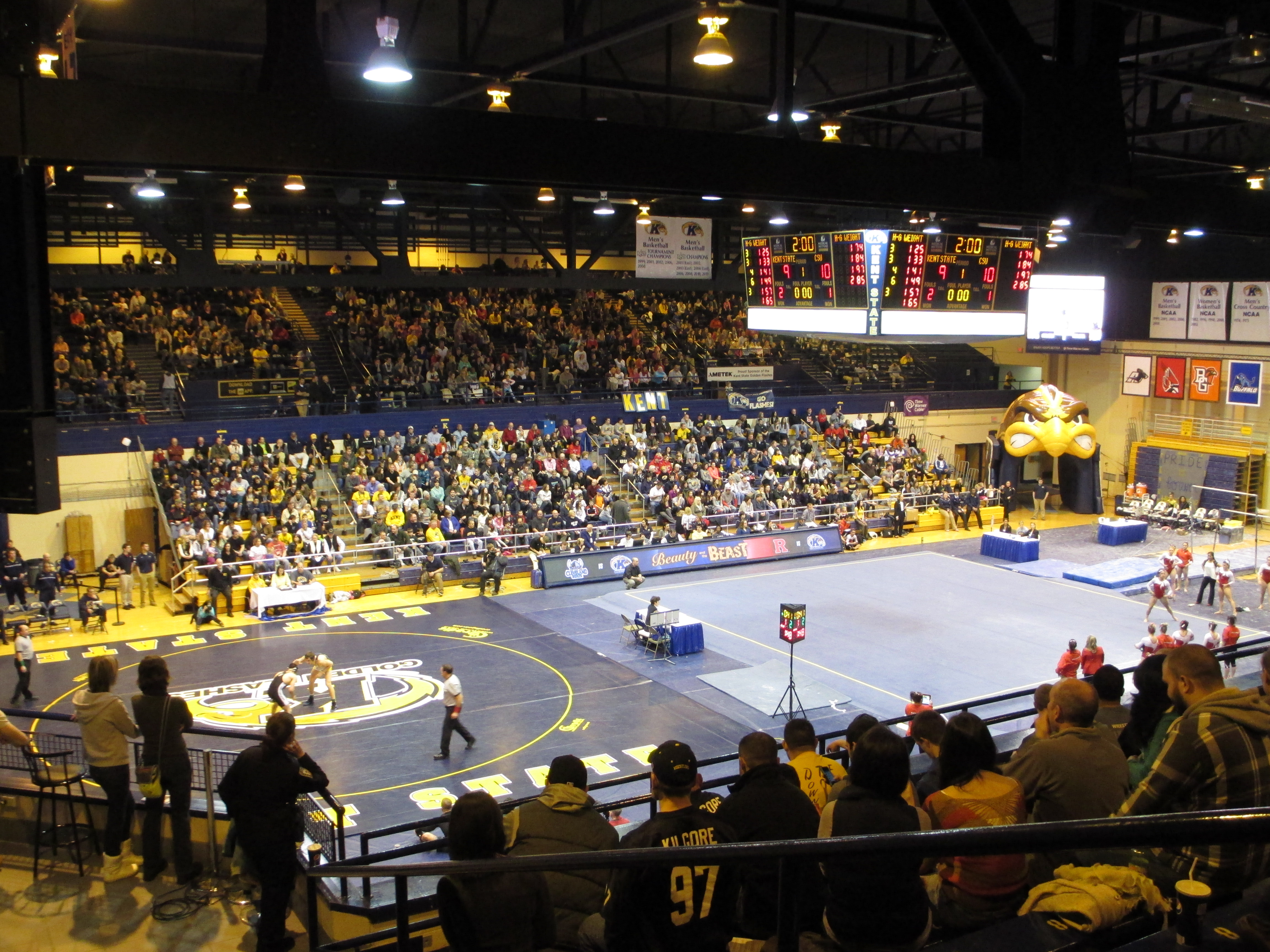
The layout of a collegiate wrestling dual meet taking place alongside a collegiate gymnastics meet

Dual meets usually take place on evenings during the school week (Monday through Friday); on Saturday mornings, afternoons, or evenings; or even on Sunday mornings or afternoons during the wrestling season and begin with weigh-ins at a maximum of one hour before the meet begins. No weight allowances are made for dual meets and multiple-day dual meets. Wrestlers are also examined by a physician or a certified athletic trainer for any communicable skin diseases. If a student-wrestler does not make weight, they are ineligible for that weight class and a forfeit is scored. If there are any communicable skin diseases, it is a ground for disqualification. The wrestler's coach or athletic trainer can provide written documentation from a physician that a skin infection of a wrestler is not communicable. The final judgement for whether a wrestler would be allowed to compete lies with the meet physician or athletic trainer on site.

In all cases, after determining the sequence of weight classes for the dual meet, the referee will call the wrestlers from each team who have been designated as captains. One of the visiting captains will call a disk toss. The colored disk will then fall to the floor and determine which team has the choice of position at the start of the second period and which one of the team's members is to appear first on the mat when called by the referee for each weight class. The wrestler-captain who won the disk toss may choose the even or odd weight classes. That is, they may choose the weight classes, from lowest to highest, that are numbered evenly or oddly. For example, the 125 lb (56.6 kg), 141 lb (64 kg), 157 lb (71.2 kg), etc. weight classes would be odd, and the 133 lb (60.3 kg), 149 lb (67.5 kg), 165 lb (74.8 kg), etc. weight classes would be even. This order would work in the traditional sequence until the last even weight class of 285 lb (129.2 kg).

During a dual meet, the top varsity wrestlers usually compete against each other. There can also be junior varsity matches, such as in Iowa, which are rare, that would take place immediately before the varsity matches. Also, before both varsity (and junior varsity) competition, there can also be an exhibition match in one or more weight classes. The exhibition matches do not count towards the varsity (or junior varsity) team score, but such matches allow wrestlers, especially at the freshman level, to gain more competitive experience. Wrestling matches usually proceed in each of the 10 weight classes. The order the matches occur in is determined after the weigh-ins either by a mutual decision of the coaches or by a random draw choosing a particular weight class to be featured first. In either case, the succeeding wrestling matches will follow in sequence. For example, if the 157 lb (71.2 kg) weight class competes first, the succeeding wrestling matches will follow until the heavyweight class. Then, beginning at 125 lb (56.6 kg), the rest of the matches will follow until the 149 lb (67.5 kg) match.

=== Tournaments ===
Often, many colleges and universities in the United States will compete with their teams in what is known as a tournament. In the tournament, 8, 16, 32, 64, 75, or more individual wrestlers/teams can compete in each bracket. This allows many schools to establish their rankings, not only for individual student-wrestlers, but also for college and university wrestling teams as a whole, such as a conference or regional championship, or the NCAA Division I Wrestling Championships. A tournament committee usually administers the event and after individual and team entries have been verified, the officials then determine the order of the matches, called "drawing", by certain brackets, such as brackets of 8 or 16. When doing this, the tournament officials doing the drawing take into account each wrestler's win–loss record, previous tournament placements, and other factors that indicate the wrestler's ability. With that in mind, wrestlers who are noticed as having the most superior records are bracketed so that two top-ranked superior wrestlers in each weight class do not compete against each other in an early round. This is called seeding.

Tournaments are often sponsored by a college or university and are usually held on Friday, Saturday, Sunday, or over any of two days within the weekend. Admission is often charged to cover costs and make a small profit for the host. A tournament begins with weigh-ins starting two hours or less before competition begins on the first day or one hour or less before competitions begins on any subsequent day. An allowance of one pound (0.45 kg) is granted for each subsequent day of the tournament. With the drawing and weigh-ins completed, wrestlers then compete in two brackets in each of the 10 weight classes. If there are not enough wrestlers to fill up the bracket in a weight class, a bye will be awarded to a wrestler who does not have to compete against another wrestler in his pairing. After taking account of the number of byes, the first round in each weight class then begins. Most college wrestling tournaments are in double elimination format. The last two wrestlers in the upper (championship) bracket wrestle for first place in the finals, with the loser winning second place. A wrestler cannot place higher than third if they are knocked down to the lower (wrestle-back) bracket by losing in the championship semi-finals. This is largely the result of time constraints: one-day tournaments often last into the evening.

If the winner of the wrestle-back bracket were allowed to challenge the winner of the championship bracket in the championship, the tournament could continue well past midnight before finishing.

After the first match of the round of 16 in a championship bracket in each weight class, the wrestle-back rounds would then commence, beginning among all of the wrestlers who lost to the winners of the round of 16. The winner of the wrestle-back finals would then win third place, with the loser winning fourth place. In tournaments where six places are awarded, the losers of the wrestle-back semi-finals would wrestle for fifth place, with the loser winning sixth place. If eight places are awarded, the losers of the wrestle-back quarterfinals would wrestle for seventh place, with the loser winning eighth place, and so on. After the championships finals, the awards ceremony usually takes place with plaques, medals, trophies, or other awards given to the individual and team winners with the highest placements. Precise rules for tournaments may vary from one event to the next.

Each intercollegiate athletic conference or geographic area features two or three "elite" tournaments every year. These events are by invitation only. Hence the commonly used name for them, invitationals. Tournament sponsors (which are usually colleges and universities, but sometimes other organizations) invite the best varsity wrestlers from their area to compete against each other. Many elite tournaments last two or even three days. For this reason, elite tournaments are often scheduled during the college's or university's winter break.

Between one season and the next, post-season tournaments and preseason tournaments are often held in collegiate wrestling and also in freestyle and Greco-Roman. The most active wrestlers often take part in those to sharpen their skills and techniques. Also, clinics and camps are often held for both wrestlers and their coaches to help refresh old techniques and gain new strategies. College wrestlers often serve as referees, volunteer coaches, assistants, or as counselors during many of the camps, clinics, and tournaments held during the off-season.

== Layout of the mat ==
The match takes place on a thick rubber mat that is shock-absorbing to ensure safety. A large outer circle between 32 and 42 feet (9.75-12.8 m) in diameter that designates the wrestling area is marked on the mat. The circumference line of that circle is called the boundary line. The wrestling area is surrounded by a mat area or apron (or protection area) that is at least five inches (12.7 cm) in width that helps prevent serious injury. The mat area is designated by the use of contrasting colors or a 2-inch-wide (51 mm) line, which is part of the wrestling area and included in bounds. The wrestlers are within bounds when any part of either wrestler is on or inside this boundary line.

The mat can be no thicker than four inches (10 cm) nor thinner than a mat with the shock-absorbing qualities of a 2-inch-thick (51 mm) hair-felt mat. Inside the outer circle is usually an inner circle about 10 feet (3 m) in diameter, designated by the use of contrasting colors or a 2-inch-wide (51 mm) line, although this is no longer specified by the NCAA Wrestling Rules and Interpretations. Wrestlers are encouraged to stay near the center of the mat within the inner circle, or else they risk being penalized for stalling (that is, deliberately attempting to slow down the action of the match or backing away from the opponent so they cannot score). Each wrestler begins action at one of two one-inch (2.54 cm) starting lines inside the inner circle that is three feet long. Two one-inch lines close the ends of the starting lines and are marked red for the wrestler from the visiting team and green for the wrestler from the home team. The two starting lines are 10 inches (25.4 cm) apart from each other and form a rectangle in the middle of the wrestling area. This rectangle designates the starting positions for the three periods. Additional padding may be added under the mat to protect the wrestlers, especially if the wrestlers are competing on a concrete floor. All mats that are in sections are secured together.

== Equipment ==
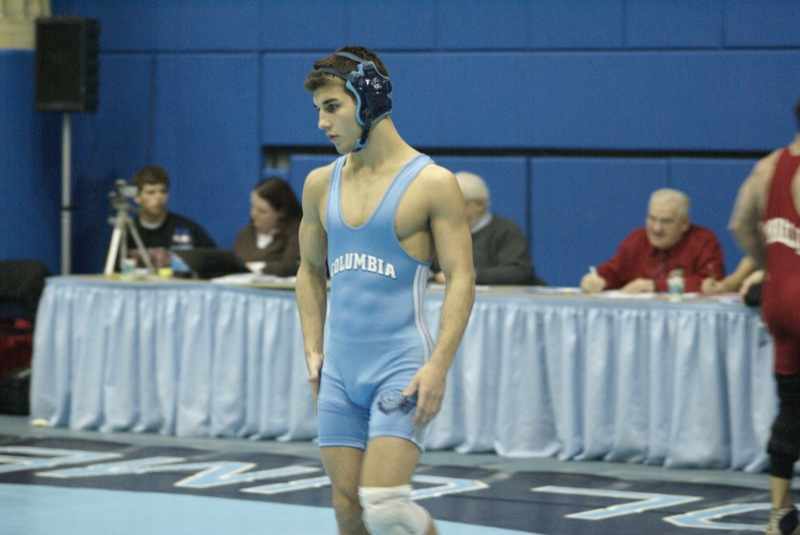
A Columbia University collegiate wrestler before start of match; in college wrestling, rules mandate wearing headgear during matches.

- A singlet is a one-piece wrestling garment that should provide a tight and comfortable fit for the wrestler. It is made from nylon or spandex and prevents an opponent from using anything on the wrestler as leverage. The singlets are usually light or dark depending on whether the wrestlers are competing at home or abroad, and they are usually designed according to the institution's or club's team colors. Wrestlers also have the option of wearing leggings with their singlets. Recently, some college wrestlers have begun to wear short-sleeved, tight-fitting shirts with accompanying shorts made out of spandex.
- A special pair of wrestling shoes is worn by a wrestler to increase their mobility and flexibility. Wrestling shoes are light and flexible in order to provide maximum comfort and movement. Usually made with rubber soles, they help give the wrestler's feet a better grip on the mat.
- Wrestling headgear, equipment worn around the ears to protect them, is mandatory in collegiate wrestling. Headgear is worn to decrease the participant's own risk for injury, as there is the potential to develop cauliflower ear.
- In addition, special equipment, such as face masks, braces, mouthguards, hair coverings, knee pads, or elbow pads may be worn by either wrestler. Anything worn that prevents normal movement or execution of holds is prohibited.

== Injuries and infections ==
Injuries and infections are not uncommon in the sport of wrestling since contact is frequent. Also, infections occur frequently due to body secretions (sweat, saliva, and blood).

Concussions

Common ways of getting concussions are any head-to-head hits or any hits that involve a hard blow to the skull. Every year, nearly 135,000 children ranging from age 5 to 18 are treated for concussions and other head injures in the United States from sports or other recreational activities. Many concussions come from sports such as wrestling, football, boxing and any other sport whose players risk getting hit in the head. Wearing headgear can help prevent concussions. Also, wearing a frontal pad that protects the forehead and top of the head is very effective in protecting the head from a hit that may cause a concussion. Wearing a mouth piece can help prevent concussions as well.

Cauliflower ear

Cauliflower ear is a blood clot that forms under the skin in the ear, causing the appearance of a large bump in the ear; the bump tends to be extremely hard. To develop cauliflower ear one must be hit in the ear many times or hit hard for it to form into a blood clot. When having cauliflower ear it is important to get the ear drained of fluid that has built up, otherwise it will harden. Once the cauliflower ear has hardened, the ear will require surgery to return to normal shape and size. The best way to prevent cauliflower ear is to wear protective headgear.

Ligament injuries

Knee ligament injuries are a common injury in wrestling. One common injury occurs to the medial collateral ligament which is located on the inner side of the knee. Another common injury to the knee is on the outside lateral collateral ligament. Leg or knee injuries are commonly caused by overtwisting the leg outward from the middle of the body.

Sprains and strains

Ankle sprains and wrist sprains are common in wrestling. Ankle sprains typically occur from twisting the ankle and injuring the ligaments within the ankle. Wrist sprains occur from falling hard on the wrist and damaging the ligaments in the wrist.

Prepatellar bursitis

Prepatellar bursitis is caused by the inflammation of the prepatellar bursa in the front of the patella (knee cap), which swells up and can be painful. Preventing this can be done by wearing a knee pad to help reduce impact on the knee.

Overtraining syndrome

Overtraining syndrome is caused by overexerting. Symptoms include fatigue, lack of motivation, losing body mass, decreased performance, depression, insomnia and immune system weakening. This can affect the athlete mentally as well as physically.

Skin diseases

Taking showers regularly, wearing clean clothes for practice, and mopping the mats with an antiseptic solution will help prevent spread and growth of diseases.

Impetigo

Impetigo is a highly contagious skin infection. It appears as red or yellowish bumps and sores that are clustered together which may increase in size. The sores can burst which then crust over with a yellowish or brownish scab. This infection can be spread by coming into contact with a person who has the infection. Another way to contract impetigo is by touching or using equipment or mats that are infected by the bacteria. If impetigo is left untreated, other infections could occur which can cause serious health issues. The bumps cause no pain although they may be itchy. Once the blisters pop, they crust over with a yellow brownish scab but they can still be red and itchy. The Mayo Clinic states that "Classic signs and symptoms of impetigo involve red sores that quickly rupture, ooze for a few days and then form a yellowish-brown crust. The sores usually occur around the nose and mouth but can be spread to other areas of the body by fingers, clothing and towels". Impetigo is caused by Staphylococcus aureus bacteria.

- Certain sports. Participating in sports like wrestling and football where skin-to-skin contact is always happening may increase the risk of developing a skin infection.

MRSA

MRSA is a bacterium that has a resistance to certain antibiotics. MRSA stands for methicillin-resistant Staphylococcus aureus. Any athlete who develops a skin infection should be checked by doctor immediately. Also, one should resist trying to give themselves care. When treating MRSA abscesses, medical professionals tend to make an incision and drain the infected area. MRSA can become life-threatening if it reaches the blood stream or causes pneumonia; it also can cause infections on surgical sites that can cause major complications.

Dermatophytosis

Dermatophytosis, commonly known as ringworm or tinea, is a fungal or yeast infection on the skin in the shape of a circle. It appears to be red and the outer ring may be slightly raised. The infection grows while in warm and moist places and tends to be itchy. One can contract the infection by touching the area that is infected or items that are contaminated.

Herpetic lesions

These lesions are caused by herpes simplex, herpes zoster, and herpes gladiatorum; all are types of herpes that are common in skin-to-skin contact sports. Genital herpes is spread through sexual contact. These lesions come from skin-to-skin contact or body secretions. The skin starts to develop blisters which can happen anywhere on the body. To return to any activity one must be cleared by a doctor. Herpes simplex virus is the virus that causes cold sores; this virus can be spread by oral secretions and can also cause herpes gladiatorum. Once a person becomes infected, the virus stays in the body indefinitely and can reactivate itself anytime causing cold sores. This form of herpes is on the skin and can be spread through contact with others or sharing beverages with someone who is infected or using anything that they may have contaminated. Varicella zoster virus is the virus which causes shingles and chicken pox. Once one has had the chicken pox they carry the virus indefinitely. The virus stays inactive but if it becomes active again, it causes shingles.

== The match ==
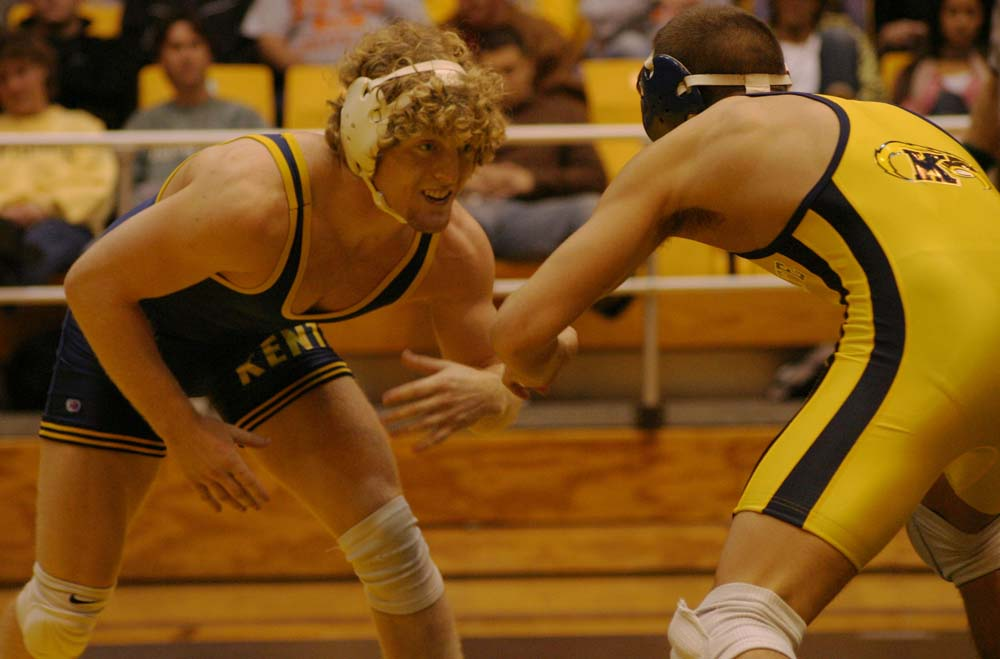
At the start of the first period (the referee flips a coin in the second period, and the winner may choose between the 3 positions), the two wrestlers start in the neutral (standing) position, as shown.

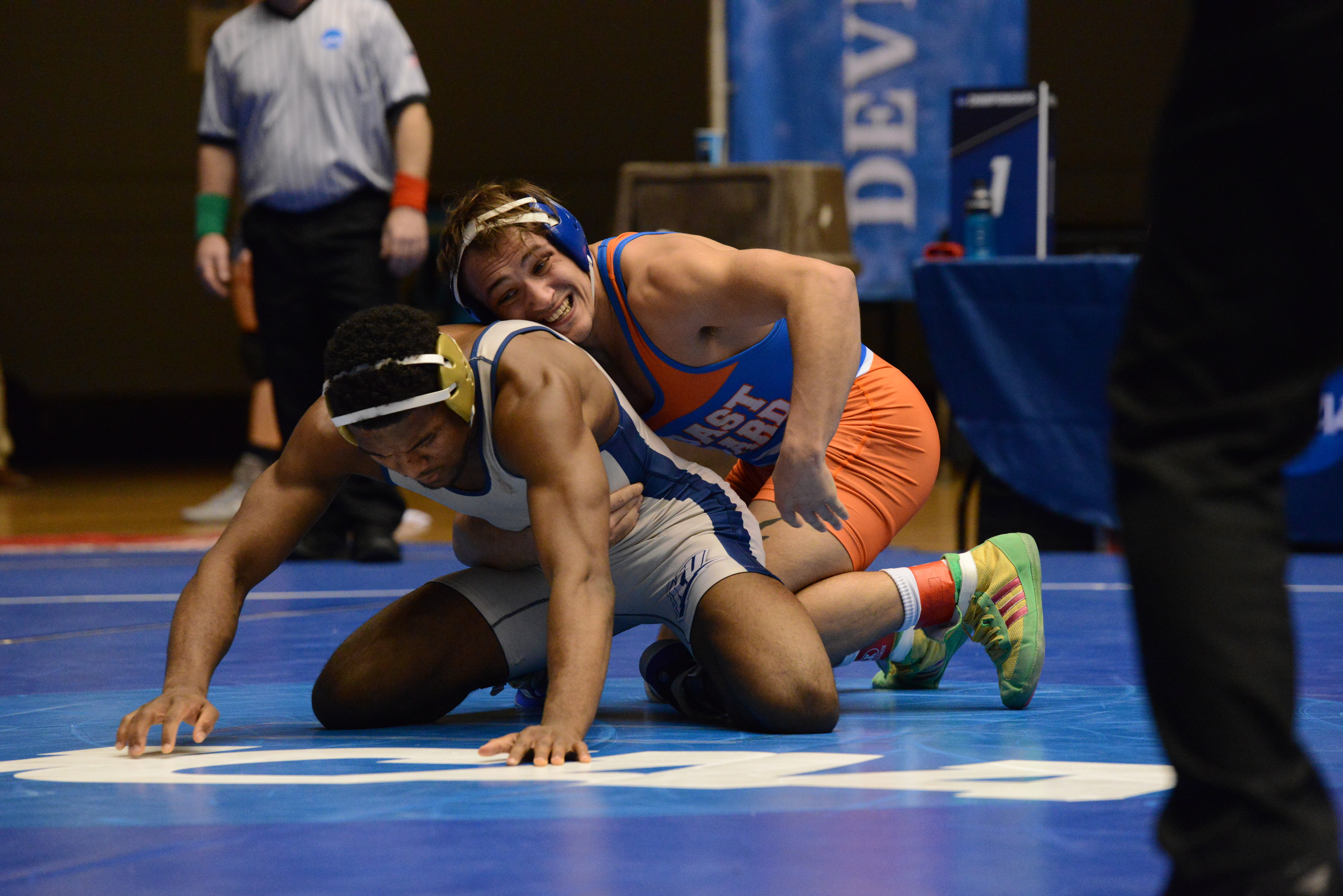
Usually at the start of the second and third periods, both wrestlers start in the "referee's position", a term for top and bottom wrestling. The wrestler in bottom position starts with hands spread out above top starting line and knees behind back starting line. The wrestler in top position starts with one hand on the abdomen and the other on the opponent's elbow.

A match is a competition between two individual wrestlers of the same weight class. The match consists of three periods totaling seven minutes in college matches (with an overtime round if necessary if the score is tied at the end of regulation).

The main official at the wrestling match is the referee, who is in full control in matters of judgement at the competition and is responsible for starting and stopping the match; observing all holds; signaling points; calling penalties such as illegal holds, unnecessary roughness, fleeing the mat, or flagrant misconduct; and finally observing a full view of and determining the fall. There can also be one assistant referee (especially at tournaments) that helps the referee with making any difficult decisions and in preventing error. Also, scorers are there to record the points of the two individual wrestlers. Finally, a match or meet timekeeper with assistant timekeepers are present to note the match time, timeouts, and time advantage and work with the scorers.

=== Period format ===
- Pre-match

Each wrestler is called by the referee, steps onto the mat, and may put on a green (for the home team) or red (for the visiting team) anklet about three inches (7.62 cm) wide, which the referee will use to indicate scoring. The referee then prepares the wrestlers to begin the first period.

- First period

The referee prepares both wrestlers for the first period by making sure each wrestler is correctly in the neutral position. The first period lasts 3 minutes long. This is the longest period of the match. The neutral position has the two wrestlers standing opposite each other on their feet. Each wrestler starts with his lead foot on the green or red area of the starting lines, and his other foot even with or behind the lead foot. Both wrestlers then usually slightly crouch with their arms in front of them at or above waist level. In this position, neither wrestler is in control. When the referee is certain that both wrestlers are correctly in the neutral position, they blow the whistle to begin the first period (as well as whenever wrestling is resumed, such as at the beginning of the second and third periods, when contestants resume wrestling after going out of bounds, etc.). The match commences with each wrestler attempting to take down their opponent. The first period in college and university matches is three minutes long.

- Second period

The second and third period last 2 minutes each, where each wrestler will have their choice of position in each. If the match is not ended by a fall, technical fall, default, or disqualification, the referee then prepares both wrestlers to begin the second period. After the first period ends, one wrestler will have the choice of starting position in the second period. In dual meets, this is determined by the colored disk toss that took place before the meet began. In tournaments, the referee will toss a colored disk, with a green-colored side and a red-colored side, and the winner of that disk toss will have the choice of position. The wrestler could choose between the neutral position, or as is most commonly chosen to begin in the referee's position on the mat. The referee's position has both wrestlers beginning action at the center of the mat with one wrestler (in the defensive starting position) on the bottom with their hands spread apart in front of the forward starting line and their knees spread apart behind the rear starting line with their legs held together. The other wrestler on the top (in the offensive starting position) then kneels beside them with one arm wrapped around the bottom wrestler's waist (with the palm of their hand against the opponent's navel) and the other hand on or over the back of the opponent's near elbow for control. Most often, the wrestler with the choice chooses the defensive (bottom) position because of the relative ease of scoring an escape or reversal in comparison to a near-fall. The wrestler could also defer their choice to the beginning of the third period.

More recently, another starting position choice has been allowed, known as the optional offensive starting position or optional start. After the wrestler with the choice (the offensive wrestler) indicates their intention to the referee, the referee lets the defensive wrestler adjust and begin in the defensive starting position. Next, the offensive wrestler goes to either side of the defensive wrestler or behind them, with all their weight supported by both their feet or by one or both knees. The offensive wrestler would then place both of their hands on the opponent's back between the neck and the waist. When the referee starts the match by blowing the whistle, the defensive wrestler then has the opportunity to get back to their feet in a neutral position. Any of the starting positions may be used to resume action during a period when the wrestlers go off the mat, depending on the referee's judgment as to whether any or which wrestler had the position of advantage.

The second period is two minutes long.

- Third period

If the match is not ended by a fall, technical fall, default, or disqualification, the referee then prepares both wrestlers to begin the third period. The wrestler who did not choose the starting position for the second period now chooses the starting position. The third period is also two minutes long.

- First overtime round

- Sudden victory period

If the third period ends in a tie, a one-minute, sudden victory period occurs. Both wrestlers start in the neutral position. The first wrestler to score a takedown wins. Time advantage is not used in any sudden victory period.

- Tiebreaker periods

If no points are scored in the sudden victory period, or if the first points were scored simultaneously, two 30-second tiebreaker periods occur. Both wrestlers start in the referee's position. The wrestler who scored the first points (besides escapes and penalty points) in regulation has the choice of top or bottom position. If the only points scored in regulation were for escapes or penalties, the choice of position will be given to the winner of a colored disk toss. After the wrestler makes their choice, the two contestants then wrestle. Either of the two wrestlers must try to score as many points as they can. Once one 30-second period is over, the wrestler who was in the bottom position then wrestles on the top in another 30-second period. Whoever scores the most points (or is awarded a fall, default, or disqualification) wins the match. Time advantage is kept, and points are awarded accordingly.

- Second overtime round

If no wrestler has won by the end of the two tiebreaker periods, a second overtime round starts with a two-minute, sudden victory period, and then two 30-second tiebreaker periods for each wrestler. The wrestler who did not have the choice of position in the previous overtime round's first tiebreaker period now has the choice of position in this overtime round's first tiebreaker period. If the score remains tied after the end of the second overtime round, the wrestler who has one second or more of net time advantage from the two rounds of tiebreaker periods will be declared the winner.

- Subsequent overtime round(s)

If a winner still cannot be determined, overtime rounds that are structured like the second round of overtime take place until one wrestler scores enough points for the victory.

- Post-match

After the match is completed, regardless of the victory condition, the wrestlers will return to the center of the mat (on the 10-foot (3 m) inner circle) while the referee checks with the scorer's table. Upon the referee's return to the mat, the two wrestlers shake hands, and the referee proclaims the winner by raising the winner's hand. Both contestants then return to their team benches from the mat.

=== Match scoring ===
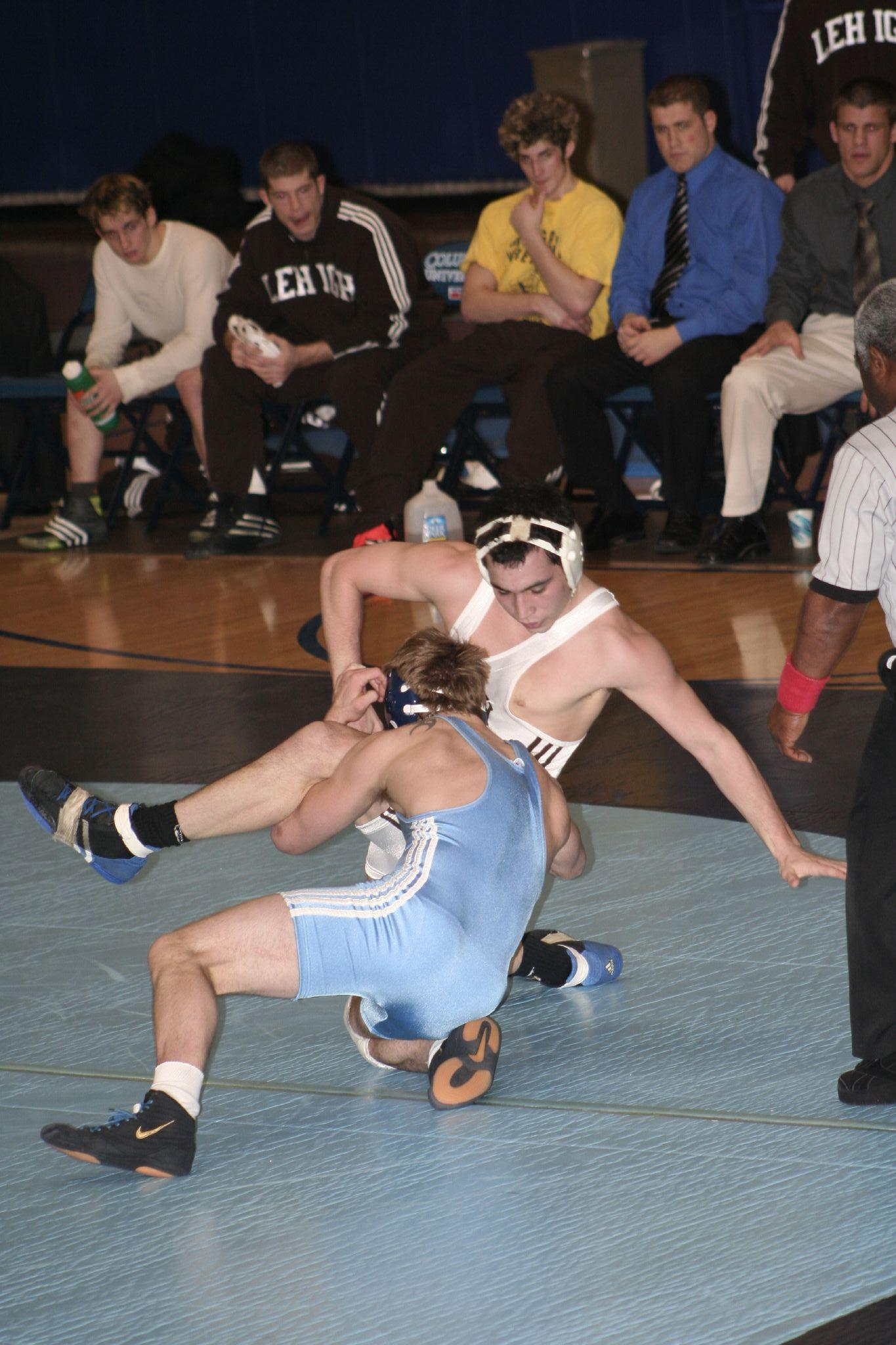
The college wrestler (in light blue) gets a takedown for three points; the points for the takedown will be given once the wrestler gets his opponent on the ground and has control of his opponent's hips.

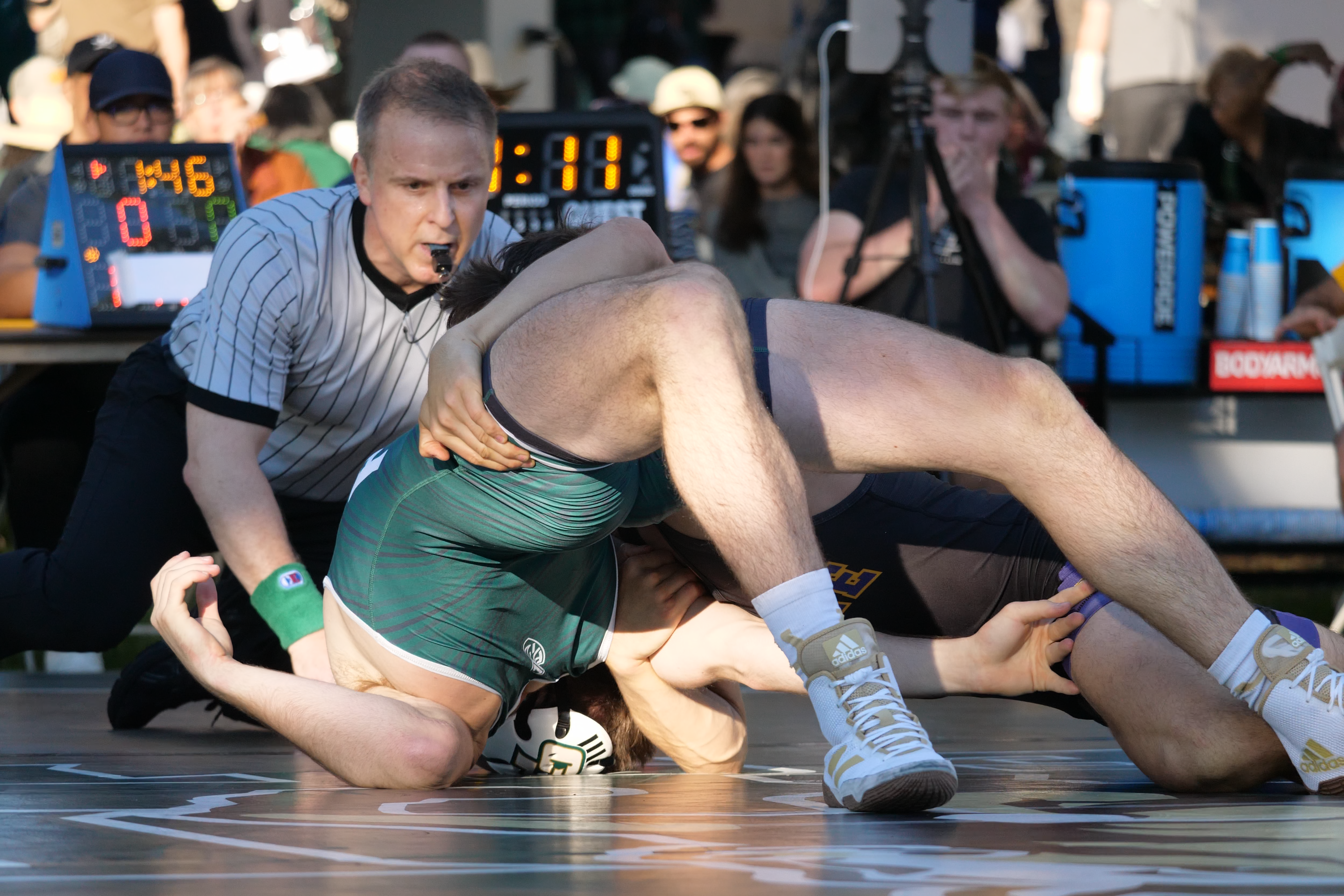
Near-fall points are scored when the defensive wrestler's shoulders are exposed to the mat, as shown.

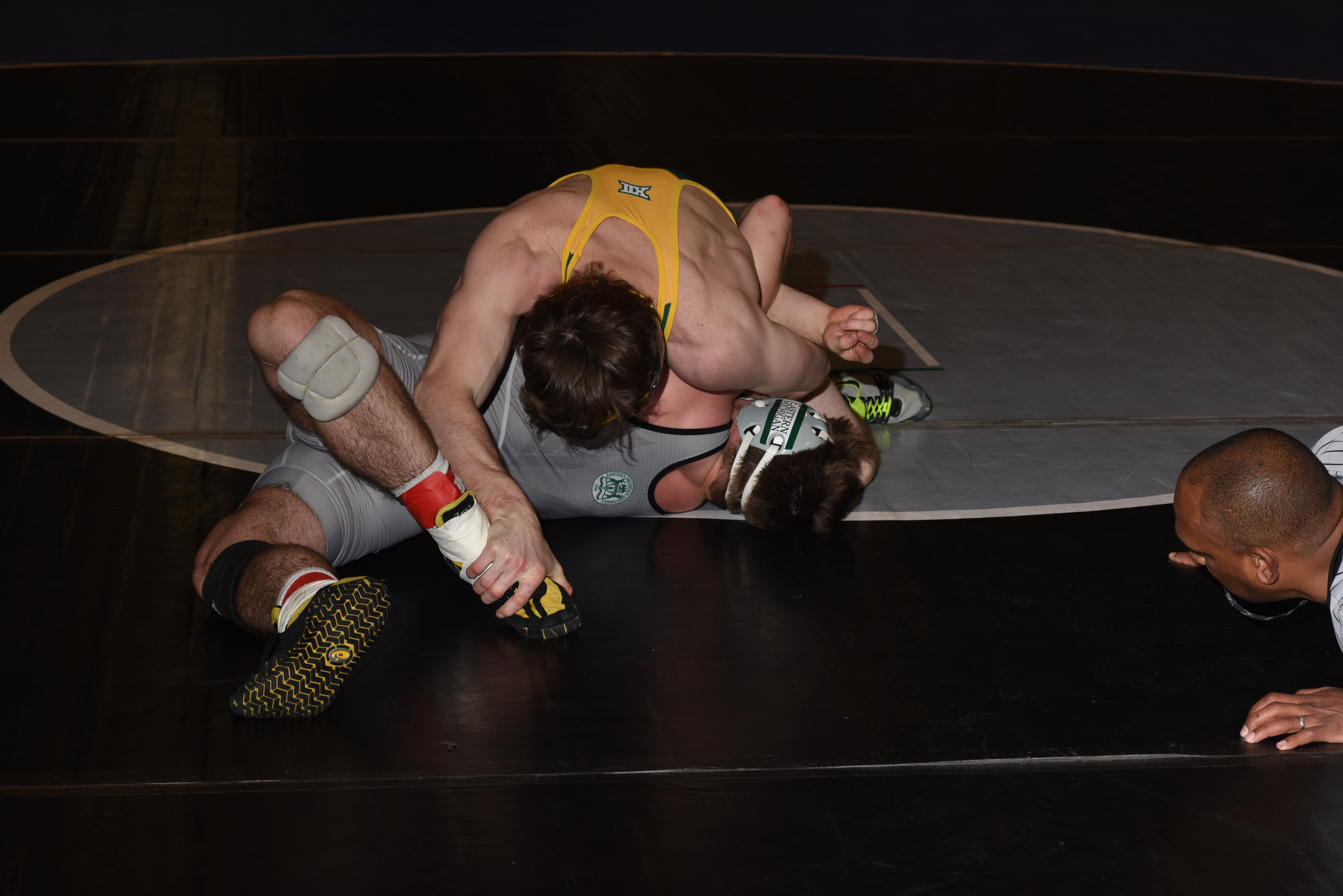
Near-fall points can be scored when the defensive wrestler is held with one shoulder on the mat and one shoulder at an angle of 45 degrees or less toward the mat, as shown.

In collegiate wrestling, points are awarded mostly on the basis of control. Control occurs when a wrestler has gained restraining power over an opponent, usually, by controlling the opponent's legs and torso. When a wrestler gains control and maintains restraining power over an opponent, they are said to be in a position of advantage. Scoring can be accomplished in the following ways:

- Takedown (3 points): A wrestler is awarded three points for a takedown when, from the neutral position, they gain control by taking the other wrestler down to the mat in-bounds and beyond reaction time. This is most often accomplished by attacking the legs of the opponent, although various throws can also be used to bring a wrestler down to the mat.
- Escape (1 point): A defensive wrestler being controlled on the bottom is awarded one point for an escape when the offensive wrestler loses control of the opponent while any part of either wrestler remains in bounds. An escape may be awarded when the wrestlers are still in contact.
- Reversal (2 points): A defensive wrestler who is being controlled on the bottom is awarded two points for a reversal when they come from the bottom/defensive position and gain control of the opponent either on the mat or in a rear standing position. Reversal points are awarded on the edge of the wrestling area if control is established while any part of either wrestler remains in bounds.
- Near-fall: Near-fall points are similar to the points awarded for exposure or the danger position in the international styles of wrestling, but the emphasis for near-falls is on control, not risk. Near-fall criteria are met when: (1) the offensive wrestler holds the defensive wrestler in a high bridge or on both elbows; (2) the offensive wrestler holds any part of both their opponent's shoulders or scapulae (shoulder blades) within 4 inches (10.16 cm) of the mat; or (3) the offensive wrestler controls the defensive wrestler in such a way that one of the bottom wrestler's shoulders or scapulae, or the head, is touching the mat, and the other shoulder or scapula is held at an angle of 45 degrees or less to the mat. The referee counts the seconds off. Only one near-fall is scored for a wrestler using the same pinning combination, regardless of the number of times the offensive wrestler places the defensive wrestler in a near fall position during the situation. Near-fall points are also known as "back points." Much of the criteria for the near-fall were used in a former scoring opportunity known as predicament in collegiate wrestling. When near fall points are given after the opponent is injured, signals an injury, or bleeds excessively, it is a consequence of what is sometimes referred to as the scream rule.

(2 points): Two points are given when near-fall criteria are met for two to three seconds. Two points can also be granted in cases where a pinning combination is executed legally and a near-fall is imminent, still, the defensive wrestler is injured, signals an injury, or bleeds excessively before the near-fall criterion is met.

(3 points): Three points are given when near fall criteria are met for three seconds. Three points can also be granted in cases where a pinning combination is executed legally and a near-fall is imminent, and the defensive wrestler is later injured, signals an injury, or bleeds excessively.
(4 points): Four points are given when the criteria for a near-fall are met for four seconds, or the defensive wrestler is later injured, indicates an injury, or bleeds excessively.

- Penalty (1 or 2 points): One or two points can be awarded by the referee to the opponent for various penalty situations. "Unsportsmanlike conduct" by the wrestler includes swearing, teasing the opponent, etc. "Unnecessary roughness" involves physical acts during the match that exceed normal aggressiveness. "Flagrant misconduct" includes actions (physical or nonphysical) that intentionally attack the opponent, the opponent's team, or others in a severe way. Illegal holds are also penalized accordingly, and potentially dangerous holds are not penalized, but the match will be stopped by the referee. Also, "technical violations" such as stalling, interlocking hands, and other minor infractions are penalized. With some situations, such as stalling or locking hands, a warning is given after the first occurrence, and if there is another occurrence the penalty point is given. In other situations, there is no warning and penalty points are automatically given. In general, after a certain number of occurrences where penalty points are given, the penalized wrestler is disqualified. A fuller treatment of the situations in which penalty points are awarded in college wrestling matches is found in the Penalty Table on pages WR-64 to WR-67 of the 2009 NCAA Wrestling Rules and Interpretations.
- Imminent scoring: When a match is stopped for an injury during a scoring situation (e.g. a takedown, reversal, or escape), and the referee determines that scoring would have been successful if the wrestling had continued, an injury timeout is charged to the injured wrestler and the applicable points are given to his non-injured opponent. This is also a consequence of the scream rule.
- Time advantage or riding time (1 point): Whenever a wrestler is controlling an opponent on the mat in such a way that prevents an escape or a reversal, they are gaining time advantage (or riding time). An assistant timekeeper then records the time advantage of each wrestler throughout the match. At the end of the third period, one point is awarded to the wrestler with the greater time advantage, provided that the difference of time advantage between the two wrestlers is one minute or more. Points for time advantage are awarded only in college competition.

== Victory conditions ==
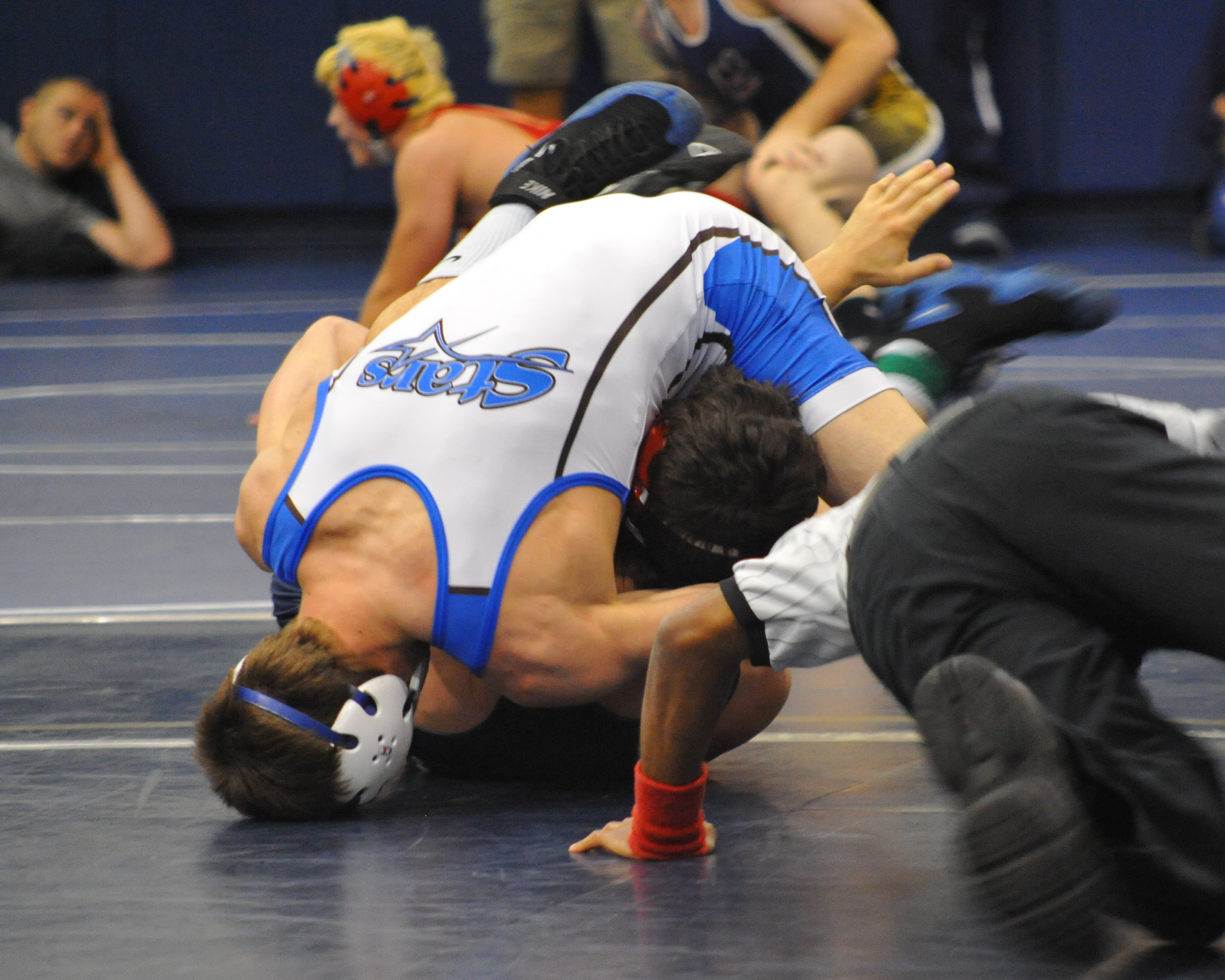
A fall, also known as a pin, occurs when any part of both shoulders or both scapula (shoulder blades) of the defensive wrestler is held in continuous contact with the mat for a specified amount of time (in collegiate wrestling for one second).

A match can be won in the following ways:

- Win by fall: The object of the entire wrestling match is to attain victory by what is known as the fall. A fall, also known as a pin, occurs when one wrestler holds any part of both of his opponent's shoulders or both of his opponent's scapulae (shoulder blades) in continuous contact with the mat for one second at the college level. The fall ends the match immediately, and the offensive wrestler who secured the fall is declared the winner. Falls (or pins) can be attained in many different ways. The most common way of securing the fall is through the various nelson holds, in particular, the half nelson. Other techniques used to secure falls are cradles, the headlock (head and arm), single or double armbars (bar arms), the "back bow" and the leg Turk, the reverse body lock, the guillotine, the leg split (also known as the banana split or spread eagle), the spladle, the figure-4 to the head, the straight body scissors, and the double grapevine (also called the Saturday night ride).
- Win by technical fall: If a fall is not secured to end the match, a wrestler can win a match simply by points. If a wrestler secures an advantage of 15 points over an opponent, the match ends immediately and the wrestler wins the match by technical fall. A technical fall is very likely when one wrestler has great control over the other wrestler and is able to score near fall points repeatedly. If the 15-point advantage is gained while the offensive wrestler has their opponent in a pinning situation, the match would continue to allow the offensive wrestler to secure the fall. If the offensive wrestler is unable to secure a fall, the match ends once a near-fall situation is no longer seen by the referee or when the wrestlers return to the neutral position.
- Win by major decision: If no fall or technical fall occurs, a wrestler can also win simply by points. If the match concludes, and a wrestler has a margin of victory of eight or more points over an opponent, but under the 15 points needed for a technical fall, the win is known as a major decision. In team duals, a major decision will give a team four team points.
- Win by decision: If the match concludes, and a wrestler has a margin of victory of less than eight points over an opponent, or wins the first point in a sudden victory period in overtime without gaining a fall, default, or a win by an opponent's disqualification, the wrestler then wins by decision.
- Win by default: If, for any reason, a wrestler is unable to continue competing during the match (e.g. because of injury, illness, etc.), their opponent is awarded victory by default. A wrestler can concede a win by default to their opponent by informing the referee themselves of their inability to continue wrestling. The decision to concede the win by default can also be made by the wrestler's coach.
- Win by disqualification: If a wrestler is banned from participating further in a match by virtue of acquiring penalties or for flagrant misconduct, their opponent wins by disqualification.
- Win by forfeit: A wrestler also may gain a victory by forfeit when the other wrestler for some reason fails to appear for the match. In a tournament, the wrestler could also win by a medical forfeit if for some reason their opponent becomes ill or injured during the course of the tournament and decides not to continue wrestling. For a wrestler to win by forfeit or medical forfeit however, they must appear on the mat in a wrestling uniform. The existence of the forfeit condition encourages teams to have at least one varsity (and one junior varsity) competitor at every weight class. The wrestler who declared the medical forfeit is excused from further weigh-ins but is eliminated from further competition.

=== Team scoring in dual meets ===
On the college level in a dual meet, the wrestler not only wins the match for himself, but also gains points for his team. The number of points awarded to a team during a dual meet depends on the victory condition. It is possible for a team to lose team points in certain infractions, such as unsportsmanlike conduct, flagrant misconduct, team personnel illegally leaving the reserved zone around the mat, and unauthorized questioning of the referee by the coach.

==== Summary of team scoring in a dual meet ====
Victory condition	Number of team points awarded
Fall (pin)	6
Forfeit	6
Default	6
Disqualification	6
Technical fall	5
Major decision	4
Decision	3

In a dual meet, when all team points are totaled, the team with the most points wins the competition. In all victory cases, if there are junior varsity matches, the junior varsity and varsity competitions are scored separately. If this is the case, it is entirely possible for one participating institution to win the junior varsity dual meet and another participating institution to win the varsity dual meet. On the college level, it is possible for a dual meet to end in a tie, except in dual meet advancement tournaments, where then the tie is broken by one team point awarded to the winning team based on certain criteria.

=== Team scoring in tournaments ===
In a tournament, most of the team points are scored for advancement. For example, a team winning a match in the championship bracket would be awarded one team advancement point; one-half of an advancement point would be awarded if a team won a match in the wrestle-back bracket (consolation bracket). The corresponding team points also apply if a wrestler from the team gained a bye and then won their next match in that bracket. Two additional advancement points are for victories by fall, default, disqualification, and forfeit (including victories by medical forfeit). One and one-half additional advancement points are awarded for victories by technical fall. One additional advancement point is awarded for victories by major decision. A team could then win a certain number of placement points if its wrestlers have placed individually in the championship and wrestle-back brackets. Thus, whole teams are awarded placements (first, second, etc.) based on their total number of victories.

Individual placement points are also awarded. For example, in a tournament scoring eight places, the winner of a quarterfinal or a semi-final in the championship bracket (where first and second places are awarded) would win six place points. The winners of first and second place would then win four additional place points. In the wrestle-back bracket (where third and fifth places are awarded), the winner of a semi-final match, for example, would receive three place points. The winners of third, fifth, and seventh place would receive one additional place point, and so on. A more detailed account of how individual and team points are awarded for tournaments is given on pages WR-49 to WR-51 of the 2009 NCAA Wrestling Rules and Interpretations.

== Techniques ==
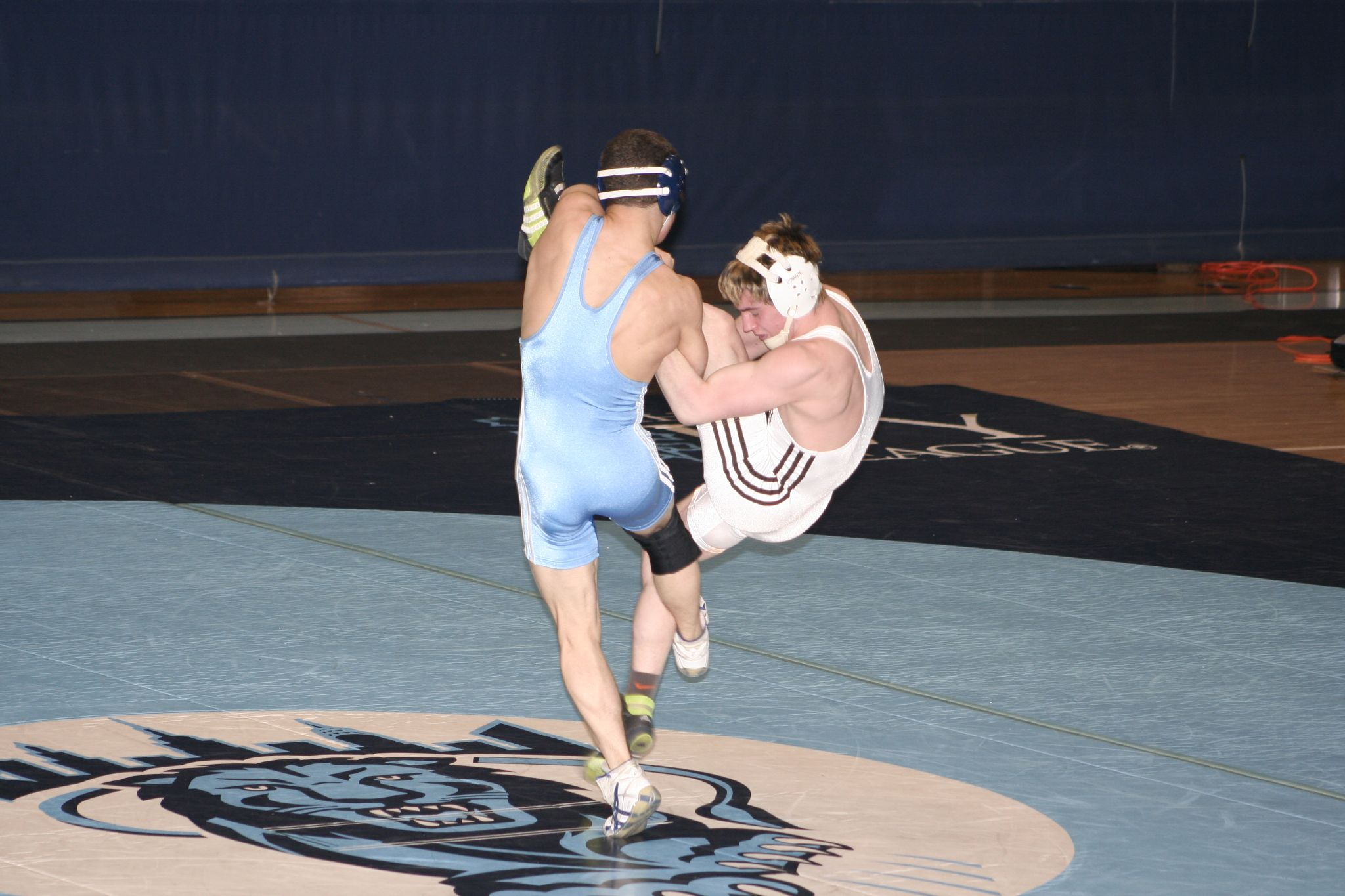
The wrestler in light blue is attempting to finish a single leg takedown to the mat, with the wrestler in white attempting a counter move.

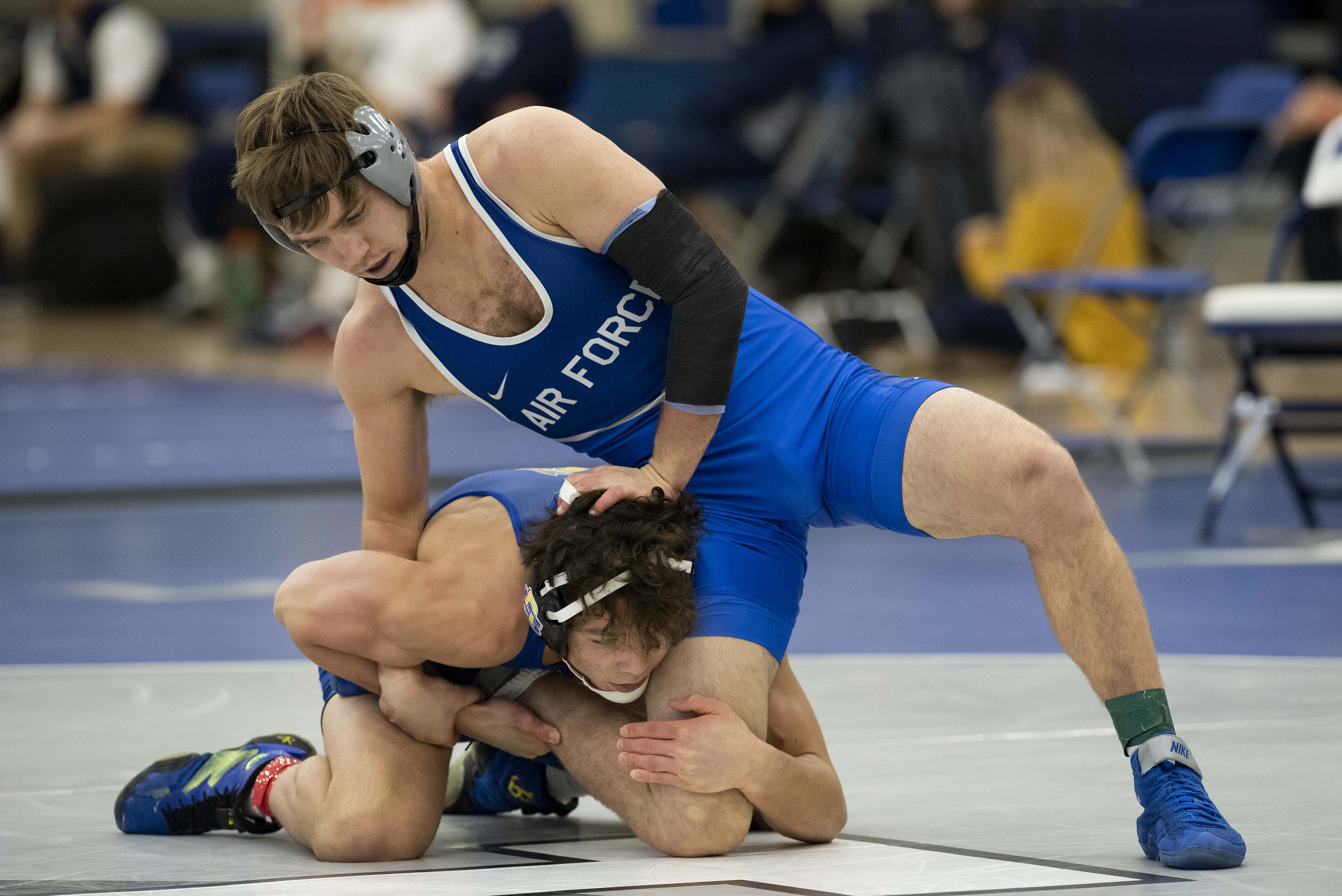
One of the wrestlers pictured here is attempting to get to the neutral position, for a one-point escape.

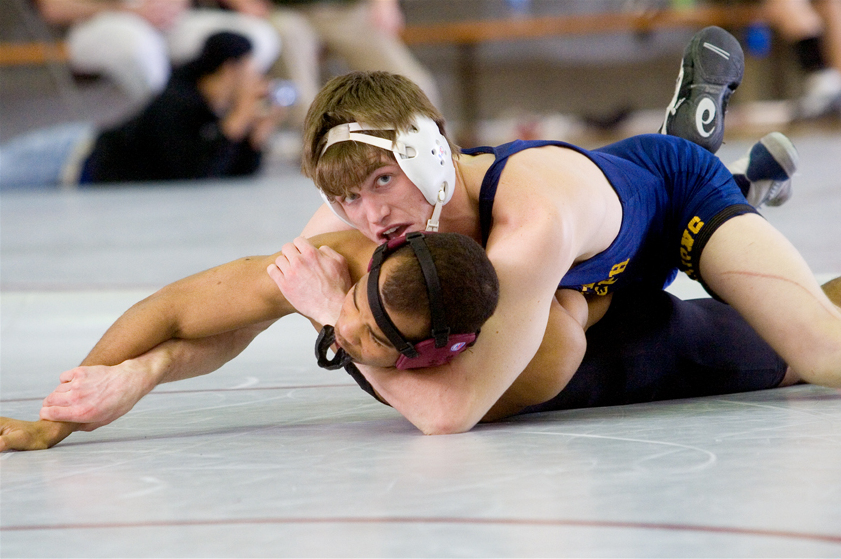
In the top offensive position, the objective is to try and break down the opponent in order to turn them over to their back, to secure near fall points or a pin.

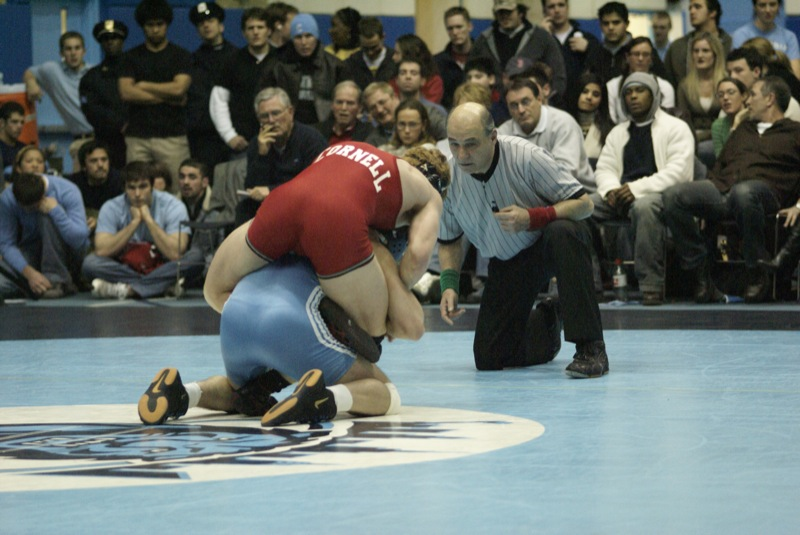
The top wrestler using the leg riding technique, helping to maintain control of the bottom wrestler.

- Neutral
  - Control ties (clinch holds)
    - Wrist tie
    - Bicep tie
    - Elbow tie
    - Collar tie
    - Overtie
    - Underhook
    - Overhook
    - Over-under
    - Body lock
    - 2-on-1 (Russian)
  - Trips
    - Outside trip
    - Inside trip
    - Various foot sweeps
  - Takedowns
    - Lower body
      - Single leg
        - Sweep single (outside single)
        - Low single
      - Double leg
        - Traditional
        - Blast double
      - High crotch
      - Knee picks
      - Ankle picks
      - Spin around
    - Upper body
      - Snap down
      - Duck under
      - Arm drag
      - Slide-by
      - Throw-by
  - Throws
    - Arm spin
    - Head and arm
    - Hip toss
    - Fireman's carry
    - Lateral drop
- Mat wrestling
  - Top
    - Riding
      - Ankle ride
      - Leg riding
        - Double boots
        - Figure four
      - Claw ride
      - Western hook
      - Blair ride
    - Breakdowns
      - Pop and chop (tight waist-chop)
      - Spiral ride/drive
      - Ankle drive (tight waist-ankle)
      - Far knee-far ankle
      - Thigh pry
    - Pinning combination
      - Half-nelson
      - Quarter nelson
      - 3/4 nelson
      - Bar arm (chicken wing)
      - Cradles
        - Far side
        - Near side (suicide cradle)
        - Suitcase
      - Turks
      - Tilts
        - Cross-wrist tilt (elbow tilt)
        - Arm bar tilt (steiner tilt)
        - Ball and chain tilt
    - Mat returns
      - Basic lift
      - Back trip
      - Knee bump
      - Drop to a leg
      - Big boy
  - Bottom
    - Escapes
      - Stand up
      - Sit out
      - Knee slide
      - Quad-pod
      - Gramby
    - Reversals
      - Switch
      - Bridge and roll
      - Scrambling

== Women's collegiate wrestling ==
Women's collegiate wrestling began with the first women's varsity team being created in 1993–94 at the University of Minnesota Morris. The start of the Women's Collegiate Wrestling Association (WCWA) dates to the academic year 2007–2008, marking its formal establishment to govern the domain of women's collegiate varsity wrestling.

There are currently 124 women's college wrestling programs across multiple divisions 42 NAIA teams. 68 NCAA. 14 JUCO. 69 NCWA. and 7 D1 club teams. The sport of wrestling has proved to grow each year bringing in 1,941 athletes in 2022 with 1,651 men and 290 women.

== High school level ==
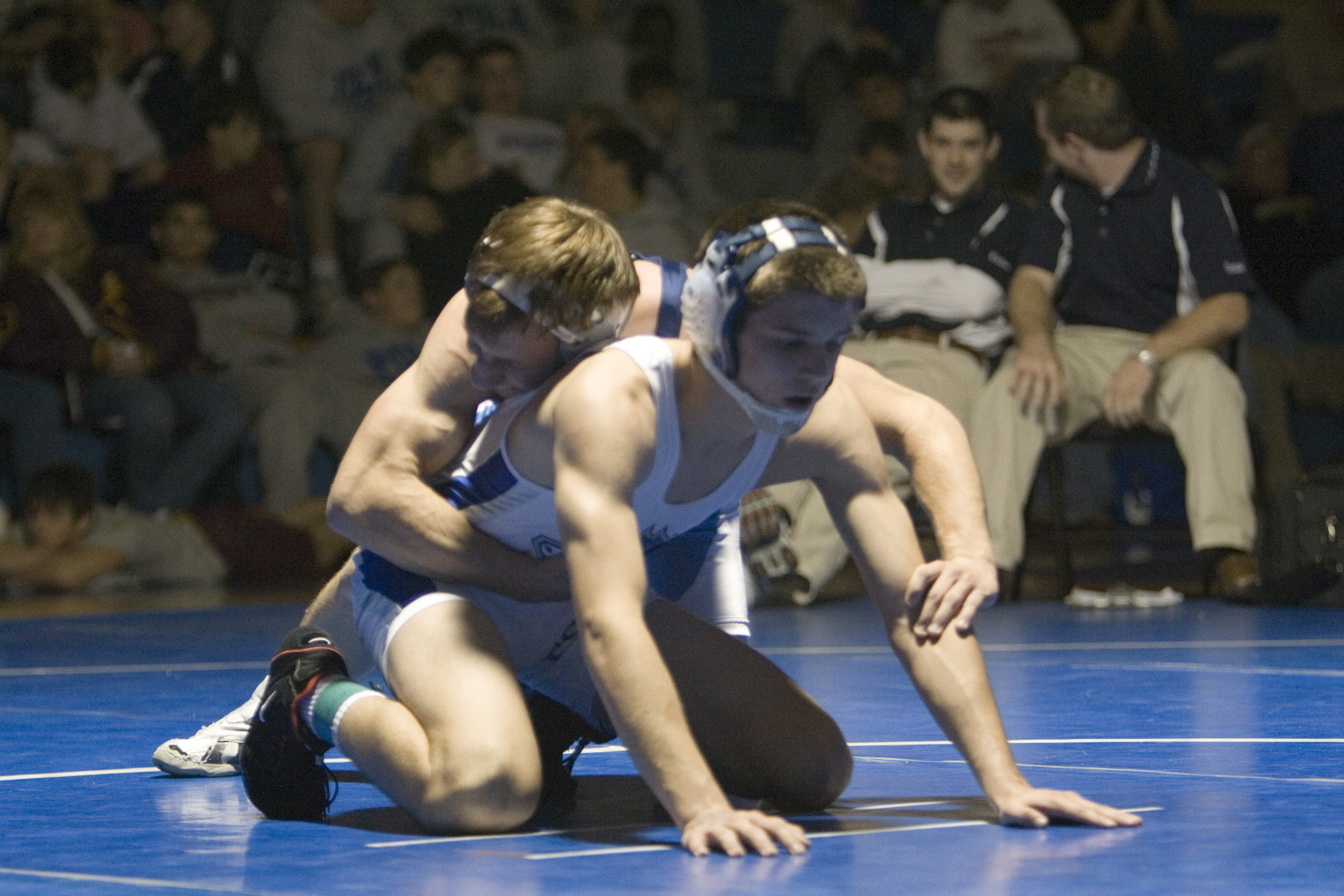
This high school wrestling match resumes in the referee's position.

The term scholastic wrestling is used to differentiate wrestling outside of the collegiate style of rules. It is applied when practiced at the high school and middle (junior high) school level. Although scholastic wrestling and collegiate wrestling are both commonly referred to as folkstyle wrestling. Scholastic wrestling rules differs from collegiate wrestling rules in multiple aspects. Scholastic wrestling is regulated by the National Federation of State High School Associations (NFHS). This association mandates that high school matches are to have periods of shorter length, three periods consisting of two minutes each, than collegiate matches which begin with a three-minute first period. Additionally, college wrestling uses the concept of "time advantage" or "riding time" when one wrestler is in control of the other, while high school wrestling does not.

According to an Athletics Participation Survey taken by the National Federation of State High School Associations, boys' wrestling ranked eighth in terms of the number of schools sponsoring teams, with 9,445 schools participating in the 2006–07 school year. Also, 257,246 boys participated in the sport during that school year, making scholastic wrestling the sixth most popular sport among high school boys. In addition, 5,048 girls participated in wrestling in 1,227 schools during the 2006–07 season. Scholastic wrestling is practiced in all 50 states; with only Mississippi not having an official sanctioned scholastic wrestling championship for high schools. Arkansas, the 49th state to sanction a high school wrestling championship, began competition in the 2008–09 season.

== Youth age-group level ==
At younger age group tournaments in the United States, independent tournaments are often run in "folkstyle", along with freestyle and Greco-Roman styles. To differentiate this style from freestyle and Greco-Roman, the term folkstyle wrestling is a more commonly used phrase than collegiate wrestling at all age levels.

== See also ==
- Amateur wrestling
- Folk wrestling
- Freestyle wrestling
- Greco-Roman wrestling
- Collegiate wrestling moves
- National Collegiate Open Wrestling Championship
- College athletics
- College rivalries
- Intercollegiate women's wrestling champions
- National Wrestling Hall of Fame and Museum
- Stephen Florida, a 2017 novel about college wrestling

== Sources ==
- National Collegiate Athletic Association (August 1, 2008). "2009 NCAA Wrestling Rules and Interpretations" (PDF). NCAA. Archived from the original (PDF) on February 19, 2009.
- National Collegiate Wrestling Association (September 1, 2008). "2008–09 NCWA Wrestling Plan" (PDF). NCWA. Archived from the original (PDF) on December 19, 2008.
- National Federation of State High School Associations (August 1, 2008). 2008–09 NFHS Wrestling Rules Book. NFHS.
- G. & C. Merriam Company (now Merriam-Webster) (1976). Webster's Sports Dictionary. G. & C. Merriam Company (now Merriam-Webster). ISBN 0-87779-067-1.
- Baker, William J. (1982). Sports in the Western World. Totowa, NJ: Rowman and Littlefield. ISBN 0-8476-7075-9.
- Brownstone, David M.; Irene M. Franck (2001). "No. 6359". Famous First Facts About Sports. New York, NY: The H.W. Wilson Company. ISBN 0-8242-0973-7.
- Dellinger, Bob. "Changing of the Guard". National Wrestling Hall of Fame and Museum. Archived from the original on November 21, 2008.
- Dellinger, Bob. "Wrestling in the USA". National Wrestling Hall of Fame and Museum. Archived from the original on November 21, 2008.
- Falla, Jack (1981). NCAA: The Voice of College Sports: A Diamond Anniversary History, 1906–1981. Mission, KS: National Collegiate Athletic Association. ISBN 0-913504-70-X.
- Krisher, Cassie (May 1, 2008). "High School Wrestling Rules Changes Announced for 2008–09". NFHS. Archived from the original on May 21, 2008.
- Poliakoff, Michael (1996). "Wrestling, Freestyle". In Christensen, Karen (ed.). Encyclopedia of World Sport: From Ancient Times to the Present. Vol. 3. Santa Barbara, CA: ABC-CLIO, Inc. pp. 1189–1193. ISBN 0-87436-819-7.
- Seaton, Philip (September 28, 2008). "High School Wrestling Debuts Around Arkansas". HSWrestling.net. Archived from the original on October 11, 2008.
- Simons, Mike (April 4, 2008). "The View From the Mat: Women Wrestlers in Oklahoma". Chronicle of Higher Education. Archived from the original on April 18, 2008.
- Wilson, Eric (November 17, 2005). "Wrestling With Tradition: Keep Your Shirt On". The New York Times.
- Wilson, Robin (April 4, 2008). "Notes From Academe: Oklahoma Hold 'Em". Chronicle of Higher Education.
- Fitzpatrick, Frank (February 16, 2011). "At Cornell, fund-raising just as important to wrestling as mat work". philly.com. Philadelphia Media Network (The Philadelphia Inquirer).
