= Tsuri goshi =

Judo technique

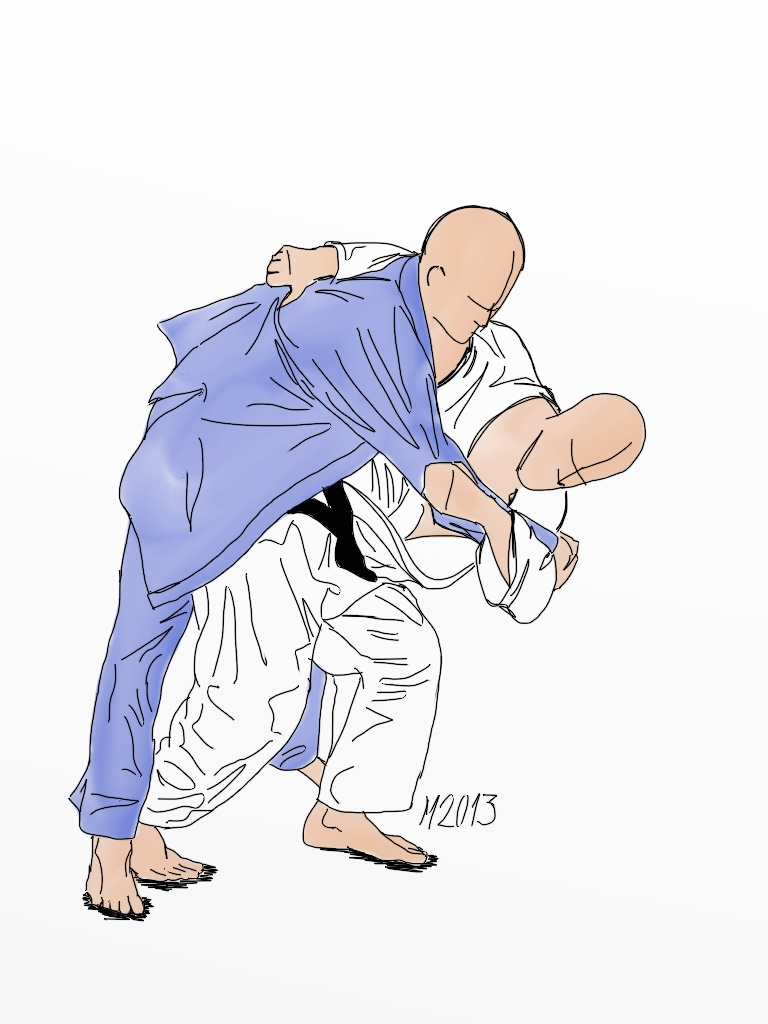
- Classification: Nage-waza
- Sub classification: Koshi-waza
- Kodokan: Yes

Technique name
- Rōmaji: Tsuri goshi
- Japanese: 釣腰
- English: Lifting hip throw
- Korean: 띠잡아 허리 채기

Tsuri goshi (釣腰) is one of the original 40 throws of Judo as developed by Kano Jigoro. It belongs to the third group of the traditional throwing list in the Gokyo no waza of the Kodokan Judo. It is also part of the current 67 Throws of Kodokan Judo. It is classified as a hip technique (koshiwaza).

== Similar Techniques, Variants, and Aliases ==
English aliases:

- Lifting hip throw

Variants:

- Otsuri goshi (large hip throw)
- Kotsuri goshi (small hip throw)

Similar:

- O goshi
- Uki goshi

== See also ==
- Judo technique
- The Canon Of Judo
