= Uki goshi =

Judo technique

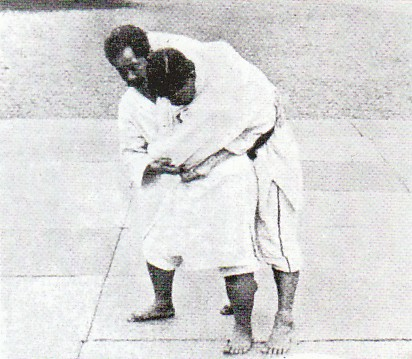
- Uki goshi by Kano (l) and Yamashita (r)
- Classification: Nage-waza
- Sub classification: Koshi-waza
- Kodokan: Yes

Technique name
- Rōmaji: Uki-goshi
- Japanese: 浮腰
- English: Floating hip throw (Half-hip throw)
- Korean: 허리 띄기

Uki Goshi (浮腰) is one of the original 40 throws of Judo as developed by Jigoro Kano. It belongs to the first group, Dai Ikkyo, of the traditional throwing list, Gokyo (no waza), of Kodokan Judo. It is also part of the current 67 throws of Kodokan Judo. It is classified as a hip technique, Koshi-Waza. Uki goshi is known as a favorite throw of Jigoro Kano himself. It is demonstrated in the Nage no kata. It used to be much drilled in traditional judo dojos.

== Technique description ==
Uki Goshi, also known as floating hip, is a type of hip throw. To execute the throw, the person throwing (known as tori) pulls the person being thrown, (known as uke) up and forward putting them off balance. Tori places uke round his/her back while turning so that the side of his/her hip is in close contact with uke and pulling uke's arm around. Tori then twists uke around using tori's back and hip as a pivot point.

Tori's leading leg barely blocks uke's leading leg and tori is initially slightly sideways to uke rather than completely giving his back. It relies on a high level of skill but can be used more easily against heavier people than O Goshi.

== Technique history ==
Uki goshi was developed by Jigoro Kano in the nineteenth century while he was studying Jujutsu in Japan. Kano went on to create Judo and in 1895 he included Uki goshi in the first standard syllabus of Judo throws called the gokyo no waza.

== Included systems ==
Systems:

- Kodokan Judo, Judo Lists

Lists:

- Canon Of Judo
- Judo technique

== Similar techniques, variants, and aliases ==
English aliases:

- Floating hip throw

Similar techniques:

- 1/2 hip throw: uki goshi
- 2/2 hip throw: o goshi
- 3/2 hip throw: koshi guruma
- Pulling hip throw:Tsuri Goshi
