= Stephen Florida =

2017 novel by Gabe Habash

- First edition
- Author: Gabe Habash
- Publisher: Coffee House Press
- Publication date: 2017

Stephen Florida is a 2017 novel by American author Gabe Habash. It is Habash's debut novel. It concerns college wrestling.

== Development ==
Habash was drawn to write about wrestling because of how demanding and unforgiving it is. He sought for the narration and the book to be unpredictable.
