= Cradle (wrestling) =

Wrestling technique

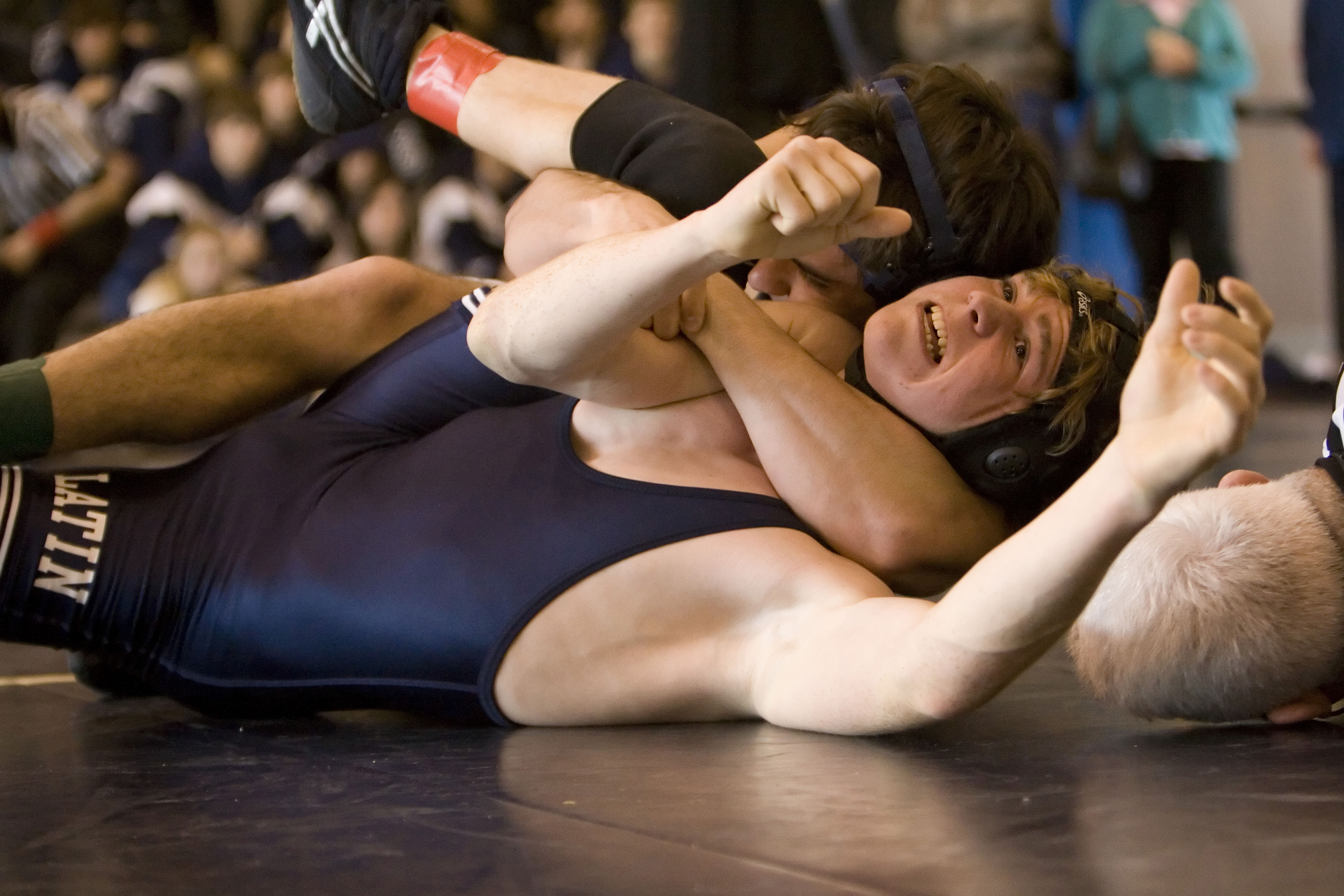
- An example of a cradle, done by a high school wrestler on his opponent in collegiate (or scholastic) wrestling.

The cradle is a basic technique in amateur wrestling which is used to control and pin an opponent. The major purpose is to get into the controlling position while the name refers to the move's similarity to the way a person holds an infant in their arms.

The wrestler performs the cradle by grabbing the neck of their opponent with one arm and wrapping the elbow of the other arm behind the knee of the opponent. The wrestler then locks both hands together to prevent their opponent from escaping. In addition to that, there are many ways to counter the cradle and many variations to the cradle maneuver.

== Types of cradle ==
The "near-side cradle" is done by a wrestler grabbing the leg of the opponent that is closest to them and then wrapping and locking that with the opponent's neck. In addition to that, the "far side cradle" (or "outside cradle"). is executed by laying perpendicular to one's opponent while they are lying belly-down, then take the hand closest the opponent's legs and plant it in between the opponent's legs and cross-face them with the other arm. It further gets intense for opponent when wrestler scrunch arms together in the two directions which allows one's hands to grip together (this would be on the far side of the opponent, hence the name far side cradle). Then one digs their knee into their opponent's buttocks and lean back to get them on their back. Furthermore, when performing a far side cradle is to dig one's head into their opponent's head and squeeze the neck with one's arms, dig one's closest knee to the opponent, into their side, and then take one's free leg and hook their free leg and pull it down to the mat (but not so it is potentially dangerous). It adds more strength while doing it in the far side cradle adds pressure and pain to the opponent so they do not put up as much of a fight.

The "standing cradle" is usually performed after taking an outside leg shot (outside sweep) and pulling the opponent's leg up, with one's arms in between the knee, and one standing to the outside of the opponent. Once one stands up with the leg, get one's arm that is nearest the foot of the leg one has and get it to the outside of the leg, so now both of one's arms are parallel and touch each other. It has a technique in which wrestler takes one's other arm and release the leg with that arm and put it around the opponent's neck. It further starts pulling one's arms together so that they can form a grip, and once they do that, trip them backward slowly. It help the wrestler to put down on the mat which brings him into the position to apply more techniques of cradle and taking it further to win points.

The "clap cradle is performed by pulling the opponent's leg up, placing one's free arm around the opponent's neck before clasping one's hands together to form a grip and trip the opponent quickly to the mat, where one can perform the same moves to the head, side, and leg. Similarly, the "leg cradle" requires a near side cradle position as preparation, and to pull one's arms in together for the grip to be set. Before one sets their grip, one must throw their legs in on the sides that the leg corresponds with the hand.

== Outcomes ==
A wrestler executing the cradle can secure a pin. If the wrestler who cradles their opponent cannot get the pin, they also have the opportunity to gain two or three near fall (or back) points in collegiate wrestling. Conversely, with enough foresight and experience, a cradled wrestler can still exert their raw physical strength to escape from the hold. Application of the cradle leaves later opportunities open for the cradled wrestler to gain an escape or even a reversal over his worn-out opponent.
