= Spladle =

Wrestling technique

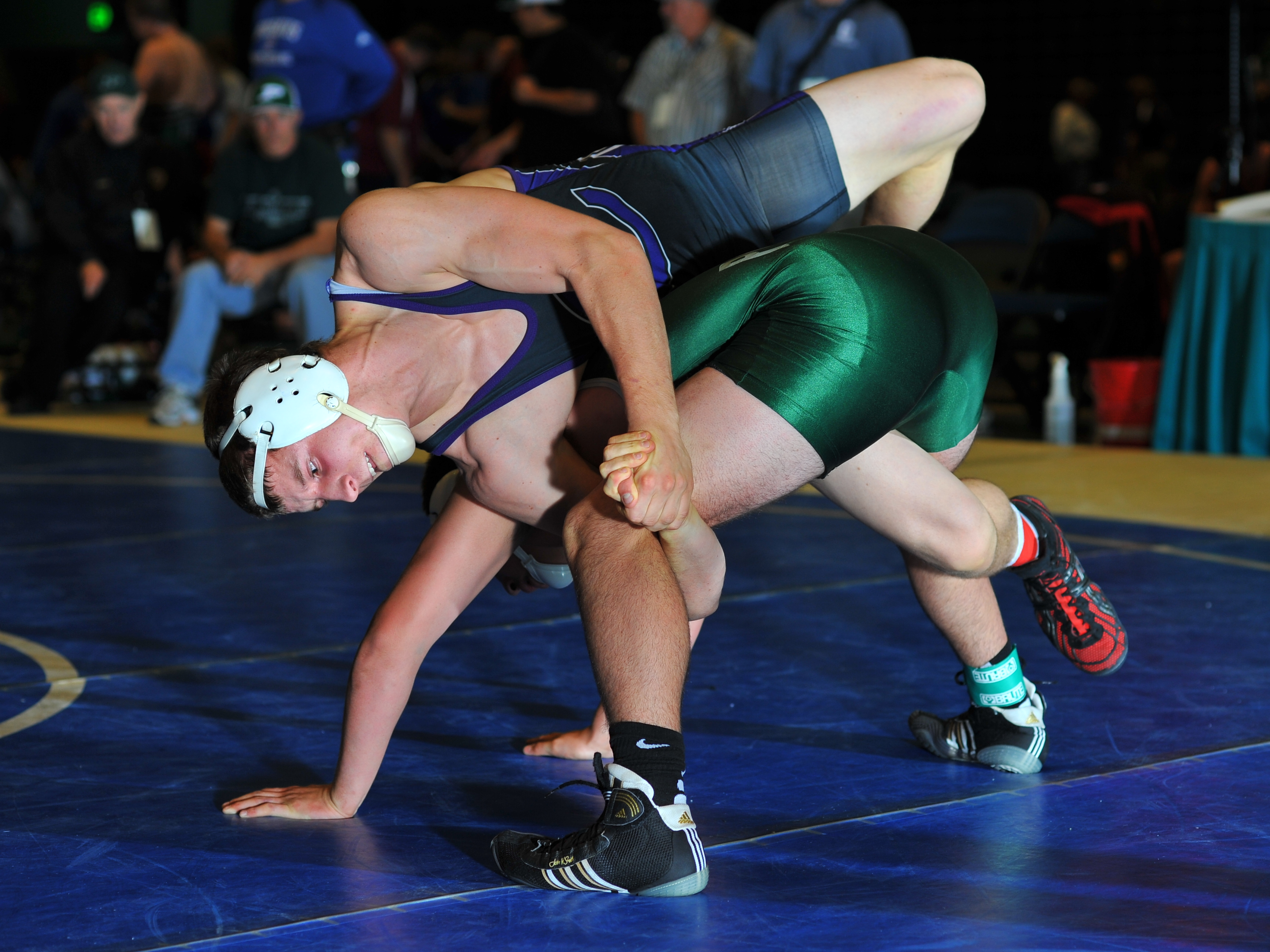
After capturing the legs with his arms and legs he begins rolling over to land on the mat.

The spladle is a wrestling technique commonly used as a counter and pinning move to single leg take downs. When opponents shoot in and grab the leg the wrestler will drop their weight on the opponents head to prevent advancement of the take down, from there they may reach across the body with their arms to grab hold of the opponents far side leg, once completed they wrap the near side leg with the leg targeted for the take down and roll forward onto the mat. When on the floor it is important to control both legs of the opponent as the wrestler wants to bring the knees of his opponent as close to inline with the opponent's head as possible.

As a pin that is the result of countering a take down, this is a very effective technique to use when possible in order to score, however the position in which the two wrestlers land can breed controversy as to who the points will go to. While the wrestler caught in the spladle is certainly unable to effectively do anything, let alone escape, the one who uses it in some cases may have their shoulders flat to the mat as well which could result in them being judged as the one being pinned in some cases. This is caused because it is likely that their shoulder rolled onto the mat first, to determine this the referee would need to reflect on the match he witnessed or review any tape there is if it is available for viewing in order to determine the victor.

== Variations ==
- Counter: This technique is very often used as a counter-style move a variety of the single leg take downs (typically not high crotch unless it is possible to bring down to a manageable position the one attempting said take down) by reaching across the back and getting a hold of both legs as described at the top of the article. While this is the most used variation and the one most commonly seen in competition or demonstration purposes it is not the only way of using this technique.
- Offensive: From certain positions on the mat the opponent may wrap a leg from where there are positions in which one may catch the spladle, typically when the wrestler on the bottom is attempting to reverse positions by attacking a leg with hopes of executing something similar to a single leg style take down, ankle pick or reversal technique involving the wrapping or control of a singular leg. With this sort of style to the spladle where the wrestler on top is working for a pin while the other stalls him or is not sure what to do, there are many possibilities present in order to work towards this pin.

== Double pinning ==
As previously stated in this article, the way by which the wrestlers fall and how they end up on the mat, in the end, can create confusion as to who will win. This is caused by both competitors landing with their shoulders flat on the mat, this is known as a double pin, while not very common of an occurrence they still can happen and result in the point being awarded to the dominant wrestler or the one being pinned based on what happened in the movements and moments leading up to it. Should the wrestler, who is placing the other in the hold, if his shoulders land flat on the mat first he will be the one deemed as pinned, and should the wrestler placed in the pin have his shoulders land flat first then he will be judged to be the one pinned. In order to avoid this situation, it is necessary to, once holding the pin, attempt to ensure that the shoulders stay at minimum 20 degrees off the mat.

== Uses outside of wrestling ==
This technique has uses as a submission as well as a pin, because of the high amount of possible strain placed on the back and hamstrings this hold has a high potential for leading a competitor to quit because of the pain, leading to the submission victory in sports like mixed martial arts, submission wrestling and other grappling sports designed for submission. The effectiveness of this pin as a submission is comparable to the "twister" in the way it places a lot of force on one's spine leading to a lot of pain. Another submission and pin it is similar to it the "electric chair" or "banana split" in that it forces the legs of the one captured in it apart, forward or back in such a way it puts a lot of tension on the hamstring, quad and crotch muscles in the legs which could result in the tearing of said muscles if the competitors and referee are not careful to stop or hold the submission (pin) so no further tension is placed on the legs.
