= Koshi guruma =

Judo technique

Koshi guruma 腰車
- Illustration of the judo throw Koshi-guruma.
- Classification: Nage-waza
- Sub classification: Koshi-waza
- Kodokan: Yes

Technique name
- Rōmaji: Koshi Guruma
- Japanese: 腰車
- English: Hip wheel
- Korean: 허리 돌리기

Koshi Guruma (腰車) ("hip wheel") is one of the original 40 throws of Judo as developed by Jigoro Kano. It belongs to the second group, Dai Nikyo, of the traditional throwing list, Gokyo (no waza), of Kodokan Judo. It is also part of the current 67 Throws of Kodokan Judo.

It is classified as a hip technique, Koshi-waza.

== Technique description ==
In Koshi Guruma the attacker (tori) breaks the opponent’s (uke) balance forward to force his opponent to bend down a little and thereby be able to hold his right arm around the opponent's head. This is no problem against smaller opponents. During this process he wheels his right hip inwards a bit past the opponent's right hip. The legs follow in a series of steps during this wheel and in the new position the attacker simply bends over a bit, thereby lifting the opponent from the ground. The last step is then to rotate the body clockwise as this move throws the opponent to the ground. The attacker can choose to follow into the throw and, if done properly, positions himself directly into Kesa-gatame.

== Technique history ==
Koshi Guruma has been a throw taught by Judo traditionalists since Kano Sensei. Recently, in certain countries such as Canada, Koshi Guruma is frowned upon because of its potential risk of neck injury. It is still taught at a yellow or orange belt level, but banned in some tournaments.

== Included systems ==
Systems:

- Kodokan Judo, Judo Lists

Lists:

- The Canon Of Judo
- Judo technique

== Similar techniques, variants, and aliases ==
Similar techniques

- 1/2 hip throw: uki goshi
- 2/2 hip throw: o goshi
- 3/2 hip throw: koshi guruma

English aliases:

- Hip wheel
