= O goshi =

Judo technique

O goshi 大腰
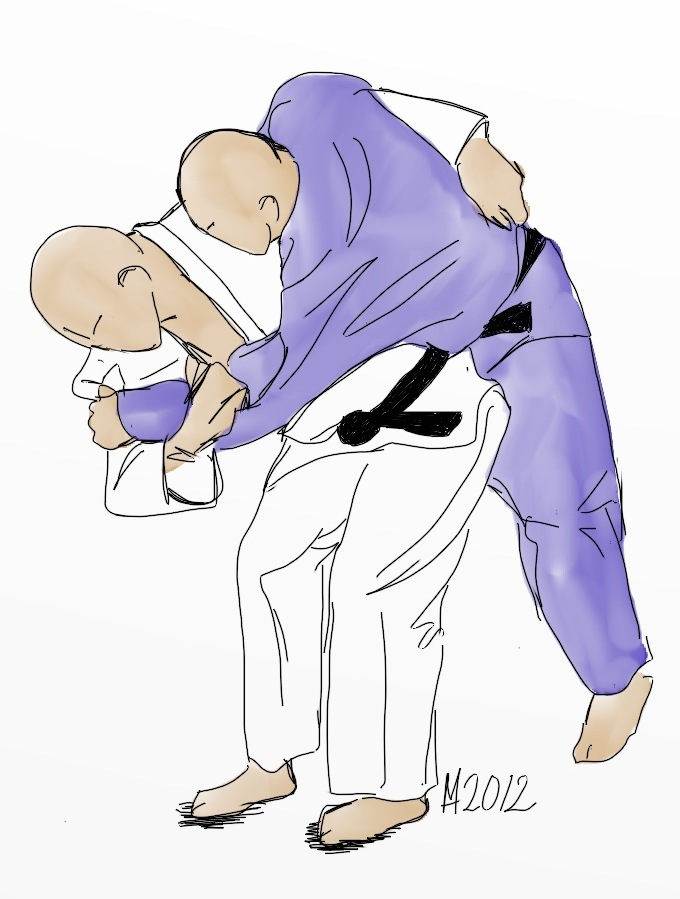
- Illustration of O-goshi
- Classification: Nage-waza
- Sub classification: Koshi-waza
- Kodokan: Yes

Technique name
- Rōmaji: O goshi
- Japanese: 大腰
- English: Major/large hip throw
- Korean: 허리 껴치기

Ō goshi (大腰; major hip throw) is one of the original 40 throws of judo as compiled by Jigoro Kano. It belongs to the Dai ikkyo (第一教; first taught group) of the Gokyo-no-waza (五教之技; five teachings of techniques), of Kodokan Judo. It is also part of the current 67 throws of Kodokan Judo. It is classified as a koshi-waza (腰技; hip technique).

== Technique description ==
O-goshi's classification as a koshi-waza (腰技; hip technique), indicates the central role that the hip plays in the execution of the technique.

In this technique, kuzushi (崩し; the balance break) is to uke's front. Tsukuri (作り; turning/fitting in) involves tori turning his hips, moving them in front and below uke's hips, with tori's tsurite (釣手; lifting (lapel-side) hand)) passing behind uke's back, usually under uke's arm, while minimising the amount of space between tori's back and uke's chest. Tori's hikite (引手; pulling (sleeve-side) hand) pulls uke's arm to the front, maintaining the balance break. Kake (掛け; the execution of the throw) involves tori lifting with the hips and bending forward while continuing the pull to the front and down, bringing uke onto the mat at tori's feet.

== History of technique ==
O-goshi is known to have existed in the Tenjin Shinyō-ryū traditional school (koryū) of jujutsu, which Jigoro Kano studied prior to founding judo. In Tenjin Shinyō-ryū texts, the throw is called koshi-nage (腰投; hip throw) O-goshi was one of the first throwing techniques to be incorporated into judo and was included in the Dai nikyo (第二教; second taught group) of the 1895 Gokyo-no-waza. In the revised 1920 Gokyo-no-waza, the throw was moved to the Dai ikkyo (第一教; first taught group) where it remains. O-goshi is often the first throw taught to a beginner as it is relatively simple to throw a compliant partner with control.

== Use in other systems ==
O-Goshi and similarly applied hip throws are common to all martial arts that have a focus on grappling and throwing. It is named as one of the 20 techniques in Danzan Ryu's Nagete list.

== Similar techniques, variants, and aliases ==
English aliases:

- Major Hip (Roll) Throw
- Large Hip Throw

Similar techniques:

- 1/2 hip throw: uki goshi
- 2/2 hip throw: o goshi
- 3/2 hip throw: koshi guruma
- Tsuri Goshi
