= Temoer Terry =

American wrestler (born 1975)

Temoer Terry (born June 12, 1975 in McPherson, Kansas) is a former college wrestling champion. Wrestling out of the University of Nebraska–Lincoln, (1994–1998), he had a collegiate record of 100-24. Terry had a record of 79-3 at McPherson High School. Terry has also coached at the college level for American University. Also coached for George Mason University

== Awards and highlights ==
Is a member of the National Wrestling Hall of Fame in Stillwater, Oklahoma. 3 time All-American, 2 time Big 8 Champion, 1992 Jr. Greco Roman Nationals-4th, 1992 Jr. Greco Roman World Championships-4th, 1992 Greco Roman World Team Trials-Champion, 1991 Cadet Nationals-Doubles Champion, 7-time Southern Plains Regional Champion, 3-Time Kansas State H.S. Champion
