= Collegiate wrestling moves =

A wrestling move is a technique that helps you directly or indirectly win a wrestling match.

There are four broad categories of collegiate and scholastic wrestling moves.

1. Basic Skills
2. Take-downs
3. Reversals and escapes
4. Rides, breakdowns and pinning combinations

== Basic Skills ==
A basic skill is a wrestling skill or technique that is fundamental to wrestling and/or the basis for other moves. Basic skills should be taught, learned and mastered prior to more advanced moves. The success of other moves are dependent on how well basic skills are executed. These skills should be drilled and retaught on a regular basis.

The seven basic skills are:

1. Stance
2. Motion
3. Level change
4. Penetration
5. Back step
6. Back arch
7. Lift

== Take-downs ==
A take-down is a wrestling move used to go from a neutral standing position to an up position with your opponent in a down position and thus score two take-down points.

Some basic takedowns include:

- Double leg
- Single leg
- High crotch

These moves are usually taught at a young age through high school. These takedowns are simple and very effective at all levels of wrestling.

== Rides, breakdowns and pinning combinations ==
Double grapevine (Saturday night ride) - extends the upper and lower body usually leading to a power half or tilt tilt- exposing, but not pinning, the opponents shoulders to the mat earning near fall points; half nelson-run perpendicular to the opponent with one arm under the near shoulder and on top the head cradle-a leg and an arm locked around the head with a butterfly, or wrist lock; stack- stacking an opponent on their shoulders, additionally, pins can be obtained from tilts and cradles.
