= Freestyle wrestling =

Style of wrestling

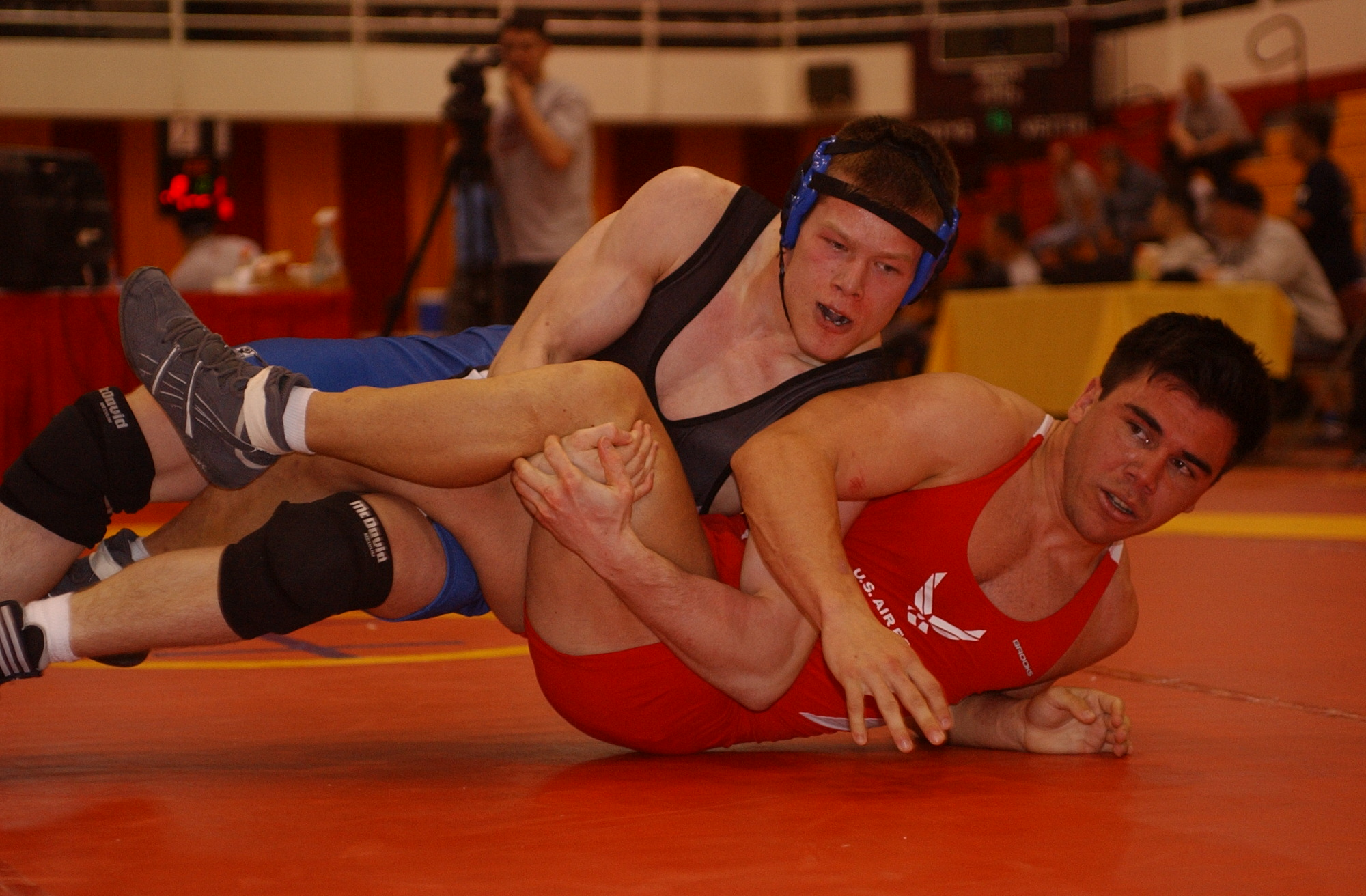
- Two wrestlers competing in freestyle wrestling match, March 2006
- Focus: Wrestling, Grappling
- Hardness: Full-contact
- Famous practitioners: (see notable practitioners below)
- Parenthood: Catch wrestling and various other international wrestling styles
- Olympic sport: Since 1904

Freestyle wrestling is a style of wrestling. It is one of two styles of wrestling contested in the Olympic Games, along with Greco-Roman. High school wrestling and men's collegiate wrestling in the United States are conducted under different rules and termed scholastic and collegiate wrestling. U.S. collegiate women's wrestling is conducted under freestyle rules.

Freestyle wrestling, like collegiate wrestling, has its origins in catch-as-catch-can wrestling. In both styles, the ultimate goal is to throw and pin the opponent to the mat, which results in an immediate win. Unlike Greco-Roman, freestyle and collegiate wrestling allow the use of the wrestler's or the opponent's legs in offense and defense.

According to wrestling's world governing body, the United World Wrestling (UWW), freestyle wrestling is one of the six main forms of amateur competitive wrestling practiced around the globe today. The other five forms are as follows:

1. Greco-Roman wrestling
2. Grappling/submission wrestling
3. Beach wrestling
4. Pankration athlima
5. Traditional/folk wrestling.

In 2013, the executive board of the International Olympic Committee (IOC) recommended dropping wrestling as a sport from the 2020 Olympic Games, but the decision was reversed later that same year by the IOC.

== History ==
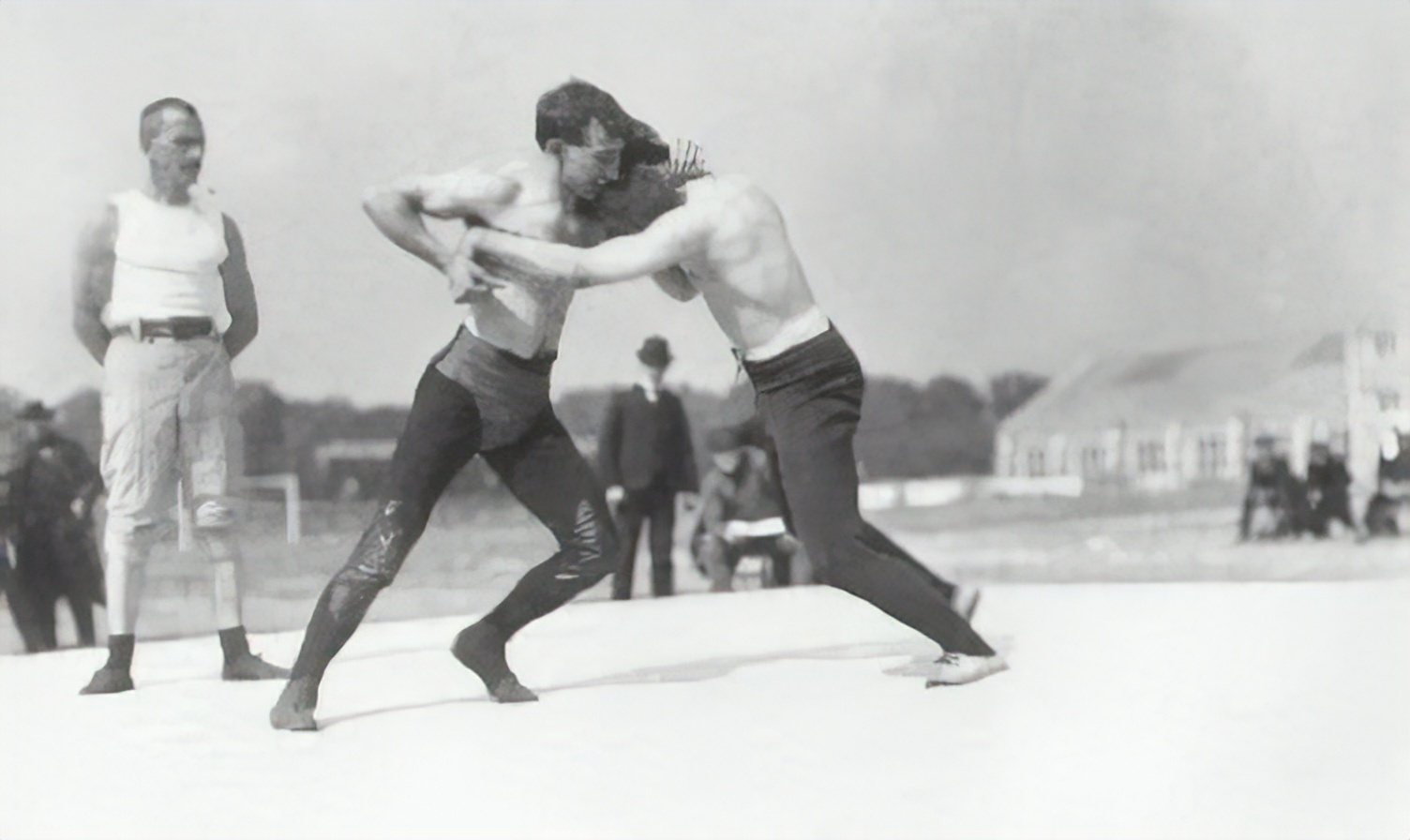
A freestyle wrestling match at the 1904 Summer Olympics in St. Louis

Modern freestyle wrestling, according to UWW (formerly FILA), has been said to have originated in Great Britain and the United States by the name of "catch-as-catch-can" wrestling. "Catch-as-catch-can" wrestling had a particular following in Great Britain and the variant developed in Lancashire had a particular effect on freestyle wrestling. "Catch-as-catch-can" wrestling gained great popularity in fairs and festivals during the 19th century. In catch-as-catch-can wrestling, both contestants started out standing and then a wrestler sought to hold his opponent's shoulder to the ground (known as a fall). If no fall was scored, both wrestlers continued grappling on the ground, and almost all holds and techniques were allowable. A Scottish variant of Lancashire wrestling also became popular, which began with both wrestlers standing chest to chest, grasping each other with locked arms around the body and, if no fall was made, with the match continuing on the ground. In addition, there was the Irish collar-and-elbow style, where wrestlers started out on their feet with both wrestlers grasping each other by the collar with one hand and by the elbow with the other. If neither wrestler then achieved a fall, the contestants would continue both standing and on the ground until a fall was made. Irish immigrants later brought this style of wrestling to the United States, where it soon became widespread, especially because of the success of the wrestling champion of the Army of the Potomac, George William Flagg from Vermont. Catch-as-catch can was the style performed by at least a half dozen U.S. presidents, including George Washington, Zachary Taylor, Abraham Lincoln, Andrew Johnson, Ulysses S. Grant, and Theodore Roosevelt.

Because of the widespread interest in and esteem of professional Greco-Roman wrestling and its popularity in many international meets in nineteenth century Europe, freestyle wrestling (and wrestling as an amateur sport in general) had a tough time gaining ground on the continent. The 1896 Olympic Games had only one wrestling bout, a heavyweight Greco-Roman match. Freestyle wrestling first emerged as an Olympic sport in the St. Louis Olympics of 1904. All 40 wrestlers who participated in the 1904 Olympics were American. The 1904 Olympics sanctioned the rules commonly used for catch-as-catch-can, but imposed some restrictions on dangerous holds. Wrestling by seven weight classes—47.6 kg (104.9 lb), 52.2 kg (115.1 lb), 56.7 kg (125.0 lb), 61.2 kg (134.9 lb), 65.3 kg (143.9 lb), 71.7 kg (156.7 lb), and greater than 71.7 kg (158 lb)—was an important innovation in the Summer Olympics.

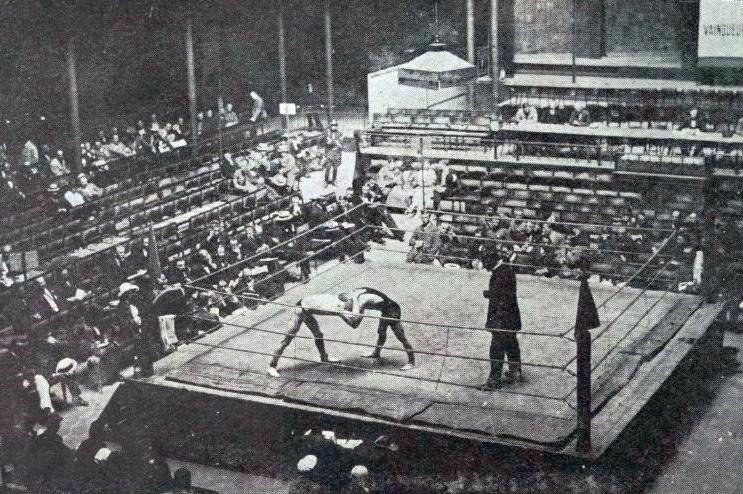
Freestyle Wrestling at the 1920 Summer Olympics was contested on a wrestling ring

Since 1921, the body now known as United World Wrestling (UWW), which has its headquarters near Lausanne, Switzerland, has set the "Rules of the Game", with regulations for scoring and procedures that govern tournaments such as the World Games and the competition at the Summer Olympics. These were later adopted by the Amateur Athletic Union (AAU) for its freestyle matches. Freestyle wrestling gained great popularity in the United States after the Civil War. By the 1880s, tournaments drew hundreds of wrestlers. The rise of cities, increased industrialization, and the closing of the frontier provided the affable environment for amateur wrestling, along with boxing, to increase in esteem and popularity. Amateur wrestling teams soon emerged, such as the wrestling team of the New York Athletic Club, which had its first tournament in 1878. Professional wrestling also developed, and by the 1870s, professional championship matches offered allowances of up to $1,000.

Nineteenth century wrestling matches were particularly long, and especially Greco-Roman bouts (where holds below the waist and the use of the legs are not allowed) could last as many as eight to nine hours, and even then, it was only decided by a draw. In the 20th century, time limits were set for matches. For more than forty years into the twentieth century, freestyle and its USA counterpart, collegiate wrestling, did not have a scoring system that decided matches in the absence of a fall. The introduction of a point system by Oklahoma State University wrestling coach Art Griffith gained acceptance in 1941 and influenced the international styles as well. By the 1960s international wrestling matches in Greco-Roman and freestyle were scored by a panel of three judges in secret, who made the final decision by raising colored paddles at the match's end. Dr. Albert de Ferrari from San Francisco who became vice president of FILA (now UWW), lobbied for a visible scoring system and a rule for "controlled fall", which would recognize a fall only when the offensive wrestler had done something to cause it. These were soon adopted internationally in Greco-Roman and freestyle. By 1996, before a major overhaul of FILA rules, an international freestyle match consisted of two three-minute periods, with a one-minute rest between periods. Today, wrestlers from post-Soviet states, Iran, the United States, Bulgaria, Cuba, Turkey, and Japan have had the strongest showings. Alexander Medved of Belarus won 10 world championships and three Olympic gold medals from 1964 to 1972. Many collegiate wrestlers have moved on to freestyle competition, particularly internationally with great success.

In the spring of 2013, the International Olympic Committee (IOC) voted wrestling out of the core sports for the summer Olympics beginning in 2020. As a result of this news the wrestling community started a massive campaign in order to reinstate the sport. A largely online group called 2020 vision lead the movement. They had several campaigns as well as Facebook and Twitter pages that spread awareness and gathered support for the cause of wrestling's return to the Olympics. They had a mission of gaining 2,000,020 signatures (online and offline) in support of wrestling's return to the Olympic Games. In September 2013 the IOC voted to allow wrestling back into the Olympics for 2020 and 2024 as a probationary sport. In order to achieve this, UWW made several changes to the rules as well as changes to the weight classes. There are also discussions about uniform changes as well as changes to the competition mat.

== Weight classes ==
Currently, international men's freestyle wrestling is divided into six main age categories: schoolboys, cadets, novice, juvenile, juniors, and seniors. Schoolboys (boys ages 14–15; or age 13 with a medical certificate and parental authorization) wrestle in 10 weight classes ranging from 34 to 85 kg (75–187 lb). Cadets (young boys ages 16–17; or age 15 with a medical certificate and parental authorization) wrestle in 10 weight classes ranging from 41 to 110 kg (90 to 243 lb). Juniors (young men ages 18 to 20; or age 17 with a medical certificate and parental authorization) wrestle in eight weight classes ranging from 57 to 125 kg (126–276 lb). Seniors (men ages 20 and up) wrestle in seven weight classes ranging from 57 to 125 kg (126 to 276 lb). For men, there is also a special category for some freestyle competitions, "Veterans", for men ages 35 and older, presumably featuring the same weight classes as seniors. Also, all of the men's age categories and weight classes can be applied to Greco-Roman wrestling.

Women currently compete in freestyle wrestling in one of four age categories on an international level: schoolgirls, cadets, juniors, and seniors. Schoolgirls (young women ages 14–15; or age 13 with a medical certificate and parental authorization) wrestle in 10 weight classes ranging from 28 to 62 kg (62–137 lb). Cadets (young women ages 16–17; or age 15 with a medical certificate and parental authorization) wrestle in 10 weight classes ranging from 36 to 70 kg (79–154 lb). Juniors (young women ages 18 to 20; or age 17 with a medical certificate and parental authorization) wrestle in eight weight classes ranging from 40 to 72 kg (88–159 lb). Seniors (women ages 20 and up) wrestle in seven weight classes ranging from 44 to 72 kg (97–159 lb). Wrestlers after weigh-in may only wrestle in their own weight class. Wrestlers in the senior age category may wrestle up a weight class except for the heavyweight division (which starts at a weight more than 96 kg (212 lb) for the men and more than 67 kg (148 lb) for the women). Different nations may have different weight classes and different age categories for their levels of freestyle competition.

== Layout of the mat ==
The match takes place on a thick rubber mat that is shock-absorbing to ensure safety. For the Olympic Games, all World Championships, and World Cups, the mat has to be new. The main wrestling area has a nine-meter diameter and is surrounded by a 1.5-metre (4.9 ft) border of the same thickness known as the protection area. Inside the nine meter in diameter circle is a red band of one meter (3 ft 3 in) in width that is on the outer edge of the circle and is known as the red zone. The red zone is used to help indicate passivity on the part of a wrestler; thus, it is also known as the passivity zone. Inside the red zone is the central wrestling area which is seven meters 7 metres (23 ft 0 in) in diameter. In the middle of the central surface of wrestling is the central circlewhich is one meter in diameter. The central circle is surrounded by a band 10 centimeters (4 in) wide and is divided in half by a red line eight centimeters (3 1/8 in) in width. The diagonally opposite corners of the mat are marked with the wrestlers' colors, red and blue or in some areas, red and green.

For competition in the Olympic Games, the World Championships, and the Continental Championships, the mat is installed on a platform no greater than 1.1 metres (3 ft 7 in) in height. If the mat lies on a podium and the protection margin (covering and free space around the mat) does not reach two meters (6 ft 6 in), the sides of the podium are covered with 45° (degree) inclined panels. In all cases, the color of the protection area is different from the color of the mat.

== Equipment ==
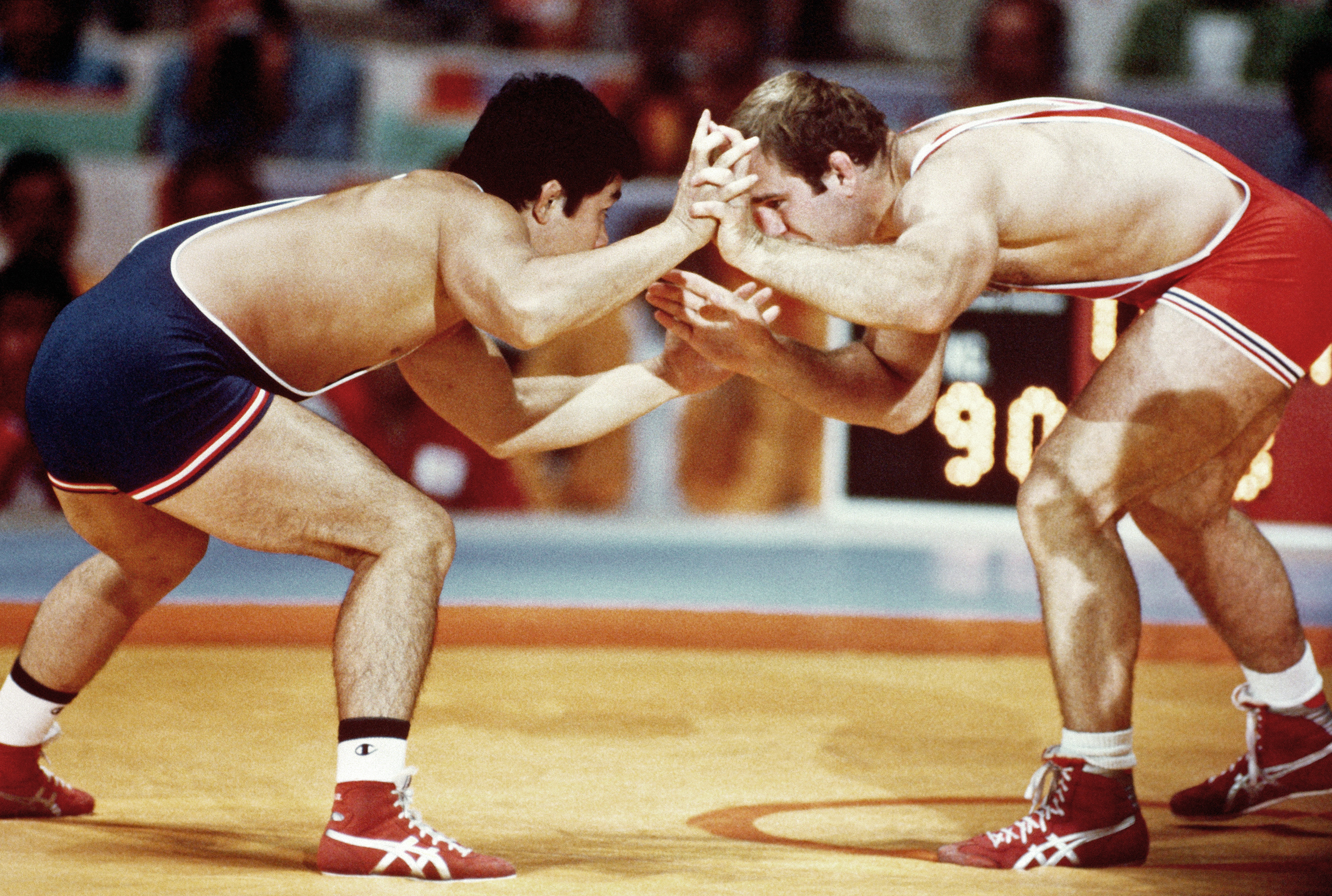
Freestyle wrestling typically involves one wrestler wearing a blue singlet and one wearing a red singlet to distinguish the two for scoring purposes

- A singlet is a one-piece wrestling garment made of spandex that should provide a tight and comfortable fit for the wrestler. It is made from nylon or lycra and prevents an opponent from using anything on the wrestler as leverage. One wrestler usually competes in a red singlet and the other in a blue singlet.
- A special pair of shoes is worn by the wrestler to increase their mobility and flexibility. Wrestling shoes are light and flexible in order to provide maximum comfort and movement. Usually made with rubber soles, they help give the wrestler's feet a better grip on the mat.
- A handkerchief, also called a bloodrag, is carried in the singlet. In the event of bleeding, the wrestler will remove the cloth from his singlet and attempt to stop the bleeding or clean up any bodily fluids that may have gotten onto the mat.
- Headgear, equipment worn around the ears to protect the wrestler, is optional in freestyle. Headgear is omitted at the participant's own risk, as there is the potential to develop cauliflower ear.

== The match ==
A match is a competition between two individual wrestlers of the same weight class. In freestyle wrestling, a jury (or team) of three officials (referees) is used. The referee controls the action in the center, blowing the whistle to start and stop the action, and supervises the scoring of holds and infractions. The judge sits at the side of the mat, keeps score, and occasionally gives his approval when needed by the referee for various decisions. The mat chairman sits at the scoring table, keeps time, is responsible for declaring technical superiority, and supervises the work of the referee and judge. To call a fall, two of the three officials must agree (usually, the referee and either the judge or the mat chairman).

=== Session format ===
In Greco-Roman and freestyle, the format is two three-minute sessions. Before each match, each wrestler's name is called, and the wrestler takes his place at the corner of the mat assigned to his color. The referee then calls both of them to his side at the center of the mat, shakes hands with them, inspects their apparel, and checks for any perspiration, oily or greasy substances, and any other infractions. The two wrestlers then greet each other, shake hands, and the referee blows his whistle to start the session.

A wrestler wins the match when he has outscored his opponent at the end of the two three-minute sessions. For example, if one competitor were to score four points in the first session and his opponent two, and then two in the second session, his opponent zero, the competitor would win. Only a fall, injury default, or disqualification terminates the match; all other modes of victory result only in session termination.

In freestyle, if no wrestler scores in two minutes, the referee of the match will then identify the more passive wrestler, and that wrestler will be given a thirty-second window of opportunity to score, and if he doesn't, then his opponent will be awarded a point.

When the session (or match) has concluded, the referee stands at the center of the mat facing the officials' table. Both wrestlers then approach each other, shake hands, and stand on either side of the referee to await the decision. The referee then proclaims the winner by raising the winner's hand. At the end of the match, each wrestler then shakes hands with the referee and returns to shake hands with his opponent's coach.

=== Match scoring ===
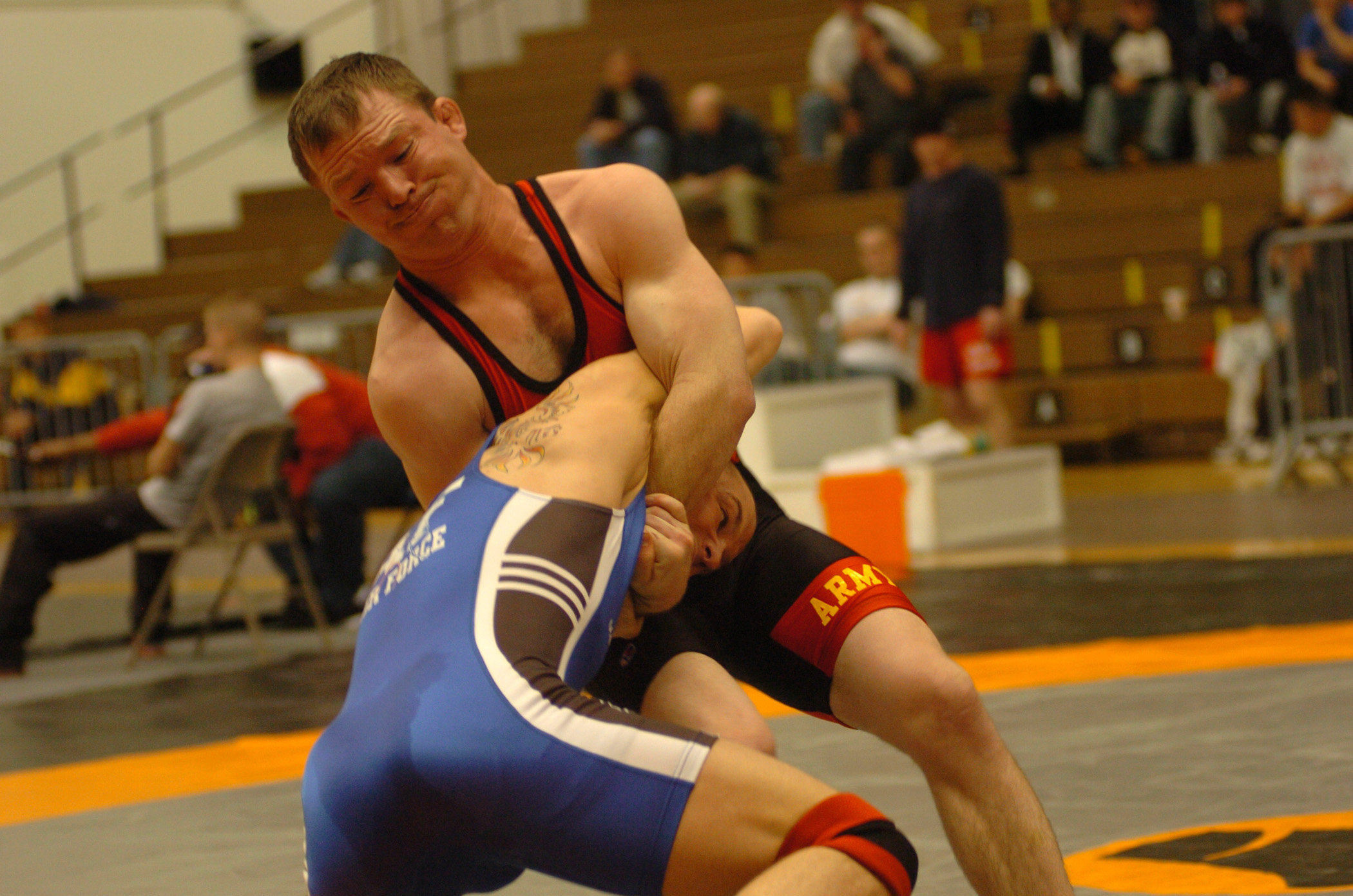
A freestyle wrestler locks the arms of his opponent in order to take him down to the mat

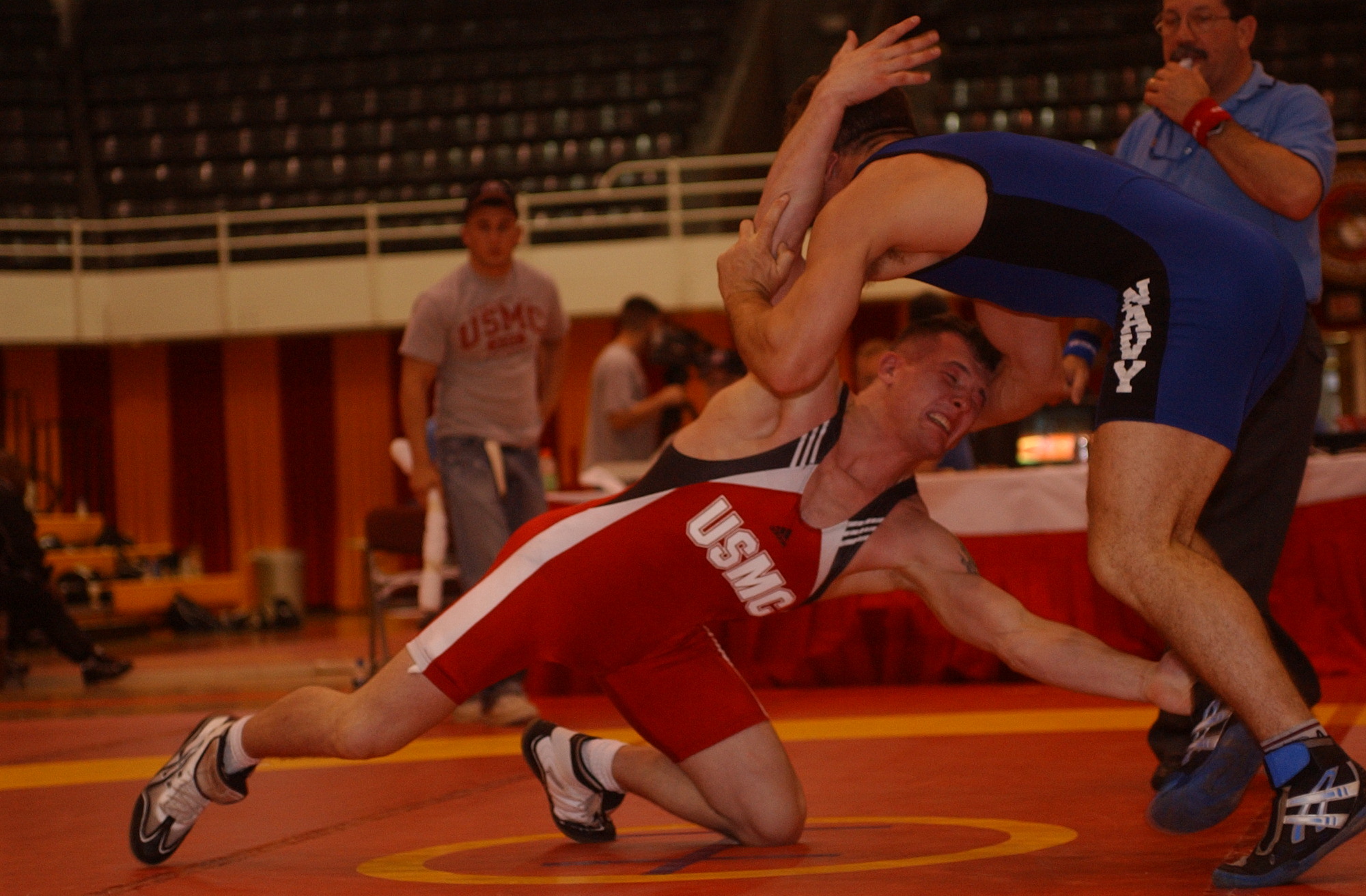
A takedown attempt during a freestyle match

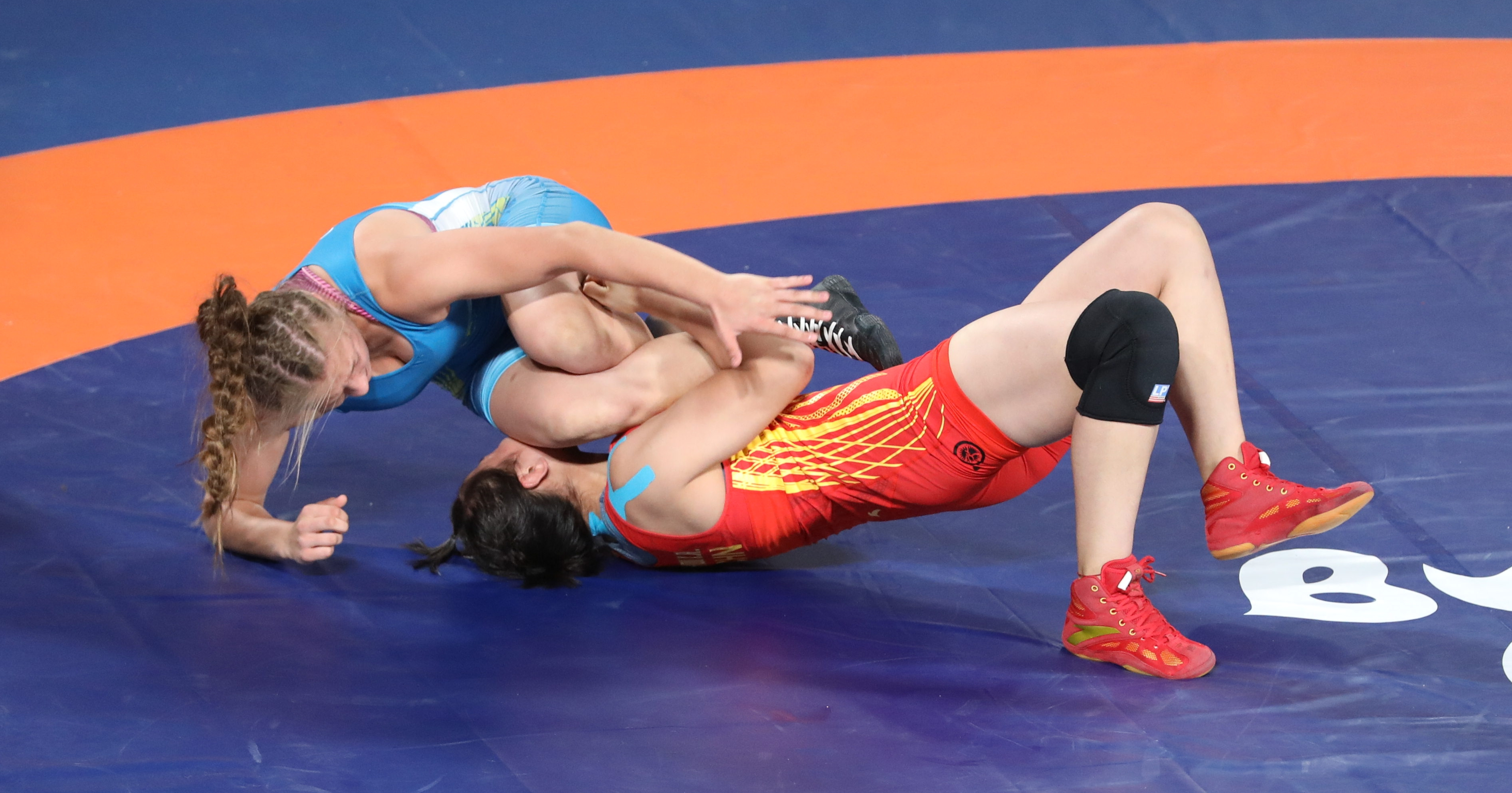
The wrestler in red attempting to turn her opponent in blue from leg lace position

In freestyle wrestling, as well as in Greco-Roman wrestling, points are awarded mostly on the basis of explosive action and risk. For example, when one wrestler performs a grand amplitude throw that brings his opponent into the danger position, he is awarded the greatest number of points that can be scored in one instance. Also, a wrestler who takes the risk to briefly roll on the mat (with his shoulders in contact with the mat) could give a certain number of points to his opponent. Scoring can be accomplished in the following ways:

- Takedown (2 to 5 points): A wrestler is awarded points for a takedown when the wrestler gains control over his opponent on the mat from a neutral position (when the wrestler is on his feet). At least three points of contact have to be controlled on the mat (e.g. two arms and one knee; two knees and one arm or the head; or two arms and the head).

(5 points): 5 points are awarded for a takedown brought about by a throw of grand amplitude (a throw in which a wrestler brings his opponent off of the mat and controls him so that his feet go directly above his head) either from the standing or par terre position into a direct and immediate danger position.
(4 points): 4 points are awarded for a takedown brought about by a throw of grand amplitude as in the 5-point throw, but does not put the opponent into a direct and immediate danger position or if the opposing wrestler maintains contact with at least one hand on the mat.
(3 points): Generally, three points are awarded for a takedown brought about by a short amplitude throw that does not bring his opponent in a direct and immediate danger position or for a takedown in which a wrestler's opponent is taken from his feet or his stomach to his back or side (a throw of short amplitude) so that he is in the danger position.
(2 points): Two points are awarded for a takedown brought about by a wrestler taking his opponent from his feet to his stomach or side such that his back or shoulders are not exposed to the mat and while in this position holding him down with control.

- Reversal (1 point): A wrestler is awarded one point for a reversal when the wrestler gains control over his opponent from a defensive position (when the wrestler is being controlled by his opponent).
- Exposure, also called the Danger Position (2 or 3 points): A wrestler is awarded points for exposure when the wrestler exposes his opponent's back to the mat for several seconds. Points for exposure are also awarded if one's back is to the mat but the wrestler is not pinned. Criteria for exposure or the danger position is met when 1) a wrestler's opponent is in a bridge position to avoid being pinned, 2) a wrestler's opponent is on one or both elbows with his back to the mat and avoids getting pinned, 3) a wrestler holds one of his opponent's shoulders to the mat and the other shoulder at an acute angle (less than 90 degrees), 4) a wrestler's opponent is in an "instantaneous fall" position (where both of his shoulders are on the mat for less than one second), or 5) the wrestler's opponent rolls on his shoulders. A wrestler in the danger position allows his opponent to score two points. An additional hold-down point may be earned by maintaining the exposure continuously for five seconds.
- Penalty (1 or 2 points): Under the 2004-2005 changes to the international styles, a wrestler whose opponent takes an injury time-out receives one point unless the injured wrestler is bleeding. Other infractions (e.g. fleeing a hold or the mat, striking the opponent, acting with brutality or intent to injure, using illegal holds, etc.) are penalized by an award of either one or two points, a Caution, and a choice of position to the opponent. A wrestler whose opponent regularly refuses to take an ordered hold is awarded a point. Three cautions automatically result in the match being awarded to the opponent.
- Out-of-Bounds (1 point): Whenever a wrestler places his foot in the protection area, the match is stopped, and one point is awarded to his opponent.
- Passivity (1 point): A point awarded to the attacking wrestler whose opponent flees the hold or refuses to start.

Classification points are also awarded in an international wrestling tournament, which give most points to the winner and in some cases, one point to the loser depending on the outcome of the match and how the victory was attained. For example, a victory by fall would give the winner five classification points and the loser no points, while a match won by technical superiority with the loser scoring technical points would award three points to the winner and one point to loser.

The full determinations for scoring are found https://unitedworldwrestling.org/sites/default/files/2018-04/wrestling_rules.pdf in the UWW International Wrestling Rules].

== Victory conditions ==
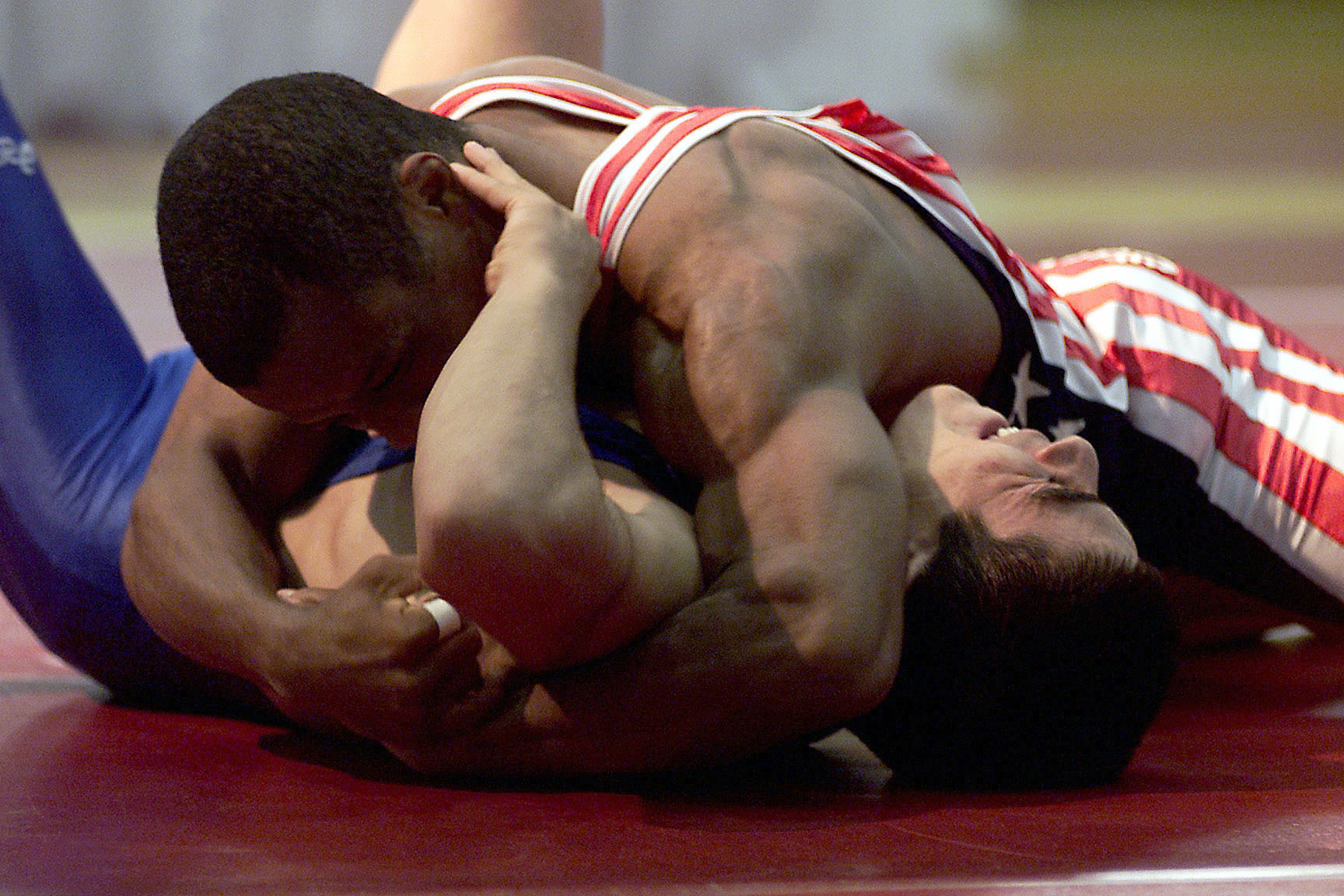
The wrestler on top working to secure a fall in this freestyle wrestling match

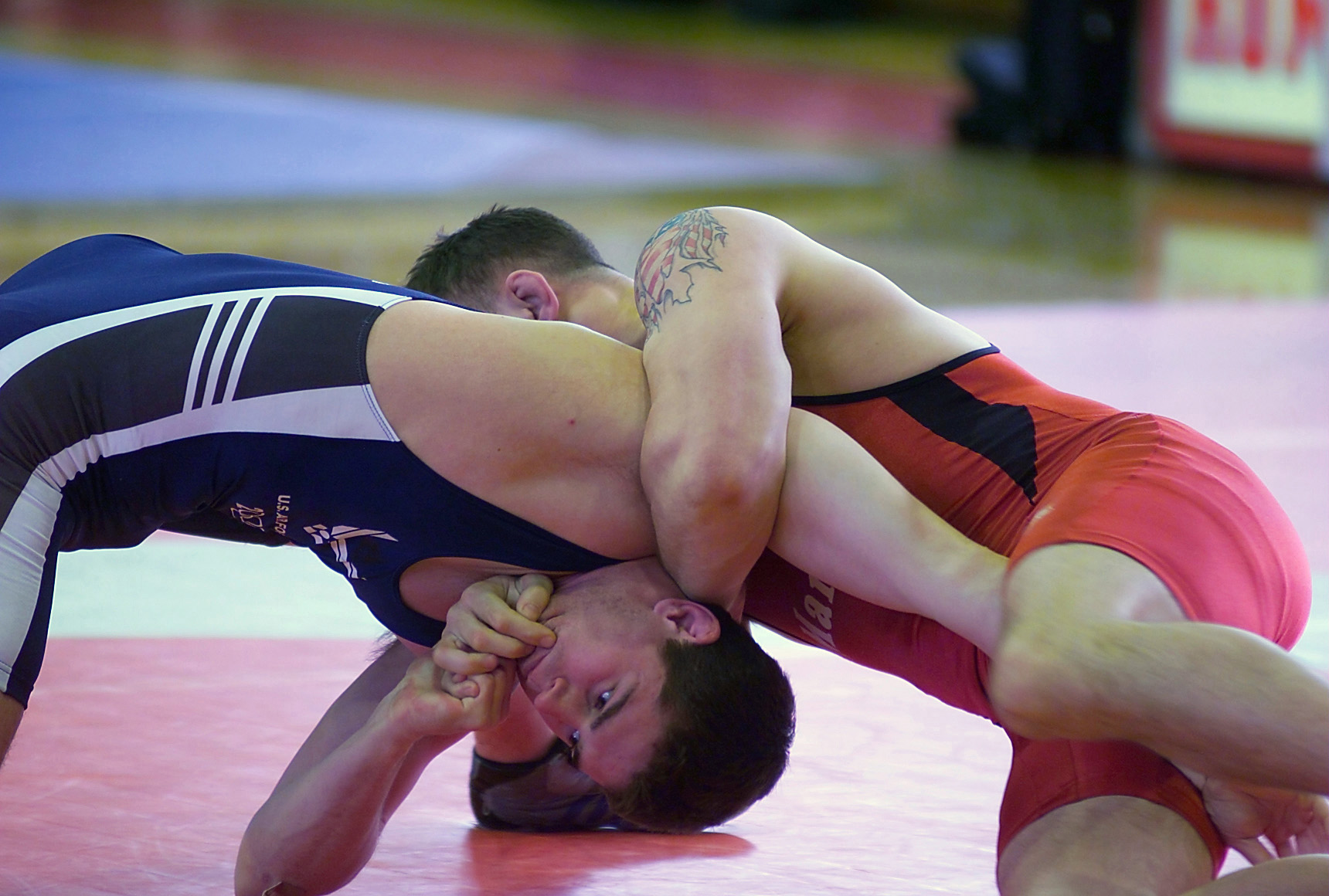
Collegiate and scholastic wrestling, the form of wrestling at the collegiate and high school levels, focuses on one wrestler's dominance and control of the other while freestyle wrestling involves a greater emphasis on explosive action by wrestlers

A match can be won in the following ways:

- Win by Fall: The object of the entire wrestling match is to attain victory by what is known as the fall. A fall, also known as a pin, occurs when one wrestler holds both of his opponents' shoulders on the mat simultaneously. In Greco-Roman and freestyle wrestling, the two shoulders of the defensive wrestler must be held long enough for the referee to "observe the total control of the fall" (usually ranging from one half-second to about one or two seconds). Then either the judge or the mat chairman concurs with the referee that a fall is made. (If the referee does not indicate a fall, and the fall is valid, the judge and the mat chairman can concur together and announce the fall.) A fall ends the match entirely regardless of when it occurs.
- Win by Technical Superiority (Also called Technical Fall): If at any point during the match, a wrestler gains a ten-point lead over his opponent, the wrestler would win the match by technical fall.
- Win by Decision: If neither wrestler achieves either a fall or technical superiority, the wrestler who scored more points during match is declared the winner.
- Win by Default: If one wrestler is unable to continue participating for any reason or fails to show up on the mat after his name was called three times before the match begins, his opponent is declared the winner of the match by default, forfeit, or withdrawal.
- Win by Injury: If one wrestler is injured and unable to continue, the other wrestler is declared the winner. This is also referred to as a medical forfeit or injury default. The term also encompasses situations where wrestlers become ill, take too many injury time-outs, or bleed uncontrollably. If a wrestler is injured by his opponent's illegal maneuver and cannot continue, the wrestler at fault is disqualified.
- Win by Disqualification: Normally, if a wrestler is assessed three Cautions for breaking the rules, he is disqualified. Under other circumstances, such as flagrant brutality, the match may be ended immediately and the wrestler disqualified and removed from the tournament.

=== Team scoring in tournaments ===
In an international wrestling tournament, teams enter one wrestler at each weight class and score points based on the individual performances. For example, if a wrestler at the 60 kg weight class finishes in first place, then his team will receive 10 points. If he were to finish in tenth place, then the team would only receive one. At the end of the tournament, each team's score is tallied, and the team with the most points wins the team competition.

=== Team competition ===
A team competition or dual meet is a meeting between (typically two) teams in which individual wrestlers at a given weight class compete against each other. A team receives one point for each victory in a weight class regardless of the outcome. The team that scores the most points at the end of the matches wins the team competition. If there are two sets of competitions with one team winning the home competition and one winning the away competition, a third competition may take place to determine the winner for ranking purposes, or the ranking may take place by assessing in order: 1) the most victories by adding the points of the two matches; 2) the most points by fall, default, forfeit, or disqualification; 3) the most matches won by technical superiority; 4) the most periods won by technical superiority; 5) the most technical points won in all the competition; 6) the fewest technical points won in all the competition. This works similarly when more than two teams are involved in this predicament.

== Women's freestyle wrestling ==
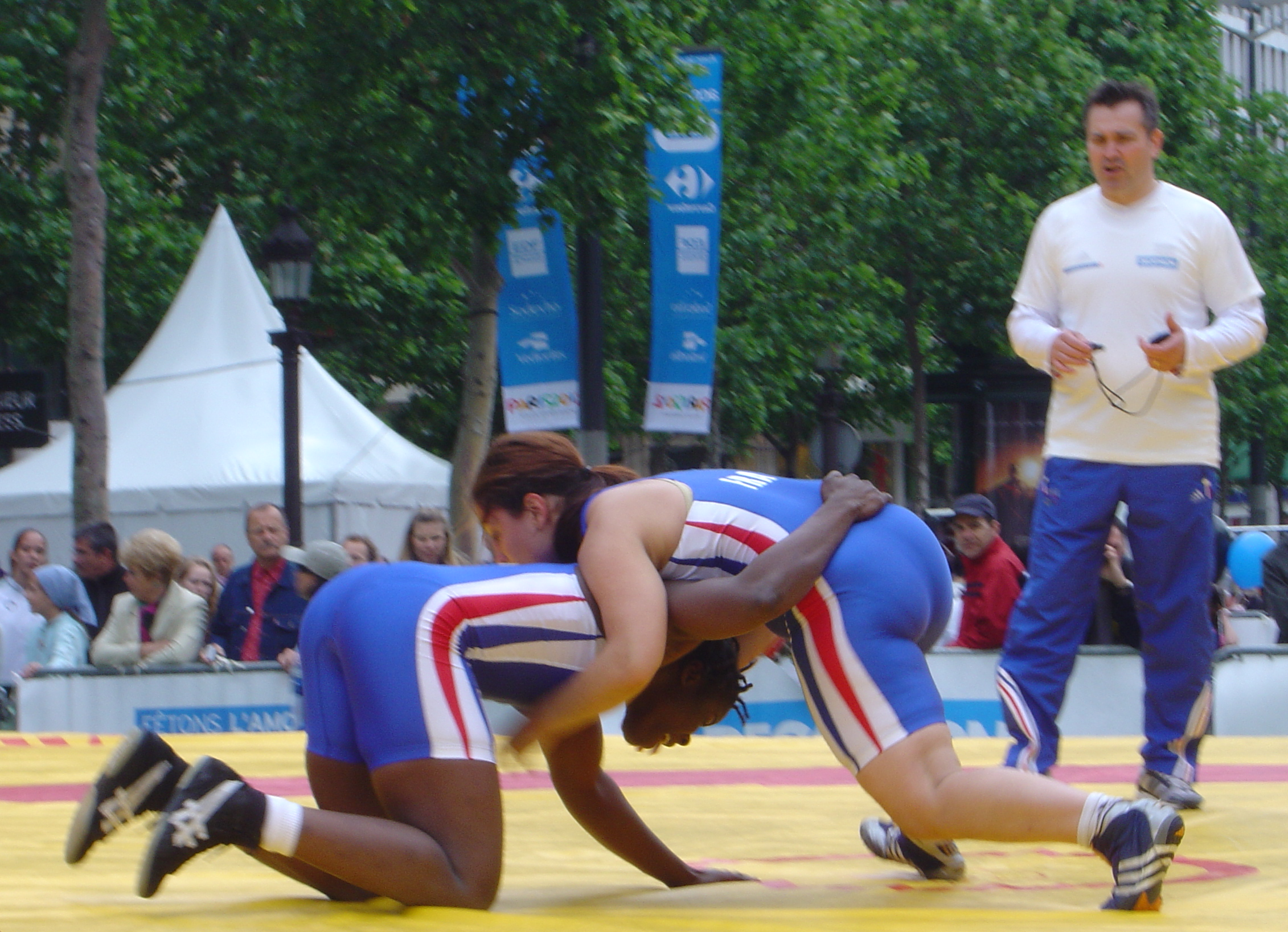
Women competing in a freestyle wrestling match

Women compete in freestyle wrestling at the collegiate, world, and Olympic levels. Women's freestyle wrestling made its Olympic debut at the 2004 Summer Olympics. There are ten weight classes for women (50 kg, 53 kg, 55 kg, 57 kg, 59 kg, 62 kg, 65 kg, 68 kg, 72 kg and 76 kg) that compete in World Championships. However, after the 2020 Olympic Games, there are only six weight classes (50 kg, 53 kg, 57 kg, 62 kg, 68 kg and 76 kg). Only one representative from each weight class is permitted to compete in the Olympics.

Freestyle wrestling was added to the NCAA Emerging Sports for Women program effective with the 2020–21 school year. At that time, 35 NCAA members sponsored women's wrestling teams.

Wrestlers wear a red or blue singlet, depending on their bracket placement; all female competitors are required to wear a women's-cut singlet.

== See also ==
- Amateur wrestling
- Catch wrestling
- Folk wrestling
- Greco-Roman wrestling
- List of World and Olympic Champions in men's freestyle wrestling
- List of World and Olympic Champions in women's freestyle wrestling
- Submission wrestling
