= Wrestling shoe =

Footwear used in wrestling

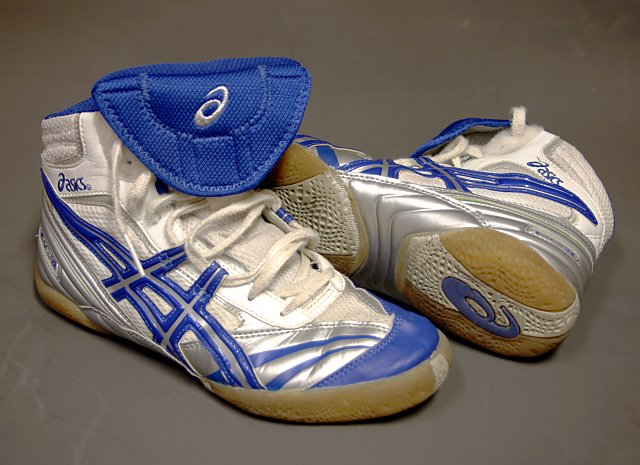
A pair of wrestling shoes

Wrestling shoes are a type of athletic footwear used in training and competition for the sport of wrestling. They are designed to be lightweight and flexible, providing traction and ankle support on wrestling mats. The use of appropriate footwear in wrestling is also associated with reduced transmission of skin infections in mat sports.

== See also ==
- List of shoe styles
- Wrestling singlet
- Wrestling headgear
- Amateur wrestling
- Collegiate wrestling
- Freestyle wrestling
- Greco-Roman wrestling
