= Wrestling singlet =

One-piece uniform worn by wrestlers

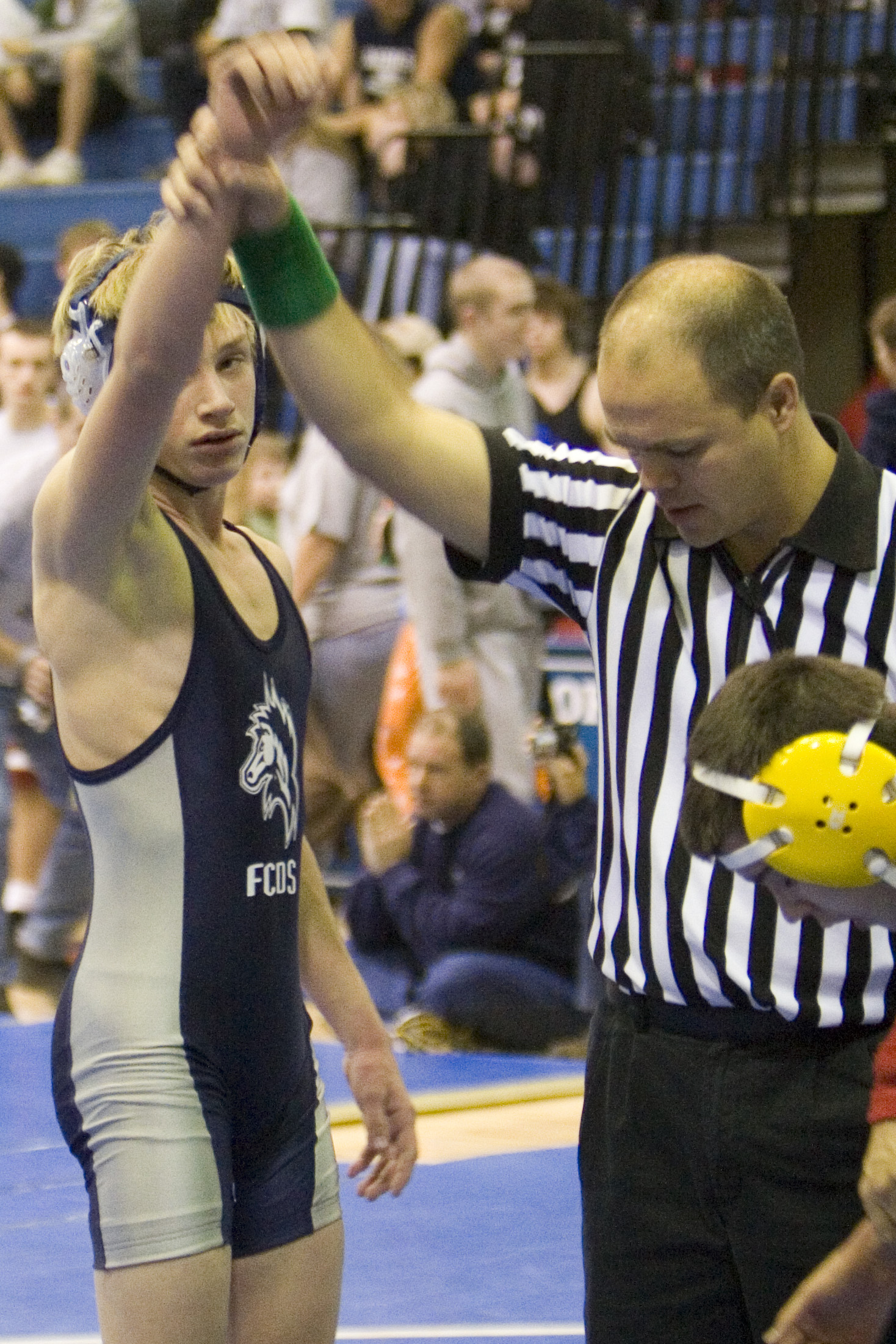
High school wrestler in a high-cut singlet

A wrestling singlet (or simply singlet) is a one-piece, tight-fitting uniform, usually made of spandex (elastane) or nylon, used in amateur wrestling and professional wrestling. The uniform is tight-fitting so as not to be grasped accidentally by one's opponent, and it allows the referee to see each wrestler's body clearly when awarding points or a pin. Unlike judo, it is illegal to grasp an opponent's clothing in all styles of amateur wrestling.

== Colors ==
In most high school and college wrestling matches, the competitors wear singlets in their team colors. To designate a competitor's color for scoring purposes an anklet may also be worn.

In international wrestling (freestyle and Greco-Roman), wrestlers bring a red and a blue singlet (or reversible singlet) and are told before the match which color to wear.

Historically, professional wrestlers traditionally wore trunks and boots but singlets are also common among wrestlers, who usually (although not always) had an amateur background, such as Bret Hart, Kurt Angle and Shelton Benjamin. Many of these are much more stylized than those worn by amateurs, although the use of singlets in professional wrestling has declined in the last two decades.

== Other wrestling clothing ==
=== Shirtless ===
College wrestlers often wore trunks or tights with bare chests until the mid-1960s, when the NCAA discontinued the option and required shirts.

Real Pro Wrestling athletes wrestled shirtless in spandex trunks for the league's early 2000s televised matches. Wrestler Teague Moore praised the uniform, saying the men preferred trunks to singlets. They already stripped to the waist in training, he added, "so it wasn't much of a change."

In 2013 FILA President Nenad Lalović proposed Greco-Roman Olympians compete bare-chested in long trousers. He argued the uniform would attract viewers and improve the sport's image by replacing the "old fashioned" singlet. Akil Patterson had reservations about wrestling shirtless, but said he would do so if it would "put more fans in the seats."

=== Doublet ===
A new style of singlet, known as a double or doublet, that covers more of the upper body has recently emerged in college wrestling. Made of the same spandex material, it is sleeve-like rather than the traditional thin-strap, open-chested singlet more commonly worn. This type of singlet is usually worn with accompanying tight-fitting shorts, and it is used as an alternative to the singlet for those who are uncomfortable with wearing singlets for modesty or aesthetic reasons. It is currently only allowed on the college level, although there is report that some high school wrestlers use the style in practice sessions.

Only with special permission are wrestlers allowed to wear T-shirts under their singlets, most commonly for sanitary reasons involving excessive acne on the chest or back.

== Cuts ==
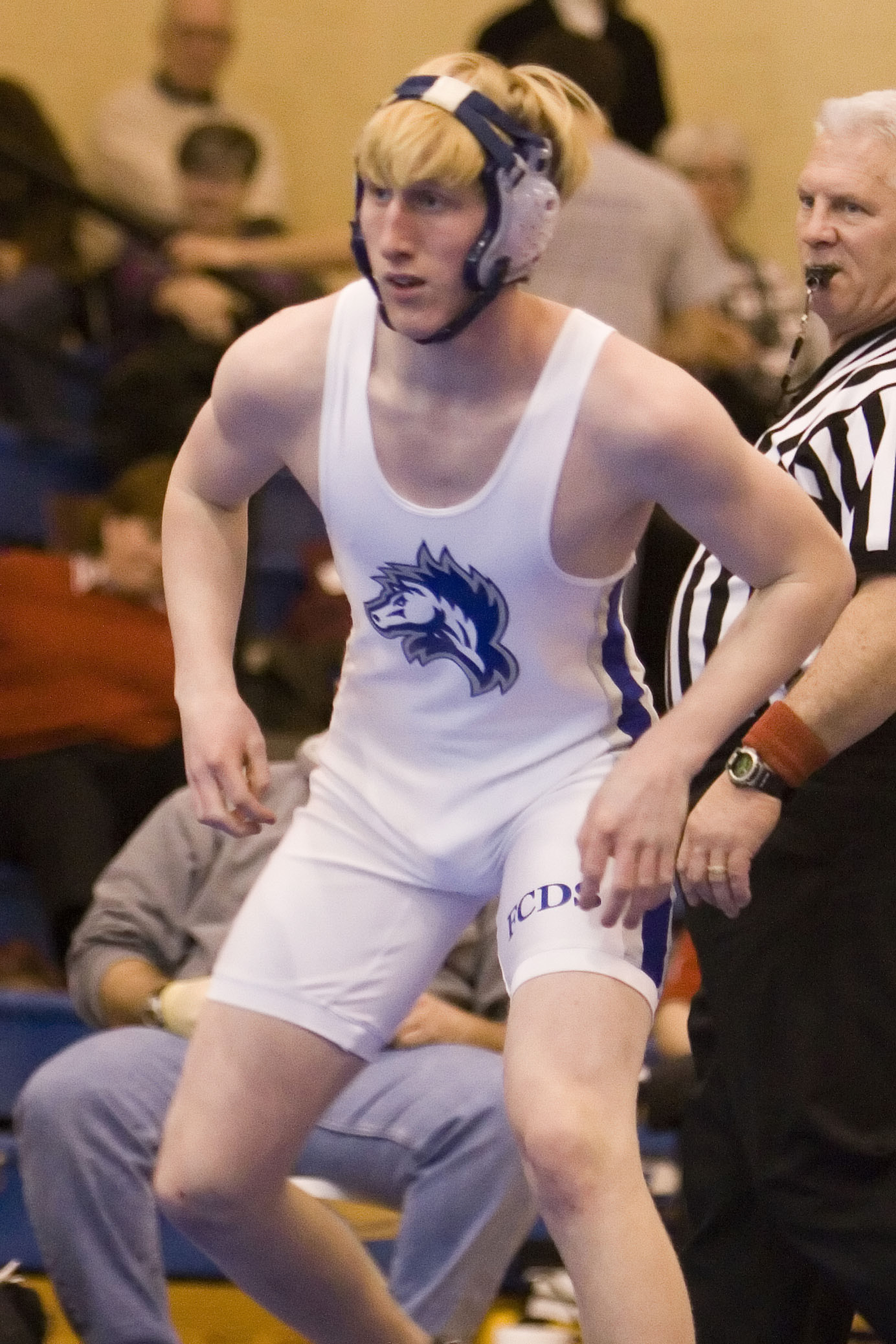
A wrestler in a high-cut white singlet

There are three different traditional cuts to wrestling singlets: the high, the FILA, and the low.

1. The high cut covers much of the chest and reaches up toward the under-arms on the side. It is more popular among female wrestlers as a way to better cover their breasts as mandated by the 4-1-1 rule.
2. The FILA cut is similar but does not rise up as high beneath the arms.
3. The low cut reaches down to the middle abdomen in the front and to the hips on the sides, and it features a single, very thin strap that runs up the back. It is cooler, and some find it more comfortable. Low-cut singlets are no longer worn at the Olympics or World Championships, which accept only a high or FILA cut.

== See also ==
- Amateur wrestling
- Collegiate wrestling
- Freestyle wrestling
- Greco-Roman wrestling
- Leotard
- Wrestling shoes
- Wrestling headgear
