= Amateur wrestling =

Widespread form of sport wrestling

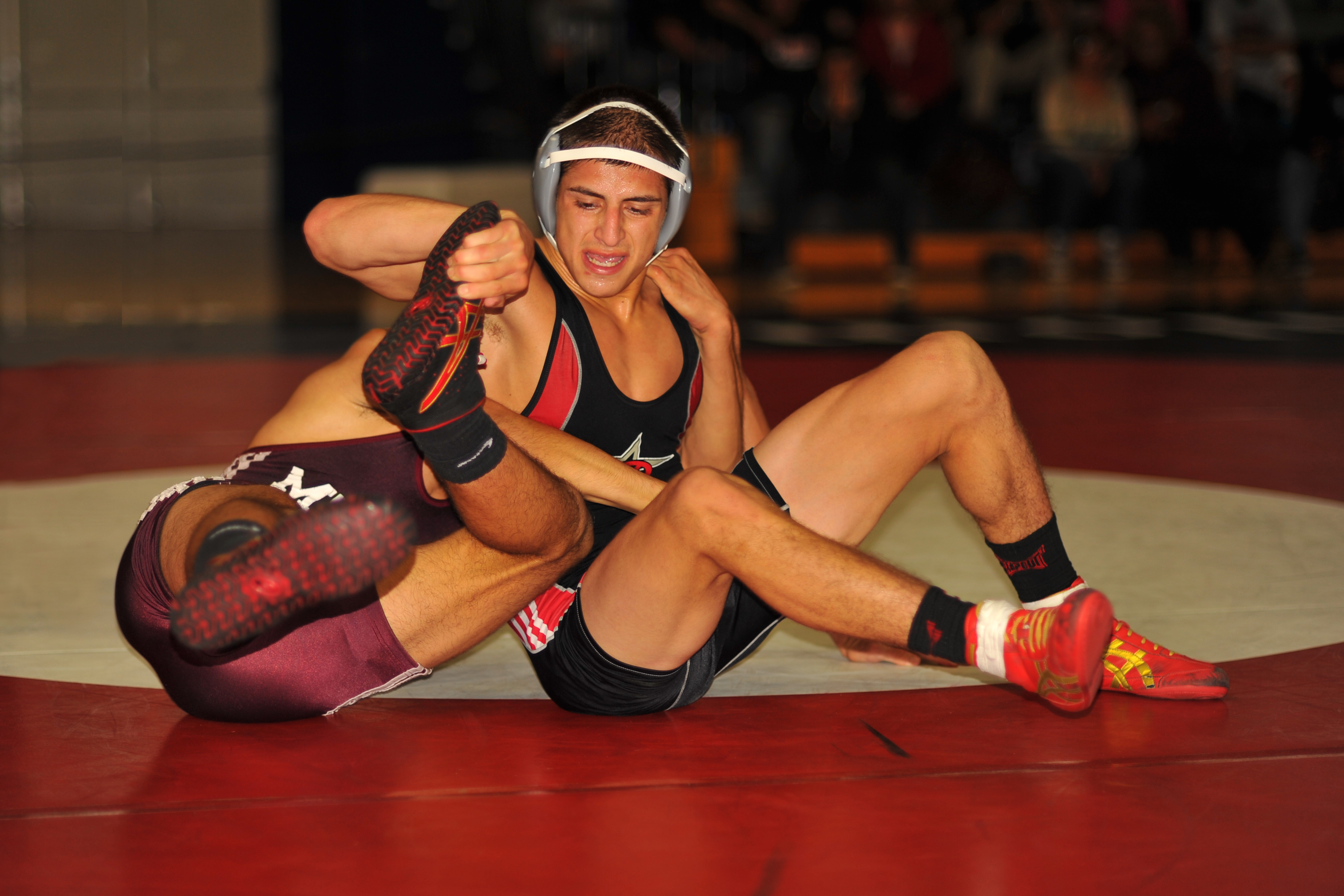
- Two college wrestlers competing in Carlsbad, California
- Focus: Grappling
- Parenthood: Ancient Greek style of wrestling
- Olympic sport: In Freestyle and Greco-Roman wrestling styles

Amateur wrestling is a variant of wrestling practiced at Olympic, collegiate, scholastic, and other levels. There are two international wrestling styles performed at the Olympic Games, freestyle and Greco-Roman, both of which are governed by the United World Wrestling (UWW).

At the middle school and high school levels in the United States, wrestlers compete in scholastic wrestling. In collegiate wrestling, there are minor differences in some scholastic wrestling rules.

The rise in the popularity of the combat sport mixed martial arts (MMA) has increased interest in amateur wrestling due to its effectiveness within the sport and its consideration as a core discipline.

== Scoring ==
Greco-Roman and freestyle differ in what holds are permitted; in Greco-Roman, the wrestlers are permitted to hold and attack only above the waist. In both Greco-Roman and freestyle, points can be scored in the following ways:

- Takedown: A wrestler gaining control over their opponent from a neutral position.
- Reversal: A wrestler gaining control over their opponent from a defensive position.
- Exposure or the Danger Position: A wrestler exposing their opponent's back to the mat, also awarded if one's back is to the mat but the wrestler is not pinned.
- Penalty: Various infractions (e.g. striking the opponent, acting with brutality or intent to injure, using illegal holds, etc.). (Under the 2004–2005 changes to the international styles, a wrestler whose opponent takes an injury time-out receives one point unless the injured wrestler is bleeding). Any wrestler stepping out of bounds while standing in the neutral position during a match is penalized by giving their opponent a point.

=== Scores only awarded in collegiate wrestling ===
As in the international styles, collegiate wrestling awards points for takedowns and reversals. Penalty points are awarded in collegiate wrestling according to the current rules, which penalize moves that would impair the life or limb of the opponent. However, the manner how infractions are penalized and points awarded to the offended wrestler differ in some aspects from the international styles. Collegiate wrestling also awards points for:

- Near Fall: This is similar to the exposure (or danger position) points given in Greco-Roman and freestyle. A wrestler scores points for holding their opponent's shoulders or scapulae to the mat for several seconds while their opponent is still not pinned.
- Time Advantage or Riding Time: On the college level, the wrestler who controlled their opponent on the mat for the most time is awarded a point; provided that the difference between the two wrestlers' time advantage is at least one minute.
- Escape: A wrestler getting from a defensive position to a neutral position. This is no longer a way to score in freestyle or Greco-Roman.

== Period format ==
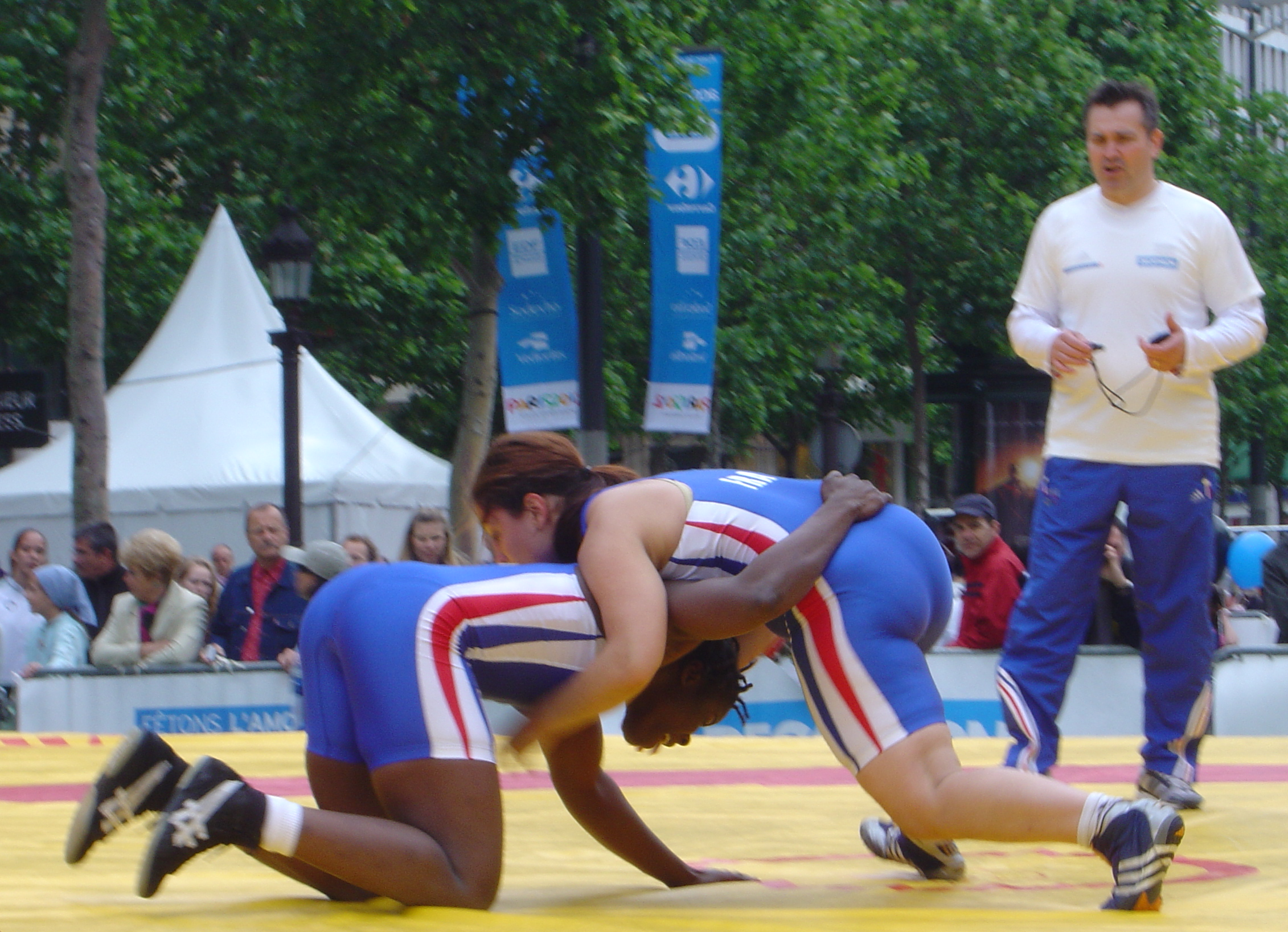
Women's freestyle wrestling

In the international styles, the format is now two three-minute periods. A wrestler wins the match when they were able to get more points than their opponent or 10 points lead in two rounds. For example, if one competitor gets a 10–0 lead in the first period, they will win by the superiority of points. Only a fall, injury default, or disqualification terminates the match; all other modes of victory result only in period termination.

This format replaced the old format of three two-minute periods played best two out of three. One side effect of the old format was that the losing wrestler could outscore the winner. For example, periods may be scored 3–2, 0–4, 1–0, leading to a total score of 4–6 but a win for the wrestler scoring fewer points.

In collegiate wrestling, the period structure is different. A college match consists of one three-minute period, followed by two two-minute periods, with an overtime round if necessary. A high school match typically consists of three two-minute periods, with an overtime round if necessary. Under the standard rules for collegiate wrestling, draws are not possible; this rule is sometimes modified for young wrestlers.

== Victory conditions in the international styles ==
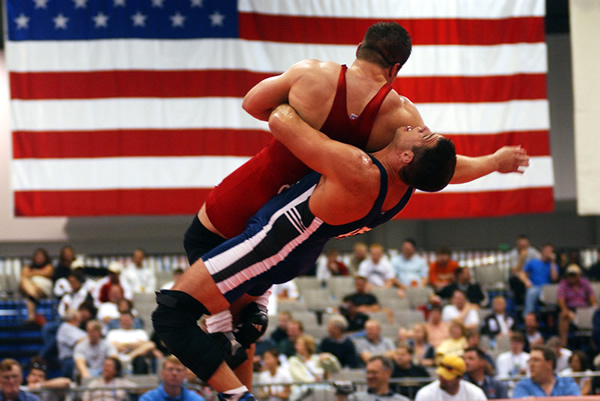
Wrestlers competing in a Greco-Roman match

A match can be won in the following ways:

- Fall: A fall, also known as a pin, occurs when one wrestler holds both of their opponent's shoulders on the mat simultaneously.
- Technical superiority: A form of mercy rule where the match is declared over when a point differential is achieved. In American folkstyle wrestling, the point difference is 15 points, in freestyle, it is 10 points, and in Greco-Roman, it is 8 points. Folkstyle terms this a technical fall and freestyle and Greco-Roman refer to it as a technical superiority.
- Decision
- Default: If one wrestler is unable to continue participating for any reason or fails to show up on the mat after their name is called three times before the match begins, their opponent is declared the winner of the match by default, forfeit, or withdrawal.
- Injury: If one wrestler is injured and unable to continue, the other wrestler is declared the winner. This is also referred to as a medical forfeit or injury default. The term also encompasses situations where wrestlers become ill, take too many injury time-outs, or bleed uncontrollably. If a wrestler is injured by their opponent's illegal maneuver and cannot continue, the wrestler at fault is disqualified.
- Disqualification: Normally, if a wrestler is assessed three Cautions for breaking the rules, they are disqualified. Under other circumstances, such as flagrant brutality, the match may be ended immediately and the wrestler disqualified and removed from the tournament.

== Victory conditions in collegiate wrestling ==
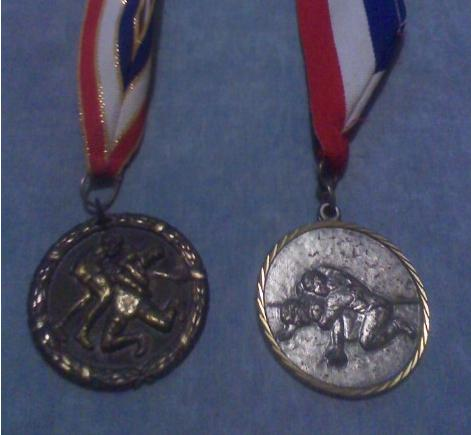
Medals awarded at a wrestling tournament

While having similar victory conditions with Greco-Roman and freestyle, such as wins by fall, decision, injury, and disqualification, victory conditions in collegiate wrestling differ on some points from the international styles:

- Fall: A fall, also known as a pin, occurs when one wrestler holds any part of both of their opponent's shoulders or both of their opponent's shoulder blades (scapulae) in continuous contact with the mat. The fall must be held in collegiate wrestling for two seconds in high school wrestling matches and one second in college wrestling matches. A win by fall is worth six team points in a dual meet.
- Technical fall: If, at any break in the action, one wrestler leads the other by 15 points and a pinning situation is not imminent, the match ends. The winning team is then usually awarded five team points. On the college level, five team points are awarded if the winner in the course of the match received points for a near fall; four team points are awarded if the wrestler did not score near-fall points.
- Major decision: In collegiate (scholastic or folkstyle) wrestling, a decision in which the winner outscores their opponent by eight or more points is a "major decision" and is rewarded with four team points in a dual meet.
- Decision: After the three wrestling periods have expired and the winning wrestler possesses a difference of one to seven in points, the wrestler is given a "decision", and the team is awarded three team points in a dual meet.
- Default: If a participant cannot continue wrestling for any reason during the match (e.g. illness, injury, etc.), their opponent wins by default, worth six team points in a dual meet.
- Disqualification: For flagrant misconduct or for a certain number of penalties assessed, a wrestler is disqualified from the match, and their opponent is declared the winner. In a dual meet, this victory is worth six team points. Rules for how penalties and disqualifications are determined to vary somewhat in collegiate wrestling from the international styles.
- Forfeit: If one wrestler fails to appear on the mat at the start of the match for some reason, and the other wrestler appears on the mat, the wrestler on the mat at the start of the match is automatically declared the winner. The winning team in a dual meet is then awarded six team points. If during the tournament, a wrestler wishes to no longer participate because of illness or injury, then their opponent wins by medical forfeit, worth the same number of individual and team tournament placement points as a forfeit.

Dual meet scoring is very similar on the high school level.

== Illegal moves ==
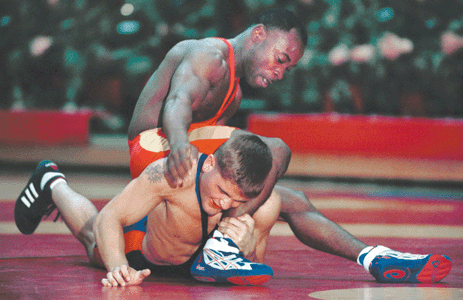
Two wrestlers grappling for position during the 2001 All-Marine Wrestle Offs

Amateur wrestling is a positionally-based form of grappling, and thus generally prohibits the following:

- Biting
- Pinching or poking with the fingers, toes, or nails, including fish-hooking the nose or mouth
- Gouging or intentionally scratching the opponent – eye-gouging especially is grounds for disqualification and banned status in most amateur wrestling competitions
- Strikes using the hands, fists, elbows, feet, knees, or head
- Joint locks, including armlocks, leglocks, spinal locks, wristlocks, and small joint manipulation
- Chokeholds, strangling, suffocating, or smothering
- Spiking, or lifting and slamming the opponent head-first to the mat (though other forms of slamming are generally allowed in the international styles; in collegiate, slamming per se is illegal)
- Grasping or holding the opponent's genitals
- Using a triangle scissors (where one knee is bent at a 90° angle and placed behind the other knee) on the head. Scissors can be used on the body or limbs, while the figure four has been made completely illegal as of 2011.
- Most types of amateur wrestling also discourage or prohibit the use of one's own or the opponent's clothing for grasping or performing any type of hold.
- Full nelson, when both arms are under both opponent's forearms or arm and both hand are behind his neck or head, although, it is now legal in Junior and Senior, if it is done to the side and the head is not bent down.

== Equipment ==
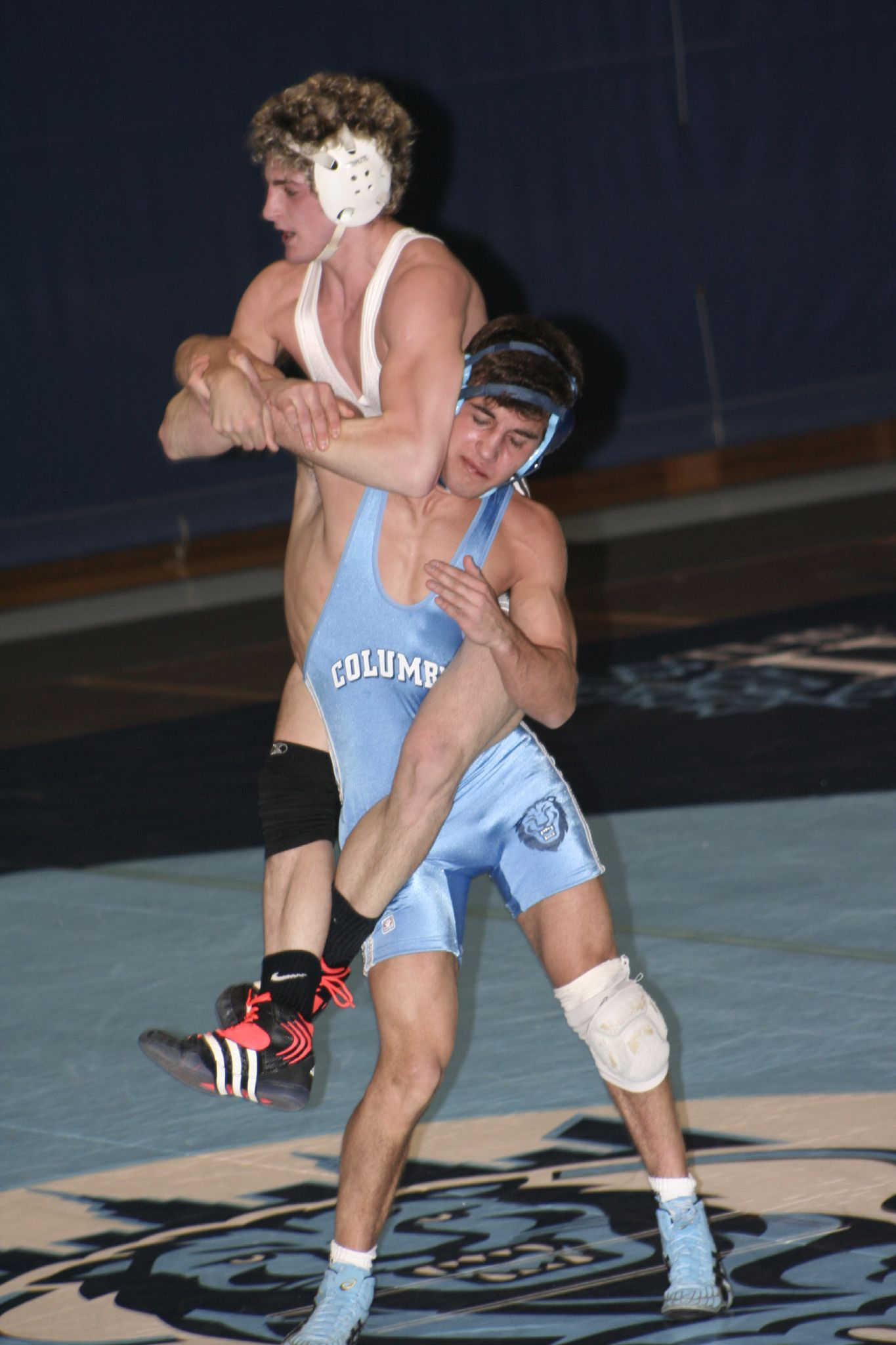
Collegiate wrestlers wearing protective headgear

While there is not much equipment that a wrestler wears, it is still highly specialized. A wrestling singlet is a one-piece, tight-fitting, colored, lycra uniform. The uniform is tight-fitting so as not to get grasped accidentally by the opponent and allows the referee to see each wrestler's body clearly when awarding points or a pin. Women wrestlers wear a higher cut singlet usually with a sports-bra underneath.

Wrestling shoes are light, flexible, thin-soled, ankle-high sneakers that allow maximum speed and traction on the mat without giving up ankle support. The current rules call for laces (if any) to be covered so that they do not come untied during competition.

In American high school and college wrestling headgear is mandatory to protect the ears from cauliflower ear and other injuries. Headgear is made from molded plastic polymer or vinyl coated energy absorbing foam over a rigid hard liner and strapped to the head tightly. In the international styles headgear is optional.

Wrestling is conducted on a padded mat that must have excellent shock absorption, tear resistance, and compression qualities. Most mats are made of PVC rubber nitrile foam. Recent advances in technology have brought about new mats made using closed cell, cross-linked polyethylene foam covered in vinyl backed with non-woven polyester.

== World participation ==
The countries with the leading wrestlers in the Olympic Games and World Championships are Iran, the United States, Russia (and some of the former Soviet Union republics, especially Armenia, Georgia, Ukraine, Uzbekistan, Azerbaijan, and Kazakhstan), Bulgaria, Turkey, Hungary, Cuba, India, Canada, Japan, Pakistan, South and North Korea, Germany, and historically Sweden and Finland.

== Women ==
=== Summer Olympics ===
Because of the successful growth in female participation, the International Olympic Committee announced that women's freestyle wrestling would be added to the Olympic games in the 2004 Summer Olympic Games in Athens, Greece with a total of four different weight classes.

=== United States ===
Until the early 1990s, the majority of women who participated in the sport had no other choice but to join the available men's teams. At the high school level, this may still be required in some areas depending on the number of wrestlers. Brookline High School in Brookline, Massachusetts was the first public school in America to create a varsity girls wrestling team. Girls have at times still competed against boys.

University of Minnesota-Morris was the first university to create a varsity women's wrestling team. UMM's head coach, Doug Reese, followed in the footsteps of other schools like Missouri Valley College that pioneered programs for female wrestlers. University of the Cumberlands, Menlo College, Pacific University, and Neosho County Community College. Cal State Bakersfield are other schools that had a number of women competitors that only competed against each other or occasionally against Canadian college teams.

As the sport continued to grow, coaches within women's wrestling formed the Women's Collegiate Wrestling Association (WCWA). This group created rules regarding eligibility, bylaws, and elected leaders for this association. Each year the number of intercollegiate programs continued to prosper with the WCWA now recognizing a total of 28 teams. Within these teams there are several who have National Collegiate Athletic Association (NCAA) affiliation and most of them are allowed to compete in the National Association of Intercollegiate Athletics (NAIA).

There is also a national dual meet championship for women's intercollegiate teams that have been sponsored by the National Wrestling Coaches Association for the past six years; the world's top 16 teams compete in this event.

In 2004, Missouri Valley College held the first Women's National Wrestling Championships which honored four individual champions. The event was later hosted by the University of the Cumberlands in 2006.

== See also ==
- Collegiate wrestling (style of wrestling)
- Freestyle wrestling (style of wrestling)
- Greco-Roman wrestling (style of wrestling)
- List of amateur wrestlers
- List of World and Olympic Champions in men's freestyle wrestling
- Scholastic wrestling (style of wrestling)
- Wrestling weight classes

== Notes ==
- International Federation of Associated Wrestling Styles (2006-12-01). "International Wrestling Rules: Greco-Roman Wrestling, Freestyle Wrestling, Women's Wrestling" (PDF). FILA. Archived from the original on 2011-06-07.
- National Collegiate Athletic Association (2008-08-01). "2009 NCAA Wrestling Rules and Interpretations" (PDF). NCAA. Archived from the original (PDF) on February 19, 2009.
- National Federation of State High School Associations (2008-08-01). 2008–09 NFHS Wrestling Rules Book. NFHS.
