= Wrestling headgear =

Head accessory worn by wrestlers for protection during matches

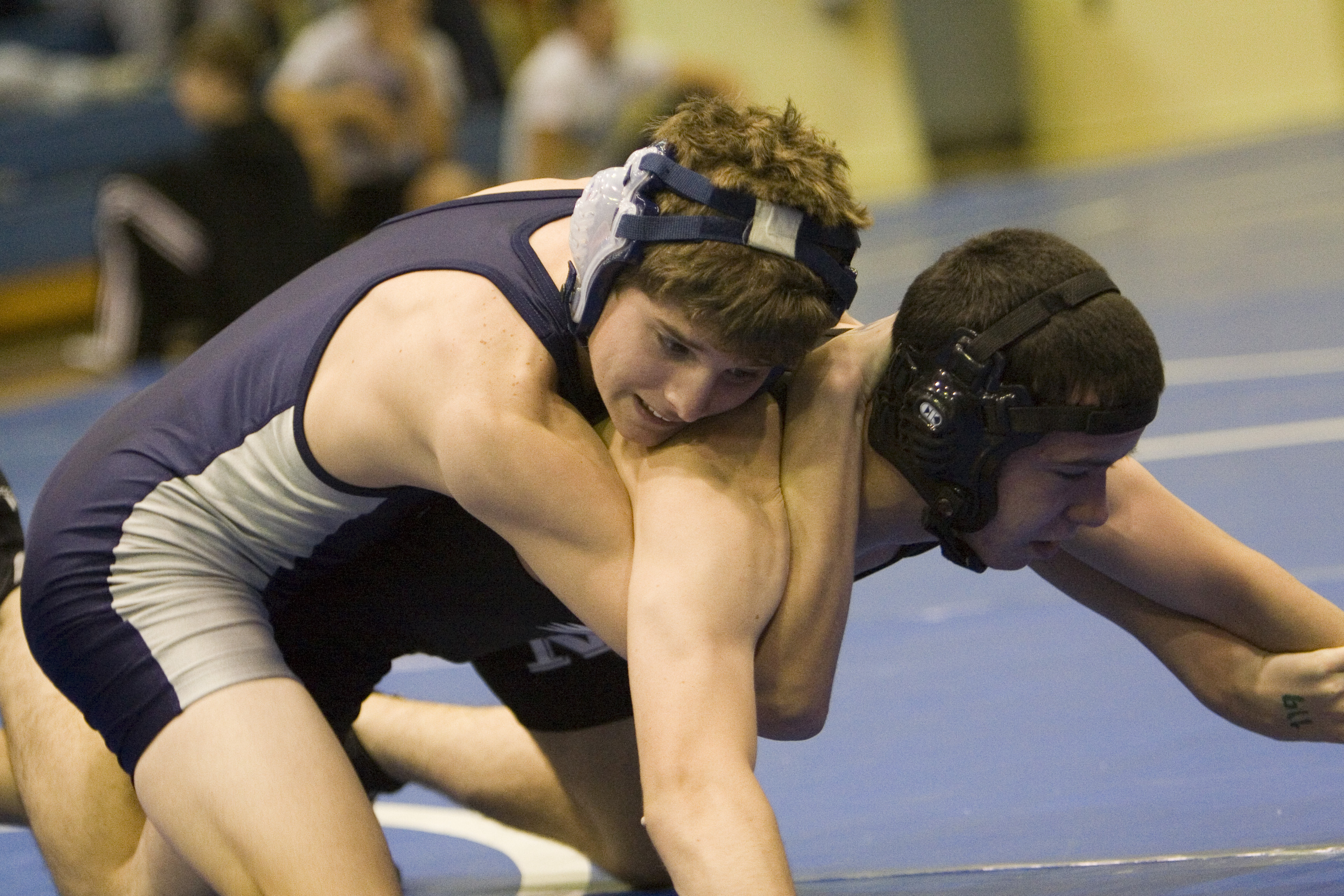
The two scholastic wrestlers seen here in a high school match, are wearing protective headgear.

Wrestling headgear is protection that a person wears over the ears and chin during wrestling matches.

== Description ==
The main purpose of headgear is to protect the ears of the wrestler, not really the head as the name implies. Thus, wrestling headgear equipment are also simply called ear guards or ear protectors. The headgear often covers the ears of the wearer, has two straps that go behind the head, two that go over the front and top part of the head, and one strap that goes under the chin (in some cases the strap will go on the chin). Headgear is often made of durable plastic, velcro, and button snaps.

== Reason ==
Wrestling headgear is made to protect the wearer from long term injury. The constant bashing and beating on a wrestler's ears that comes from not wearing headgear can cause blood vessels in the ears to burst. These types of injuries do not cause any external bleeding; however incredibly painful sacs of blood will start to develop in the ears often resulting in permanent disfiguration of the ears. This condition is known as cauliflower ear. Treatment of cauliflower ear requires the wrestler see a doctor who will then drain the blood out of the ear via a needle. A wrestler may need to see a plastic surgeon to repair and/or treat a Cauliflower ear.

== Mandatory or optional use ==
Headgear is required to be worn in high school and college wrestling in the United States. In Canada, and in international competition (freestyle and Greco-Roman), headgear is allowed but not required.

In some cases, if a wrestler has face problems, like a history of broken noses or wrestles with stitches on the face, he or she may also have the option of wearing a face mask attached to the headgear. In the USA, a wrestler must have a note from a doctor saying the face mask is required. Since an opposing coach is able to ask for this documentation before each match, it is important for athletes to carry it with them regularly.

In the past in the Senior Level, Olympics, and World Championships, a wrestler could protest and their opponent would have to remove their headgear. This is no longer the case and a wrestler is allowed to wear a headgear even if their opponent protests.

== See also ==
- Wrestling singlet
- Wrestling shoes
- Amateur wrestling
- Collegiate wrestling
- Freestyle wrestling
