= List of karateka =

List of karateka includes notable practitioners of karate, listed in alphabetical order by surname. Note that Japanese name order might not be consistent in this list, due to differing conventions. Individual entries list each person's name, years of birth and death (as appropriate), and main karate style(s).

== A ==
- Keigo Abe (born 1938), Shotokan
- Rafael Aghayev (born 1985), Shotokan
- Gary Alexander, Isshin Ryu
- Seishō Arakaki (1840–1918), Tode
- Steve Arneil (born 1934), Kyokushin
- Mark Arnott (born 1950), American Kenpo
- Tetsuhiko Asai (1935–2006), Shotokan
- Ankō Asato (1827–1906), Shuri-te
- Linden Ashby (born 1960), style unspecified
- Hideyuki Ashihara (1944–1995), Kyokushin and Ashihara
- Elisa Au (born 1981), Shitō-ryū
- Akshay Kumar (born 1967), Gōjū-ryū

== B ==
- Xhavit Bajrami (born 1975), Seido
- Shaun Baker, Shotokan
- Christine Bannon-Rodrigues (born 1966) Oki-ryu
- Vitor Belfort (born 1977), Shotokan
- Steven Bellamy (born 1950), Wadō-ryū and Gōjū-ryū
- Randy Blake (born 1986), style unspecified
- Billy Blanks (born 1955), style unspecified
- Jon Bluming (1933–2018), Kyokushin
- Mitchell Bobrow (born 1950), Shūdōkan, Tang Soo Do
- Robert Bowles, Shuri-ryū
- Frank Brennan (born 1960), Shotokan
- Steve Blackman (born 1963), Shotokan
- Jerry Bell (born 1953), Shotokan

== C ==
- Jose Canseco (born 1964), style unspecified
- Thomas Carroll (1938–1999), Shotokan
- Shonie Carter (born 1971), Shidōkan
- Antonio Carvalho (born 1979), Shotokan
- Graciela Casillas, American Kenpo
- Juan Eduardo Castro dos Santos (born 1954), Okinawa-ken Ryu
- Tino Ceberano (born c. 1942), Gōjū Kai
- Nicholas Raymond Cerio (1936–1998), American Kenpo
- Sonny Chiba (born 1939), Kyokushin
- Chōshin Chibana (1885–1969), Shōrin-ryū
- Teruo Chinen (born 1941), Gōjū-ryū
- Peter Chong (born 1941), Kyokushin
- William Kwai Sun Chow (1914–1987), American Kenpo
- Randall "Tex" Cobb (born 1950), style unspecified
- Howard Collins (born 1949), Kyokushin
- Dale Cook (born 1958), style unspecified
- Harry Cook (born 1949), Shotokan and Gōjū-ryū
- John Corcoran, Shōrin-ryū
- Joe Corley (born 1947), style unspecified
- John Critzos II, style unspecified
- Sean Connery (1930–2020), Kyokushin

== D ==
- Raymond Daniels (born 1980), Kenpō Karate, Shotokan
- Count Dante (1939–1975), style unspecified
- Fumio Demura (born 1938), Shitō-ryū
- Nick Denis (born 1983), Kyokushin
- George Dillman, Ryukyu Kempo
- Richard K. Diran (born 1949), style unspecified
- Ticky Donovan (born 1947), Shotokan, Wadō-ryū, and Kyokushin
- Troy Dorsey (born 1962), style unspecified

== E ==
- Héctor Echavarría (born 1969), American Kenpo and Shuri-ryū
- Shigeru Egami (1912–1981), Shōtōkai
- Adriano Directo Emperado (1926–2009), American Kenpo
- Keinosuke Enoeda (1935–2003), Shotokan

== F ==
- Glaube Feitosa (born 1973), Kyokushin
- Francisco Filho (born 1971), Kyokushin
- Sean Patrick Flanery (born 1965), style unspecified
- Michael G. Foster (born 1940), Yoshukai
- Jason David Frank (born 1973), Shotokan
- Zane Frazier (born 1966), American Kenpo
- Travis Fulton (1977–2021), American Kenpo
- Gichin Funakoshi (1869–1957), Shotokan
- Gigō Funakoshi (1906–1945), Shotokan

== G ==
- Manny Gamburyan (born 1981), Kyokushin
- Alexander Gerunov (born 1979), Shitō-ryū
- John Giordano (martial artist), Gōjū-ryū
- Glacier (born 1964), style unspecified
- Lyman Good (born 1985), style unspecified
- Peter Graham (born 1975), Kyokushin
- Thomas Ian Griffith (born 1962), American Kenpo
- Sam Greco (born 1967), Kyokushin
- Neil Grove (born 1971), Gōjū-ryū
- Shinpan Gusukuma (1890–1954), Shitō-ryū
- Bear Grylls (born 1974), Shotokan
- Johnny Gyro, style unspecified

== H ==
- Keith Hackney (born 1958), American Kenpo
- Mitsusuke Harada (born 1928), Shotokan
- Randall Hassell (born c. 1940), Shotokan
- Demetrius Havanas (1950–1981), style unspecified
- Dave Hazard (born 1952), Shotokan
- Dana Hee (born 1961), Shotokan
- Sekō Higa (1898–1966), Gōjū-ryū
- Yuchoku Higa (1910–1994), Shōrin-ryū and Gōjū-ryū
- Kanryō Higaonna (1853–1915), Gōjū-ryū
- Kanryu Higaonna (1849–1922), Okinawan martial arts
- Morio Higaonna (born 1938), Gōjū-ryū
- Kori Hisataka (1907–1988), Shorinjiryu Kenkokan
- Masayuki Hisataka (born 1940), Shorinjiryu Kenkokan
- Steven Ho (born 1973), style unspecified
- Sam Hoger (born 1980), style unspecified
- Russ Hogue (born 1974), style unspecified
- Loek Hollander (born c. 1940), Kyokushin
- Kyoji Horiguchi (born 1990), Shotokan
- Andy Hug (1964–2000), Kyokushin and Seido

== I ==
- Kazuyoshi Ishii (born 1953), Seido
- Ankō Itosu (1832–1916), Shuri-te

== K ==
- Nobuaki Kakuda (born 1961), Seido
- Hirokazu Kanazawa (1931–2019), Shotokan
- Taiji Kase (1929–2004), Shotokan
- Hajime Kazumi (born 1971), Kyokushin
- Ömer Kemaloğlu (born 1987), style unspecified
- Katsunori Kikuno (born 1981), Kyokushin
- Richard Kim (1917–2001), Shōrinji-ryū
- Davit Kiria (born 1988), Ashihara
- Kishi Nobuyuki (1948–2018), Kyokushin and Kishi Karate
- Taishin Kohiruimaki (born 1977), Kyokushin
- Yuki Kondo (born 1975), Shorinji Kempo
- Takayuki Kubota (1934–2024), Te and Gosoku-ryu
- Shōgō Kuniba (1935–1992), Shitō-ryū
- Yasuaki Kurata (born 1946), Shito-ryu
- Chōtoku Kyan (1870–1945), Shōrin-ryū

== L ==
- Maximiliano Larrosa (born 1992)
- Joe Lewis (born 1944), Shōrin-ryū
- Chuck Liddell (born 1969), American Kenpo
- Bobby Lowe (1929–2011), Kyokushin
- Dolph Lundgren (born 1957), Kyokushin

== M ==
- Kenwa Mabuni (1889–1952), Shitō-ryū
- Lyoto Machida (born 1978), Shotokan
- John Makdessi (born 1985), Shotokan
- Akira Masuda (born 1962), Kyokushin
- Shokei Matsui (born 1963), Kyokushin
- Sōkon Matsumura (c. 1800 – c. 1890), Shuri-te
- Kenji Midori (born 1962), Kyokushin
- Takayuki Mikami (born 1933), Shotokan
- Miyuki Miura (born 1949), Shotokan and Kyokushin
- Frank Mir (born 1979), Kenpō
- Chōjun Miyagi (1888–1953), Gōjū-ryū
- Katsuya Miyahira (born 1918), Shōrin-ryū Shidōkan
- Ei'ichi Miyazato (1922–1999), Gōjū-ryū
- Minoru Mochizuki (1907–2003), Shotokan and Yoseikan
- Vic Moore (born 1943), Shuri-ryū
- Chōki Motobu (1871–1944), Shuri-te
- Chōyū Motobu (1857–1938), Shuri-te
- Matt Mullins (born 1980), Shōrei-ryū
- Musashi (Akio Mori, born 1972), Seido
- Glen Murphy (Born 1957) Kyokushin

== N ==
- Shōshin Nagamine (1907–1997), Shōrin-ryū and Matsubayashi-ryū
- Don Nagle (1938–1999), Isshin-ryu
- Tatsuya Naka (born 1964), Shotokan
- Masatoshi Nakayama (1913–1987), Shotokan
- Shūgorō Nakazato (born 1921), Shōrin-ryū Shōrinkan
- Jadamba Narantungalag (born (1975), Kyokushin
- Gunnar Nelson (born 1988), Gōjū-ryū
- Alain Ngalani (born 1975), Kyokushin
- Jōkō Ninomiya (born 1954), Enshin
- Hidetaka Nishiyama (1928–2008), Shotokan
- Masaaki Noiri (born 1993), Shin
- Chuck Norris (1940–2026), Tang Soo Do

== O ==
- Hideo Ochi (born 1940), Shotokan
- Tsutomu Ohshima (born 1930), Shotokan
- Teruyuki Okazaki (born 1931), Shotokan
- Terry O'Neill (born 1948), Shotokan
- Hironori Ōtsuka (1892–1982), Wadō-ryū
- Masutatsu Ōyama (1923–1994), Kyokushin

== P ==
- Ed Parker (1931–1990), American Kenpo
- Cecil Patterson (1930–2002), Wadō-ryū
- Seth Petruzelli (born 1979), Shitō-ryū
- Nicholas Pettas (born 1973), Kyokushin
- Malcolm Phipps (born 1942), Shotokan
- Henry Plée (born 1923)
- Karin Prinsloo (born 1972), JKA Shotokan

== R ==
- Samuel Roberts (born 1956), Shotokan
- Hatsuo Royama (born 1948), Kyokushin
- Bas Rutten (born 1965), Kyokushin

== S ==
- Tarec Saffiedine (born 1986), Shihaishinkai
- Georges St-Pierre (born 1981), Kyokushin
- Kanga Sakukawa (1733–1815), Te
- Masaaki Satake (born 1965), Seido
- Katsuaki Satō (born 1946), Satojuku
- Semmy Schilt (born 1973), Ashihara
- Andy Sherry (born 1943), Shotokan
- Tatsuo Shimabuku (1908–1975), Gōjū-ryū and Isshin-ryū
- Zenryō Shimabukuro (1908–1969), Shōrin-ryū Seibukan
- Hiroshi Shirai (born 1937), Shotokan
- Assuério Silva (born 1974), Shotokan
- Wesley Snipes (born 1962), Shotokan
- Tiffany van Soest (born 1989), Shōrin-ryū
- Paul Starling (born 1948), Gōjū-ryū
- Shojiro Sugiyama (born 1929), Shotokan

== T ==
- Kazumi Tabata (born 1943), Shotokan
- Seigo Tada (1922–1997), Gōjū-ryū and Seigokan
- Masaji Taira (born 1952), Gōjū-ryū
- Peichin Takahara (1683–c. 1765), Te
- Rina Takeda (born 1991), Ryukyu Shorin-ryu
- Chōjirō Tani (1921–1998), Shūkōkai
- Ewerton Teixeira (born 1982), Kyokushin
- George Spiro Thanos (born 1952), Taekwondo
- Geoff Thompson (born 1960), Shotokan
- Stephen Thompson (born 1983), American Kenpo
- Seikichi Toguchi (1917–1998), Gōjū-ryū
- Kenji Tokitsu (born 1947), Shotokan
- Kanken Tōyama (1888–1966), Shūdōkan
- Robert Trias (1923–1989), Shuri-ryū
- Masami Tsuruoka (born 1929), Chitō-ryū
- Ashraf Tai, (career 1974–1985) Shotokan

== U ==
- Kanbun Uechi (1877–1948), Uechi-ryū
- Sadamu Uriu (born 1929), Shotokan

== V ==
- Luca Valdesi (born 1976), Shotokan
- Dominique Valera (born 1947), Shotokan
- Jean-Claude Van Damme (born 1960), Shotokan
- Will Vanders (born 1963), Kyokushin and Shotokan

== W ==
- Atsuko Wakai (born 1971), Seigokan and Gōjū-ryū
- Bill Wallace (born 1945), Shōrin-ryū
- Shunji Watanabe (born 1938), Shorinjiryu Kenkokan
- John van Weenen (born 1941), Shotokan
- Michael Jai White (born 1967), Kyokushin, Shotokan, and Gōjū-ryū
- Arturo Worrell (born 1950), Shotokan
- Ronnie Watt (born 1947), Shotokan

== Y ==
- James Yabe (born 1941), Shotokan
- Kentsū Yabu (1866–1937), Shōrin-ryū
- Meitoku Yagi (1912–2003), Gōjū-ryū
- Yutaka Yaguchi (born 1932), Shotokan
- Gōgen Yamaguchi (1909–1989), Gōjū Kai
- Masahiro Yamamoto (born 1983), Kyokushin
- Tadashi Yamashita (born 1942), Shorin-Ryu
- Terutomo Yamazaki (born 1947), Kyokushin
- Tony Young (born 1962), Gōjū-ryū
