= Shubukan Shōrin-ryu =

Style of Okinawan karate

Shōrin-ryū Shubukan
- Date founded: 1973
- Country of origin: Okinawa, Japan
- Founder: Jōki Uema
- Current head: Takeshi Uema
- Arts taught: Karate
- Ancestor schools: Shuri-te; Kobayashi Shorin-ryū; Yamanni ryu

Shorin-ryu Shubukan (小林流守武館, Shōrin-ryū Shubukan) is a branch of the Kobayashi Shōrin-ryū style of Okinawan karate, developed by Jōki Uema, Hanshi 10th Dan.

== History ==
Uema was a student of Chōshin Chibana, Chōtoku Kyan, Shinpan Gusukuma, Shimabukuro Taro, Uezato Chuei, and Ōshiro Chōjo. Following the death of his primary teacher Chibana, in 1973, he would go on to found his own dojo named Shubukan and in 1976 it was officially recognized by the Okinawa Kobayashi-ryu Karate Association. The name Shubukan is derived from three kanji: shu (to protect), bu (the military/martial thing), and kan (residence/hall). It is interpreted as meaning a place where one learns to protect—not just people, but also the historical knowledge of the past and the spirit of mutual understanding between practitioners. Following the death of Joki in 2011 leadership of Shubukan was taken by his son Yasuhiro Uema. Yasuhiro primarily trained under his father Joki but also under Chozo Nakama, Seitoku Ishikawa, and China Teikichi.Following the death of Yasuhiro in 2025 his son and Joki's grandson Takeshi Uema would be named the third generation head.

== Karate Kata of Shubukan ==
Shubukan is well known for its large collection of Kata which include 54 karate kata and 47 kobudo kata representing the preservation of the Founder Joki Uema's teachings.

The following is a list of the 54 karate kata.

- Fukyugata
  - Ichi
  - Ni
  - San
- Kihon
  - Shodan
  - Nidan
  - Sandan
  - Yondan
  - Godan
- Naihanchi
  - Shodan
  - Nidan
  - Sandan
- Pinan
  - Shodan
  - Nidan
  - Sandan
  - Yondan
  - Godan
  - Godan Ni
- Passai
  - Itosu
  - Matsumura
  - Oyadomari
  - Kiyuna
  - Gusukuma
  - Asato
  - Ishimine
- Kusanku
  - Sho
  - Dai
  - Chatanyara
- Chinto
  - Tomari
- Ananku
- Annan
- Wankan
- Chinte
- Jion
- Jitte
- Jiin
- Sōchin
- Niseishi
- Seisan
- Unsū
- Rōhai
  - Itosu Shodan
  - Itosu Nidan
  - Itosu Sandan
  - Tomari
- Wanshū
  - Tomari
  - Tomari Dai
  - Tomari Koryu
  - Itosu
- Gojūshiho
  - Yabu
- Hakutsuru
- Shubu no Te
- Shuri Sanchin
- Nunfa

== Kobudo Kata of Shubukan ==
This Katas was taught by Uezato Chuei

Bō

- Tsukenbo I
- Tsukenbo II
- Tenryu no Kon
- Shushi no Kon Koryu
- Shushi no Kon Sho
- Shushi no Kon Dai
- Sakugawa no Kon Sho
- Sakugawa no Kon Chu
- Sakugawa no Kon Dai
- Sakugawa no Kon Koryu
- Sunakake no Kon
- Oshiro no Kon
- Urasoe no Kon
- Soeishi no Kon Sho
- Soeishi no Kon Dai
- Chatanyara no Kon
- Sesoko no Kon
- Shirotaru no Kon Sho
- Shitotaru no Kon Dai
- Choun no Kon
- Shikiyanaka no Kon
- Chieneshikiyanaka no Kon
- Shubu no Kon

Sai

- Matsumura no Sai I
- Matsumura no Sai II
- Yakaa no Sai
- Hamahiga no Sai
- Tsukenshitahaku no Sai
- Hantagawa no Sai
- Kojo no Sanbon Sai
- Shubu no Sai
- Ishikawagwa no Sai

Kama

- Tayama no Nichogama
- Kanegawa no Nichogama Sho
- Kanegawa no Nichogama Dai
- Shubu no Nichogama

Gusan

- Uesatoguwa no Gusan

Eku

- Uesatoguwa no Eku

Tonfa

- Yaraguwa no Tonfa

Nunchaku

- Maezato no Nunchaku
- Shubu no Nunchaku

Tinbe

- Shubu no Tinbe

Yari

- Shubu no Yari

== Ranks ==
These are the ten beginner or Kyū ranks, which in traditional practice count down from 10 to 1. The white, blue, green, and brown belts are standard. Different schools in the organization may have different designations of the intermediate ranks, such as different belt colors and stripes:

1. 10º Jukyū (White Belt)
2. 9º Kyukyū (Orange Belt)
3. 8º Hachikyū (Orange Belt)
4. 7º Shichikyū (Blue Belt)
5. 6º Rokkyū (Blue Belt)
6. 5º Gokyū (Green Belt)
7. 4º Yonkyū (Green Belt)
8. 3º Sankyū (Brown Belt)
9. 2º Nikyū (Brown Belt)
10. 1º Ikkyū (Brown Belt)

These are the ten black belt or Dan grades:

1. Shodan (1st degree | Regular Black belt)
2. Nidan (2nd degree)
3. Sandan (3rd degree)
4. Yondan (4th degree)
5. Godan (5th degree)
6. Rokudan (6th degree) (Master's title: Renshi; Black belt; Red & White Belt)
7. Nanadan (7th degree) (Master's title: Kyōshi; Black belt; Red & White Belt)
8. Hachidan (8th degree) (Master's title: Kyōshi; Black belt; Red & White Belt)
9. Kyūdan (9th degree) (Master's title: Hanshi; Black belt; Red Belt)
10. Jūdan (10th degree) (Master's title: Hanshi; Black belt; Red Belt)
