= Chōmo Hanashiro =

Okinawan karateka (1869–1945)

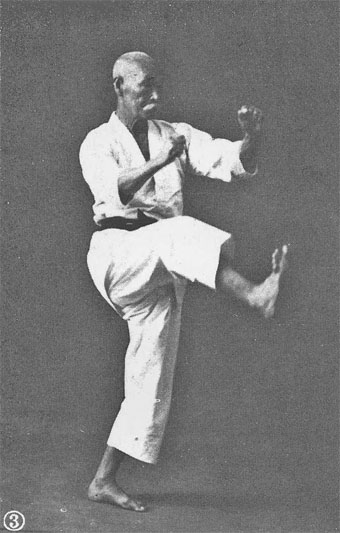
- Hanashiro c. 1938
- Born: 1869; Shuri, Okinawa, Ryukyu Kingdom
- Died: 1945 (aged 75–76); Okinawa, Japan
- Native name: 花城 長茂
- Style: Shōrin-ryū, Karate
- Teachers: Matsumura Sokon,Ankō Itosu

Other information
- Notable students: Nakandakari Kanzo, Kinjo Hiroshi, Ankichi Arakaki, Shigeru Nakamura, Tsuyoshi Chitose, Nakama Chozo, Shimabukuro Zenryō

Chōmo Hanashiro (花城 長茂, Hanashiro Chōmo; Okinawan: Hanagusuku Chomu; 1869–1945) was an Okinawan martial arts master who is notable for aiding in the evolution of Shōrin-ryū karate. Early in his childhood, he became a student of the renowned master Matsumura Sōkon, of the Shuri-te style. In addition to being a recognized expert in martial arts, Hanashiro was the first to formally use the kanji kara (空) instead of "to" or "tang" (唐), a term by which Okinawa's martial art became known: "karate".

== Biography ==
Chōmo Hanashiro was born in Shuri. He started karate practice at a very young age under Sōkon Matsumura(c. 1809 – c. 1899). Hanashiro later on became Itosu's assistant and remained so until his Itosu's death in 1915. Unlike Matsumura, Itosu aimed to promote karate as a modality of physical and social development in the public school system of Okinawa, influenced by Hanashiro.

Along with Yabu Kentsu he was among the first Okinawans to enlist in the Japanese military, when, due to diffidence towards the former Ryukyuans, there was no mandatory conscription. He participated in the Russo-Japanese War.

His experience in military training influenced the karate he taught at the middle and normal schools. He was among the first to introduce formalities such as standing in line of seniority, bowing before and after training and what is today known as yakusoku kumite.

Hanashiro was the first person to use the term "karate" in his personal writings dating from 1905. He voluntarily replaced the old ideogram of to/tang (唐), by that of kara (空), because of their phonetic similarity, to slightly modify the meaning of the term. Kara-te = "empty" hand, means. On October 25, 1936, Hanashiro also participated, in the assembly of the "Great Masters of Okinawa Karate", where he advocated and obtained the official adoption of the term "Karate" ("Empty Hand").

In the early quarter of the twentieth century, Hanashiro was recognized as a great expert in karate, still pioneering the teaching of martial art in the indigenous educational system in Okinawa. In addition to the technical contributions, the use of the word «karate» was used to describe his martial art, in the 1905 publication «Karate Kumite», when he formally abandoned the use of kanji (唐) by (空). Both may sound like "tang", but the latter also means empty and leaves the reference to the Sinic Dynasty somewhat more distant.

Hanashiro died in 1945, during World War II bombardments by the American military on Okinawa. These bombings caused 60,000 civilian casualties in 82 days.

His most eminent disciples were Shigeru Nakamura (1892–1969),dr. Chitōse (1898–1984), (founder of Chitō-ryū, not to be confused with Kenwa Mabuni's Shitō-ryū), Nakama Chōzo (1899–1982), who later became a disciple of Choshin Chibana, Shimabukuro Zenryō (1904–1969), founder of the Shōrin-ryū Seibukan"Seibukan Shōrin-ryū school) and Kinjō Hiroshi (1919–2013).
