= Shōrin-ryū Kyudōkan =

Style of karate

Kyudokan (Shorin-ryu)
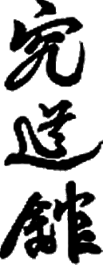
- Official logo
- Date founded: 1947
- Country of origin: Okinawa, Japan
- Founder: Yuchoku Higa
- Arts taught: Karate
- Ancestor schools: Naha-te, Shuri-te, Shōrin-ryū

The Okinawa Shōrin-ryū Karate-dō Kyudōkan Association (沖縄小林流空手道究道館連合会) is one of the seven branches of Kobayashi Shōrin-ryū style of Okinawan karate, developed by Yuchoku Higa, Hanshi 10th Dan.

The association has supported the registration of Okinawa traditional karate as UNESCO World Heritage Site.

== History ==
In 1947 Higa Yuchoku inaugurated the Kyudokan Karate dojo and applied himself to perfecting and developing everything that he had learned from his masters, and especially from Chōshin Chibana, with whom he continued to practice.

In 1961 the first Shorinryu Karate-do Association of Okinawa was formed. It was presided over by Chibana and Higa Yuchoku was assigned the role of vice-president.

By 2015, the Kyudokan School had branches in 29 countries and had more than 10,000 students around the world. Branches of the school were established in South America by Benito Higa and in the world by Oscar Higa. Now Hanshi 10th Dan Oscar Masato Higa heads the World Shorin Ryu KYUDOKAN HIGA-TE Karate-Do Federation and Representative for the world.

Minoru Higa (10th Dan) is the current President (Kaichou) and Soke of Okinawa Shorin Ryu Kyudokan Karate-Do Association principally based in Okinawa.

Some non-Japanese have studied with Master Minoru Higa in a very regular way and they teach in their country. In Argentina, Master Pedro Fattore was a great representative of the central dojo of Okinawa, today in Argentina it is Mario Ramundo the representative.

In Europe, Patrick Rault from France 8th dan Kyudokan from Okinawa federation and federal expert 8th dan of the French federation FFK, he is the official all France representative from Sept 18th 2008 and teaches in many other countries. He has lived 15 years in Japan and taught Karate in Japan for more than 10 years. He was appointed in 2014 by the prefecture of Okinawa civil ambassador.

== Characteristics ==
- The Myo Mamoru principle, namely the concept of defending and protecting (sheltering) the body;
- Development of Ki (energy) by means of systematic Hara (tandem) work and the principles of yin and yang: hard-soft relaxed-tensed slow-rapid;
- The rule of Kokyu (breathing);
- The Marumi-Muchimi principle, namely circularity of movement and the conclusion of the technique at its maximum level.

== Kata ==
Below is a list of all kata practiced in Kyudokan schools.

- Fukyugata Ichi
- Fukyugata Ni
- Pinan Shodan
- Pinan Nidan
- Pinan Sandan
- Pinan Yondan
- Pinan Godan
- Naihanchi Shodan
- Naihanchi Nidan
- Naihanchi Sandan
- Unsu
- Jion
- Jitte
- Passai Sho
- Passai Dai
- Kushanku Sho
- Kushanku Dai
- Seisan
- Chintō
- Chinti
- Sōchin
- Gojūshiho
