= Seiichi Iju =

Okinawan karateka

- Born: Japan
- Died: Japan
- Other names: Selichl Ishu
- Style: Shitō-ryū
- Teacher: Shinpan Gusukuma

Other information
- Notable students: Shūgorō Nakazato

Seiichi Iju (伊集 盛一, Iju Seiichi), also known as Selichl Ishu, was an Okinawan martial artist. He studied Shitō-ryū karate as a student of Shinpan Gusukuma. Iju had a dojo in Osaka, Japan. He was the first teacher of Shūgorō Nakazato (from 1935 to 1940), who then went on to become a student of Chosin Chibana. The version of Gojūshiho kata practiced in Shōrin-ryū Shorinkan is credited to Iju and his lineage. The rest of Shōrin-ryū Shorinkan katas are derived from Chosin Chibana's lineage.
