= Minoru Higa =

Japanese karateka

- Born: September 18, 1941 (age 84); Naha, USCAR (now Naha, Okinawa, Japan)
- Style: Shorin-ryu
- Teachers: Yuchoku Higa, Yogen Tamashiro, Yokomoto Isekichi
- Rank: Hanshi 10th Dan, Kaicho of Kyudokan

Minoru Higa (born September 18, 1941) is the Kaicho or federation president and Grandmaster of the Kyudokan School of Shorin-ryū. His efforts, along with that of his family, have made Kyudokan popular outside Okinawa.

== Early life ==
Master Minoru Higa 10th dan, nephew of Yuchoku Higa and Jintatsu Higa, was born in Naha, Okinawa on September 18, 1941. His first experience of martial arts (Judo) was at the age of 11, under the guidance of Yogen Tamashiro. In 1960 he became the pupil of the Yokomoto Isekichi and began practicing karate with his uncle Yuchoku Higa.

The same year he enrolled in the Japan Bodybuilding Center, driven by his passion for weight-training. From 1960 onwards Minoru Higa attended the famous temple of judo, the "Kodokan", attaining the grade of 4th Dan in this discipline.

His physique, which he developed through weight-training and intense practice of judo and karate, helped Higa to become the university boxing champion.

In 1964, he graduated in Business and Economics.

== Karate life and Spread of the Kyudokan ==
Following a special invitation in 1969, Minoru Higa put on a display at the Tokyo Budokan, for the Japanese Karate Championships; in 1971 he opened his gymnasium, the Naha Bodybuilding Center (today known as "Naha Gym"), whilst continuing his karate training under the guidance of his uncle Yuchoku Higa, at the Kyudokan Hombu Dojo.

In 1976, he became a member of the Ryukyu Kobudo Ryu Kon Kai, presided over by Kotaro Iha.

In 1977, together with his teacher Yuchoku Higa, he was invited to visit Argentina by the Shorin Ryu Kyudokan Federation (presided over by Jintatsu Higa), of that country for the Argentinian championships of Okinawa Kyudokan karate-do. During this period, some of the displays put on together with Yuchoku Higa, Jintatsu Higa, Oscar Higa and Benito Higa helped spread the name of the Higa family school.

== Presidency of the Kyudokan ==
As he was Vice-President of the Okinawa Kyudokan karate-do Federation, Minoru Higa decided to devote himself more fully to the growth of the school, and following the death of Yuchoku Higa, he himself became president of the World Okinawan Shōrin-ryū Kyudokan karate-do Federation, an office he holds to this day.

As well as being a entrepreneur and representative of the Kyudokan school, Minoru Higa is a committee-member for the Okinawan Karatedo and Kobudo Federation, vice-president of the Ryukyu Kobudo Ryu Kon Kai Association, chief committee-member of the Okinawa Bodybuilding Association, a member and referee for the Japanese Bodybuilding Federation, and a member and referee for the Japanese Powerlifting Association.

Master Higa is president of the World Federation of Kyudokan Dojos and a member of the Okinawan Karate and Kobudo Federation Committee. He is also vice-president of one of the four Okinawan Karate and Kobudo federations (a merger within a single structure is being considered). Master Higa also holds various positions within the bodybuilding and weightlifting federations. Master Higa Minoru has linked his life to Karate. He lives in Okinawa, at the roots of this discipline, which he guides all his sports practices. Humble, open, and a teacher, he nevertheless has a realistic eye on the evolution of his discipline and the role it should play in the daily life and personal development of each person. Both wise and a fighter, he seems very close to the dream sensei as popularized in cinema. A master among masters, Higa Minoru is an example from which many should draw inspiration.
