= Ahagon Naonobu =

Okinawan Martial artist

- Born: 11 February 1940; Naha, Okinawa, Japan
- Style: Shorin-ryū
- Teachers: Chibana Chōshin, Shūgorō Nakazato
- Rank: Hanshi, 10th Dan

Naonobu Ahagon (born 11 February 1940) is an Okinawan martial artist, training and teaching Shorin-ryu Karate-do. In 1991, he founded the organization Reihokan and is its president. Ahagon has received awards including the Okinawa Prefecture Intangible Cultural Asset Award. He is one of a very few number of people to receive 10th Degree Black Belt in both Karate-do and Kobudo on the same day.

== Life ==
Ahagon Naonobu was born on 11 February 1940 Naha, Okinawa, Japan. He was not very big when he was born however he had aspirations of being a strongman. This dream of his would lead him to at the age of 17 in 1957 train under Chibana Chōshin. He trained with Chibana until the master's death in 1969. Under Chibana, he would achieve the rank 4th dan. Ahagon then began training under Shūgorō Nakazato whom he would train under until 1991 and achieve the rank 8th dan. On 4 July 1991, Ahagon founded the organization Reihokan. Ahagon received his 10th dan on 10 June 2007 in both Karate and Kobudo.
