= Chozo Nakama =

Okinawan karateka

- Born: 1899
- Died: 1982 (aged 82–83)
- Style: Shorin-ryu (Kobayashi) Karate-do
- Teacher(s): Chosin Chibana

Chozo Nakama (名嘉真 朝増, Nakama Chōzō, 1899–1982) was a Kobayashi Shorin-ryu karate-do teacher. His primary teacher was Chosin Chibana, founder of Kobayashi Shorin-ryu; however, Nakama also studied with Chomo Hanashiro, Chōtoku Kyan, Kenwa Mabuni, Choki Motobu, and Kentsu Yabu. Nakama taught karate in Shuri, Okinawa, from c. 1935 to 1982.
