= Ankichi Arakaki =

Okinawan martial arts master(Shōrin-ryū karate)despite dying at the age of 28/1927

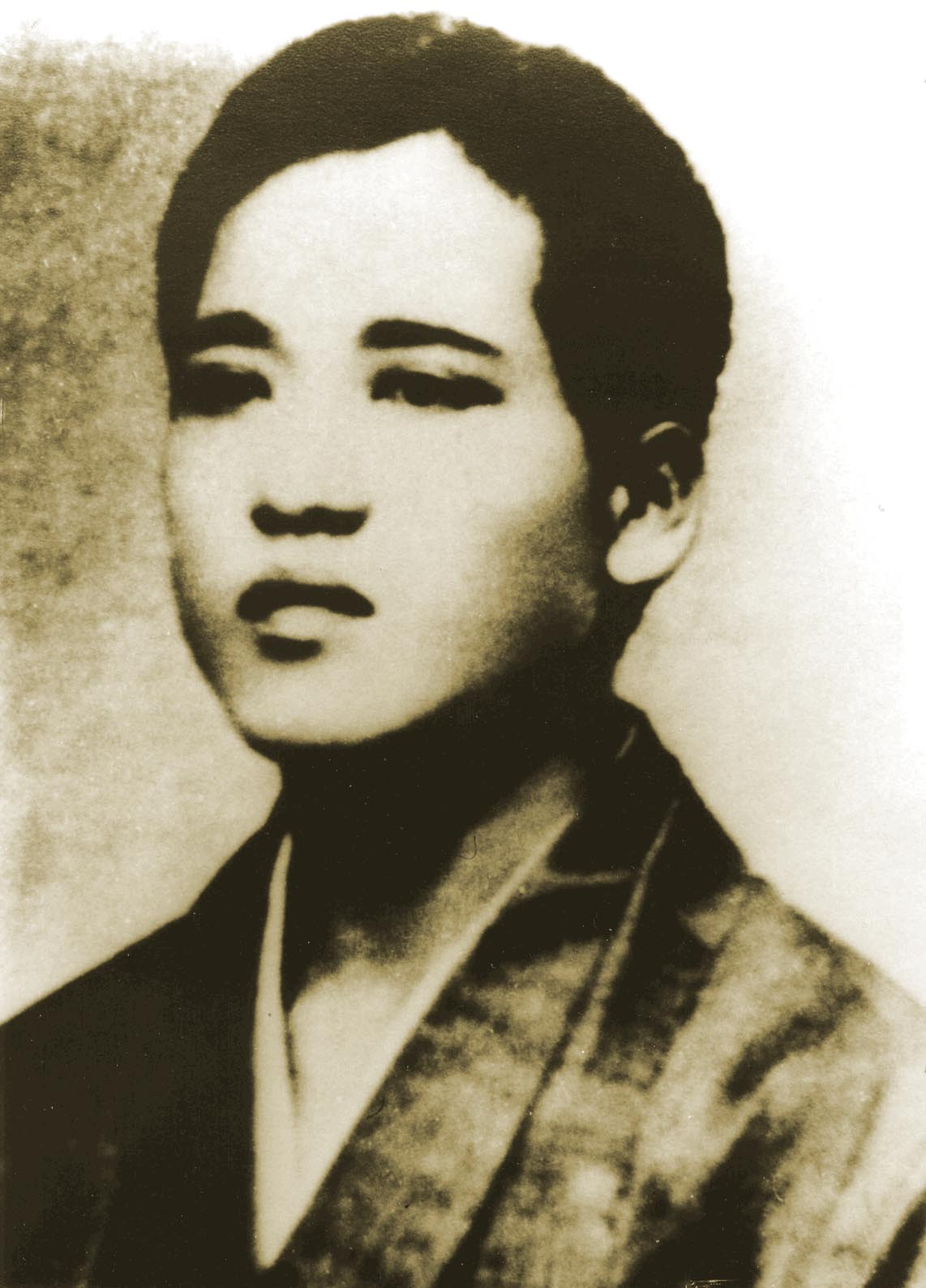
- Ankichi Arakaki
- Born: November 1899; Shuri, Okinawa, Japan
- Died: 29 December 1927 (aged 28); Kadena, Okinawa, Japan; Stomach ulcers
- Style: Shōrin-ryū
- Teachers: Shinpan Gusukuma, Chōmo Hanashiro, Chōshin Chibana, Chotoku Kyan

Other information
- Notable students: Shōshin Nagamine

Ankichi Arakaki (新垣 安吉, Arakaki Ankichi) born in 1899 in Shuri Okinawa became an Okinawan martial arts master who, despite dying at the age of 28 in 1927, is notable for aiding in the evolution of Shōrin-ryū karate. He was extremely important in the education of Shōshin Nagamine, who later went on to found Matsubayashi-ryū karate.

Born in November 1899 in the village of Akata, Province of Shuri, Okinawa, he was the eldest of a family of 11 children. His parents were prosperous farmers, so he lived a comfortable childhood. He was quite young when he began his training in Karate with Shinpan Gusukuma, also known under the name of Shinpan Shiroma (1890–1954), who was his teacher at primary school. One of his teachers at his school was Chomo Hanashiro (1869–1945). Later he became a student of Choshin Chibana (1885–1969), founder of KobayashiShorin-ryu (en). Having no other worries concerning his training, having great support from his parents, he quickly reached a very high level, and was nicknamed Uwayaguwa Ankichi.

Ankichi became an Okinawan martial arts master. His tsumasaki-geri (toe strike), which was his specialty, was devastating. Two stories exist in oral tradition about this kick. One was done to a wrestler the other to his brother. When comparing the symptoms caused by the toe-kick as well as the location of the strike, it appears as if it may have caused a traumatic pseudo-aneurysm in both people kicked. This hypothesis would explain the delayed death of the wrestler..

Contrary to popular belief, there is no evidence that Ankichi Arakaki taught Richard Kim; rather, it appears that Kim studied under a man named Arakaki Sadao, who was in turn a student of Kentsū Yabu. There do not appear to be any primary sources linking Ankichi to either Kentsū Yabu or Richard Kim, the latter of whom first encountered karate in 1927, in Hawaii, and so would have been studying for less than a year at the time of Arakaki's death. Nor is there any evidence that Arakaki Ankichi ever left Okinawa.

He died at the age of 28 years, due to a stomach ulcer.
