= John Giordano =

John Giordano may refer to:

- John Giordano (conductor) (born 1937), American conductor, professor of music, composer, and former concert saxophonist
- John Giordano (ice hockey coach), former ice hockey coach
- John Giordano (lawyer), acting United States Attorney for the District of New Jersey
- John Giordano (martial artist), martial artist and practices alternative medicine
