= Shōjirō =

- Gender: Male

Origin
- Origin: Japanese
- Meaning: Different meanings depending on the kanji used

Shōjirō, Shojiro or Shoujirou (written: 祥二郎, 象二郎 or 正二郎) is a masculine Japanese given name. Notable people with the name include:

- Gotō Shōjirō (後藤 象二郎; 1838–1897), Japanese samurai and politician
- Shōjirō Iida (飯田 祥二郎; 1888–1980), Japanese general
- Shōjirō Ishibashi (石橋 正二郎; 1889–1976), Japanese businessman
- Shojiro Sugimura (杉村 正二郎), Japanese footballer
- Shojiro Sugiyama (杉山 尚次郎; 1929–2015), Japanese karateka
