= Zenpo =

Zenpo may refer to:

- Zenpo Shimabukuro, Karate master, son of Zenryō Shimabukuro (1908–1969)
- Komparu Zempō (1454–1520?), actor and playwright
- Zenpo Kaiten, a forward roll in Judo
- Zenpo-koenfun, keyhole-shaped mounds found on Kofun megalithic tombs or tumuli in Japan, constructed between the early 3rd century and the early 7th century CE
- Zenpo Temple in Tsuruoka, Yamagata
