= Juan Eduardo Castro dos Santos =

Martial artist

J. Eduardo Castro
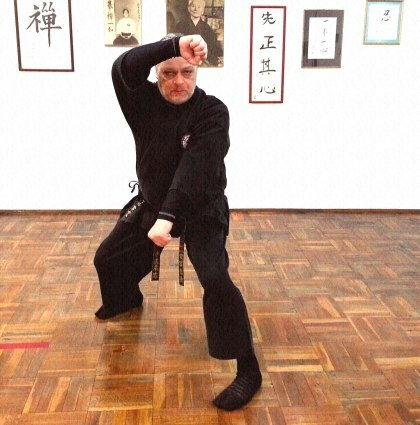
- J. E. Castro in tate no kamae
- Born: Juan Eduardo Castro dos Santos; August 22, 1954 (age 70); Montevideo, Uruguay
- Other names: Kensei (拳生)
- Nationality: Uruguayan
- Style: Okinawa-ken Ryū
- Teacher(s): Shōshin Nagamine

Other information
- Website: http://www.okr1964.org

Juan Eduardo Castro dos Santos (born 1954), also known by the nickname of Kensei (拳生), is a Uruguayan karate grandmaster and Sōke ("Founder") of the style Okinawa-ken Ryū. He was a student, among others, of Georges London, Michihisa Itaya, Sulakshna-Bai, Jintatsu Higa, Seigi Nakamura and Shōshin Nagamine. He also practices Shodō (Zen calligraphy) and Sumi-e (Zen painting).

== Biography ==
J. Eduardo Castro was born in Montevideo on August 22, 1954. He started practicing Japanese aikitai-jiujitsu with a French master, Georges London (1908–1971), in 1964 at age ten. Then he studied Japanese shotokan karate with Japanese master Michihisa Itaya (1941–1972), Hindu yoga with Mahatma Sulakshna-Bai, Korean taekwon-do and, with Okinawan master Jintatsu Higa (1912–1983), Shōrin-ryū karate-dō, kobu-dō and zazen.

On April 1, 1973 professors Jorge Pineda and Mario Díaz left Uruguay naming him instructor of the Instituto Uruguayo de Karate-dō, Kobu-dō y Zazen when he was 18 years old. The same year he was featured in an article of the El Día newspaper. He was also published in several Uruguayan magazines.

In 1978 the Uruguayan authority granted him the title of karate instructor (Uruguayan official teaching license).

Okinawan Shoshin Nagamine (1907–1997) was the most influential of all his masters. Castro collaborated in the translation into Spanish of the book The Essence of Okinawan Karate-dō. Shoshin Nagamine granted him the title of Renshi (錬士 qualified warrior) in 1980 during Castro's visit to Okinawa. Castro actively participated in the last four World Presentations of Shōrin-ryū Karate-dō, Kobu-jutsu and Zen held in Buenos Aires (Argentina), Montevideo (Uruguay) and Naha (Okinawa) between the years 1978 and 1980.

Castro established the Okinawa-ken Ryū school in 1982 to spread his style of martial arts. In 1987 he published his book The Way. The Zen experience in Okinawan Karate., the first martial arts' book written in Uruguay.

Graduated in Law ("Attorney") at the University of Uruguay in 1986.

In 1998 he received the title of Kyōshi (教士 advanced master) from the Okinawan Karate-dō Federation.

In 2006 the World Head of Family Sokeship Council acknowledged him as Sōke and Hanshi (範士 exemplary master).

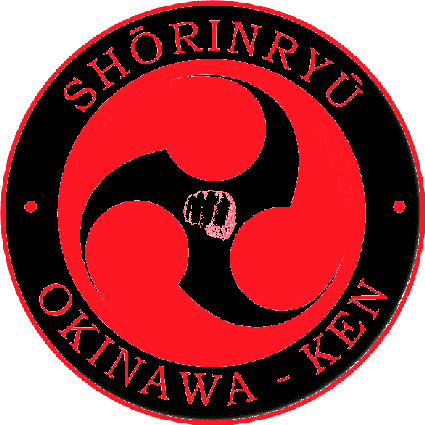

J. E. Castro has been inducted eight times in the International Hall of Fame of the World Grandmasters Council and in 2018 the World Budokan Martial Arts Federation - Okinawan Hakutsuru Kenpo Association awarded him the Hanshi & Ju-dan (10th Degree Black Belt) titles.

- Historical Member award in 2008
- Grandmaster Pinnacle award in 2009
- World Grandmaster Ambassador award in 2010
- Grandmaster Warrior of the WHFSC award in 2011
- WHFSC Platinum Anniversary Grandmaster award in 2012
- WHFSC Shogun award in 2013
- WHFSC Legendary Grandmaster award in 2014
- Distinguished Grandmaster Member of the WHFSC in 2015

== Technique ==
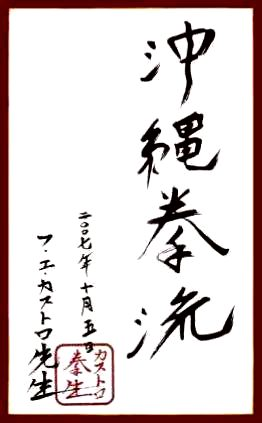
Zen calligraphy "Okinawa-ken Ryū" 沖縄拳流 by Grandmaster J. E. Castro

Okinawa-ken Ryū is a budō (the Zen way of "stopping conflict") style from the Shōrin family. The budō has roots in such disciplines as Zen Buddhism, Taoism, Bushidō and Shintō. Okinawan karate in particular is a weaponless self-defense art and a kinetic therapy through moving Zen.

Okinawa-ken Ryū (Okinawan-fist Style) is a karate-dō, tuite-jutsu, kyusho-jutsu, sai-jutsu, bo-jutsu, hakutsuru-kempo, shodō, sumi-e and Zen school exclusively devoted to the study and practice of the martial ways. OKR is moving Zen: a discipline dedicated to promote the health and harmony of the body, mind and spirit of its students, so they are better prepared to seize the day and to endure the unavoidable crisis of life.
