= Tadashi Yamashita =

Japanese actor and martial artist

- Born: Tadashi Yamashita; February 5, 1942 (age 84); Okinawa, Japan
- Native name: 山下 忠
- Nationality: American; Japanese (expatriate)
- Style: Kobayashi Shōrin-ryū Karate; Matayoshi Kobudo
- Teachers: Shūgorō Nakazato; Shinpo Matayoshi
- Rank: 10th degree black belt in Kobayashi Shōrin-ryū Karate; 10th degree black belt in Matayoshi Kobudo

Other information
- Website: www.tadashiyamashita.com

Tadashi Yamashita (born February 5, 1942) is a Japanese-born American martial artist and actor.

== Early life ==
Tadashi Yamashita was born in Japan in 1942, but he considers himself an Okinawan. His father died when he was three and he and his mother moved to Okinawa when he was 8, after the Second World War. He began martial arts at 11. Yamashita was awarded his black belt when he was 16. He captured the All-Okinawan Shorin-Ryu Free Sparring Grand Championship Title in 1960. He visited Japan in 1968 and tested before Shugoro Nakazato and Chosin Chibana. He lived in Okinawa until in 1966 he moved to the US where he became a citizen.

Yamashita began training in martial arts at the age of 11 when the school PTA president, who was also a martial arts instructor, took him on as a student because he was picking fights with the other students.

He began training with Hanshi Shugoro Nakazato and Hanshi Shinpo Matayoshi in 1953 and in 1968 he tested before his Sensei Shugoro Nakazato, and Grand Master Chosin Chibana. At that time Tadashi Yamashita became the youngest 7th Degree Black Belt in the history of Japan. In 1973 at the Pro-Am Tournament in Los Angeles 7,000 spectators gave him a standing ovation for his demonstration of Kobudo. Sensei Yamashita is known for teaching the late Bruce Lee how to use nunchaku.

== Career ==
Yamashita has dedicated over 60 years of his life to the practice of Okinawan Karatedo and Kobudo. He is a tenth dan in both karatedo and kobudo. Yamashita is the President and Director of US Shorin-Ryu Karate Association, the US President of the Zen Okinawan Kobudo Association and Chief Instructor of Shorin Ryu in the United States.

Yamashita has traveled to South America, Greece and Bulgaria. Yamashita goes to Hampton Roads, Virginia, US annually. Bateman and his students work out with him on these occasions. Yamashita keeps a close connection with his birthplace of Japan and Okinawa. He has studied under Chibana Chosin of Shorin Ryu, Shuguro Nakazato of Shorin Ryu Shorin Kan and Shinpo Matayoshi, founder of the Zen Okinawan Kobudo Renmei.

Yamashita combines many progressive fighting tactics with traditional aspects of karatedo. Yamashita's system (known as Suikendo) translates to fist flowing like water. This system of fighting allows the karateka to simultaneously block and strike his opponent.

Yamashita has made many movies over the past 20 years. His first was The Karate in 1973. For several years, he was billed in American films as Bronson Lee.

== Books ==
- Shorin-ryu Karate: Japanese Art of Self Defense (ISBN 978-0897500203)
- Advanced Tonfa: Japanese Weapon of Self-Defense (ISBN 978-0897501170)
- Dynamic Nunchaku (ISBN 978-0897501057)
- Martial Arts: Weapons Demonstrations (ISBN 978-0897501149)
- Ninpo Ninjutsu: The Complete History and Training Guide (ISBN 978-0865680845)
- Kusarigama: The Flashing Art of the Sickle Weapon (ISBN 089750108X)

== Filmography ==
- The Karate (aka Bronson Lee Champion) (1974)
- The Karate II (aka The Blind Karate Man) (1974)
- The Karate III (1975)
- Soul of Chiba (aka Soul of Bruce Lee) (1977)
- Seven (1979)
- The Magnificent Three (1980)
- The Octagon (1980)
- The Shinobi Ninja (1981)
- Gymkata (1985)
- American Ninja (1985)
- Sword of Heaven (1985)
- Capital Punishment (1991)
- American Ninja 5 (1993)
- Rising Sun (1993)
- Carjack (1996)

== Television appearances ==
- Judge Dee and the Monastery Murders (1974) (TV Movie)
- Kung Fu
- A Man Called Sloan
- Knight Rider
- Thrillseekers
- ESPN Karate Demonstrations

== Magazine featured ==
Sensei Yamashita has been featured in many magazines including:

- Black Belt (1971, 1973, 1977, 1986)
- Inside Kung Fu (1974, 1980, 1984)
- Kick (1980, 1982, 1983)
- Fighting Stars (1977)
- Karate (1972)
- Samurai
- MA Weapons
- Fighting Arts
- Martial Arts Unleashed (2019)
