= Mitchell Bobrow =

American martial artist

- Born: Mitchell Paul Bobrow; Washington, D.C., US
- Other names: Boy Wonder
- Nationality: American
- Height: 6 ft 2 in (1.88 m)
- Weight: 220 lb (100 kg; 16 st)
- Style: Tang Soo Do, Karate, Aikido, Boxing, Taekwondo, Jujitsu
- Stance: Orthodox
- Fighting out of: Kim Studio Silver Spring, Maryland
- Trainer: Ki Whang Kim
- Years active: 1961–present

Other information
- Website: www.MitchellBobrow.com

Mitchell Bobrow is a martial arts fighter who was trained by Ki Whang Kim in the early 1960s. Bobrow was known for his continuous attacks using a unique combination of kicks, punches, and sweeps including his Trademark Jump Back Kick that scored on his opponents with either leg.

== Early life ==
Mitchell Bobrow was born in Washington, DC, born to Meyer Bobrow, who immigrated from Poland, and Sara Bobrow of Baltimore, Maryland. He was the second of three boys, brothers Nathan Mark and Jack Hal Bobrow. Mitchell began Karate/Taekwondo training at the age of 12 while attending Montgomery Hills Junior High School, in Silver Springs, Maryland.

== Career ==
Bobrow was the first fighter ever to be nicknamed by Blackbelt magazine, "Boy Wonder" in 1967. Bobrow started competing as an adult Black Belt at the young age of 15 with Chuck Norris, Joe Lewis, Ron Marchini, Toyotaro Miyazaki, Benny Urquidez, Jim Harrison, Louis Delgato, Joe Hayes, Thomas La Puppet Carroll, and Bill "Superfoot" Wallace during the blood and guts "golden era" of Martial Arts Combat in the US. Bobrow was a friend of Bruce Lee, who was often seen coaching on the sidelines when Bobrow competed. Blackbelt magazine yearbook rated Bobrow as a top ten fighter in the world throughout the 60s, and Karate Illustrated magazine placed him #1 in 1969 above Chuck Norris, Joe Lewis, and Bill Wallace. Bobrow was the youngest fighter ever to be ranked a Top Ten fighter by Blackbelt Magazine and still holds that honor.The Real Karate Kid.

Bobrow was inducted into the 2007 Inaugural Taekwondo Hall of Fame as Best Fighter of the 60s and was the event's chairman. In 2009 he was selected as a Technical Advisor for the Taekwondo Hall of Fame. The logo on the Ring for the Taekwondo Hall of Fame features Bobrow's image. He represented the United States Team in Tokyo at the First Karate World Championships, the World Karate Federation held at the Nippon Budokan. He was Grand Champion at the 1969 All-American Open Championship at Madison Square Garden, American Invitational Tournament of Champions, Marine Corps Grand Champion, International Heavyweight Champion, and Universal Open Champion. Bobrow was the founder of the first chartered karate club in the United States at Bethesda Chevy Chase High School in 1966 and graduated from George Washington University and Baron Brown Acting Studio. Bobrow opened E F Sly- Superstar Boutique in the trendy Georgetown quarter of Washington DC in 1972. Bobrow is the founder-owner of Otomix Sports & Martial Arts Gear in 1989, which was the official sponsor of the first UFC mixed martial arts fighting championships in 1993. Bobrow produced the Black Belt Grand Slam of Karate with Arnold Schwarzenegger and PKA founder Joe Corley. Otomix was the first company to design and manufacture sports-specific shoes for bodybuilders, weightlifters, and martial artists. Bobrow has appeared in films and television. In 2012, Bobrow founded the Ultimate Professional Golf Shootout, a professional golf event and tour in Las Vegas. Bobrow operates Otomix Sports Gear, and he is an Elected National Board Member of SAG-AFTRA 2021–29, and a Real Estate Professional in Nevada

== Filmography ==
Actor
Year	Film	Role	Other notes
1975	Rock & Soul	Host VJ	WDCA
1993	Coneheads	Garthok Combatant	
1992	Blackbelt	Rene	Co-Star
2015	The Squeeze	Golfer	
1990	Max Monroe	Thief	
1989	Wild Jack	Chet	
1988	Young and the Restless	Rene	
1987	Days of our Lives	Shooter	
