= Kokan Oyadomari =

Okinawan karateka

- Born: 1827; Ryūkyū Kingdom
- Died: 1905 (aged 77–78); Okinawa, Japan
- Style: Tote, Karate; Tomari-te
- Teachers: Karyu Uku, Kishin Teruya, Anan, Ason

Other information
- Notable students: Chotoku Kyan

Kokan Oyadomari (親泊 興寛,1827–1905) was a Ryūkyūan karate master, who practised the Tomari-te style of karate and also taught it.

== Life ==
Kokan Oyadomari was a disciple to two local masters: Kishin Teruya (1804–1864) and Giko Uku (1800–1850). From Teruya, Oyadomari learned Passai, Rohai, and Wanshu, and from Uku the kata Naifanchi.

Oyadomari was also a disciple of Ason and of Annan (also Ahnan or Anan). Annan was a Chinese sailor or possibly a pirate, who was a castaway from a shipwreck along the coast of Okinawa Island. Annan took refuge in the cemetery of the mountains near Tomari. There is a legend which indicates that Annan was the master who taught the kata Chinto to Sokon Matsumura.
