= Shōrin-ryū Shidōkan =

Style of karate

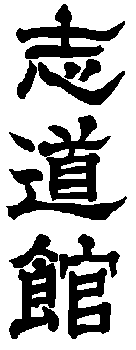
- Shidō-kan logo
- Date founded: 1948
- Country of origin: Okinawa, Japan
- Founder: Katsuya Miyahira
- Arts taught: Karate
- Ancestor schools: Shorin-ryū

Shorin-ryu Shidokan (小林流志道館, Shōrin-ryū Shidōkan) is a branch of Shorin-ryū karate, started by Katsuya Miyahira, Hanshi 10th Dan.

It should not be confused with the newer Japanese Shidōkan (世界空手道連盟士道館 World Karate Association Shidōkan), which was founded by Yoshiji Soeno in 1981, a style of knockdown karate. Okinawan Shidokan (志道館) precedes Japanese Shidokan (士道館) by 33 years.

== History ==
=== Origin of Shidō-kan ===
In October 1948, Katsuya Miyahira opened his first karate dojo in Kanehisa, Nishihara, Okinawa, after receiving his Shihan (4th rank) Certificate from Chōshin Chibana. Sensei Miyahira received his 10th Dan in 1978. Miyahira chose to name his dojo Shidō-kan (志道館, "House of the Way of the Warrior"). "Shidō" was taken from the Analects by Confucius, chapter seven, verse six in book four of the twenty volume collection; which reads:

Determine in your heart to forever follow the way.
Stay close to the sun of virtue and do not stray.
Trust in the power of benevolence for support.
Take pleasure from these abilities.

Many Miyahira students now wear just "Shi do" 志道 on their karate gi left chest rather than Shi Do Kan 志道館.

=== Creation of Shorin-ryū Shidō-kan ===
In Chosin Chibana's Shorin-ryu Karate 小林流 (also read as Kobayashi) five of his senior students were promoted to 9th Dan. Upon Chibana's death in 1969, Chibana's most senior student, Katsuya Miyahira, received the hanko (official seals of the organization) and was voted president of the Okinawa Shorin-ryū Karate-dō Association / Kyokai (OSKK). Chibana's most senior students split the style of Shorin-ryū karate into various schools, Miyahira heading the main branch which is now called Shidō-kan (志道館) style, based upon the name of Miyahira's dojo. Shuguro Nakazato formed Shorinkan, Yuchoku Higa formed Kyudokan, Chozo Nakama, and Kensei Kinjo formed Kushin-ryu.

=== Shidokan characteristics ===
Shidokan, like most Chibana-ha or Kobayashi schools, is generally characterized by relatively high stances (typical of self defense karate), quick and light movements, and explosive power.

=== Shidokan dojo guidelines ===
Miyahira Shidokan dojo's guidelines:

Try to perfect one's own personality
Cultivate the spirit of making constant efforts
Admonish one's own youthful ardor
Value good manners

=== Thoughts on Kata ===
Kata is never concrete in performance or interpretation. It changes either knowingly, unknowingly or through the passage of time. Sometimes the changes are small—like changing the emphasis of punching to kicking or to quick movements or to slow, steady movements. An instructor may favor one technique over another and tell his students to emphasize it more than it was originally taught. The kata is still the same but a change has now taken place either consciously or unconsciously. These minor changes have not really changed the style. These changes cannot be prevented either, for in most cases the change occurs over a long period of time.

=== Patience ===
Posted on the Wall in the Shidokan Dojo:

To Have Patience Where it is Possible
Is Not Real Patience
Yet to Have Patience Where It Is Impossible
Is Real Patience!

=== Shidokan maxims posted in dojo ===
Proper Spirit:

- You should thoroughly understand and pay strict attention to your teacher's corrections and apply them correctly.
- You can attain perfection by exercising patience and through constant training.
- In learning the basic techniques, learn to apply them, adopt them and finally transform them to your own taste but always according to the correct theory of basic techniques.
- You should listen to and accept the corrections of the more senior or advanced students.
- Try to assimilate everything good in your peers and use it to correct that which is inconsistent in you.
- When teaching you should always be kind but firm and strict with your juniors.

Conduct:

- To acquire experience and understanding, take seriously all advice given to you.
- Never judge or take a person lightly.
- Accept with an open mind the opinions and remarks of others, if they prove to be earnest, just and correct.
- Be honest, fair and true whenever you ponder over or reason out a problem or theory.
- When you are not training, quietly sit by the edge of the dojo and watch the activities of your fellow students and how they are corrected.

=== Shidōkan in Okinawa today ===
Today, Shidō-kan is one of the largest styles of karate in Okinawa, with over 25 dojo in the prefecture. Within Okinawa, Shidō-kan is well known for its success in the Okinawan Bare Knuckle karate tournaments, largely due to Koichi Nakasone. Okinawa, an extensive number of Shidokan Dojos throughout Okinawa, Seiyu Nakamura, Hanshi 10th Dan, and a student of Sensei Miyahira's, has a dojo in Yaese-cho Okinawa, Japan where he currently resides.

Maeshiro Morinobu, Hanshi 10th Dan, President of OSKK and Naha city karate federation chairman, teaches in the Shidokan Hombu dojo and in his own dojo in Naha.

=== International Shidokan ===
Argentina: Shoei Miyazato moved to Argentina in 1959. Miyazato began teaching Shidō-kan in his new hometown, Cordoba. In the early 1990s, Miyazato left Shidō-kan to head his own style of karate but a few years later rejoined Miyahira's Shidokan Organization. After Shoei Miyazato sensei's demise in 2013, Masatoshi Miyazato, Hanshi 10th Dan, Shoei Miyazato's son, started heading up the Miyazato Dojo and organization. They have over 90 affiliated dojos throughout Latina America and Europe and between 9,000 and 10,000 active students. They celebrated their 60th anniversary in November 2019, and their 65th anniversary in October 2024 following a big celebration in Okinawa, Miyazato Sensei birthplace.

In 1996, Shidō-kan was reestablished by Jorge Garzón, Kyoshi 8th Dan, Shorin Ryu Shidokan in Argentina who has a dojo in La Plata Hombu Dojo Shido Kan Argentina, dojos in Buenos Aires, La Pampa Cordoba, and 25 affiliated dojos in Argentina. Garzón is a student of Takeshi Miyagi, Hanshi 9th Dan and former student of Miyazato who previously lived in Argentina, but currently resides and has a dojo in Tokyo.

Australia: Shidō-kan Australia is headed by Alberto Presincula, Hanshi 9th Dan. He has a dojo in Albion, Victoria and he is also a representative of Okinawa Shorin ryu Karate-do Kyokai in Australia appointed by the President of The Association, Takeshi Miyage. He was a student of Iha from the 1960s until 2012. He was also under Latino H. Gonzalez, 9th Dan (Father of Philippine Karate). He had taught many U.S. Navy and U.S. Marine Corps members at Subic Bay Naval Base and San Miguel Naval Communication Base, Philippines. He promoted many in Dan rank from his Dojo (United Karatedo Association) during his time in the Philippines, one notable student in 1979 promoted to 3rd Dan was Cris A. Bato, a former U.S. Marine Sergeant and Close Combat Instructor.

Brazil: In August 1990, Kazunori Yonamine began teaching Shidō-kan in the city of São Vicente, Brazil. In subsequent years, Yonamine's students spread Shidō-kan throughout Brazil to the cities of Piracicaba, São Paulo, Santos and Itajubá. Today there are up to 17 Shidō-kan dojos across these towns. Yonamine died on 22 October 2015 as Hanshi 9th Dan.

In Brasilia, Sensei Herbert "Dada" Inocalla, a 3rd Dan Black Belt under Filipino movie actor Rolando Gonzalez, 7th Dan, son of Latino H. Gonzalez, 9th Dan, continues to teach Shorin-Ryu Karate in his Academia Magka-Isa.

Canada: Roy Paul, Kyoshi 8th Dan, is the head of Shidō-kan in Canada. He is a student of Iha and had a dojo in Guelph, Ontario which was closed in 2023. after 25 years of operation when Sensei Roy Paul retired from regular teaching. The largest dojo in Canada is located in Waterloo, Ontario under the leadership of Fortunato Restagno, Kyoshi 8th Dan. The Grand River Karate in Waterloo celebrated being part of the Beikoku Shidokan North American Shidokan Karatedo Association for 25 years in 2024. There are also dojo in Trois Rivieres, Quebec.

Czech Republic: Shidō-kan in the Czech Republic is led by Petr Zazvorka Renshi 6th Dan. He is in charge of Shidō-kan dojo Liberec.

France: Shidō-kan in France is headed by Dikran Kevork, Hanshi 10th Dan. He began teaching Shidō-kan in Marseille in September 1988.

Germany: Shidō-kan Germany is headed by Joachim Laupp, Hanshi 9th Dan, who teaches in Düsseldorf and Trier and is represented worldwide by his senior students Elli Hatamy, Kyoshi 7th Dan, and Vassilis Raptopoulos, Kyoshi 7th Dan. His students have Dojos in Marburg, two Dojos in Chemnitz, Neumark and Berlin.

Greece: Vassilis Raptopoulos, Kyoshi 7th Dan, a student of Joachim Laupp, Hanshi 9th Dan, opened up a Dojo in Athens in 2009 and is the national representative of the Shidōkan Shirasagi School in Greece.

Guam: in 1969, Iha and Seigi Shiroma traveled to Guam. Shiroma stayed there and opened a dojo. Shiroma is currently ranked Hanshi, 10th Dan and continues to teach.

Israel: Amit Michaeli, Renshi 6th Dan, has a dojo in Jerusalem. He is a student of Paul Snader, Koyshi 8th Dan, who trains in New Jersey under Sensei Iha, Hanshi 10th Dan.

India: R.Bhaskaran, Kyoshi 7th Dan Student of Sensei Kevork Dick, Hanshi 10th Dan, teaches in Chennai and is the national representative of the Shidōkan Nakamura Dojo in India.

PN Manoj, Kyoshi 7th Dan, student of Sensei Laupp, Hanshi 9th Dan, teaches in Kannur and is the national representative of the Shidōkan Shirasagi School in India.

Italy: Emanuel Giordano, Renshi 5th Dan, teaches in Turin; he is a student of Maeshiro Morinobu and Okinawa Shorin-ryu Karatedo Kyokai member. Josè Speranza, Kyoshi 7th Dan, teaches in Cisterna di Latina. He was a student of Sensei Shoei Miyazato. Miguel Carballo, Renshi 5th Dan, teaches in Florence, Loppiano. He was Student of Luzuriaga Carlos and Sensei Shoei Miyazato.

Netherlands: Marcel Proost, Renshi 5th Dan, opened a dojo in Enschede in 2016.

Philippines: in 1963, Miyahira received a request to supply a Shorin-ryū instructor to the Philippines from Latino Gonzalez. Seikichi Iha, a student of Miyahira's, was selected and spent 11 months in Manila at the dojo of Latino Gonzalez.

Russia: Dmitry Uritsky, 2nd Dan, has a dojo in Moscow. He is also a student of Snader.

Spain: Manuel Garcia Leynez, Renshi 6th Dan, student of Sensei Laupp, Hanshi 9th Dan, teaches Shidōkan Shirasagi in Rota, Cádiz and is also the national representative of the Shidokan Shirasagi school in Spain.

Switzerland: Ralph Kohler, Renshi 5th Dan, student of Sensei Joachim Laupp, Hanshi 9th Dan, runs dojos in Zurich and Ticino and is the national representative of the Shidōkan Shirasagi School in Switzerland.

United States: Seikichi Iha (born in 1932, Okinawa, died on August 3, 2024, Lansing, MI, USA) was the senior-most practitioner of Okinawa Shorin-ryu residing in the United States and is ranked a Hanshi 10th Dan by the Okinawa Shorin-ryu Karate-do Association of Naha, Okinawa. He was promoted to 10th Dan March 25, 2001. He was Miyahira's senior student and the rank/leader board in Miyahira's Dojo still lists Iha's name right next to Miyahira's testifying to that. Before coming to Michigan, Iha Sensei trained students in Okinawa, Japan, the Philippines, Guam, and Los Angeles, California. His Lansing dojo is now the headquarters of the Beikoku Shidokan Association for more than 30 North American schools and is frequently visited by karate practitioners from around the globe. Iha was introduced to Miyahira by Shoei Miyazato and began studying with Miyahira when his first instructor, Shinpan (Shiromoa) Gusukuma, died. In 1967, Iha went to Los Angeles, California to teach at the American-Okinawan Club. After 7 months, Iha opened the Shureikan Dojo on Olympic Blvd with two other 7th Dan black belts. A year later, Iha started his own dojo on West Pico Blvd and named it Shidokan Karate Dojo. Iha moved to Lansing, Michigan in April 1975, and began teaching at the Original Okinawa Karate Dojo. Iha was ranked Hanshi, 10th Dan.

After Sensei Seikichi Iha's death Beikoku Shidokan Karatedo Association is co-led by Mark McCloud, 9th Dan and Paul Snader, 9th Dan

==== US belt rank order (belt colours associated with particular kyu and dan levels) ====
Kyu and dan level	Belt Colour
7th	White with yellow tip
6th	Yellow
5th	Yellow with green tip
4th	Green
3rd	Green with brown tip
2nd	Brown
1st	Brown with black tip
Dan levels 1–6th	Black with golden stripes (number of stripes are equal to the dan level)
Dan 7–8th	Red and white patterned
Dan 9–10th	Red

=== Shidō-kan today ===
Today, Shidō-kan is one of the largest styles of karate in Okinawa, with over 25 dojo in the prefecture. Within Okinawa, Shidō-kan is well known for its success in the Okinawan Bare Knuckle karate tournaments, largely due to Koichi Nakasone.

== Basic techniques ==
=== Punches and strikes ===
- High punch – jodan zuki
- Middle punch – chudan zuki
- Knife hand strike – shuto uchi

=== Kicks ===
- Front snap kick – mae geri
- Side kick – yoko geri
- Roundhouse kick – mawashi geri
- Back thrust kick – ushiro geri
- Stomping kick – fumikomi geri
- Inside Stomp Kick – kin geri
- hook kick – ura mawashi

=== Blocks ===
- High block – jodan uke
- Outside block – soto uke
- Inside block – uchi uke
- Low block – gedan barai
- Hooking hand block – kagite uke
- Swimming or flowing block – nagashi uke

=== Stances ===
- Attention stance – musubi dachi
- Natural stance – shizentai dachi
- Basic stance – kihon dachi
- Neutral stance – uki ashi dachi
- Straddle stance – shiko dachi
- Forward stance – zenkutsu dachi
- Horse stance – kiba dachi
- Layout back stance – kokutsu dachi
- Cat stance – neko ashi dachi
- Cross leg stance – kosa dachi

== Kata ==
The kata practiced in Shidō-kan varies by dojo. The following series of kata are common to all: Kihon, Naihanchi, Pinan, Passai, Kusanku, Chinto, Gojushiho, and Tetsu Shou (created by Miyahira). Additionally, some schools practice Jion, Seisan, and Koryu Passai (Old Style Passai).

== See also ==
- Makiwara
- Hojo undō
