= John Corcoran (martial arts) =

Martial artist and writer

John Corcoran was an American non-fiction book author, magazine editor, screenwriter and martial arts historian.

== Early life ==
Born in Pittsburgh, Pennsylvania, he began martial arts training in 1967 eventually writing press releases for his Shōrin-ryū karate instructor to pay for lessons. In 1973, as a newly promoted black belt, he compiled the first set of national Top Ten ratings for American karate kata competitors for Official Karate magazine.

Over the next three decades, Corcoran served as editor of Black Belt, and then Professional Karate, Inside Kung Fu, KICK Illustrated, The Fighter International and Martial Arts Success.

In September 1974, Corcoran also worked as publicist and production coordinator for Mike Anderson’s World Professional Karate Championships, the event which launched both the Professional Karate Association (PKA) and the international kickboxing movement. He became the first PKA events coordinator where he befriended heavyweight kickboxing champion Joe Lewis who became his mentor.

In 1980, Corcoran co-founded the STAR System World Kickboxing Ratings with Paul Maslak.

In 1993, Corcoran wrote the screenplay for the film American Samurai starring Mark Dacascos. He was a primary technical consultant for the A&E channel’s 1998 documentary, Mystic Origins of the Martial Arts, and worked in that same capacity in 2002 on Modern Warriors, produced by documentarian Peter Spirer.

In 2000, Corcoran received Gary Lee's "Living Legends Hall of Fame Award" and in 2002 he received the Battle of Atlanta's "Hall of Fame Award". In 2004, he received the Martial Arts History Museum's "Funakoshi Award".

== Book Publications ==
Corcoran has authored eleven books relating to martial arts. He was selected by the editors of both the World Book Encyclopedia in 1986 and Microsoft Encarta (Electronic) Encyclopedia in 1996 to write entries relating to martial arts.

- The Complete Martial Arts Catalogue (with Emil Farkas, Simon & Schuster, 1977)
- Martial Arts: Traditions, History, People (with Emil Farkas, Gallery Books, W.H. Smith Publishers, Inc., 1983)
- The Overlook Martial Arts Dictionary (with Emil Farkas, Overlook Press, 1985)
- The Martial Arts Companion: Culture, History and Enlightenment (Millard Press, BDD Promotional Books, 1992)
- The Original Martial Arts Encyclopedia: Tradition, History, Pioneers (with Emil Farkas and Stuart Sobel, Pro-Action Publications, 1993)
- The Martial Arts Sourcebook (Harper Collins Publishers, 1994)
- ACMA Instructor Certification Manual (with John Graden, Graden Communications, 1998)
- The Ultimate Martial Arts Q&A Book (with John Graden, McGraw-Hill, 2001)
- The Unauthorized Jackie Chan Encyclopedia (McGraw-Hill, 2002)
- Martial Arts Encyclopedia: The New and Revised Edition of the Original (with Emil Farkas, CreateSpace Publishing, 2012)
