= United States Kickboxing Association =

- Company type: Martial Arts Organization
- Founded: 1970
- Founder: Lee Faulkner
- Area served: Worldwide

The first American sanctioning body to regulate kickboxing matches, the United States Kickboxing Association (USKA) was established in early 1970 by former Green Beret Lee Faulkner following his promotion of North America’s debut kickboxing bout featuring Joe Lewis’ knockout victory over Greg Baines. The USKA’s rules permitted kicking, punching, knee and elbow strikes, and footsweeps. Only crescent kicks and round kicks were allowed to the head. Hitting below the belt and striking-and-holding were prohibited. Bouts consisted of four by three-minute rounds inside a boxing ring, with one-minute rest periods. Contestants wore twelve-ounce gloves and elective gym shoes or no shoes.

The USKA sanctioned only a handful of US title bouts although the organization had planned a merger with the All Japan Kick-Boxing Association for purposes of world title bouts, and even modified its name to the United States Kick-Boxing Association (USKBA), shortly before the USKA disintegrated in 1972. The USKA succeeded, however, in arranging for the importation and weekly television broadcast of Japanese muay Thai-style "kick-boxing" bouts, with English play-by-play, over KTLA Channel 5 in Los Angeles. This USKA should not be confused with the United States Karate Association (USKA) which affiliated karate schools and promoted the USKA Grand National Championship karate tournament.

== See also ==
- American kickboxing
- Full contact karate
- United States Karate Association (USKA)
- Professional Karate Association (PKA)
- World Kickboxing Association (WKA)
- International Sport Karate Association (ISKA)
- World Association of Kickboxing Organizations (WAKO)
