= Shōbayashi Shōrin-ryū =

Style of karate

Shōrin-ryū
- Also known as: Shōbayashi Shōrin-ryū
- Country of origin: Okinawa, Japan
- Founder: Eizo Shimabukuro
- Current head: Eizo Shimabukuro
- Arts taught: Karate, Kobujutsu, Jujutsu
- Ancestor schools: Shorin-ryū
- Practitioners: Joe Lewis, Bill Wallace, Jerry Gould, Bill Hayes, Kevin Dewayne Hughes, Steve Rittersporn, Ken Shugg, Ilene J. Smoger Mark Knox Darryl Balesheski

Shōbayashi Shōrin-ryu (少林流) (Shōrin-ryū) is a style of Okinawan Shorin-ryu karate founded by Eizo Shimabukuro. Eizo Shimabukuro (1925-2017) dropped the Chatan Yara no Kusanku and the Oyadamari no Passai he learned from Chotoku Kyan and he added Kusanku Sho and Dai and Passai Sho and Dai of Yasutsune Itosu lineage. It is said that Eizo Shimabukuro learned these Itosu kata as well as Pinan Shodan to Godan and Naihanchin Shodan to Sandan from Choshin Chibana. However, in his book "Okinawa Karatedo Old Grandmaster Stories" Eizo Shimabukuro says that Chibana was too old to teach and so Chibana referred Shimabukuro to his senior student, Nakazato, for instruction. Eizo Shimabuku also added two kata from his time in Goju-ryu with Chojun Miyagi. These kata being Seiyunchin and Sanchin (Eizo Shimabukuro used to call his version of Sanchin, Sanchu). At one time Shimabuku taught Shorin-ryu and Goju-ryu side by side.

== History ==
Although Chinese martial arts began spreading to Okinawa in the 14th century, it was not prominent until the 18th century, when Kusanku, a Chinese military official, visited Okinawa and gave a demonstration. In subsequent visits, he started teaching "quan fa" (meaning "fist way") to Okinawans.

Kanga Sakukawa blended Kusanku's quan fa with indigenous Okinawan martial arts to form the first martial art style called karate. His student Sokon Matsumura blended Sakugawa's style with Shaolin kung fu to form Shuri-te karate.

Matsumura was Anko Itosu's primary instructor, and both Matsumura and Itosu instructed Chotoku Kyan and Choki Motobu. Several of Kyan's students would go on to lead their own branches of karate. These are: Shoshin Nagamine (Matsubayashi-ryu), Tatsuo Shimabukuro (Isshin-ryu), Eizo Shimabukuro (Shobayashi Shorin Ryu), Joen Nakazato (Shorinji-ryu), and Zenryo Shimabukuro (Shorin-ryu Seibukan).

Eizo Shimabukuro studied under Chojun Miyagi, before taking up Shuri-Te under Chotoku Kyan. Although Kyan then became his primary instructor, Shimabukuro also studied under Choki Motobu, and weapons under Taira Shinken. In 1959 at the Kodokan in Japan, Kanken Tōyama promoted Eizo Shimabukuro to 10th Dan. At the age of 34, Shimabukuro was the youngest person ever to receive such an honor. Tatsuo was senior to Eizo and when he started Isshinryu, Eizo took over. Eizo studied often with his older brother Tatsuo, which may explain why the kata are so similar and Eizo retained Sanchin and Seiunchin.

Eizo trained notable students such as Bill Wallace and Joe Lewis while Wallace, in the Air Force, and Lewis, in the Marines, were stationed in Okinawa.
