= Ananku =

Kata practised in Okinawan karate

Ananku (安南空) is a kata from Okinawan karate. Its history in Okinawan martial arts is relatively short in comparison to other kata as it was composed by Chotoku Kyan. Its meaning is "Light from the South" or "Peace from the South", as it is thought to originate when Kyan returned from a trip to Taiwan.

What makes this kata special is its techniques of offense and defense while in zenkutsu dachi and Naname Zenkutsu Dachi (otherwise known as front leg bent stance or bow stance and Slanted Front Stance, Ryo-hanchin dachi in Okinawan) This kata also introduces the aforementioned Naname Zenkutsu Dachi in Shōrin-ryū and Matsubayashi-ryū. It is also the first Shōrin/Matsubayashi-ryū kata to start with a centered movement blocking to both sides of the body.
