= Katsuya Miyahira =

Okinawan karateka

- Born: 16 August 1918; Nishihara, Okinawa, Japan
- Died: 28 November 2010 (aged 92); Japan; Cancer
- Style: Shorin-ryu Shido-kan
- Teacher(s): Chosin Chibana, Anbun Tokuda, Choki Motobu
- Rank: Hanshi, 10th Dan

Katsuya Miyahira (宮平 勝哉, Miyahira Katsuya, 1918–2010) was an Okinawan martial artist who was the grand master of the Shorin-ryu Shido-kan style of Okinawan Karate and the president of the Okinawa Shorin-ryu Karate Association. He was ranked Hanshi, 10th Dan. Miyahira created the Shido-kan branch of Kobayashi Shorin-ryu after the death of his teacher, Chōshin Chibana. Miyahira was also instructed by Anbun Tokuda and Choki Motobu.
