= Shōrin-ryū Shōrinkan =

Style of Okinawan karate

- Shōrin-ryū Shōrinkan
- Date founded: 1975
- Country of origin: Okinawa, Japan
- Founder: Shūgorō Nakazato
- Current head: Minoru Nakazato
- Arts taught: Karate
- Ancestor schools: shuri-te; Kobayashi Shorin-ryū
- Descendant schools: Suikendo Shorin Ryu; Shorin-ryu Reihokan; Shorin-ryu Shobukan Shorin-Ryu Koshinkan

Shorin-ryu Shorinkan (小林流小林館, Shōrin-ryū Shōrinkan) is a branch of the Kobayashi Shōrin-ryū style of Okinawan karate, developed by Shūgorō Nakazato, Hanshi 10th Dan. Nakazato was a student of Chōshin Chibana. After Chibana's death in 1969, Nakazato assumed the title of Vice President of the Okinawa Shorin-Ryū Karate-do Association. In November 1975, Nakazato resigned from this association and formed the Okinawa Karate-do Shorin-Ryū Shorinkan Association.

In the United States the senior teachers are Noel Smith (8th dan) and Eddie Bethea. Both Smith and Bethea trained directly under Nakazato in the early 1960s, and have first-hand knowledge of his teachings, philosophies and concepts of karate. In the early years, seven of Nakazato's black belts returned to the US to spread Okinawan Shorin-ryu to the States; they are referred to as the Original 7.

== North America Shorinkan lineage ==
This lineage only reflects the Original 7 black belts from Shugoro Nakazato and their Kyoshis: Tadashi Yamashita, Nabil Noujaim, Eddie Bethea, Pat Haley, Noel Smith, C.D. Williamson, Neil Stolsmark, Sean Riley, Sam Ahtye, David Rogers, Robert Rowley, Claude Johnson, and Harunobu Chiba.
