= Arturo Worrell =

Panamaian karateka

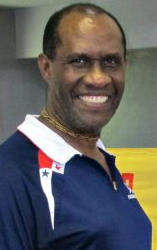
- Sensei Arturo Worrell in 2012
- Born: August 4, 1950 (age 76); Panama, Republic of Panama
- Occupations: Karate Practitioner and Instructor
- Years active: 1964–present

Arturo Worrell (4 August 1950 in Panama) is a Panamanian Shotokan Karate practitioner, founder and Chief Officer of the Panamanian Association of Shotokan Karate, a JKA affiliated organization. His work of teaching shotokan karate has been instrumental in spreading Shotokan style both in Panama and Costa Rica.

== Biography ==
Arturo Worrell began his interest in martial arts at the age of 12 when he began judo. He practiced judo for 10 years and obtained the brown belt. In 1964 he signed up to the Dai-Ichi-Karate-Kai (First School of Karate) with Vincent A. Cruz and continued to train both judo and karate, obtaining Cho-Dan (first black belt) in both martial arts. He was hired as an instructor to the Panamanian National Guard and opened the first permanent Shotokan Karate dojo the "Estudio de Karate Worrell Internacional" (now just "Estudio de Karate Worrell") in the mid-70's. He continued to compete in both judo and karate until 1983, when he decided to dedicate himself to Shotokan Karate alone.

In 1984, he invited Teruyuki Okazaki (9th dan ISKF) to Panama for the first time to give an open seminar.

In 1988, Worrell founded the Panamanian Association of Shotokan Karate (Asociacion Panameña de Karate Shotokan), which currently numbers 15 member dojos and is affiliated to the Japan Karate Association - World Federation, of which Worrell is regional representative.

In 2015 he was promoted to 7th Dan by the Japan Karate Association, making him the highest ranking dan recognized by the Association in Central America.

He is a member of the International Society for Krishna Consciousness, where he is known as Ari-Sudana Das.
