= Chōshin Chibana =

Okinawen karateka

Chibana Chōshin
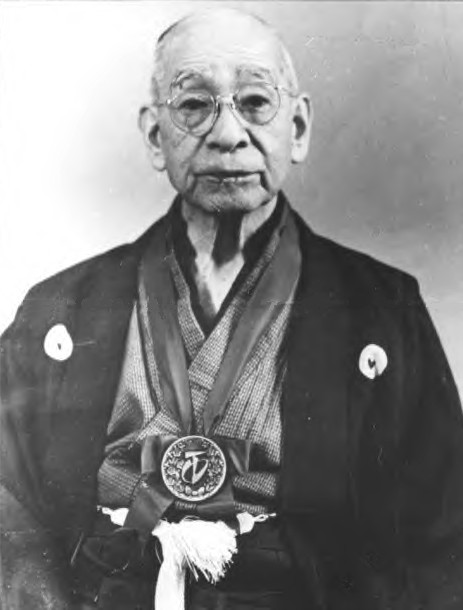
- Born: 5 June 1885; Tottori-cho, Shuri, Okinawa, Japan
- Died: 26 February 1969 (aged 83); Ohama, Japan; Throat cancer
- Style: Shorin-ryū
- Teacher: Ankō Itosu

Other information
- Notable students: Arakaki Ankichi, Katsuya Miyahira, Shūgorō Nakazato, Nakama Chozo, Yuchoku Higa, Eizo Shimabukuro, Joki Uema, Naonobu Ahagon, Yoshihide Shinzato

Chōshin Chibana (知花 朝信, Chibana Chōshin; 5 June 1885 – 26 February 1969) was an Okinawan martial artist who developed Kobayashi Shōrin-ryū karate based on what he had learned from Ankō Itosu. He was the last of the pre-World War karate masters, also called the "Last Warrior of Shuri" He was the first to establish a Japanese ryu name for an Okinawan karate style, calling Itosu's karate "Shorin-Ryu" (小林流 or "the small forest school") in 1929.

== Early years ==
Chibana Chōshin was born as the second son of Chibana Chohaku and wife Nabi on 5 June 1885. The family held a distinguished history and resided in Okinawa's Shuri Tori-Hori village (presently Naha City, Shuri Tori-Hori Town). His family traced their lineage from a branch of the Katsuren Court and Choharu, Prince of Kochinta, fifth son of King Shoshitsu (Tei), but lost their titles and status after Mutsuhito, the Meiji Emperor, banned the caste system in Japan. To support themselves, the family turned to Awamori brewing.

Choshin began his study of martial arts under Ankō Itosu in 1899 when he was about fifteen years old. He applied to be and was accepted as a suitable candidate for instruction, and for thirteen years until he turned 28, Choshin trained under Itosu. When Itosu died at the age of 85, he continued to practice alone for five years, and then opened his first dojo in Tori-hori district at 34. He later opened a second dojo in Kumojo district of Naha City.

== Later career ==
During the World War II Battle of Okinawa, Chibana lost his family, his livelihood, his dojo, a number of students, and nearly his life. He fled the war, but afterward returned to Shuri from Chinen Village and began teaching again. He first taught at Gibo, and later at other sites in the Yamakawa district of Shuri and Naha, eventually relocating his main headquarters (hombu dojo) from Asato to Mihara.

From February 1954 to December 1958, Chibana served as Karate Advisor and Senior Instructor for the Shuri Police Precinct. In May 1956, the Okinawa Karate Federation was formed and he assumed office as its first President. Chibana was associated with Chotoku Kyan, with whom he performed karate demonstrations to promote the Shorin-Ryu style of karate.

By 1957, Chibana had received the title of Hanshi (High Master) from the Dai Nippon Butokukai (The Greater Japan Martial Virtue Association). In 1960, he received the First Sports Award from the Okinawa Times Newspaper for his overall accomplishments in the study and practice of traditional Okinawan Karate-do. On 29 April 1968, was awarded the Order of the Sacred Treasure, 4th Class, by the Emperor of Japan in recognition of his devotion to the study and practice of Okinawan karate-do.

== Later years ==
In 1964, Chibana learned he had terminal throat cancer, but continued to teach students in his dojo. In 1966 he was admitted into Tokyo's Cancer Research Center for radiation treatment and after some improvement, Chibana once again resumed teaching with the assistance of his grandson, Nakazato Akira (Shorin-ryu 7-Dan). By late 1968, his condition worsened and he returned to Ohama Hospital and died at 6:40 a.m. on the 26 February 1969, aged 83.

== See also ==
- Kobayashi Shorin-ryu school founded by Chōshin Chibana.
- Shōrin-ryū Shidōkan school founded by Chibana's student Katsuya Miyahira, Hanshi 10th Dan.
- Shōrin-ryū Kyudōkan school founded by Chibana's student Yuchoku Higa, Hanshi 10th Dan.
- Shorin-ryū Shorinkan school founded by Chibana's student Shūgorō Nakazato, Hanshi, 10th Dan.
- Shōrin-ryū Seibukan school founded by Chotoku Kyan's student Zenryo Shimabukuro, Hanshi 10th Dan.
- Matsubayashi-ryū school founded by Chotoku Kyan's student Shōshin Nagamine, Hanshi 10th Dan.
- Shorin-Ryu Reihokan school founded by Chibana's student Naonobu Ahagon, Hanshi 10th Dan.
- Shubukan Shōrin-ryu school founded by Chibana's student Joki Uema, Hanshi 10th Dan
