= Fukyugata =

Kata practiced in many styles of Okinawan karate, particularly Matsubayashi-ryu

- Other names: Fukyu, Gekisai
- Martial art: Karate
- Place of origin: Okinawa, Japan
- Creator: Shoshin Nagamine and Chojun Miyagi

Fukyugata is the name of a kata practiced in many styles of Okinawan karate, particularly in the Matsubayashi-ryu school of Shorin-ryu, as well as Goju-ryu, where they are termed Gekisai.

== Variations ==
There are two versions of Fukyugata:

1. Shoshin Nagamine (Matsubayashi-ryu) created Fukyugata Ichi
2. Chojun Miyagi (Goju-ryu) created Fukyugata Ni, or Gekisai Dai Ichi

Both were developed as beginner kata because the more traditional kata were seen to be too difficult for beginners. These two kata were commissioned by the special committee of Okinawan Karate-do under Mr. Gen Hayakawa, then governor of the Okinawa Prefecture in 1940. The kata were finished and introduced in 1941 in order to promote a basic and standard kata across a majority of Okinawan Karate styles, however only some styles continue to practice both, or one of these kata.

There are two additional versions with limited acceptance, both described as the "third" Fukyugata:

1. A Fukyugata (Sandan) composed by Sensei Ansei Ueshiro in 1960, consisting of 17 movements; this kata was never adopted in Okinawa Prefecture, and is considered to be a copy of Ananku kata.
2. A Fukyugata composed in c. 2015 to showcase Uechi-ryu technique.

Starting from 2005 during Okinawa Karate Day celebration in Naha every year on October 25 Fukyugata I, II and III are performed by all participants of Karate Parade at Kosoku Dori in the center on Naha as a symbol of recognition of three main styles of Okinawan Karate: Shorin-ryu, Shorei-ryu and Uechi-ryu.

== See also ==
- Karate kata

== Bibliography ==
- Nagamine, Shoshin (1976). The Essence of Okinawan Karate. Tuttle Martial Arts. ISBN 0-8048-2110-0.
- Cummins, William; Scaglione, Robert (1984). The Shorin-Ryu Okinawan Karate Question and Answer Book. ISBN 9780804814263.
- Hokama, Tetsuhiro (2009). History and Traditions of Okinawan Karate. Masters. ISBN 0920129196.
