= Shojiro Sugiyama =

Japanese karate instructor

- Sugiyama Sensei (June, 2004)
- Born: November 16, 1929; Tokyo, Japan
- Died: June 25, 2015 (aged 85); Chicago, United States
- Style: Shotokan

Shojiro Sugiyama (November 16, 1929 – June 25, 2015) was a Japanese karate instructor. In 1954, after training in two other styles of karate, he began studying with the Japan Karate Association of Tokyo (Yotsuya). He was invited to come to Chicago, U.S. to teach karate in 1963. Through the late 60's and 70's, Sugiyama Sensei is credited with building and promoting Shotokan karate throughout the entire midwest region. Many of his original students have gone on to create their own dojos throughout Illinois, Iowa, Indiana, Michigan and Wisconsin. In recent years, Sugiyama has increased his focus towards the use and development of ki (Chinese, Qi), in order to improve karate training and create a radar system for martial artists.

== Published work ==
Cover Art	Title	Year Published	ISBN
11 Innovations	11 Innovations in Karate	2005	ISBN 978-0-9669048-3-3
25 Shotokan Kata	25 Shoto-Kan Kata	1984	ISBN 978-0-9669048-0-2
Aura Ki & Healing	Aura, Ki, and Healing	2002	ISBN 978-0-9669048-4-0
	Kitoh Karate	1994	
	Karate, Synchronization of Body and Mind	1977	
	Kumite-gata	1993	
	Basic Principles of Karate	1991	
