= Thomas Carroll (martial artist) =

American martial artist

- Born: February 7, 1938; South Carolina
- Died: March 20, 1999 (aged 61)
- Style: Shotokan karate, Kenpō
- Fighting out of: New York City, U.S.

Thomas "Lapuppet" Carroll, (7 February 1938 – 20 March 1999) was a pioneer African-American martial artist, and also a member of USA Karate Hall of Fame, and the Black Belt Hall of Fame. of Brooklyn, New York. He was also a member of the US Ju-Jitsu Federation, but focussed on Shotokan karate. Carrol died from cancer in March 1999.

== Early life ==
Thomas Carroll LaPuppet born in South Carolina in 1938, and died on March 23, 1999. He was raised in Brooklyn graduating from Franklin K. Lane High School. He then went on to attend the State University of New York in Westbury, New York but did not graduate from there due to his belief that "The University of the street" provided a more dynamic education. Thomas Carrol worked as a firefighter for the New York City Fire Department and was also in the United States Marine Corps achieving the rank of First Sergeant.

== Martial arts career ==
Carrol was a former jiujitsu practitioner before learning Karate under George Cofield. Carroll was a member of the USA Karate Hall of Fame, chairman of USA Karate New York as Treasurer, and holding positions as head coach. He was key in getting karate recognized by the International Olympic Committee. Considered by some to be an American martial arts pioneer he defeated many famous martial artists including Bill "Superfoot" Wallace in tournaments. He also trained actors Gregory Hines and Ralph Macchio of Karate Kid. He is considered to be a contemporary of Chuck Norris and Joe Lewis An 8th degree blackbelt he was inducted into the Black Belt Hall of Fame in 1969. Thomas was also featured in various magazines including Black Belt Magazine and Official Karate Magazine. He finished his career as an 8th degree black belt. A big fan of his was Steve Anderson (karate)

== Movie career ==
He acted in the 1976 movie The Super Weapon, which also starred Ron van Clief. He was also in the movie Angel With a Kick.

He is also featured training youth in the 1976 documentary The Warrior Within.
