= John Giordano (martial artist) =

American martial artist

John Giordano is an American martial artist and currently practices holistic alternative medicine. He began teaching the martial art karate style Nisei Gōjū-ryū in Florida in 1965. Giordano taught karate to disabled people and women alongside men.

== Personal life ==
Giordano spent his childhood in the South Bronx in New York City. His father was sent to prison when Giordano was 8 years old for selling drugs, but Giordano was told that his father was on a sales trip. He was molested by children in his neighborhood when he was nearing 9 years old. When he was 14, Giordano was a part of a gang until he decided to learn karate, later moving to Florida where he taught the martial art.

== Career ==
Giordano and Grandmaster Frank Ruiz taught martial arts to jazz drummer Abbey Rader in 1964. He was an instructor of the martial art karate style Nisei Gōjū-ryū and brought it to Miami Beach, Florida, in 1965. He started a dojo for the karate style when there were barely any such styles in that area. To demonstrate karate to audiences, Giordano started a new concept named the karate play. The play showed the physical and spiritual parts of the martial art by having people dress up and wear makeup. The first play was held in September 1973 in a Miami Beach auditorium and it focused on karate, kung fu, nunchakus, and other weapons. The plays with white makeup and weapons were similar to kabuki theatre. Alex Ben Block said in The Miami News, "It mixes sports and show business as openly as pro football, but on a considerably smaller budget, and without the team feeling." Giordano has worked with the Bureau with the Blind in Miami Beach to teach karate to blind people. Students of Giordano included people who were 60% blind and 90% blind. His 1970s dojo allowed women to train with men due to him being an advocate for equal martial arts training. Giordano started a series of professional karate matches for women in the 1970s. He said, "We are holding this tournament because we believe women have never been given a chance to compete professionally, and we believe, fairly matched against other women with full safety equipment and under strict supervision, they have as much right, and as much talent as men." His students also included people with other disabilities. Psychologist and martial artist Dirk W. Mosig named Giordano as one of the top fighters in Florida in January 1972. John Platero of the Associated Press wrote a 1987 story about Giordano training David Jainchill, a 50-year-old man who was legally blind, who was able to succeed in karate as a black belt.

Giordano used to be a drug addict and founded G & G Holistic Treatment Center in North Miami Beach, Florida. He founded The National Institute for Holistic Addiction Studies and is a co-founder the Alliance for Addiction Solutions. WebMD named Giordano as an expert in their article "Is Crack More Addictive Than Coke?". Giordano contributed to 80 peer reviewed, addiction related scientific research papers. He has continued his mental health work by helping to pioneer psychedelic therapy that utilizes Ketamine, Ibogaine and MDMA. Implementing and advising on these treatments at the Ketamine and Wellness Clinic of South Florida which he Co-Founded and advising NuMind Health as the Chief Knowledge Officer. Giordano hosts his own Podcast "Beat Your Addictions" and was interviewed on the podcast "Louder Than Silence" which is sponsored by The National Foundation to End Child Abuse and Neglect.

Giordano co-authored the book Molecular Neurobiology of Addiction Recovery, The 12 Steps Program and Fellowship with Kenneth Blum, John Femino, Scott Teitelbaum, Marlene Oscar-Berman, Mark Gold. Additionally, he is the author of two books: How to Beat Your Addictions and Live a Quality Life and The Kid From The South Bronx Who Never Gave Up.
