= Joe Lewis (martial artist) =

American martial artist and actor (1944–2012)

- Born: Joseph Henry Lewis; March 7, 1944; Knightdale, North Carolina, U.S.
- Died: August 31, 2012 (aged 68); Coatesville, Pennsylvania, U.S.
- Height: 6 ft 0 in (1.83 m)
- Weight: 195 lb (88 kg; 13.9 st)
- Style: Shōbayashi Shōrin-ryū Karate, Matsubayashi-ryū Karate, Tracy’s Kenpo,Kickboxing, Boxing Jeet Kune Do, Ryukyu Kenpo, Tai chi, Judo, Folkstyle wrestling
- Stance: Orthodox
- Trainer: Eizo Shimabukuro, Chinsaku Kinjo, Seiyu Oyata, Edmund K. Parker, Bruce Lee, Joe Orbillo, Clifford Jewell, Gordon Doversola, Sugar Ray Robinson, Dan Inosanto, Elvis Presley
- Years active: 1965–2012

Kickboxing record
- Total: 21
- Wins: 16
- By knockout: 14
- Losses: 4
- By knockout: 1
- Draws: 1

Joe Lewis (March 7, 1944 – August 31, 2012) was an American martial artist, professional kickboxer and actor. Originally a practitioner of Shōrin-ryū karate and champion in point sparring competitions, he became one of the fathers of full contact karate and kickboxing in the United States, and is credited with popularizing the combat sport in North America.

As a fighter, Lewis gained fame for his matches in the 1960s and 1970s, and was nicknamed "the Muhammad Ali of karate." He has twice been voted the greatest fighter in karate history, having won several karate tournaments, and has attained the titles of "United States Heavyweight Kickboxing Champion," "World Heavyweight Full Contact Karate Champion," and "United States National Black Belt Kata Champion." Though initially trained and primarily known as a karateka, Lewis cross-trained in several other martial arts, including Ryukyu Kenpo, boxing, judo, jeet kune do, tai chi, and folkstyle wrestling.

His friend and training partner Bruce Lee coined him "The Greatest Karate Fighter of All Time." He was also named by the STAR System World Kickboxing Ratings as the "STAR Historic Undisputed Heavyweight World Champion" and is credited on their site as the "Father of Modern Kickboxing". He competed professionally from 1965 to 1983, with a 16–4–1 record and 14 wins by knockout.

== Early life and training ==
Joseph Henry Lewis was born on March 7, 1944, in Knightdale, North Carolina. He is of Welsh and Scottish ancestry. In 1962, Lewis enlisted in the US Marine Corps. He was stationed at Marine Corps Air Station Cherry Point in Havelock, North Carolina from July 20, 1962, to April 12, 1964. He studied Shōrin-ryū Karate with Eizo Shimabukuro, John Korab, Chinsaku Kinjo, and Seiyu Oyata while stationed in Okinawa between May 21, 1964, and November 29, 1965, earning his black belt in seven months. He was one of the first Marines stationed in Vietnam; there, he met Rocky Graziano.

From February 7 to July 14, 1966, he was stationed at Marine Corps Base Camp Lejeune, North Carolina, during which he was released from active duty. Upon returning to the US, he began a winning tournament career. From 1967 to 1968, he studied privately with the influential Wing-Chun kung fu teacher, Jeet Kune Do founder, and Chinese/Hollywood movie legend Bruce Lee.

Hong Kong cinema historian Bey Logan says Lewis was the original pick of Bruce Lee for the villain Colt in Way of the Dragon, but that Lee and Lewis either had a falling out or Lewis had a scheduling conflict, and thus Chuck Norris was tapped instead.

== Karate career ==
In 1966, with only 22 months of training, Lewis won the grand championship of the first tournament he entered, the U.S. Nationals, promoted by Jhoon Rhee. Lewis defeated seven opponents before defeating Thomas Carroll by a 2–0 decision. Lewis reigned as the U.S. Nationals grand champion from 1966 to 1969. At the 1967 Nationals in Washington, Lewis won the championship by defeating Mitchell Bobrow in the semi-final and beating Frank Hargrove 3–2 in the finals. Previously, Lewis defeated Hargrove in New York City at 'Henry Cho's Karate Tournament'. During that time he was also defeated by Chuck Norris.

In 1966, at the Long Beach Internationals, Lewis lost an upset decision to Allen Steen. In 1967, Lewis defeated Chuck Norris's brother Wieland Norris, Steve LaBounty, and Frank Knoll, as well as Frank Hargrove for the third time.

At the 1968 'Orient vs. U.S. Tournament', promoted by Aaron Banks, Lewis lost to Japanese-American N. Tanaka. At the 'First Professional Karate Tournament' in Dallas, Texas, Lewis won the championship trophy by decisioning Larry Whitner, Phil Ola, and Skipper Mullins.

In February 1968, Lewis, along with Bob Wall, Skipper Mullins, J. Pat Burleson, David Moon, and Fred Wren, fought in the first World Professional Karate Championships (WPKC) promoted by Jim Harrison. This was the first "professional" tournament in karate history, and took place in Harrison's dojo in Kansas City. The rules allowed "heavy contact." Lewis won the tournament and was paid one dollar, officially making him the first professional champion in karate history. In August 1968, Lewis was defeated by Victor Moore at the World's Hemisphere Karate Championships, the second professional karate tournament in history, which took place in San Antonio, Texas and was promoted by Robert Trias and Atlee Chittim. Moore and Lewis split the championship purse of $1,000. The same year, Lewis defeated Louis Delgado, who had beaten Chuck Norris the year before. On November 24, 1968, at the Waldorf Astoria Hotel in New York City, Lewis won Aaron Banks' World Professional Karate Championships by defeating Victor Moore to win the World Heavyweight Title, and was paid $600.

In 1970, Lewis lost in an upset to John Natividad at the All-Star Team Championships in Long Beach, California. At the 'Battle of Atlanta', which was promoted by Joe Corley, Joe Lewis defeated Mitchell Bobrow in a closely contested come-from-behind victory for the Heavyweight Championship, and Joe Hayes for the Grand Championship.

At Ed Parker's 1972 'International Karate Championships', Darnell Garcia scored an upset victory over Lewis. That same year, at the 1972 Grande Nationals in Memphis Tennessee, Joe Lewis beat Jerry Piddington and won his grande title match in a 1–0 victory.

1974 marked Lewis' final year in tournament karate competition. In May, he lost to Charles Curry in New York at the Hidy Ochiai National Karate Tournament. That same month, Lewis won the PAWAK tournament, which lasted from May 11 to May 12. Lewis scored victories over Frank Harvey, Smiley Urquidez, Benny Urquidez, and Cecil Peoples in the elimination matches, and won the championship with a 4–3 points decision over Steve Sanders. Finally, at Mike Anderson's, 'Top 10 National Professional Karate Tournament', Lewis lost to Everett "Monster Man" Eddy in the finals.

In 1983, Lewis was voted by top fighters and promoters as the greatest karate fighter of all time, with Chuck Norris and Bill Wallace tied for second place. Gene Lebell has credited Joe as the person who "brought us full-contact karate."

Lewis was a veteran of the Vietnam War, where he served in the communications field. His military decorations include Marine Corps Good Conduct Medal, National Defense Service Medal, Armed Forces Expeditionary Medal, and "Expert" Rifle Badge. He acted in films and on TV, and was briefly married to actress Barbara Leigh. Throughout his life, he continued to give seminars and work in the entertainment industry.

== Kickboxing and full-contact karate career ==
Starting in 1967, Lewis began training privately with Bruce Lee and former heavyweight boxing contender Joe Orbillo.

In late 1969, promoter Lee Faulkner contacted Lewis to fight in his upcoming United States Karate Championships. By this time, Lewis had retired from point fighting, but agreed to fight if Faulkner would promote a full-contact karate bout with Lewis and an opponent who would fight to the knockout, which Faulkner agreed to. The match took place on January 17, 1970. As Lewis and Greg Baines entered the ring wearing boxing gloves, the announcer identified them as "kickboxers". That night, Lewis won the first-ever kickboxing bout in North America with a second-round knockout over Baines. Prior to this, Lewis defeated Chuck Lemmons in point karate at the US Pro Team Karate finals.

On June 20, 1970, in Dallas, Texas, Lewis defended his United States Kickboxing Association heavyweight title against "Big" Ed Daniel at the U.S.A. Professional Open Karate Championships, which was promoted by Lee Faulkner and Allen Steen. Daniels had a background in professional wrestling and amateur boxing as well as a black belt from Lewis' original teacher; he was also a police officer at the time. Lewis knocked out Daniel in 2 rounds, and in 3 rounds in a later rematch.

On January 24, 1971, at the 2nd Annual United Nations Open Karate Championships, which was promoted by Aaron Banks, Lewis knocked out Ronnie Barkoot. At another Banks promotion; United States Championship Kickboxing Bouts, Lewis scored a 3rd-round knockout over "Atlas" Jesse King. In total, Lewis defended his United States Heavyweight Kickboxing title with 8 straight knockouts between 1970 and 1971.

Lewis was the first kickboxer to be featured in both The Ring boxing magazine and Sports Illustrated. During this time, promoter Lee Faulkner unsuccessfully attempted to organize a legitimate "world" title fight between him and a Thai kickboxing champion.

By the end of 1971, interest in kickboxing had hit an all-time low, with promoters unable to attract crowds to a kickboxing event. Lewis retired as undefeated United States Heavyweight Kickboxing champion in 1971. His record as the undisputed United States heavyweight kickboxing champion was a perfect 10–0 with 10 KO's.

On September 14, 1974, on ABC's Wide World of Entertainment promoter Mike Anderson introduced PKA 'full-contact' karate. In the bouts, competitors wore foam hand and foot protection and fought to the knockout. In 1974, Lewis beat his only opponent in the new sport of full contact karate with a 2nd round ridge hand knockout over Yugoslavia's Frank Brodar in Los Angeles, California to win the Professional Karate Association (PKA) Heavyweight full-contact karate title.

The original 1974 PKA world champions, including Lewis (heavyweight), Jeff Smith (light heavyweight) and Bill 'Superfoot' Wallace (middleweight) received fanfare from the PKA title wins and publicity in popular martial arts magazines, establishing their status as "legends of the karate world". Lewis advanced his public persona the next year by appearing on the cover of Playgirl magazine. In 1975, Lewis was inducted into the Black Belt magazine's Hall of Fame as the 1974 full contact karate "fighter of the year".

In a 1975 comeback fight in Hawaii, Lewis lost a three-round decision (non title) to Teddy Limoz in Hawaii, and in September, he lost a 7-round decision to Ross Scott after suffering a dislocated shoulder. Lewis was stripped of the PKA World Heavyweight championship title after contract disputes. In 1977, Lewis was the martial arts coordinator of the movie Circle of Iron, and continued his acting career by starring in Jaguar Lives in 1978 and Force: Five in 1981.

In 1983, Lewis launched a comeback which saw him earn a top-10 PKA world ranking. After neglecting an extended training time to begin his comeback for a title, Lewis defeated T. Morrison by KO, decisioned Charleton Young and Curtis Crandall, and knocked out Melvin Cole. On April 16, Lewis lost a decision to Tom Hall in an upset. On August 10, Lewis suffered a 4th round stoppage due to another cut to US heavyweight champion Kerry Roop for the PKA US heavyweight title. Lewis retired after the defeat, with his competitive career in kickboxing and PKA full-contact karate ending with a combined record of 17 wins and 4 losses with 15 wins obtained by knockout, a K.O ratio of 71.4% The PKA World title record was 5 wins 4 losses.

In 1990, Lewis fought an exhibition kickboxing/karate match with friend Bill Wallace (166 lbs) on pay per view. Both Lewis and Wallace were refused a boxing license because of their age. Though it was only an exhibition, many people believed it was the main event of the night due to the publicity it attracted. The fight was billed "Speed vs Power". The exhibition ended with two judges scoring a tie and one judge giving the fight to Wallace in the exhibition event. Lewis later recounted that he was warned not to cross the line with Wallace, as he had a 30-pound advantage against him. Lewis fought one last exhibition bout in 1991 against former world champion boxer Leon Spinks in a boxer vs. kickboxer mixed match which ended in a draw.

== Fighting style ==
Joe Lewis' main characteristic as a fighter was his strength, which came from weight lifting and collegiate wrestling in his youth. He was considered an intimidating presence in the karate tournament scene due to having both strength and speed. In later years, Joe would be able to replicate some of Bruce Lee's legendary speed feats, such as asking a volunteer to block his punches, which would prove too fast to be blocked. As a karate point fighter, Lewis was famous for his lead side kick, particularly his left. At one point, his response to on-lookers who asked why he only used that technique was "Why not? They can't block it." He also developed a fast back fist punch; if it failed, he would grab his opponent's dogi and use the reverse punch instead.

After cross-training in boxing with Sugar Ray Robinson and Joe Orbillio and then training Jeet Kune Do with Bruce Lee, Lewis gained a unique view on how to handle distance and closing the gap. Due to his Shōrin-ryū style, Lewis often adopted a bladed, or sideways, stance with his lead arm held low and his rear arm held higher like crab style boxers. Lewis stated that Bruce Lee had learned this stance from him and incorporated it into his movies. His preferred techniques as a full contact karate and kickboxing fighter focused on using the lead side as much as possible, using the lead leg roundhouse kick, the jab, and the lead leg side kick. He also used a rear reverse punch, lunge punch and hook. Lewis primarily focused on speedy initial moves instead of combinations. Though he did use some combinations such as a double right hook punch which he learned from Bruce Lee.

He also claimed that it was typical of his style to use low kicks as early as his first kickboxing bout against Greg Baines, and once referred to them as his "main weapon". Thanks to his background as a wrestler and studying of several types of fighting, such as Shōrin-ryū Karate, Okinawan Kenpo, Judo, Jeet Kune Do, Boxing and Tai Chi, Lewis was a well-rounded fighter.

As a teacher, Lewis was devoted to instructing martial artists in the Five Angles of Attack and other principles, which he learned from Bruce Lee and then modified through his full contact experience.

== Movie roles ==
Hong Kong cinema historian Bey Logan says Lewis was the original pick of Bruce Lee to play Colt in the 1972 martial-arts action film Way of the Dragon, but as a result of either Lee and Lewis having a falling out or Lewis having a scheduling conflict, Chuck Norris was chosen instead.

Joe Lewis co-stars alongside Robin Shou as Mister Kent in the B-movie Bloodfight 2: The Deathcage, a 1989 sequel to Bloodfight: Final Fight that was released on the same year.

== Health issues and death ==
Early in July 2011, Lewis was diagnosed with a malignant brain tumor and was told he would have six to eight weeks to live without surgery. He underwent surgery on July 18 to remove the tumor.

Lewis died on the morning of August 31, 2012, at Coatesville Veterans Affairs Medical Center in Coatesville, Pennsylvania, at the age of 68. The cancer had spread to his left shoulder and hip prior to his death. He was buried at Knightdale Baptist Church Cemetery in Knightdale, Wake County, North Carolina.

== Legacy ==
Lewis left behind his own system of martial arts teaching; the Joe Lewis American Karate Systems, which focuses on full-contact fighting. Due to his role in developing and promoting the sport's first event in the American continent, Lewis is considered to be the "Father of Kickboxing" in the western world, and has also been called "the man who brought us Full Contact Karate." Black Belt Magazine describes his process of solo training in boxing and combining those techniques with his karate techniques as "the result is the martial sport now known as Kickboxing." His efforts in these fields eventually resulted in the Mixed martial arts competition of today.

In the cover story "The Passing of the Torch Legendary Fighter Joe Lewis Grooms His Successors" for the February 1993 issue of Black Belt, Lewis stated that his proteges John and Jim Graden were his choice to carry the torch of his system after his death.

== In popular culture ==
Ken Masters from the Street Fighter series was based upon Lewis' likeness and career, both being Americans who learned traditional karate styles in Japan then returned home to become United States champion to worldwide acclaim. Masters' characteristic red uniform and blond hair were patterned after a popular cover in which Joe Lewis appeared sporting that same look. Like how Lewis' personal mixture of karate, boxing and Jeet Kune Do showcases the eclectic approach some American martial artists took towards more traditional martial arts, Masters sports a flashier fighting style than Ryu. The American kickboxer, Joe, from the first Street Fighter game, was also seemingly based on Lewis.

Lewis is indirectly referenced in a scene from the 2019 Quentin Tarantino film Once Upon a Time in Hollywood when Bruce Lee (played by Mike Moh) refers to him as "[T]hat white kickboxing a--hole." to differentiate him from the boxer Joe Louis.

== Kickboxing record ==
Kickboxing record
16 wins (14 KOs), 4 losses, 1 draw
Date	Result	Opponent	Event	Location	Method	Round	Time	Record	Notes
October 8, 1983	Loss	(United States) Kerry Roop		Akron, Ohio, USA	TKO (cut)	4		16–4	For PKA US Heavyweight title.
July 16, 1983	Win	(United States) Melvin Cole		Atlanta, Georgia, USA	TKO (referee stoppage)	4	1:57	16–3	
April 17, 1983	Loss	(United States) Tom Hall		Atlantic City, New Jersey, USA	Decision (unanimous)			15–3	
March 19, 1983	Win	(United States) Charlton Young	Battle of Atlanta Karate Championships	Atlanta, Georgia, USA	Decision	7	3:00	15–2	
February 4, 1983	Win	(United States) Curtis Crandall		Charlotte, North Carolina, USA	Decision	6	3:00	14–2	
December 9, 1982	Win	(United States) Bill Morrison (kickboxer)		Greenville, North Carolina, USA	KO	3		13–2	
August 24, 1975	Loss	(United States) Ross Scott		Atlantic City, New Jersey, USA	Decision	7	3:00	12–2	
July 26, 1975	Loss	(United States) Teddy Limoz	World Series of Martial Arts Championships	Honolulu, Hawaii, USA	Decision	3	3:00	12–1	For WSMAC Openweight World title. Loses PKA Heavyweight World title.
July 26, 1975	Win	(United States) Ron Clay	World Series of Martial Arts Championships	Honolulu, Hawaii, USA	KO (punches)	1	1:55	12–0	
September 14, 1974	Win	(Socialist Federal Republic of Yugoslavia) Franc Brodar		Los Angeles, California, USA	KO (ridge hand)	2		11–0	Wins PKA Heavyweight World title.
1974	Win	(United States) Herbie Thompson	Florida State Karate Championships	Florida, USA	TKO (retirement)	2		10–0	
1971	Win	(United States) Victor Moore		Kansas City, Kansas, USA	KO			9–0	
1971	Win	Bob Smith		St. Louis, Missouri, USA	KO	2		8–0	Defends USKA Heavyweight title.
1971	Win	(United States) Ed Daniel		Houston, Texas, USA	KO (body kick)	3		7–0	Defends USKA Heavyweight title.
June 23, 1971	Win	(United States) Jesse King	US Championship Kickboxing	New York City, New York, USA	KO	2	2:30	6–0	Rematch on same night. Defends USKA Heavyweight title.
June 23, 1971	Win	(United States) Jesse King	US Championship Kickboxing	New York City, New York, USA	KO	1		5–0	Defends USKA Heavyweight title.
January 21, 1971	Win	(United States) Norman Barkoot	2nd United Nations Open Karate Championships	New York City, New York, USA	KO	1	1:25	4–0	Defends USKA Heavyweight title.
1970	Win	(Canada) Wally Slocki	Toronto Karate Championships	Toronto, Ontario, Canada	KO (knee)	3	0:25	3–0	
June 20, 1970	Win	(United States) Ed Daniel	US Pro Open Karate Championships	Dallas, Texas, USA	KO	2	1:00	2–0	Defends USKA Heavyweight title.
January 17, 1970	Win	(United States) Greg Baines	US Pro Team Karate Championships	Long Beach, California, USA	KO (punches)	2	0:59	1–0	Wins USKA Heavyweight title.
Legend: Win Loss Draw/No contest

== See also ==
- List of male kickboxers
- United States Kickboxing Association
- Professional Karate Association
- Joe Lewis Memorial Page
