= Chinte =

Karate technique

Chinte (珍手) (Japanese: "Rare Hand" or "Unusual Hand") is a kata practiced in Shotokan, Shito-ryu and in Okinawan Shorin-ryu Kyudokan. It is a very old kata originating from China. Its mixture of standard movements and rarely seen techniques, vestiges of ancient forms, give this kata a special appeal. Particularly dynamic, with its alternating strong and slow passages, Chinte is unique also in the presence of a number of circular techniques, despite the preference in Shotokan karate for linear movements. It is a kata of close-distance self-defense techniques. The somewhat peculiar closing movements allude to the absorption of the power of the waves by the sand, which is a symbol of the return to tranquility after the violent storm.

Some believe the final three movements of the Shotokan version, a series of backwards hops, were added to bring the kata back to the original starting place in order to facilitate competition, because they are not present in the other versions of the kata practiced by other styles of Japanese Karate. Alternatively, it could be that the final movements were dropped by other styles because their meaning was lost. One interpretation of the final movements is that an opponent's grab to one's chest is secured and then the hops are used to apply one's body weight to break his wrist. In Seiyo Shorin-Ryu Karate, the last three hops are replaced by taitoshi (body leg drop) followed with a series of blocks, a kick and punch.

== Bibliography ==
- Redmond, R. Kata: The Folk Dances of Shotokan, 2006
