= Shinpan Gusukuma =

Okinawan karateka

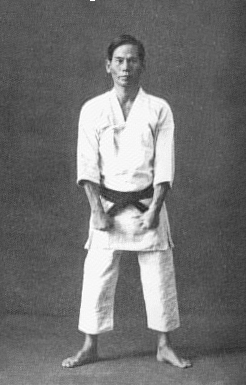
- Born: 1890; Taira Town (Taira-chō), Shuri, Okinawa, Japan
- Died: 1954 (aged 63–64); Naminoue-gū, Naha, USCAR, present-day Okinawa
- Other names: Shinpan Shiroma
- Style: Shorin-ryū
- Teacher(s): Ankō Itosu, Higaonna Kanryō

Other information
- Notable students: Seiichi Iju

Shinpan Gusukuma (城間 真繁, Shiroma Shinpan; 1890–1954), read as Shinpan Shiroma in Japanese, was an Okinawan martial artist who studied Shōrin-ryū karate as a student of Ankō Itosu. Gusukuma also trained under Higaonna Kanryō in the Naha-te style. Gusukuma went on to establish Shitō-ryū with Kenwa Mabuni.

== Early years ==
Gusukuma Shinpan born in 1890 in the town of Taira in Shuri, Okinawa. At the age of thirteen, he began the study of karate with Anko Itosu, and in 1908 he began training with Kanryo Higaonna, along with Kenwa Mabuni. In 1909 at the age of eighteen, Shipan was inducted into the Japanese Navy. He became a school teacher by profession and worked as a professor in the Shuri Dai Ichi Elementary School where he also taught karate. He was also known for his skills as an acupuncturist and taught the art.

Shinpan began teaching Shorin-ryu shortly after World War II and was associated with Miyagi Chojun, Kyoda Jyuhatsu and Kyan Chotoku. He taught regularly at Shuri Castle and had a dojo at his home in Nishihara, Okinawa.

On Okinawa, there were two branches of Shito-Ryu, one founded by Shinpan Shiroma and the other by Kenwa Mabuni. Because he continued to maintain schools only in Okinawa, Shinpan created the only known Okinawan branch of Shitō-ryū. He established an organization called the Shinpan Shiroma Shito-ryu Preservation Society to assist with his teaching and served as president.

== 3 Karate Foundational Principles ==
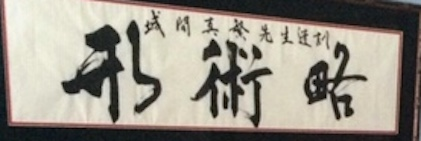

Gusukuma outlined the three foundational principles of karate as kata, jutsu, and ryaku. Without all three, the martial application is lost.

Kata is the foundational form by which the body develops proper posture, breathing, balance, flexibility, and unified muscle/tendon/hip control for maximum outpower.

Jutsu encompasses the bunkai or analysis of the martial techniques; only some of which are derived from kata. Over time, these techniques become muscle memory. Almost all kata movements have multiple bunkai, but bunkai is not limited to kata analysis nor the bunkai of the curriculum.

Ryaku is the “abbreviation”, used in this context to describe the actual application of technique. It is represented in the spontaneous free-flowing of movements as counters to attacks. Oyo bunkai in the curriculum is a baby step toward ryaku; moving from block printing to cursive, yet still within the “wording” of kata. Ryaku is free composition based upon the “theme” of kata.

Sensei Seikichi Iha, 10th Dan, Shidokan Karate, a student of Gusukuma's, reminds us that it is the responsibility of the dedicated student to seek out partners for the exploration of jutsu and ryaku. There we find the joy of exploration.

== Final years ==
Shinpan suffered during the Battle of Okinawa and lost many of his students, but after World War II, he reopened his dojo in Shuri.

Shinpan died in 1954 at the age of 64. He taught class and trained for two hours on the day of his death, ate a light dinner and went to bed early. Three hours later his wife found that he had died in his sleep. His student Horoku Ishikawa continued his branch of Shito-ryu.
