= Gojūshiho =

Kata practised in karate

- Other names: Useishi, Sushiho, Hotaku, O Sip Sa Bo
- Martial art: Karate, Tang Soo Do

Gojūshiho (五十四歩, lit. 54 steps) is a kata practiced in karate. Gojushiho was developed by Sokon Matsumura, one of the key founders of Okinawan martial arts and named it "Uesheishi", which literally means 54 methods in Chinese. In some styles of karate, there are two versions of this kata - Gojūshiho Shō and Gojūshiho Dai. An advantage of the two versions of the kata is to better master the difficult techniques presented therein, but not without facing some confusion, for many sequences are the same and others only slightly different. The embusen of both Gojūshiho Shō and Gojūshiho Dai are nearly identical. Gojūshiho Shō begins straight off with a wide variety of advanced techniques and, as such, is highly recommended for study. Gojūshiho Dai consists of many advanced open-handed techniques and attacks to the collar-bone.

Gojushiho movement is quite similar to Aikido grappling technique in terms of flowing knife hand or "tate-shuto-uke" or vertical knife hand block. "Tate-shuto-uke" does not resemble other shuto uke which resemble as "block technique". Rather it was throwing technique in "aiki-jujutsu". Another "shuto" technique as "shuto-nagashi-uke" or "knife-hand-flowing-block" has become the unique characteristic of Gojushiho because of flowing movement which is not merely interpreted as "block", but "throw".

Gojūshiho Shō and Gojūshiho Dai are two versions in Shotokan of the Shōrin-ryū kata called Useishi (54) or Gojūshiho. The oft-repeated story about the JKA having to rename the Gojushiho kata due to a tournament mix-up; and Kanazawa Hirokazu, because of his seniority, keeping the original names in his SKIF organisation is without foundation. In fact, Kanazawa is on record as saying that when he formed SKIF he changed the names of the two kata as he felt the “sho” designation suited the smaller, more difficult, kata better. Kanazawa also mentioned this kata was introduced into the JKA before its sibling, and this explained why the JKA decided to call it “dai” when they introduced the second Gojushiho into the syllabus.

This kata is also practiced in Tang Soo Do and is called O Sip Sa Bo in Korean. It is said it also has some influences of Ng Ying Kungfu (Chinese: 五形功夫). Due to its difficulty, this kata is often reserved for advanced students, usually for those who are 6th degree black belts and above.

Gojushiho is also practiced in Goshin Kagen Goju Karate, a modified style of Goju founded by Hanshi Gerald Thomson

== See also ==
- Bunkai
- Karate kata
