= Shūgorō Nakazato =

Okinawan karateka

- Born: August 14, 1920; Shuri, Okinawa, Japan
- Died: August 24, 2016 (aged 96)
- Style: Shōrin-ryū
- Teachers: Chōshin Chibana; Seiichi Iju; Masami Chinen; Seiro Tonaki
- Rank: Hanshi, 10th Dan

Other information
- Notable students: Tadashi Yamashita, Eddie B. Bethea, Jr., Kazumasa Yokoyama, Ernest J. Estrada, Sokuichi Gibu, Suresh Kenichira, C.D. Williamson, Frank D. Hargrove
- Notable club: North American Shorinkan Lineage
- Notable schools: Karate School of Virginia Beach, Dojos under Shugoro Nakazato's Organization

Shūgorō Nakazato (仲里 周五郎, Nakazato Shūgorō; August 14, 1920 – August 24, 2016) was an Okinawan martial artist. Described as a "one punch artist" by some of his American students, Nakazato developed his karate sparring into "a fine fighting art". He gave many demonstrations in Japan as well as abroad and had "many well-known students in the USA", Nakazato was designated as an "intangible cultural asset holder" by Okinawa Prefecture in 2000. He was awarded the Order of the Rising Sun, 5th Class with Gold and Silver Rays on November 4, 2007.

== Training ==
He first started karate training in 1935 under Seiichi Iju (a former student of Shinpan Shiroma) at Minato ward, Sakai City, Osaka, staying with him until 1940. At the same time (i.e. 1936-1940), Nakazato trained in the kobudo weapons bo, sai, nunchaku, tonfa and nichokama, under Seiro Tonaki who was only a little older than himself and had at one time been a student of Sanda Chinen.

In 1942, Nakazato joined the Japanese army, where he taught bayonet and military discipline to new recruits on the mainland. At the war's end, he returned to Okinawa to become a student of Chosin Chibana, whom he considered to be the "most eminent karate master of that time". In 1951 Nakazato helped Chibana open a dojo called Dai Ichi Dojo. After receiving his shihan license from Chibana in 1955, Nakazato opened his dojo at Aja, near Naha, calling it Nakazato Dojo. In the same year, Nakazato resumed bojutsu training, this time under Seiro Tonaki's teacher's son, Masami Chinen, with whom he stayed until 1958.

== Later life and death ==
Nakazato taught many karate kata: Kihon Ippon, Kihon Nihon, Kihon Sanbon, Fukyu no Kata, Naihanchi Shodan, Naihanchi Nidan, Naihanchi Sandan, Pinan Shodan, Pinan Nidan, Pinan Sandan, Pinan Yondan, Pinan Godan, Passai Sho, Passai Dai, Kusanku Sho, Chinto, Kusanku Dai, and Gojushiho. Nakazato also created multiple weapons kata as well as the open hand form, Gorin Kata. Nakazato died August 24, 2016, at the age of 96 of aspiration pneumonia.
