= Higa Yuchoku =

Japanese karateka

- Historical photo of Higa Yuchoku
- Born: February 8, 1910; Naha, Okinawa
- Died: November 4, 1994 (aged 84); Naha, Okinawa
- Style: Shorin-ryu karate
- Teachers: Choshin Chibana, Miyagi Chojun, Jinnan Shinzato, Seiei Miyahira
- Rank: 10th dan karate, Hanshi

Yuchoku Higa (1910–1994) was a Japanese Shorin-ryu karate master who was awarded Hanshi (10th dan) in 1976. He was a politician served as a Naha City Council member and a chair of the Naha City Council.

== Biography ==
In 1927, he began training under Jiro Shiroma who was a student of Higa's father In 1934, under Jinan Shinzato he began training te and Goju-ryu. In 1948 he began studies under Chōshin Chibana and in 1965 was awarded 9th dan by Chibana.

He served as president of the Okinawa Prefecture Karatedo Federation and the All Okinawa Karatedo Federation. In 1976 he received the rank of Hanshi, 10th Dan.
