= Zenryō Shimabukuro =

Okinawan karateka

Zenryo Shimabukuro (島袋 善良, Shimabukuro Zenryō; 14 November 1908 - 14 October 1969) was a karate master and the founder of Shorin-ryu Seibukan karate.

== Early life ==
Zenryo Shimabukuro was born in Shuri, Okinawa in 1908. He earned his living as a baker and tatami maker, but had studied karate under the karate master Chotoku Kyan. He began his training with Kyan in 1932, but trained with him until Kyan's death in 1945, excluding the years during World War II, when karate instruction had ceased.

== Karate career ==
Following World War II, Shimabukuro opened his own dojo, teaching karate out of his home. His students included his son Zenpo Shimabukuro and his nephew Zenji Shimabukuro, each of whom became karate masters in their own right. One of his early students was an American paratrooper named William Fuller Jr., who arranged for Shimabukuro to teach karate to some of the other American paratroopers stationed in Okinawa.

In 1960, he became president of the Okinawan branch of the Japan Karate-do Federation/All-Japan Karate-do Federation, though the branch later withdrew and became the Okinawan Karate-do United Association. In 1962, Shimabukuro founded his school, which he named Seibukan (meaning Holy Art School). In 1964 he was awarded a 10th dan red belt, which is the highest rank available within the Okinawan Karate-do United Association.

In 1967, the Okinawan Karate-do United Association became the All-Okinawan Karate-do Federation, with Shimabukuro continuing to serve as the organization's vice president.

== Death ==
On October 14, 1969, while in Osaka on his way back from the 1st All Japan Karate Championship, organized by the Zen Nihon Karate-dō Renmei and held at the Nippon Budōkan, where he performed kata Seisan, Zenryo died of appendicitis. His son Zenpo Shimabukuro became the master of the school his father had founded, Seibukan. Soon Shorin-ryu Seibukan became an internationally recognized karate style
