= Chōtoku Kyan =

Japanese karateka (1870–1945)

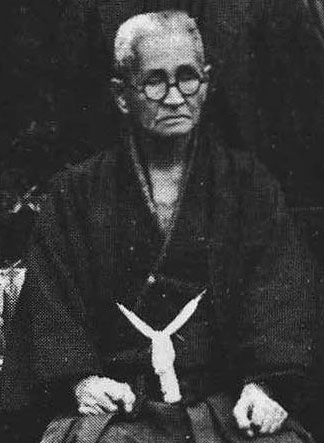
- Born: December 1870; Shuri, Ryūkyū Kingdom
- Died: 20 September 1945 (aged 74); Ishikawa, Okinawa, Japan
- Other names: Chōtoku Kiyan
- Style: Shōrin-ryū Tomari-te
- Teachers: Sokon Matsumura, Yomitan Yara, Kokan Oyadomari, Maeda Pechin, Kosaku Matsumora, Tokumine Pechin.

Other information
- Notable students: Zenryō Shimabukuro, Jōen Nakazato, Tatsuo Shimabuku, Ankichi Arakaki, Shōshin Nagamine, Tsuyoshi Chitose, Kori Hisataka

Chotoku Kyan (喜屋武 朝徳; December 1870 – 20 September 1945) (also spelled Chotoku Kiyan) was an Okinawan karate master who was famous for both his karate skills and his colorful personal life. He had a large influence on the styles of karate that would become Shorin-Ryu and its related styles.

== Early life ==
Chotoku Kyan was born the third son of Chofu Kyan, who was a steward to the Ryukyuan King before the country's 1879 annexation by Japan as Okinawa Prefecture, and originally belonged to the Kyan clan of senior court officials having home territory in Shuri Gibu village being also a genuine member of the Shuri warrior class, a concept of which was imported from Japan.

His father (born in 1839) was the eldest son of Motonaga Chōyō and a member of the 8th generation of the Motobu Udun, a clan belonging to royalty, and had been adopted into the Kyan family at the age of 17 in order to become the head of household of Chōtoku's grandmother Manabe, the third daughter of Kyan Uēkata Chōiku. He himself studied karate under Matsumura Sōkon. Chōtoku on the other hand was adopted back into the Motonaga family in order to continue the succession of his father's family.

Kyan was noted for being small in stature, suffering from asthma and frequently bed-ridden. He also had poor eyesight, which may have led to his early nickname Chan Migwa (squinty-eyed Chan).

== Karate legacy ==
Kyan's father is noted as possibly having a background in karate and even teaching Kyan tegumi in his early years.

From the age of 16 Chōtoku studied under Matsumura Sōkon for two years. Afterwards, together with his father Chōfu he moved to Tokyo where he stayed for a total of 9 years as part of the inner circle of Marquis Shō Tai, the former and last king of the Ryūkyū kingdom. According to other sources with his father he moved to Japan at the age of 12, where he stayed until he was 16.

After returning home, probably at the age of 20 he began studying Tomari-te with Kosaku Matsumora and Kokan Oyadomari from Tomari village. Due to disagreement between sources as to the chronology of his relocations it's not possible to reliably establish the age corresponding to his training under these masters.

While at 30 years of age, he was considered a master of the karate styles known as Shuri-te and Tomari-te.

The two students to have trained with Kyan the longest were Tatsuo Shimabuku and Zenryō Shimabukuro, who studied with Kyan for over 10 years each. Kyan is also noted for encouraging his students to visit brothels and to engage in alcohol consumption at various times.

Kyan was a participant in the 1936 meeting of Okinawan masters, where the term "karate" was standardized, and other far-reaching decisions were made regarding martial arts of the island at the time.

Kyan survived the Battle of Okinawa in 1945, but died from fatigue and malnutrition in September of that year.

== See also ==
- Pechin/Peichin
