= Shōrin-ryū =

Style of karate

Shōrin-ryū 少林流
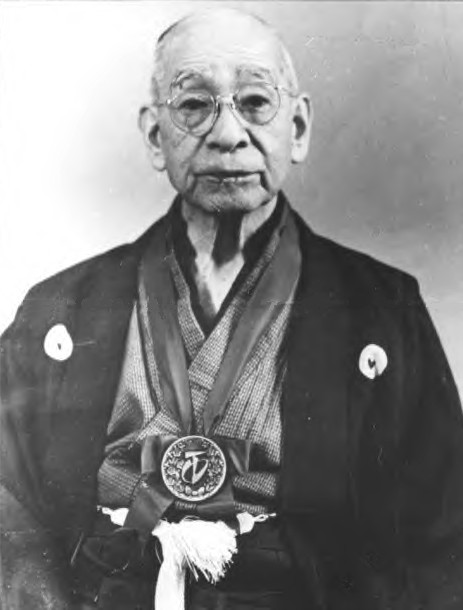
- Chōshin Chibana, founder of Kobayashi-ryū branch
- Date founded: 1929
- Country of origin: Ryūkyū Kingdom
- Founder: Chōshin Chibana
- Arts taught: Karate
- Ancestor arts: Okinawan martial arts (Shuri-te, Tomari-te)
- Descendant arts: Shotokan, Isshin-Ryu, American Kenpo
- Descendant schools: Shorin-Ryu Koshinkan; Shōrin-ryū Shidōkan; Shōrin-ryū Shōrinkan; Shōrin-ryū Kyudōkan; Shorin-Ryu Reihokan; Matsubayashi-ryū; Shōbayashi Shōrin-ryū; Jyoshinmon Shōrin-ryū; Yoshudokai Shorin-ryu; Shubukan Shōrin-ryu
- Practitioners: (see notable practitioners)

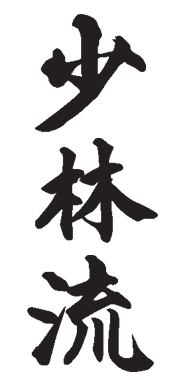
Shōrin-ryū

Shōrin-ryū (少林流) is one of the major modern Okinawan martial arts and is one of the two styles of karate as mentioned in the 'Ten Precepts' of Ankō Itosu. Shorin-ryu diverged into many styles and it became an umbrella term to encompass all of the schools derived from it.

The characters 少林, meaning "sparse" or "scanty" and "forest" respectively and pronounced "shōrin" in Japanese, are also used in the Chinese and Japanese words for Shaolin. "Ryū" means "school". Shōrin-ryū combines elements of Shaolin kung fu with the traditional Okinawan fighting style of Shuri-te.

== History ==
Chōshin Chibana was a top student of the great master of Shuri-te, Ankō Itosu. Ankō Itosu was the top student of Matsumura Sōkon, who was a renowned warrior in his time; bodyguard to three kings of Okinawa, he has been called the Miyamoto Musashi of Okinawa and was dubbed bushi, or warrior, by his king. However, while Sōkon is often referred to as the "founder" of Shuri-te, he did not invent all of its components. In 1933, Chibana chose to name his style Shōrin-ryū in honor of its samurai roots and to differentiate it from other styles that were being modified from the original teachings of Ankō Itosu. Several branches of traditional Shōrin-ryū exist today in both Okinawa and the western world. Chibana's school is also known as Kobayashi-ryū to distinguish it from other Shōrin-ryū schools. While there is a more concentrated population of practitioners in its birthplace of Okinawa, Shōrin-ryū Karate has had many high dan grades outside Okinawa.

=== Socio-political origins ===
The development of Shuri-te, the direct precursor to Shōrin-ryū, was rooted exclusively in the Okinawan noble warrior class (shizoku), specifically the palace guards, diplomats, and court officials of the Ryukyu Kingdom. Contrary to the popular cultural myth that Okinawan martial arts were invented by oppressed peasants using agricultural tools against invading samurai, historical evidence shows that these arts were highly guarded secrets practiced by elite members of the royal court. This upper class had the leisure time, wealth, and education necessary to study complex martial arts, and they frequently traveled abroad on diplomatic missions, integrating Chinese martial arts into their indigenous fighting systems.

The specific weapon arts often associated with Okinawa, known as Ryukyu Kobudo, also originated within this aristocratic class rather than among the peasantry. Law enforcement officials (pechin) and royal bodyguards utilized specialized tools like the sai (a truncheon carried by palace police) and the bo (staff) as part of their official duties to maintain peace within the kingdom. The narrative of the weaponless peasant was largely popularized in the 20th century during karate's introduction to mainland Japan to appeal to a broader public and foster a romanticized martial spirit, obscuring the art's true origins as a sophisticated system of the Ryukyuan gentry.

== Training ==
Shōrin-ryū is generally characterized by natural breathing, natural (narrow, high) stances, and circular, rather than direct movements. Shōrin-ryū practitioners assert that correct motion, moving quickly to evade violence with fluid movements and flexible positions are important, and that a solid structure is vital for powerful blocks and strikes. Stances that are too deep generally make body movement difficult. Another feature in this system is how the student is taught to punch. Generally, there is neither a horizontal nor vertical punch in Shōrin-ryū. Punches are slightly canted to the inside, with the largest knuckle of the forefinger (third from the tip) in vertical alignment with the second knuckle of the pinky finger. It is believed that this position is key in lining up the bones of the arm and creates a faster, more stable and powerful strike.

== Kata ==
Some of the key kata in Shōrin-ryū are:^{p. 30}

These are Series not truly thought of as 'kata'

- Fukyugata (Popular)
  - ichi
  - ni
  - san (in some schools)
- Kihon (Basics)
  - shodan
  - nidan
  - sandan
  - yondan
  - godan

Shōrin-ryū Core Kata

- Naihanchi
  - shodan
  - nidan
  - sandan
- Pinan
  - shodan
  - nidan
  - sandan
  - yondan
  - godan
- Passai
  - sho (Note: name changed to Itosu no Passai in Shidokan and Shinshukan.)
  - dai (Note: name changed to Matsumura no Passai in Shidokan and Shinshukan.)
- Gojushiho
- Dai Ni Gojushiho
- Chinto
- Kusanku
  - sho
  - dai
- Jion

The following Kata are not taught in all Shōrin-ryū systems or dojo

- Seisan
- Ananku
- Wankan
- Rohai
- Wanshu
- Gorin
- Koryu Passai
- Teesho
- Ryuko

The study of weapons generally only starts at dan-level, and weapon kata are not standardised across the style.^{p. 45.}

== Branches ==
- Shorin-Ryu Reihokan Naonobu Ahagon
- Shōrin-ryū Shidōkan normally called Shidōkan or Okinawan Shidōkan
- Shorinkan
- Shorinkan USA Lineage
- Shōrin-ryū Seibukan
- Matsubayashi-ryū
- Shorin Ryu Karate & Kobudo Assc (SKKA)
- Shōrin-ryū Kokau
- Shōrin-ryū Kyudōkan normally called Kyudōkan
- Shorin-Ryu Koshinkan
- Oshukai
- Chubu Shōrin-ryū
- Shōrin-ryū (Shaolin) also known as Shobayashi.
- Ryukyu Shōrin-ryū
- Kobayashi Shōrin-ryū
- Shubukan Shōrin-ryu
- Yoshudokai Shorin Ryu
- Shōgen-ryū
- Shōbayashi Shōrin-ryū

== Ranks ==
In 1924, Gichin Funakoshi, a contemporary of Chibana and also a disciple of Ankō Itosu, adopted the Dan system from judo founder Kanō Jigorō using a rank scheme with a limited set of belt colors to promote Karate-Do among the Japanese. In 1960, this practice was also adopted in Okinawa. The specific order of colors varies from organization to organization.

In a Kyū/Dan system, the beginner grade is a higher-numbered kyū (e.g., 7th Kyū) and progress is toward a lower-numbered Kyū. The Dan progression continues from 1st Dan (Shodan, or 'beginning dan') to the higher dan grades. Kyū-grade karateka are referred to as "color belt" or mudansha ("ones without dan"); Dan-grade karateka are referred to as yudansha (holders of dan rank). Yudansha typically wear a black belt.

Requirements of rank differ among styles, organizations, and schools. Kyū ranks gradually stress proper stances, balance, motion and coordination. Speed, timing, focus and power are examined at higher grades. Minimum age and time in rank are factors affecting promotion. Testing consists of demonstration of technique before a panel of examiners. Black belt testing is commonly done in a manner known as shinsa, which includes a written examination as well as demonstration of kihon, kumite, kata, and bunkai (applications of technique).

== Notable practitioners ==
- Chosin Chibana (founder)
- Kentsu Yabu
- Shoshin Nagamine
- Eihachi Ota
- Joe Lewis (martial artist)
- Mike Stone (karate)
- Bill Wallace (martial artist)
- Jim Kelly (martial artist)
- Shūgorō Nakazato
- Kazuo Hoshiyama
- John Corcoran (martial arts)
- Tiffany van Soest
- Tadashi Yamashita
- Rina Takeda
- Yukio Sakaguchi
- Leo Howard
- Katsuya Miyahira
- Higa Yuchoku
- Ankichi Arakaki
- Eizo Shimabukuro
- Ciriaco Cañete
- Robert John Burke
