= Shōrei-ryū =

Style of karate

Shōrei ryū 昭霊流
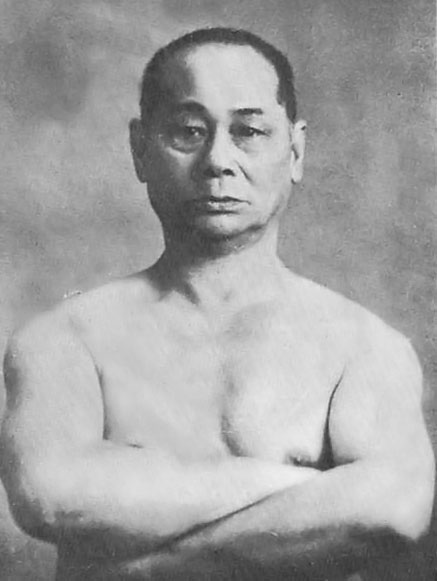
- Country of origin: Naha, Okinawa, Japan
- Founder: Higaonna Kanryō (Naha-te); Choki Motobu (modern)
- Arts taught: Karate
- Ancestor arts: Okinawan martial arts (Shuri-te), Quanfa, Baihequan
- Descendant arts: Goju-ryu, Shito-ryu, Shuri-ryu, Ryūei-ryū, Shotokan
- Practitioners: Robert Trias

Shōrei-ryū (昭霊流, Shōrei ryū) is a style of Okinawan karate and is one of the two styles of karate as mentioned in the 'Ten Precepts' of Ankō Itosu, alongside Shōrin-ryū. It was developed at the end of the 19th century by Higaonna Kanryō in Naha, Okinawa, Japan.

== Etymology ==
Shōrei-ryū means "the style of inspiration" and it is theorized that the term Shōrei derives from the Shoreiji Temple located in either Fujian or Mount Jiulian of Longnan, Jiangxi.

== Origin ==
Little is known about the origins of Shōrei-ryū, but it was influenced in its early development by Shuri-te. Kanryo Higashionna originally studied Shuri-te with Sokon Matsumura and learnt quanfa from Chinese Wai Xinxian (assistant of Xie Zhongxiang). Higaonna later traveled to China to perfect his skills, which he probably succeeded in because he learned many new kata from Fujian, the home of Baihequan (Chinese 白鶴 拳, Pinyin báihèquán) and adopted it in his style. The teachings of this temple provided the basis for the Naha-te style of Okinawan karate.

Following the passing of Higaonna Kanryo, the style began to take a new direction and became a purely "internal" combat style. This was due in large part to the influence of Choki Motobu.

Although Motobu's sensei style is still considered Naha-te, it actually had nothing to do with Higashionna. When Motobu became the leader of Shōrei-ryū, he began to guide his development in another direction, mainly because he trained with Anko Itosu of the Shuri-te style, a disciple of the great Sokon Matsumura.

== Features of style ==
The main features of Shōrei-ryū are the use of open hands, circular block techniques, and kicks to the gedan (lower-level) area.

In addition, the use of short and hard techniques in close combat in combination with throwing techniques is a specialty, especially from the sanchin and shiko-dachi stances. Great importance is also attached to training on the makiwara.

Another peculiarity is that the handling of Kobudō weapons such as bo, tonfa or sai is also very practiced.

=== Shōrei-ryū Kata ===
Shōrei-ryū originates various kata that would be used in descendant styles like Gōjū-ryū and others.

Gekisai dai ichi (撃砕大一)	Seisan (十三手)	Anan (阿南)
Gekisai dai ni (撃砕大二)	Shisōchin (四向戰)	Ohan ( )
Saifā (碎破)	Kururunfa (久留頓破)	Peiho ( )
Sanchin (三戰)	Sūpārinpei (壱百零八手)	Sōchin (壮鎮)
Tensho (転掌)	Pachu ( )	Niseishi ( )
Seienchin (制引戰)	Heiku ( )	Useishi ( )
Sansēru (三十六手)	Paiku ( )	Unsu (雲手)

== Further development ==
Modern descendants of Shōrei-ryū include styles such as Gōjū-ryū and Ryūei-ryū. Gōjū-ryū is considered the direct evolution of Shōrei-ryū.

The Shitō-ryū style also contains many elements of Shōrei-ryū, since Mabuni Kenwa was a student of Higaonna, and even the Shōtōkan style contains kata from Shōrei-ryū, which, however, did not get there directly, but were passed on to Funakoshi Gichin and his students via Mabuni Kenwa.

The Shōrei-ryū name (alternatively, Goju-Shorei-Ryu and later, Shorei-Goju Ryu) was also used for the style of karate brought to the United States by Robert Trias. Later, Trias used the name Shuri-ryu, although some lineages still use the Shorei Ryu name. This style should not be confused with traditional Shōrei-ryū. Trias's karate incorporated elements from Naha-te, Shuri-te, Tomari-te, and others.
