= Comparison of karate styles =

The table contains a comparison of the different karate styles. Some of the distinguishing features are listed, such as lineage, general form of stances, the balance of hard and soft techniques, and the number and names of kata forms.

== Background ==
The 4 major karate styles developed in Okinawa are Gōjū-ryū, Shorin-ryu, Uechi-ryu, and Wado-ryū; many other styles of Karate are derived from these four. Shorin-ryu has origins in the Shuri-Te and Tomari-Te styles from Okinawa, which were influenced by Shaolin kung fu from northern China; "Shorin" is the Japanese reading of the name "Shaolin". Gōjū-ryū has origins in Okinawan Naha-Te, which was influenced by southern Chinese martial arts. Uechi-ryu is also derived from southern Chinese styles, as its founder studied in Fujian province. Wado-ryu combines elements of Shorin-ryu with Shindō Yōshin-ryū jujitsu.

The Japan Karate Federation in mainland Japan sanctions four styles: Goju-ryu; Wado-ryu; Shotokan, a version of Shorin-ryu which emphasizes long, deep stances and powerful long range techniques; and Shito-ryu, which draws on both Shorin-ryu and Goju-ryu for its expansive syllabus.

Some later styles of karate have been derived from the four main branches with their own focuses. For example Kyokushin, which is an extremely hard style derived from Shotokan and Gōjū-ryū, involves much more breaking and full contact, knockdown sparring as a main part of training.

== Comparison of styles ==
Styles/Schools	Founded By	Founded In	Founder's Influences	Hard and soft techniques	Stances	Representative Kata	Number of kata	References
Chitō-ryū	Tsuyoshi Chitose	Kumamoto	Shōrei-ryū or Naha-te, Shōrin-ryū	both elements exist but more soft than hard	natural	Shi Ho Hai, Seisan, Ro Hai Sho, Niseishi, Bassai, Chinto, Sochin, Tenshin, Ro Hai Dai, Sanshiryu, Ryushan, Kusanku, Sanchin	15 kata not including kihon and Bo kihon/kata	
Genseiryū	Seiken Shukumine	Tokyo	Shuri-te and possibly Tomari-te.	both, but mostly soft	deep/natural	Ten-i no Kata, Chi-i no Kata, Jin-i no Kata, Sansai, (Koryu) Naifanchi, (Koryu) Bassai, (Koryu) Kusanku or Koshokun (dai)	64	
Gōjū-ryū	Chōjun Miyagi	Tsuboya, Naha (Okinawa)	Fujian White Crane and Naha-te.	both	deep/natural	Sanchin, Tensho, Gekisai Dai/Sho, Seipai, Saifa, Suparinpei	12	
Gosoku-ryu	Takayuki Kubota	Tokyo	Gōjū-ryū, Shotokan	both	deep (beginner), natural (advanced)	Gosoku, Rikyu, Denko Getsu, Tamashi	46 including weapons kata	
Isshin-ryū	Tatsuo Shimabuku	Konbu, Uruma (Okinawa)	Gōjū-ryū, Shōrin-ryū, Kobudō	both, fast & hard	natural	Seisan, Seiunchin, Naihanchi, Wansu, Chinto, Sanchin, Kusanku, Sunsu	15 including weapons kata	
Kyokushin	Mas Oyama	Tokyo	Shotokan, Gōjū-ryū	Primarily hard but soft defenses are also present	natural	Sokogi, Pinan + ura,	33	
Motobu-ryū	Motobu Chōki	Osaka	Shuri-te and Tomari-te	both	natural	Naihanchi (shodan and nidan), Shirokuma, Seisan, Passai, Ufukun, Motode (ichi and ni), Kasshindī (san, yon, go)	11	
Shindō jinen-ryū	Yasuhiro Konishi	Tokyo	primarily Shuri-te like Shitō-ryū, but also Naha-te and Tomari-te	both	deep/natural	Shimpa, Taisabaki 1-3, Sunakake no Kon	More than 60 counting all kobudo kata	
Shitō-ryū	Kenwa Mabuni	Osaka	Shuri-te and Naha-te	both	deep/natural	Pinan, Bassai Dai, Seienchin, Saifa, Rōhai, Nipaipo	94	
Shōrin-ryū (Kobayashi-ryū)	Chōshin Chibana	Torihori, Naha (Okinawa)	Shuri-te, Tomari-te, Chinese martial arts	both, primarily fast & soft	natural	Fukyu, Pinan, Naihanchi, passai, kanku, seisan	21	
Shotokan	Gichin Funakoshi	Tokyo	Shōrin-ryū and Shōrei-ryū	70% hard, 30% soft/fast	deep (formal) and natural	Taikyoku Shodan, 5 Heian, 3 Tekki, Bassai Dai and Sho, Jion, Empi, Kanku Dai and Sho, Hangetsu, Jitte, Gankaku, Sochin, Nijushiho, Chinte, Ji'in, Meikyo, Wankan, Unsu, Gojushiho Dai and Sho	27	
Shūkōkai	Chōjirō Tani	Kobe (Hyōgo)	Gōjū-ryū & Shitō-ryū	60% hard, 40% soft	natural	Pinan, Bassai Dai, Seienchin, Saifa, Rōhai	44	
Uechi-Ryū	Kanbun Uechi	Wakayama	Huzun Quan kung fu Naha-te	half-hard, half-soft	mainly natural	Sanchin, Seisan, Sanseirui	8	
Wadō-ryū	Hironori Ōtsuka	Tokyo	Shindō Yōshin-ryū Jujutsu, Tomari-te, Shotokan and Motobu-ryū	both, primarily soft	mainly natural	Primary: Pinan, Kushanku, Naihanchi, Seishan, and Chintō. Secondary: Jion, Wanshu, Jitte, Rohai, Bassai, and Niseishi	15	

== See also ==
- Boxing styles and technique
- Hybrid martial arts
- Styles of Chinese martial arts
- Styles of wrestling
- Comparison of kobudō styles
- Karate kata—includes comparison of kata performed by style

== Sources ==
- Karate-do Kyohan, written by Gichin Funakoshi, translated by Tsutomu Oshima (1935).
