= Meibukan =

Style of karate

Meibukan (明武舘) is a branch of Gōjū-ryū karate, created in Okinawa. Meibukan is managed by the IMGKA (International Meibukan Goju-Ryu Karate Association) which is currently led by Akihito Yagi Sensei who holds the title of Hanshi.

== History ==
Meibukan was created by Meitoku Yagi, a student of Goju-ryu's founder, Chojun Miyagi. The name "Meibukan" (明武館) has been said to mean "House of the pure-minded warrior."

Yagi opened the first Meibukan dojo in 1952. He was the first student of Miyagi recorded to be given permission. He was given the calligraphy "Oku myo zai ren shin" (which literally translates to Personal Excellent Comes to those who Train from the Heart, but can also mean Secrets are revealed to those with a good heart and One must first have a good heart before secret reveal itself). Yagi is the recognised Menkyo Kaiden of the Gojyu-ryu style as he was the recipient of Miyagi's gi and obi in 1953.

Meibu-kai karateka practice Gojyu-ryu kata as well as a set of kata known as the Meibu-ken kata.

== Syllabus ==
=== Kihon Kata ===
- Sanchin
- Tensho

=== Kaishu Kata ===
- Geki Sai Ichi
- Geki Sai Ni
- Saifa
- Shisochin
- Sanseryu
- Seisan
- Seienchin
- Sepai
- Kururunfa
- Suparinpe

=== Heishu Kata ===
- Sanpo Aruite Tensho

=== Meibukan Kata ===
- Tenchi
- Seiryu
- Byakko
- Shujaku
- Genbu

The kata are named after Chinese constellations: Seiryu means azure dragon, Byakko means white tiger, Shujaku means vermillion bird and Genbu means black turtle. Meitoku Yagi got the idea after seeing these names bannered on war flags during the Tsuna-Hiki (Tug of War Festival) held each year in Naha.

==== Ten Chi ====
Tenchi's name is taken from the first line in a poem in the Bubishi, "Jin shin wa Tenchi ni Onaji." This means "the mind is one with heaven and earth." Originally, Tenchi was composed of two kata, Fukyu kata ichi and Fukyu kata ni. They were eventually combined, and now Ten no kata represents the first half, while Chi no kata is the second half.

When separated, the two parts of the Kata are mirror image of one another

==== Sei Ryu (Blue Dragon) ====
The blue dragon represents the east in Chinese mythology.

The kata primarily features open-hand blocks, with offensive techniques targeting vital areas such as the eyes, groin, and knees. Characterized by rapid movements intended to evoke the speed of a dragon, Sei Ryu serves as a technical counterpart to the Byakko kata.

==== Byakko (White Tiger) ====
Byakko serves as a technical counterpart to the Sei Ryu (Blue Dragon) Kata.

White Tiger is characterized by powerful punching techniques, utilizing upward and downward movement to generate power. This is accomplished by dropping rapidly from a high stance to a low stance, and then springing back to a high stance. The power generated through this dropping and springing proves effective against those of Blue Dragon

==== Shujaku (Red Sparrow) ====
The kata is characterized by open-hand strikes, feinting, rapid hand/foot combinations, and escaping grabbing and locking attacks.

Shujaku serves as a technical counterpart to the Ganbu (Black Turtle) Kata.

=== Other Kata ===
As well, Taikyoku patterns are practiced. They can be done alone; as well as with a partner (Renzoku kumite), which is done in a straight-line pattern; or with three or five people altogether (Kakomi kumite), in which one karateka is surrounded by the others. There are no traditional Meibukan weapons forms; however, Yagi did adapt some Meibuken Kaishu kata to bō and sai, and are commonly referred to as Meibuken Kobudo. They are as follows.

- Geki Sai Ichi Bo
- Geki Sai Ni Bo
- Saifa Bo
- Geki Sai Ichi Sai
- Geki Sai Ni Sai
- Saifa Sai
- Shisochin Sai

=== Kumite ===
In Meibukan style of Goju-ryu, dojos practice forms of Yakusoku Kumite

== IMGKA and the Hombu Dojo ==
Currently, Yagi's eldest son, Meitatsu, is Chairman of the IMGKA and travels the world frequently. Presently he is the most senior active Meibukai student of Meitoku Yagi. There are branches in Australia, Canada, United States, England, India, Iran, Philippines, Russia, Georgia, Brazil, Israel and Hong Kong. Meitatsu conveys the philosophical message that some teachers of budo in the world teach how to fight, Meibukai rather teaches how not to fight. In other words, Meibukai does not practice the emphasis of how to win but rather how not to lose.

The Meibukan Hombu Dojo was founded by Meitoku Yagi in 1952 prior to the death of Gojyu-Ryu founder, Miyagi Chojun. Since then, the Meibukan Hombu Dojo has been an integral part of Okinawa Karate. Yagi was a founding father of the Okinawa Goju-kai and All Okinawa Karate-do Association both of which the Meibukan Hombu Dojo has been actively a part of since their formation. While Yagi was alive, he appointed international representatives that are still practicing Meibukan today and are still recognized by the Meibukan Hombu Dojo. These representatives are Shiki Tadanori of Ibaraki, Japan, Anthony Mirakian of USA, Yonamine Yasunori of South America, Rajesh Thakkar of India, and Cristofi Clemente of Australia. Note, however, that Johannes Wong was also a long-serving student and instructor of Gojyu-Ryu Meibukan directly under Yagi since the mid-1980s in Australia. The Meibukan Hombu dojo also has satellite branches in Okinawa, Japan that includes Matsugawa, Tsukayama, Naha, Tsuji, Kume, and Nagata.

Yagi's second son, Meitatsu, started practicing Karate in 1949 at the age of 5, and trained under his father for over 50 years. He was the president and head instructor of the Meibukan Hombu Dojo in Naha, Okinawa until 2015, and has traveled the world. He has been invited to India, Hawaii, Australia, and USA to share his knowledge of Meibukan. The Meibukan Hombu Dojo maintains an important role in keeping Yagi's legacy alive through the participation and support of the Okinawa Goju-kai and the All Okinawa Karate-do Association.

Starting from 2016, the Hombu Dojo is led by Mietatsu's son Akihito Yagi, who also serves as the chairman of the IMGKA. his second sone Akihiro Yagi serves as the vice president.

== Difference ==
There are four suffixes to "Meibu" used: kan, kai, ka, and ken. Meibukan is the "house of the pure-minded warrior." This refers the style of karate practiced. Meibukai is the association. Meibuka describes a karateka practicing Meibukan. Meibuken is, roughly translated, the "law (or fist) of the pure-minded warrior." The last one is used in association with the kata.

== Meanings of Meibukan ==
The Meibukan crest is the kanji "mei," which is the first kanji in the first names of Yagi and his two sons. Meitatsu's two sons, Akihito and Akihiro also share the kanji. The following are three interpretations of the crest.

- The kanji mei is a combination of the kanji for sun and the kanji for moon. Using them as separate kanji, you can say "hi to tsuki," which literally means "sun and moon." However, by this pronunciation, it can be interpreted as an expression meaning "one punch." The idea is that a karateka must train with the mindset that he or she may only have one opportunity to end a conflict—the karateka must train seriously and with a sharp mind.
- The kanji represent the dualities of nature. The moon is slender, flexible and always changing in the sky. The sun is thick and constant. These ideas are physically represented in the crest—the sun half of the kanji is much thicker than the moon. A karateka must be both like the sun—able to stand ground and be strong—and the moon—be adaptable and soft.
- "Ah" and "Um." Again, two dualities. Um represents defensive nature. When one inhales one must relax and be prepared. Inhaling is for conserving energy and being ready to receive an attack. Ah is the other side of the coin. Exhaling represents attacking, tension and release of breath.

There are several maxims used in Meibukan—some are particular to the style, while others are common to other styles of Gojyu-ryu and karate. The following are some of the more common sayings.

- Oku myo zai ren shin. "Practice with a good heart."
- Oku myo zai hyaku ren sen tan. "Train a hundred times, train a thousand times."
- Nangi go gokui. "The secrets of training are revealed through hard work."
- Ryu su fu sen kyo. "Running water in a stream faces no barriers."
- Kan chiku fu sho. "The pine tree bends in the wind. The bamboo is hard in the cold."

== See also ==
- https://web.archive.org/web/20171107015822/http://www.imgka.com/
- https://www.meibukanyagidojo.com/
- http://www.meibukankaratedojo.com
