= Saifa =

Kaishugata of Gōjū-ryū karate

Saifa (kanji:砕破, katakana:サイファ) is a kaishugata (kata) of Gōjū-ryū karate. According to the International Okinawan Goju-Ryu Karate-Do Federation, this kata is taught third, after Gekisai Dai Ichi and Gekisai Dai Ni, and preceding the heishugata Sanchin. It is likewise taught third in the Meibukan tradition. The name is variously translated as "rip and tear", "pound and pulverize", or "tearing and breaking ground". This name might refer to the striking techniques which prioritize closed fist strikes such as back fist or hammer fist strikes, as well as simple grabbing techniques. The origins and creator of this kata are unknown, but it has been speculated that it may have originated in Chinese styles studied by Higaonna Kanryō, who was the teacher of Miyagi Chojun, the founder of Gōjū-ryū karate. However, Tōon-ryū, the style founded by another of Higaonna's students, Kyoda Juhatsu, does not contain Saifa, leading other sources to speculate that it may have been developed by Miyagi Chojun himself. Saifa is also practiced by Shito-Ryu, founded by another of Higaonna’s students, Kenwa Mabuni, and in Kyokushin karate.
