= Higaonna =

Higaonna (written: 東恩納) is a Japanese surname. Notable people with the surname include:

- Higaonna Kanryō (東恩納 寛量, 1853–1915), founder of Gojū Ryū karate-do
- Higaonna Kanryu (1849–1922), calligrapher and martial arts practitioner
- Morio Higaonna (東恩納 盛男, born 1938), Gojū Ryū practitioner, chief instructor of IOGKF
