= Tōon-ryū =

School of karate in Japan

Tōon-ryū (東恩流)
- Date founded: 1958
- Country of origin: (Okinawa Prefecture) Okinawa
- Founder: Kyoda Juhatsu (1887–1968)
- Current head: Ikeda Shigehide
- Arts taught: Karate, Kobudō
- Ancestor arts: Goju Ryu, Naha-Te, Motobu-ryū, Shitō-ryū

Tōon-ryū (東恩流, Tō'on-ryū) is a style of Okinawan Karate founded by Kyoda Juhatsu.

Juhatsu Kyoda (許田 重発, Kyoda Jūhatsu; December 5, 1887–August 31, 1968) entered the dojo of Higaonna Kanryō in 1902 and continued studying with him until Kanryō's death in 1915. One month after Kyoda started, Miyagi Chōjun (founder of Gōjū-ryū) entered the dojo. In 1908, Kenwa Mabuni (founder of Shitō-ryū) also joined the dojo of Higaonna Kanryō.

In 1934 Kyoda received his Kyoshi license from the Dai Nippon Butoku Kai.

Apparently Kyoda knew two versions of Seisan: one from Higaonna Kanryō and one from Higaonna Kan'yu, but only passed on the Kan'yu version. He learned Jion from Kentsū Yabu and Nepai from Go Kenki. By far Higaonna Kanryō had the most profound impact on him as Kyoda devoted well over a decade of his life to learning Kanryō's karate. He ultimately named his style after him: Tō-on-ryū (literally 'Higaon[na] style').

Tōon-ryū's curriculum includes Taiso — a set of preparatory exercises that includes warming up, stretching, push ups using knuckles and feet fingers, abs etc. and Kihon — a set of basic blocking, punching, kicking and striking as well as standing and in motion.

== Katas ==
- Kihon 1: Kata made by Kanzaki Shigekazu
- Kihon 2: Kata made by Kanzaki Shigekazu
- Sanchin
- Shiho-uke/Tsuki-uke: "Receiving from four directions" or "Punching & Blocking", kata made by Kanzaki Juwa, includes basic blocking, turning, punching and kicking, hard to be mastered, a starting point to learn advanced Tōon-ryū Kata;
- Kan'yu Seisan: Kata taught to Kyoda Juhatsu by Higaonna Kanryo's older cousin, Higaonna Kan'yu (differs from other Okinawan Seisan)
- Sanseru: Kata of Kanryo Higaonna
- Kowa (Kihon 3): Kata made by Kyoda Juko and Kanzaki Juwa senseis. Name comes from the Kanji of the names of Kyoda Juko (KO) and Kanzaki Juwa (WA) senseis. Kata includes multiple kicking techniques, namely mae geri, mawashi geri, yoko geri, ushiro geri and nidan geri. A kata embusen used to prepare karateka to learn Yabu no Jion Kata
- Yabu Jion: Kata passed down by Yabu Kentsu sensei, adopted to Tōon-ryū
- P/Becchurin: Kata of Kanryo Higaonna, verbatim "100 continuous steps" and differs from Goju-ryu Suparinpei "108"
- Neipai: Kata retains Chinese flavour (possibly learned by Kyoda Juhatsu from Go Kenki but current soke doubts it because it differs a lot from Shito-Ryu's Nipai kata that was definitely learned from Go Kenki)

== Kumite ==
- Kakede: Kumite starting from pushing hands
- Bunkai: How to use a kata in a self defense situation

== Kobudo Kata weapon list ==
- Chikin Shitahaku no Sai: Kata for the weapon Sai
- Chatan Yara no Sai: Kata for the weapon Sai
- Sueyoshi no Kon: Kata as taught by Kyoda Juhatsu
- Nunchaku

== Additional exercises ==
- Rokkishu: A set of hand techniques similar to Goju-Ryu Tensho Kata and Uechi-Ryu Kanchin Kata. Opposite to the popular opinion it is not a kata;
- Ten-i-happo: A set of evasions in eight directions, made by Kyoda Juhatsu, with receiving attacks, continued by counterattacks, includes pushing an opponent of balance followed by low circular foot sweep;
- Ude Kitae: arms conditioning, preceding kumite
- Ashi Kitae: legs conditioning, preceding kumite

== Lineage ==
Kyoda's tradition was carried on by Iraha Choko (1901–1986), Kyoda Juko (3rd son; 1926–1983), Onishi Eizo (1932–), Murakami Katsumi (1927–) and Kanzaki Shigekazu/Juwa (重和) (1928–2018). Kanzaki gave teaching licenses to Yoshino Jusei (重正) (1937–2017), Fujishima Jusho (重捷), and Ikeda Jushu (重秀). Tōon-ryū have some dojo in Japan. Yoshino's branch Shidokai in Fukuoka. Onishi's branch Koeikan in Tokyo. Murakami's branch Shorinkan in Fukuoka. Ikeda Jushu is the current 4th Soke of Tōon-ryū (4th generation head of the school) still teaches karate in Beppu, Ōita.

Information about Tōon-ryū in the Western world appears mainly due to the efforts of the Karate researcher Pavel Demyanov (Russia). Pavel Demyanov studied under Ikeda Jushu (Shigehide) and learned the entire Tōon-ryū curriculum, including Kobudo, and has permission to teach.
