= Seisan =

Kata of karate

- Other names: Sesan, Seishan, Sei-Shan, Jusan, Hangetsu
- Martial art: Karate, Uechi-Ryū, Tang Soo Do
- Place of origin: Okinawa, Ryukyu Kingdom

The karate kata Seisan (十三) (alternate names Sesan, Seishan, Jusan, Hangetsu) literally means '13'. Some people refer to the kata as '13 Hands', '13 Fists', '13 Techniques', '13 Steps' or even '13 killing positions'; however, these names have no historical basis.

Seisan is thought to be one of the oldest kata, being quite spread among other Nahate schools. Shito-Ryū has its own version similar to Sanchin and different versions are now practiced even in Shuri-te derivatives like Shotokan (called Hangetsu) and in Wado-Ryū (called Seishan). Isshin-ryū also adopted this kata. Korean Tang Soo Do adopted it, and it is called either by its original name Sei-Shan or Seishan, or by Ban Wol which is the Korean translation of Hangetsu ("half moon"). Due to its difficulty, this kata is often reserved for advanced Tang Soo Do students.

== Practicing styles ==
The following styles have made this kata a formal part of their curriculum.

- Chitō-ryū
- Gōjū-ryū
- Isshin-ryū
- Isshin Kempo
- Koryu Uchinadi
- Koei-Kan
- Meibukan
- Moo Duk Kwan
- Ninjutu Shito Ryu
- Okinawa Kenpo
- Ryū-te
- Ryūei-ryū
- Seito Matsumura-ryu
- Shōrin-ryū Seibukan
- Shōrin-ryū Okinawa Seidokan
- Shōrin-ryū
- Shōrinji-ryū
- Shinki-ryu
- Shitō-ryū
- Shorinjiryu Koshinkai Karatedo
- Shotokan
- Kaminohenshi-ryu karate
- Tang Soo Do
- Uechi-ryū
- Wadō-ryū
- Shingo-ha Yoshukai Karate
- Yoshukai Karate
- Shindo-ryu Karate
- Kiaido Ryu
- JKF Renbukai
- Ronin Kempo - Jutsu

== Myth and history ==
There are numerous theories regarding the name of the kata. These include the number of steps originally in the kata, the number of different types of 'power' or 'energy' in the kata, the number of applications, or that the kata represents defense against 13 specific types of attack. None of these explanations have actual historical support. While it is believed Seisan derives from Yong Chun White Crane Boxing from Fujian Province in Southern China, where the form is known as 'Four Gate Hands', this remains completely unproven and uncorroborated. There are some other Chinese styles having a form called 'Shisan' (13) in their curricula. According to research conducted by Emanuel Giordano, the kata would derive from the Chinese form 三戰十字 San Zhan Shizi.

== Variations ==
Versions of Seisan taught today have roots in Shuri-te, Naha-te and Tomari-te streams of karate that are believed to have been traditionally taught in the Okinawan towns of Shuri, Naha and Tomari respectively.

=== Uechi-Ryū Seisan ===
This is the second of the three kata of Pangai-noon learned and then taught by Kanbun Uechi. It has obvious foundations in Sanchin, relying primarily on the "Sanchin stance" or sanchin dachi (三戦立ち) and opening as does Uechi-Ryū Sanchin for three strikes then later returning to these strikes near the end of the kata. Compared with other versions of the kata, Uechi-Ryū's is very different. The kata introduces some of the basic techniques such as knee strikes, the one-knuckle punch shōken zuki (小拳突き), spearhand nukite (貫手突き), and the front kick shōmen geri (正面蹴り) which were then incorporated in the "bridging" kata created by Kanbun Uechi's son and senior students between Sanchin and Seisan. In modern Uechi-Ryū, it is the fifth kata learned and the one tested for the first "black belt" or shodan (初段) grade.

=== Isshin-Ryū Seisan ===
Isshin-Ryū traditionally teaches this kata as the first one to be learned in their curriculum, unlike other styles. As is a feature of the style, all punches are performed with a vertical fist. The founder's primary teacher of the kata was Chotoku Kyan of the Shorin-Ryū style, but the Isshin-ryu version also shares many features with the Goju-Ryū style, including tension and breathing techniques. Meaning 13, some people refer to it as 13 hands, 13 fists, or 13 steps. Following the tradition of Chotoku Kyan, is the first kata the Isshinryu student learns. This kata is of Chinese and Shorin Ryu origin. It is one of the original kata from the ancient Pangia Noon style. Its name is derived from Master Seshan. The kata teaches the student how to fight several opponents directly in front of him and how to turn and face opponents coming from different directions. It emphasizes the "Seisan Stance" (SHO ZENKUTSU DACHI) of fighting. Bushi Matsumura developed Seisan as part of Okinawan Shuri – Te Style. He passed the kata to Chotoku Kyan, who passed it to Tatsuo Shimabuku.

=== Goju-Ryū Seisan ===
The Goju-Ryū (Naha-te) version of the kata is a more complicated version that contains close range fighting techniques such as short-range punches, low kicks, and directional changes to unbalance the opponent. It contains techniques performed under full tension through the range of motion, as well as strong fast techniques. Seisan is said to complement Seiunchin. Although rooted in the same form, significant differences can be seen in the Goju version compared to the other versions mentioned above.

=== Seibukan Shorin-Ryū Seisan ===
The version of Seisan taught in the Seibukan Shorin-Ryū syllabus can be traced back to Sōkon 'Bushi' Matsumura (a highly influential teacher to Shorin styles, hence the name Matsumura-no-Seisan). The form predominantly features the stance Shiko-Dachi (common in Tomari-te kata) accompanying a block which often sets up a powerful pivot and punch into Zenkutsu-dachi. This form introduces many recurring concepts used in higher level Seibukan Shorin-Ryu kata.

=== Okinawa Seidokan Shorin-Ryū Seisan ===
Very closely resembling the Seibukan Shorin-Ryū Seisan from the same lineage the Okinawa Seidokan system traditionally teaches Matsumura-no-Seisan as the first kata in their curriculum. Though not considered a basic kata, the Okinawa Seidokan version is foundational in teaching koshi (trunkial twist power) from a beginners onset. The use of the shiko dachi (四股立), zenkutsu dachi (前屈立), and neko-ashi dachi (猫足立) serve to build up the legs of the practitioner for low travel and centered transitioning. Traditionally the regular performance is performed to a regular counting cadence maintaining the same tempo throughout the kata. However, Okinawa Seidokan also teaches a slowed down version where every count performs breathing similar to Goju-Ryū's Sanchin kata where breathing in and out is timed upon every outward movement. This slower version is called 'Seisan Breath' and taught to higher level students to develop internal martial arts. This kata is considered a gateway kata to understanding applications of many Shorin-Ryū kata following in the system.

=== Shotokan Hangetsu ===
Hangetsu contains many slow movements under tension, popular in Naha-te schools such as Goju-Ryū, but rare in Shotokan and Shuri-te influenced styles making the kata quite unique. Funakoshi was taught by Sokon Matsumura (Shuri-te), Kodatsu Iha (a student of Kosaku Matsumora of Tomari-te) and Seisho Aragaki (associated with Goju-Ryū) all of which had knowledge of a version of Seisan. Funakoshi's could have taken the best from these contrasting styles synthesising them into Hangetsu, which possibly explains why the form is so different from other kata in the Shotokan canon.

=== Aragaki no Seisan ===

Another more obscure version of this kata known as Aragaki-no-Seisan, bears the closest surface resemblance to the Shotokan kata Hangetsu. The Shotokan version was probably renamed when Gichin Funakoshi formed his school in Japan. Hangetsu translates to 'Half Moon' or 'Half Month' a reference to the half-moon stance used extensively and the semi-circular stepping actions in this kata. The name Seisan could have been a reference to the 13-day cycle of the Moon's phases, and knowing this Funakoshi named the kata 'Half Moon/Month'. A more obscure and unlikely theory is that the kata was taken from a Chinese folk dance where the performer is explaining the importance of the tides as they cycle on 13-day intervals as the Moon revolves around the Earth.
