= Hangetsu =

Karate kata

Hangetsu (半月) (Japanese: "Half Moon") is an advanced kata practiced in Shotokan karate. It originates from the Naha-te school. The first part is executed slowly with strong breathing, stressing the development of the hara, or energy field. This sequence shares a strong similarity with Seisan. The second part of the kata is more dynamic in its execution, with an explosion of punches as well as graceful mae geri (front kicks). Due to the shared principles of expansion and contraction, Gichin Funakoshi substituted Hangetsu for Sanchin in the Shotokan curriculum. Mastery of this kata rests on mastery of hangetsu-dachi (half-moon stance) which is characterized by its semi-circular step movement of the back leg to the center, and then forward. The kata consists of 41 movements. The older Okinawan version of this kata is known as Seisan.
