= Jay Trombley =

- Born: November 2, 1938; Bellows Falls, Vermont, United States
- Died: November 23, 2022 (aged 84); North Richland Hills, Texas, United States
- Style: Gōjū-ryū Founder of Ketsugo Goju-ryu
- Teachers: Seikichi Toguchi (Goju-ryu karate), Hohan Sōken (kobudo)
- Rank: 10th Dan Founder of Ketsugo Gōjū-ryū Karate Do

Harvey Leighton Trombley (November 2, 1938 – November 23, 2022) was an American karate instructor.

== Life and career ==
Harvey "Jay" Trombley was born in Bellows Falls, Vermont in 1938. He began studying karate in Okinawa in 1955 while serving in the U.S. Marine Corps, training under Master Seikichi Toguchi at his Shoreikan Goju-Ryu dojo in Koza City. During his five years in Okinawa, he trained extensively in traditional Goju-Ryu karate, including long classes and free-style sparring, and studied traditional Okinawan kobudo under Master Hohan Soken. In 1960, he earned his black belt and teaching certificate from Toguchi. After returning to the United States, he taught karate in Jacksonville Beach, Florida, where he also studied boxing under Jackie Simpson. The boxing experience had a lasting influence on his developing martial arts system. During that same time, he learned Jiu Jitsu techniques from Bill Beach, a black belt in Jiu Jitsu. After moving to Texas in 1970, Trombley continued developing his own additions and approach to karate and, in 1974, established United Goju-Ryu, later renamed Ketsugo Goju-Ryu.

Over the following decades, Shodai Trombley developed Ketsugo Goju-Ryu into a comprehensive martial arts system combining its Shorei-kan Goju-Ryu foundation with additional kata, bunkai and kiso kumite, jiu-jitsu self-defense, judo throws and takedowns, traditional weapons, and specialized training methods. He was also deeply involved in the development of full-contact kickboxing in Texas, serving as a trainer, judge, referee, and promoter, while incorporating many of his fighters’ training methods into his karate curriculum.

Trombley operated a dojo in the Dallas/Fort Worth area for 46 years, trained thousands of students, worked with law enforcement and military personnel, and received numerous honors, including induction into Who's Who in Karate in 1982 and the Legion of Honor from Official Karate magazine in 1986.

== Retirement, Succession, and Death ==
On March 31, 2016, Trombley retired. On October 6, 2016, he formally named Robert Oliver as his successor and President of the Ketsugo Goju-Ryu Karate Association. Shodai Jay Trombley died on November 23, 2022, leaving behind a martial arts legacy carried forward through the students and instructors who continue to practice and teach Ketsugo Goju-Ryu.
