= Ryū Ryū Ko =

Chinese martial artist

Ryū Ryū Ko 劉龍公
- Born: Fujian, Qing dynasty China
- Died: Fujian, Qing dynasty China
- Style: Fujian White Crane, Whooping Crane-style
- Teacher: Unknown

Other information
- Notable students: Higaonna Kanryō, Arakaki Seishō, Norisato Nakaima

Ryū Ryū Ko (Chinese: 劉龍公 Okinawan: ルールーコウ fl. 1793 - 1882), also known as Liu Long Gong, was a Chinese martial artist who most likely practiced the Fujian White Crane style of Kung Fu. His most notable students included many of the founders of different Okinawan martial arts, which later produced Karate. These students included Higaonna Kanryō, who founded Naha-te, which became Gōjū-ryū. The kata Sanchin, taught in Gōjū-ryū and many other Naha-te-based styles of Karate, was originally taught by Ryū Ryū Ko.

Because most of what is known about Ryū Ryū Ko has been passed down by his students as an oral history, his exact identity, or even his very existence, has been disputed by critics. The research of Tokashiki Iken indicates that he also went by the name of Xie Zhongxiang (謝宗祥), a man born in Changle, Fujian. Fuzhou Wushu Association has issued a statement disputing the results of Tokashiki Iken's research regarding Ryu Ryu Ko.

Other aliases include Xia Yiyi (謝如如), in local Fujian dialect, or Xie Ruru, in modern Mandarin. The names Xie Ru Ru, Ru Ru Ko, and Ryū Ryū Ko are considered terms of endearment amongst friends since the suffix ”Ko“ (哥) means "Brother".

The research conducted by Filip Konjokrad points toward RyuRyuKo being Liu Long Gong (劉龍公), not Xie Zhongxiang.

== Life and career ==
=== Liu Long Gong ===
Liu Long Gong was a military officer and bodyguard for the Chinese Sapposhi. He was also the chief instructor at the Royal Bodyguard School during the Qing dynasty. He was originally from Beijing and later settled in Fuzhou. His house was by a river. At this time, it is not known who his instructor was. He had travelled to the Ryukyu Islands twice in an official capacity. The first time was in 1838, and the second was in 1866. His partner during both visits was Wai Xinxian. They were known as the left and right hands of the Chinese envoy, according to Seiko Higa's father. Seiko Higa recalls his father knew them as distinct individuals. This is important to note as some people have also speculated that Wai XinXian was Ryu Ryu Ko.

=== Xie Zhongxiang ===
Ryū Ryū Ko was born into the Fujian aristocratic class, who at that time were the only people permitted to study the martial arts, which he studied at the southern Shaolin Temple in the mountains of Fujian Province. Because of internal strife in China, the aristocracy was under threat, so his family was forced to conceal their identities for their own safety. This led Ryū Ryū Ko to work as a bricklayer, and later in life, he made a variety of goods such as furniture.

By some accounts, Ryū Ryū Ko was one of the first generation masters of Whooping Crane Fist (鳴鶴拳; Míng Hè Quán, ), which he either learned from his teacher Pan Yuba (who was a student of Fang Qiniang, the originator of the first White Crane martial art), or created himself, based on more general White Crane style of his teacher. He had been teaching martial arts at his home to a very small group of students, which included Higaonna Kanryō, who stayed with Ryū Ryū Ko from 1867 to 1881. Ryū Ryū Ko expanded his class to an actual public school in 1883, running it with his assistant, Wai Shinzan (Wai Xinxian).

If Ryū Ryū Ko was indeed Xie Zhongxiang, then it is also possible that he had a son named Xie Tsuxiang. If Ryū Ryū Ko and Xie Zhongxiang were the same person, then his currently living direct descendant is his great-grandson, Xie Wenliang. Historical records provided by the Fuzhou Wushu Association show that Xie Zhong Xiang was not of aristocratic birth and never had to hide his identity. Xie Zhong Xiang worked as an apprentice shoe-maker in Fuzhou until he was 30 when he started his own martial art school, whereas accounts in the Okinawan Ryū Ryū Ko oral tradition stated that he worked as a brick-layer and basket-weaver in his later years.

Karate historians from the Gōjū-ryū lineage have cited the visit by Miyagi Chojun to Fuzhou to seek Ryū Ryū Ko after Miyagi's teacher, Kanryo Higaonna died in October 1915. Miyagi Chojun travelled to Fuzhou in May 1915 and again in 1916, with Eisho Nakamoto (in 1915) and Gokenki (呉賢貴, in 1916). There he was met by Ryu Ryu Ko's students, presumably some who knew Higaonna Kanryo. Based on the oral tradition passed on by Miyagi Chojun, he was brought before Ryu Ryu Ko's grave to pay his respects. Unless Miyagi Chojun's oral history is to be disregarded, then Ryū Ryū Ko, who died before 1916 and Xie Zhongxiang who died in 1930 were not the same person.

Since the name "Ryū Ryū Ko" really existed in Okinawan tradition through the references provided by his students, any research into the identity of Ryū Ryū Ko should be based on these references. Norisato Nakaima (1819－1879 the founder of Ryūei-ryū, based the first character in the name of his style on Ryū Ryū Ko's surname. The character Norisato Nakaima used was "劉" which in Fuzhou dialect sounded like Liu/Ryu. Historians cite this as another piece of evidence to suggest that Xie Zhong Xiang was not Ryū Ryū Ko. (Note that prior to 1948 the vast majority of the population in Fujian Province spoke Fujian and not Mandarin, and Xie Zhongxiang's alias Xie Ruru as pronounced today would have been pronounced Xia Yiyi in late 19th Century Fujian.) According to the Ryuei Ryu Tradition, Norisato Nakaima began studying under Ryū Ryū Ko when he was 19 years old, circa 1838 to 1839 and spent 7 years learning martial arts as well as knowledge in Chinese herbal medicine from Ryū Ryū Ko.

Those who dispute the claims that Xie Zhong Xiang was Ryū Ryū Ko cite the fact that Xie Zhongxiang's nickname would have been pronounced "YiYi Go" in Fujianese Dialect, and not "Ru Ru Ko", the later being a modern Mandarin pronunciation of his nickname. Taking into consideration the formality involved in a teacher's acceptance of a student into his martial arts school in those days, as it was apparent in the manner in which Kanryo Higaonna chose his own students in later years, it was deemed unlikely that Ryū Ryū Ko's students would have referred to him by any title other than his formal name. Historical records from Fuzhou Martial Arts Association show that Xie Zhong Xiang was referred to either by his full-name or known as Yi-Shi ( 如师) which means Yi-Sensei in Fujianese dialect. Those who dispute claims that Xie Zhong Xiang is Ru Ru Ko say that it is highly unlikely for Okinawan students to refer to their teacher of martial arts by his nickname "Brother Yiyi", and Ryū Ryū Ko's student Norisato Nakaima's claim that his Sensei's surname was "Ryu" (劉) is more plausible.

=== Ryū Ryū Ko's students ===
The Okinawan martial artists who are believed to have studied in Ryū Ryū Ko's school were Higaonna Kanryō (founder of Naha-te), Arakaki Seishō, Norisato Nakaima (1819－1879) (founder of Ryūei-ryū), Sakiyama Kitoku (1830–1914), Kojo Taitei (1837–1915), Maezato Ranpo (1838–1904), Matsuda Tokusaburo (1877–1931).
