= Meitoku Yagi =

Okinawan karateka

Meitoku Yagi (八木明徳 Yagi Meitoku, born March 6, 1912, in Naha, Okinawa - died February 7, 2003) was a karate master and teacher. He learned Goju-ryu from its legendary founder Chojun Miyagi. On April 29, 1986, Emperor Hirohito named Yagi a Living National Treasure (ningen kokuho) for his contributions to the martial arts.

== Training ==
Yagi began training under Miyagi in 1927, when he was 14 years old. Miyagi was impressed by his dedication and hard work, and eventually taught him all the kata in the Goju-ryu syllabus. Normally, Miyagi would only teach Sanchin to his pupils for several years, and even then he might only teach them Seisan and Seiunchin. To complement his karate training, Yagi enjoyed many activities including shodo, playing the piano and shamisen, and chinese chess.

At the age of 20, in 1933, he was given the 8th degree rank Kyoshi, the highest at that time by the Dai Nippon Butoku Kai. Under Chojun Miyagi there was no ranking.

== Career ==
In 1952, A year before Miyagi's death (October 8, 1953), Yagi opened his own dojo in the Daido district of Naha. He named his school of Goju-ryu Meibukan, meaning "house of the pure minded warrior." The name and crest of his school both utilize the first kanji in his given name, 明 (Mei), which has several meanings, including purity. It is made up of the kanji for sun and the kanji for moon, reflecting the duality of nature, which is inherent to Goju-ryu. Today, the main headquarters for the Meibukan school are in the Kume district of Naha. Yagi's number one goal was for his students to promote peace, be good people and contribute to society.

Meitoku Yagi began developing a series of kata in the 1970s and 1980s, which he named Meibuken kata. The first of which is Tenchi, meaning "heaven and earth." It was originally two kata, Fukyu Kata Ichi and Fukyu Kata Ni. The two kata can be put together so that if two karateka were to perform each half an attack in the first kata would correspond with a block in the second, for example. The Meibuken kata are different from the kata in the Goju-ryu syllabus in many ways, including having vertical closed hand chambers, and having a different yoi position, reflecting Yagi's Chinese roots, and his time spent studying martial arts there.

The other four Meibuken kata represent the four guardians of the cardinal directions in Chinese mythology. As with Ten no Kata and Chi no Kata, the other four pair up as well to show the kata’s bunkai. Seiryu (East, Blue Dragon) and Byakko (West, White Tiger) go together, and Suzaku (South, Red Phoenix) and Genbu (North, Black Tortoise) combine. Though those are the English names generally used for the kata, Yagi once said that he never specifically chose colors for the animals.

In 2000, Yagi released an autobiography entitled The Life Drama of the Man, Meitoku.

In late 2002, he was 91 and still performing demonstrations of katas. He died February 7, 2003, at 11:40 am. At the time of his death he was considered as the most senior karateka in the world.

== Family ==
Meitoku Yagi had three daughters, Chieko, Chikako and Chizuko; and two sons, Meitatsu and Meitetsu. Meitatsu Yagi was made the president of the International Meibukan Goju-ryu Karate Association (IMGKA), and the president of the Meibukan hombu dojo until 2016. In 1997, Meitoku promoted his eldest son, Meitatsu to Hanshi Judan. Before his death, Meitoku also promoted Meitetsu to Hanshi Judan in 2001, but it was only made known publicly posthumously.
