= Sekō Higa =

Okinawan karateka

Sekō Higa 比嘉 世幸
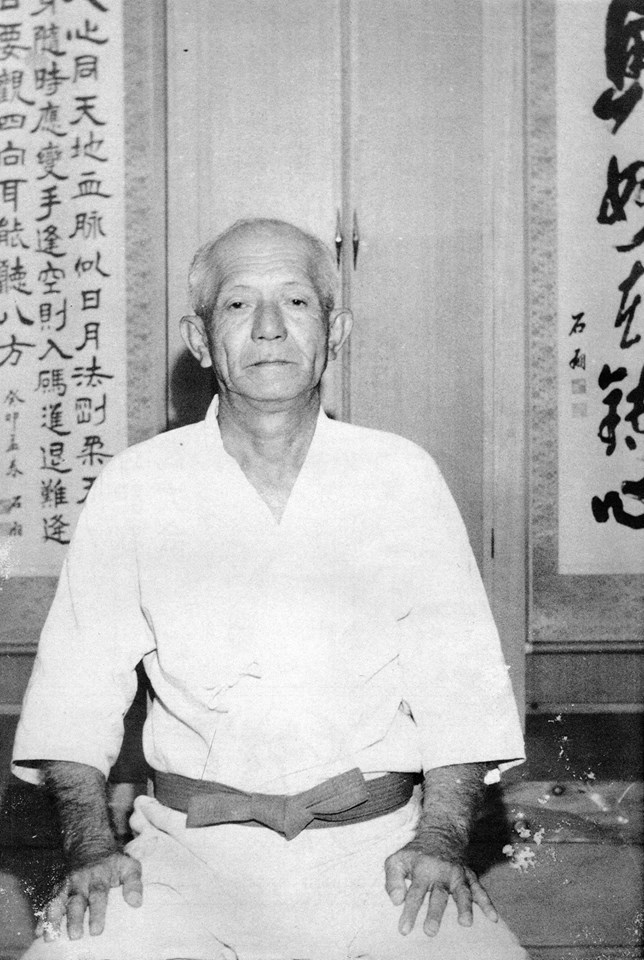
- Born: 8 November 1898; Naha, Okinawa Prefecture, Ryūkyū Kingdom
- Died: 16 April 1966 (aged 67)
- Style: Goju Ryu
- Teachers: Higaonna Kanryo, Chōjun Miyagi
- Rank: Hanshi

Other information
- Notable students: Seikichi Higa (son), Choboku Takamine, Juei Tamaki (kobudo), Seitoku Matayoshi, Choyu Kiyuna, Toguchi Seikichi, Zenshu Toyama, Eiki Kurashita, Kanki Izumigawa, Tetsuhiro Hokama, Kimo Wall

Sekō (Seiko) Higa (比嘉 世幸, Higa Sekō; 8 November 1898 – 16 April 1966) was a Gojū Ryū karate teacher who was born in Naha.

== Early life ==
At age 13, Higa began to study under Higaonna Kanryō until Higaonna's death 4 years later. Higaonna had three students at the time: Juhatsu Kyoda (1887–1968), Chojun Miyagi (1888–1953), and Seko Higa (1898–1966). Kyoda went on to create his style, To'on Ryu, and Miyagi assumed the mantle of Higaonna's legacy. Higa, a policeman at the time, continued his studies with Miyagi Chōjun for 38 years until Miyagi's death.

== Teaching career ==
In 1931, Higa retired from the police force and opened his dojo in the Kumoji section of Naha. Only four students of Miyagi's were allowed to open a dojo while the master was still alive: Seko Higa, Jin'an Shinzato, Jinsei Kamiya, and Meitoku Yagi. In 1935, Higa went to the island of Saipan to teach Goju-ryu at the request of a friend. The move was not successful and Higa returned to Okinawa two years later.

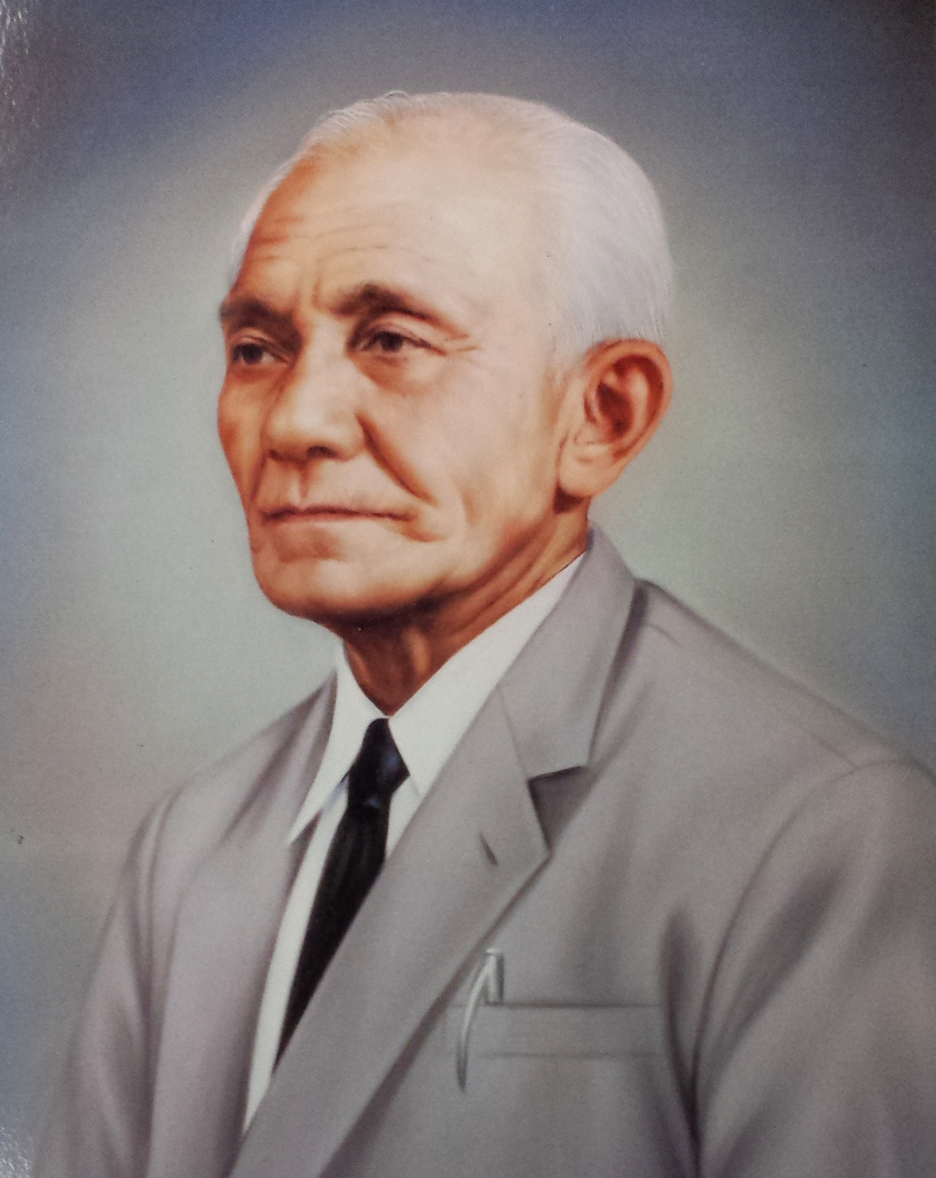
Portrait of Seko Higa, Shodokan Goju-Ryu.

Among Higa's students were Choboku Takamine, his son Seikichi Higa (who carried on his father's dojo in Okinawa), Kanki Izumigawa who spread Goju-Ryu in mainland Japan Kawasaki area, Seiichi Akamine (creator of the Ken-Shin-Kan, spread Karate-do in South America). Seikichi Toguchi (creator of the Shoreikan), Zenshu Toyama (creator of the Shinjikan), Choyu Kiyuna, Seitoku Matayoshi, Seiko Fukuchi (1919–1975), Eiki Kurashita, Zensei Gushiken, Izumi, Hokama Tetsuhiro and others that carried on the Goju-ryu Kokusai Karate Kobudo Renmei.

=== Goju-ryu International Karate Kobudo Federation ===
The Goju-ryu Kokusai Karate Kobudo Renmei ("Goju-ryu International Karate Kobudo Federation") is a tightly knit organization founded by Seko Higa and run with corporate efficiency with a president, vice-president, and secretary. Its first president was Seiko Higa himself, who ran it from 1960 to 1966. The next president was Uemon Tetsuo, who ran it from 1966 to 1967; the third generation was Takamine Choboku, who held office from 1967 to 1989. Higa's son, Sekichi, was president in 1990. The fifth-generation president was Eiki Kurashita until 2007. Zensei Gushiken took office in 2008. He held his office till 2019 when Akira Gushi was appointed to be the current president of the Renmei. True to its name and to the founder's vision, Higa's Federation is international in scope: it has branch dojos in Japan, Hong Kong, France, Slovakia, Czech Republic, Russia and North America. In recent years branch directors (Shibucho) were appointed in Canada (Yaro Tarana), Czech Republic (Mirek Brokes) and Slovakia (Erik Stefak, Daniel Baran).
