= Arakaki Seishō =

Okinawan martial artist

Seishō Arakaki 新垣 世璋
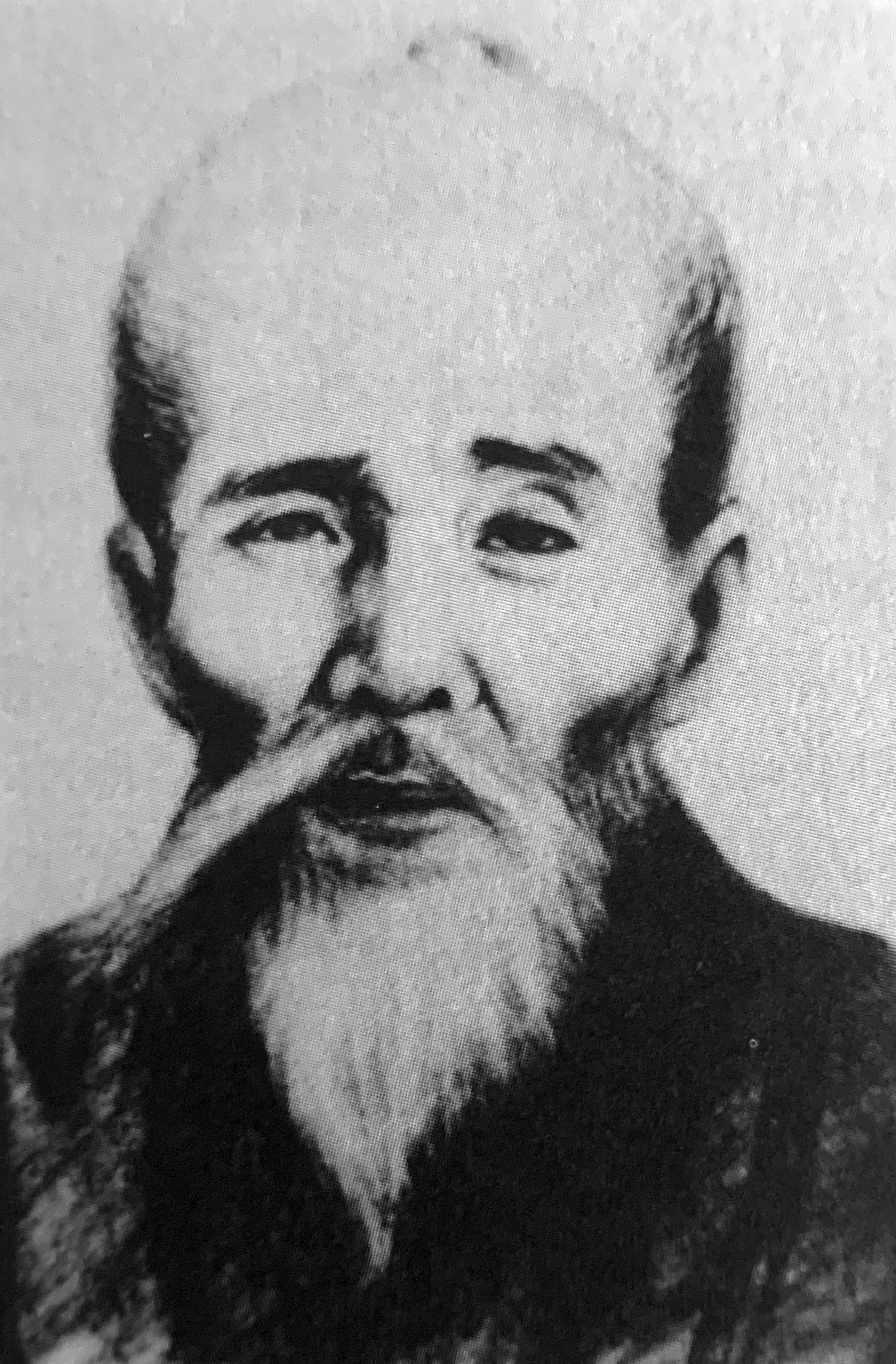
- Historical drawn portrait of Arakaki Seishō
- Born: 1840; Okinawa, Ryūkyū Kingdom
- Died: 1918 (aged 77–78); Naha, Okinawa, Japan
- Other names: Arakaki Ou, Mayā Arakaki, Arakaki Kamadeunchu, Aragaki Tsuji Pechin Seisho
- Style: Tōde
- Teacher: Wai Xinxian

Other information
- Notable students: Tsuyoshi Chitose, Funakoshi Gichin, Higaonna Kanryō, Uechi Kanbun, Kanken Tōyama, Mabuni Kenwa

Arakaki Seishō (新垣 世璋; 1840–1918) was a prominent Okinawan martial artist and master of Tōde who influenced the development of several major karate styles. He was known by many other names, including Aragaki Tsuji Pechin Seisho.

== Life and martial arts ==
Arakaki was born in 1840 in either Kumemura, on Okinawa Island, or on the nearby island of Sesoko. He was an official in the royal court of Ryūkyū, and as such held the title of Chikudon Peichin, which denoted a status similar to that of the samurai in Japan. On 24 March 1867, he demonstrated Okinawan martial arts in Shuri, then capital of the Ryūkyū Kingdom, before a visiting Chinese ambassador; this was a notable event, since experts such as Ankō Asato, Ankō Itosu, and Matsumura Sōkon were still active at that time. Arakaki served as a Chinese language interpreter, and travelled to Beijing in September 1870. His only recorded martial arts instructor from this period was Wai Xinxian from Fuzhou, a city in the Fujian province of Qing dynasty China. Arakaki died in 1918.

== Kata ==
Arakaki was famous for teaching the kata (patterns) Unshu, Seisan, Shihohai, Sōchin, Niseishi, Shisōchin and Sanchin (which were later incorporated into different styles of karate), and weapons kata Arakaki-no-kun, Arakaki-no-sai, and Sesoku-no-kun.

== Legacy ==
While Arakaki did not develop any specific styles himself, his techniques and kata are obvious throughout a number of modern karate and kobudo styles. His students included Higaonna Kanryō, founder of Naha-te; Chōjun Miyagi (宮城 長順), founder of Gōjū-ryū; Funakoshi Gichin, founder of Shotokan; Uechi Kanbun, founder of Uechi-ryū; Kanken Tōyama, founder of Shūdōkan; Mabuni Kenwa, founder of Shitō-ryū; and Chitose Tsuyoshi, founder of Chitō-ryū.

Some consider Chitō-ryū the closest existing style to Arakaki's martial arts, while others have noted that Arakaki's descendants are mostly involved with Gōjū-ryū.
