= Nijūshiho =

Karate technique

- Other names: Niseishi, E Sip Sa Bo
- Martial art: Karate, Tang Soo Do
- Place of origin: Okinawa, Ryukyu Kingdom
- Creator: Unknown
- Date of creation: Unknown

Nijūshiho or Niseishi, Nandan sho (二十四歩) (Japanese: Twenty-Four Steps) is an advanced kata practiced in Shotokan, Shitō-ryū, Chito-ryu, Ryūei-ryū, Shuri-ryū and Wadō-ryū karate.

The origin of Nijūshiho is unknown, but it is presumed that it originates from the Aragaki group like Sochin and others. This is shown through the similarity to Unsu. In introducing karate from Okinawa to Japan, Gichin Funakoshi changed the name of the kata from Niseishi to Nijūshiho. Both names mean "Twenty-Four Steps."

This kata is also practiced in Tang Soo Do and is called E Sip Sa Bo in Korean. Due to its difficulty, this kata is often reserved for advanced black belt level students. Like its Japanese and Okinawan counterparts, E Sip Sa Bo also translates to “Twenty-Four Steps.”

In Shuri-ryu this kata is taught to students achieving the rank of shodan.

== See also ==
- Bunkai
- Kata
- Shotokan
