= Meitatsu Yagi =

Okinawan karateka

Meitatsu Yagi (八木明達 Yagi Meitatsu, born July 7, 1944) is the eldest son of Meitoku Yagi and followed after him as a teacher and practitioner of Karate.

Meitatsu was tutored as early as the age of 5 directly by his father, grand master Meitoku Yagi, and earned his Shodan rank in 1960, at the age of 16.

By training under his father for over fifty years, he was groomed and trained to carry on the legacy of Meibukan Goju-Ryu (hard-soft style) Karate. One of Yagi’s goals has been to spread Meibukan Goju-Ryu Karate throughout the world. Yagi has lived, worked, initiated new dojos and taught Meibukan in several places outside of Okinawa and around the world. Yagi lived in the US from 1964 to 1970; in Guam 1971 to 1975; in Saipan 1995 to 1997 and in the Philippines 1997 to 1998. After returning from Guam in 1975, Yagi was given the title of Renshi 6th Dan and became a Director of All Okinawan Karate-Do Association in 1976. Also in 1976, he was given the teaching responsibilities at the Hombu Dojo in Okinawa as President of Goju-Ryu Meibu-kai with Meitetsu Yagi (his younger brother) as Vice-President and Meitoku Yagi as Chairman / Consultant.

In 1980 he wrote his first book Karate Flies Around the World.

Meitoku Yagi chose his eldest son Meitatsu to be the first to learn all facets of Meibukan Goju-Ryu. He helped develop and teach all the kata, Renzoku Kumite, Kakomi Kumite, Meibukan Bo, Meibukan Sai, Nihon Kumite, Renzoku form and Kakomi forms. Although many profess to be Meibukan practitioners, many have not learned or practiced the forms developed by him for his style. These forms are an integral part of Meibukan Goju-Ryu.

Meitatsu was a director of the All Okinawa Karate-Do Gojyu-Kai for 20 years. He also served a two-year term as President of the Okinawan Karate-Do Goju-Kai in 1987 as well as President of the Hombu Dojo in Kume.

In 1995 Meitatsu worked in Saipan and the Philippines, returning in 1998 to help care for his father who was ailing at the time. Meitoku Yagi gave Meitatsu Yagi the title of Hanshi Judan, Okinawa Karate-Do Goju-Kai in 1997. Meitatsu Yagi travels the world meeting and teaching hundreds of people each year in seminars in India, Canada, Israel, Italy, the USA, England and France as well as South America.

Meitatsu has also been very active in promoting the Okinawa Traditional Karatedo Kobudo International Studying Center in Yomitan Village, Okinawa. He is working with Kenyu CHINEN of Shorin-Ryu and Yasuo SHIMOJI of Uechi Ryu. All three masters are traditional Okinawan teachers and are working together to promote Okinawa Traditional Karate-Do and Kobudo in Okinawa and around the world.

In 2007, he published his second book on the history and philosophy of Meibukan gojyu-ryu, entitled, "Importance of Spiritual Karate".

Meitatsu was the president of the International Meibukan Goju-ryu Karate Association (IMGKA). until December 2015, when his son Akihito Yagi became the new president.

== Family life ==
Meitatsu Yagi is married and has two children - Akihito Yagi and Akihiro Yagi, both were trained by Meitatsu Yagi and currently lead the IMGKA association

He lives in Naha, Okinawa
