= Seikichi =

- Gender: Male

Origin
- Origin: Japanese
- Meaning: Different meanings depending on the kanji used

Seikichi (written: 清吉 or 政吉) is a masculine Japanese given name. Notable people with the name include:

- Seikichi Odo (1926–2002), Japanese karateka
- Seikichi Toguchi (渡口 政吉) (1917–1998), Japanese karateka

Fictional characters:

- Seikichi Tamaya (玉屋 清吉) character in the stage play and anime series Oh! Edo Rocket
- Seikichi Tamaya is an antagonist in Hidamari no Ki
