= Higaonna Kanryu =

Okinawan karateka

- Born: 1849; Ryukyu Kingdom
- Died: 1922 (aged 72–73); Naha, Okinawa
- Teacher: Wai Shinzan

Other information
- Notable students: Kyoda Juhatsu

Higaonna Kanryu (1849-1922) was a Ryukyuan karateka well known for his calligraphy and Chinese studies as well as his martial arts. He learned his martial arts under Wai Shinzan and not under Ru Ru Ko as some believe. His relative Higaonna Kanryō studied under both these Chinese kung fu masters.

Because of the similarity of their names, Higaonna Kanryu ("East Higaonna") and Higaonna Kanryō ("West Higaonna") are frequently confused with each other.
