= Hangetsu dachi =

Hangetsu dachi (半月立)

Hangetsu dachi (半月立) is a karate middle weight stance. It is a version of sanchin used in some karate styles, particularly Shotokan. This stance is longer than sanchin-dachi, but retains the same tension and inward rotation of the knees. It is the basis of the kata Hangetsu.

== See also ==
- Karate stances
