= Seiunchin =

Kata of Goju-ryu karate

Seiunchin (制引戦 (セイユンチン)), also pronounced as Seienchin (セイエンチン) and the latter often written as 征遠鎮, is a kaishu karate kata. In the lineage of Goju-ryu, it taught by that style's founder, Chojun Miyagi, who in turn learned it from his teacher, Kanryo Higaonna. Seiunchin can be interpreted to mean "pulling".

Meibukan karateka believe that this kata originated in xingyiquan and that Seiunchin's direct translation has been lost. Meibukan karateka refer to it as "Marching far Quietly".

Seiunchin is distinct in that no kicking techniques are used, as with Tensho and Sanchin. Seiunchin uses shiko dachi and incorporates strikes such as the back fist and elbow.

Seiunchin was brought to Isshinryu, another Okinawan style, by Tatsuo Shimabuku: he learned it from Chojun Miyagi while studying Goju-ryu.

== Isshin - Ryu ==
The word "Seiunchin" is written as "Control Pull, Fight" by many Okinawa Gojuryu stylists, as well as isshinryu teacher Master Angi Uezu (son in law of Shimabuku Tatsuo). perhaps hinting at the various grappling and grabbing techniques contained within Seiunchin translates as the "War Kata," "Lull Before The Storm," or "Calm Within the Storm". Seiunchin Kata contains no kicking techniques but builds strength and stamina through its breathing and strong muscular tension. This kata teaches a horse stance (as if riding a horse) position. This kata is of Goju Ryu origin. Seiunchin traces back to Kanryo Higaonna of the Naha-te system (1853-1915). Higaonna traveled to China and studied Chinese Kempo. One of Higaonna's most famous students was Chojun Miyagi (1887-1953) Miyagi also traveled to China and spent four years studying Chinese martial arts. In 1920, Miyagi founded the karate system Goju-Ryu. It is unknown if Seiunchin was developed by Kanryo Higaonna or Chojun Miyagi, but Seiunchin has roots in the Chinese systems.
