= Shisochin =

Style of karate

Shisochin (四向戦) is a kata of naha-te karate style, whose authorship has been mentioned as Kanryo Higaonna.

There are two theories that explain the origins of kata shisochin: the first suggests that the shape or style comes from white heron or the Tiger, Shaolin kung fu, the other it is from mantis style.

It is said that the kata was introduced in Okinawa through the master Higaonna, when he returned from his trip he made to Fuchi, in Fujian province, where he learned the exercise from the master Ryu Ryu Ko, although some of circumstances did not corroborate the version, it seems that there was already a version of the kata, taught by master Seisho Aragaki.

Shisochin begins at the stance Sanchin dashi in three kyodo when applying three successive nukite zuki. There is a predominance of kaisho waza (open hand) techniques. The posture is eclectic, with high and low stances, highlighting the feature of adaptability. Besides Sanchin dashi, are well marked and ayumi dashi and zenkutsu dashi.

The kata is symmetrical. And, alternating atemi waza, there are also projection techniques - nage waza - and grasping.
