= Fang Qiniang =

Chinese martial artist

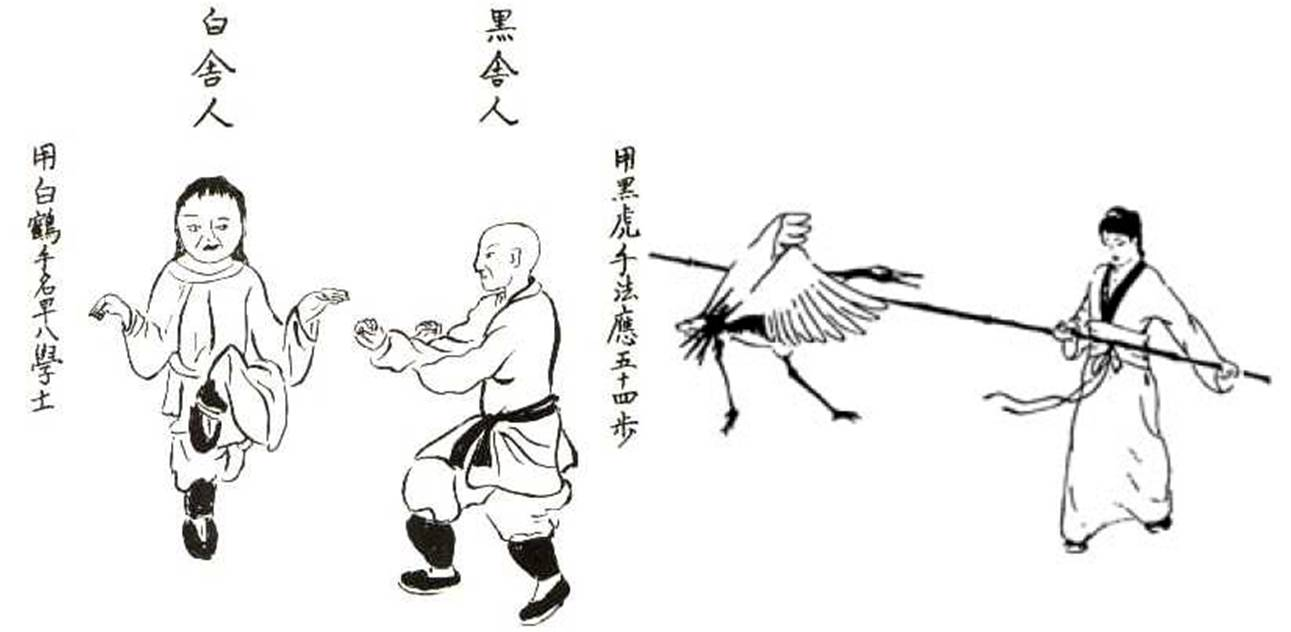
- Fang Qiniang teaching- Fighting with the crane
- Born: Ming dynasty Lishui, Zhejiang, China
- Native name: 方七娘
- Other names: Amoy Min Nan; Hng Chhit-niâ; Fang Chi
- Style: Fujian White Crane

Fang Qiniang (Chinese: 方七娘 Fāng Qīniáng) - alias Fong Chut-leung and Fong Wing-chun - was a Chinese martial artist and founder of the Fujian White Crane style of Chinese martial arts in the mid-17th century. She learned martial arts from her father, Fang Zhengdong, a lay Shaolin disciple.

Martial arts scholars and academics have noted a similarity between Fang Qiniang's story and that of Yim Wing-chun, the female figure credited as creator of Wing Chun, as espoused by the Ip Man lineage. It is agreed that Fang and Fujian White Crane Kung Fu came to existence before Wing Chun and its legend.

== Legend ==
According to the legend, Fang Qiniang was born in Lishui, Zhejiang, China, during the Ming dynasty. Her father was Fang Zhengdong and her mother Lee Pikliung. Her father trained Shaolin luohan quan at the 9 Lot Mountain Temple in the Ching Chiang district in Fujian Province; this temple was one of the Shaolin enclaves of Fujian and the Ming revolutionaries. During that time, the Qianlong Emperor ordered the destruction of Southern Shaolin Temple and the death of all Ming revolutionaries. Fang Zhengdong was one of the lucky few to escape alive. He initially fled with his family to Pik Chui Liang to finally settle near the Ching Chu temple on the Ching Chea mountain in Yongchun village.

Her father died during a fight with a neighbor and she vowed to avenge him. One day, while she was trying to improve her fighting skills, she saw two cranes fighting. She observed them and tried to scare them off with a stick. She wasn't able to and meditating on it later, she decided that she had to learn from the cranes, and developed her own unique techniques from the experience. After three years of training she became a skilled and unusual fighter and started to gain disciples and challengers. One of her challengers was Zeng Cinshu.
