= Tomari, Okinawa =

Neighborhood of Naha, Okinawa Prefecture

Coordinates: 26.223446°N 127.686968°E

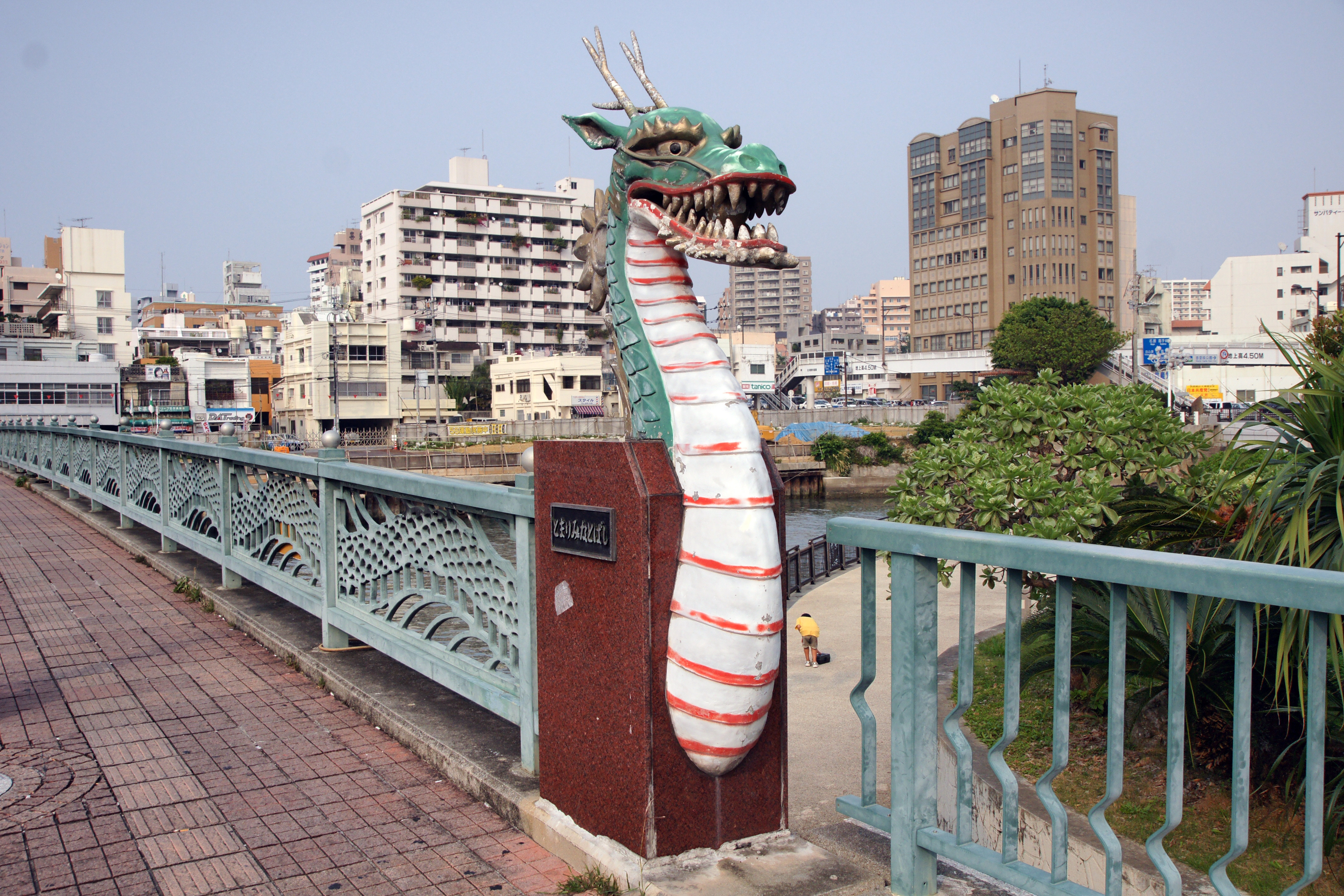
Tomari Wharf of Naha Port

Tomari (Japanese: 泊; Okinawan: Tumai) is a neighborhood of Naha, Okinawa Prefecture, Japan, where the Tomari Terminal of the port of Naha is located. The terminal is used for ferries and passenger vessels which connect Naha and neighboring islands.

Before the modern city of Naha was established, Tomari was a magiri, a type of municipality. Tomari served as the primary port for Ryukyuan ships travelling within the Ryūkyū Islands to dock and to engage in loading and unloading of their cargo. Tribute received from Amami Ōshima was handled by the local officials at Tomari.

Tomari-te, a style of karate, originated in Tomari. Kyan Chōtoku and Chōki Motobu practiced this style of Okinawan karate.
