= Sōchin =

Karate kata

Sōchin (壯鎭) (Japanese: "Tranquil Force", or "Preserve the Peace") is a kata practiced in several styles of karate. It may have derived from Dragon style kung fu, and was taught in the Naha-te school in Okinawa by Seisho Arakaki. It was then passed down to Shitō-ryū. Later, a variation of it was introduced into the Shotokan style by Gichin Funakoshi's son, Yoshitaka. Some branches of Tang Soo Do have added it to their curriculum under the name "Sojin".

The rhythm of the kata is dynamic, characterized by slow, deliberate movements interspersed with explosive bursts of speed. In the Shotokan version of the kata, the dominant stance is sōchin-dachi a.k.a. fudo-dachi (rooted stance). In the Shitō-ryū version, it employs several stances including nekoashi-dachi (cat stance) and zenkutsu dachi (front stance). Rhythm is important in its execution. This kata has been said to develop chi/ki energy.

Sōchin is practiced in Shuri Style Karate, not from Naha Style.
