= Seikichi Toguchi =

Okinawan karateka

Seikichi Toguchi (渡口 政吉, Toguchi Seikichi; May 20, 1917 in Naha City, Okinawa, Japan – August 31, 1998 in Tokyo) was the founder of Shorei-kan karate.

== Biography ==
As a young boy, Toguchi learned the basic techniques of Okinawan Te from his father. In 1930, at the age of 15, he began his lifelong study of Gōjū-ryū karate at the dojo of Sekō Higa and later under Chojun Miyagi as one of his principal students. He studied under Higa for over 33 years and under Miyagi for more than 25 years, making his karate education unique. Toguchi was fortunate as Miyagi was a personal friend of Toguchi's father and so paid many visits to the family. At these times the conversation nearly always turned to karate and the discussions would go on until the early hours of the morning.

Toguchi continued his full-time study of karate until the beginning of World War II, when he was drafted into the army as an electrical engineer and stationed in Sumatra, Indonesia. In 1946, he returned to Okinawa to find a devastated people and homeland. Miyagi had lost three children and one of his senior students, Jinan Shinsato. Higa had lost his wife. Miyagi began teaching at the police academy, and Higa moved in with Toguchi. At this time Higa also played matchmaker and introduced Toguchi to a young woman named Haruko, who would soon become his wife.

In 1949, with Toguchi's help, Higa opened a new dojo, and Toguchi was appointed Shihan. Before his death, Miyagi passed on all of his advanced kata and teachings to Toguchi, one of the most important being kaisai no genri. This teaching explains how to unlock the hidden techniques within the koryu kata. In 1953, following Miyagi’s death, his senior students formed the Karate-Do Goju Association, with Meitoku Yagi as chairman and Seikichi Toguchi as vice chairman.

== Establishment of Shorei-kan ==
In 1954, Toguchi opened the first Shorei-kan dojo (House of Politeness and Respect) in Koza City, Okinawa. The Shorei-kan dojo was very close to the American military bases, including Kadena Air Base and Camp Hauge, and the Americans showed great interest in the martial arts. As the number of Western students in his dojo increased, Toguchi found it necessary to devise a progressive teaching method to overcome the language barrier. Expanding on Miyagi’s vision, Toguchi further developed a system of progressive kata and added bunkai and kiso kumite to help explain the applications of the kata. Many early pioneers of Okinawan karate in the United States studied with Toguchi.

In 1956, the Okinawan Karate-Do Federation was formed, and Toguchi was appointed to its board of directors. By 1960, Toguchi had decided to move to mainland Japan to spread the art of karate and Shorei-kan. During the following years, he traveled between Okinawa in the winter and Tokyo in the summer. He initially practiced outdoors at the Hikawa Shrine, where he developed the kata Hakutsuru no Mai. In 1962, the first Shorei-kan dojo was opened in Tokyo’s Meguro Borough, and in 1966, the Shorei-kan Hombu Dojo in Tokyo was built with the help of Tamano Construction, founded by Toshio Tamano’s father.

Although there were already Shorei-kan students and instructors in the United States, such as Jay Trombley in Texas, Shoichi Yamamoto of the University of Kansas, and John Roseberry in Nebraska, Toguchi sent Ichiro Takahata to the United States in 1968 as the representative of Shorei-kan and to establish a U.S. headquarters. Robert L. Willingham and Bill Mays were of great assistance in helping the Oklahoma Shoreikan Goju-Ryu style become established in Oklahoma and the surrounding region.

In 1969, Akira Kawakami traveled to New York City and joined Thomas Bodie at his uptown dojo before later moving to Oklahoma. That same year, Toshio Tamano also came to New York City, and it was decided that the U.S. headquarters would be established there with him. Kow Loon Ong was instrumental in helping the headquarters get started. In 1972, Toguchi sent Tomoaki Koyabu to Canada to teach Shoreikan. Over the following years, Toguchi and his wife, Haruko Toguchi, traveled numerous times to both Canada and the United States. Later, Tamano moved to Milan, Italy, to spread Shorei-kan throughout Europe, and Scott Lenzi is now the representative for the United States and South America. Vic Hargitt is the representative for Canada. Haribabu represents Asia, and Vahitha Haribabu represents India.

Vic Hargitt was the last person to receive the title of Shihan from Toguchi, in June 1997, and was also the last person to receive certification from a member of the Toguchi family. This certification was for the rank of Rokudan, awarded in July 2004.

== Death ==
Toguchi died at the age of 81.

== Bibliography ==
Seikichi Toguchi has written two books:

- Okinawan Goju-Ryu: Fundamentals of Shorei-Kan Karate
- Okinawan Goju-Ryu II: Advanced Techniques of Shorei-Kan Karate
