= Tensho (kata) =

Kata originating from Gōjū-ryū karate

Tensho is a kata originating from Gōjū-ryū karate. Translated, it means "revolving hands", "rotating palms", or "turning palms." This kata emphasizes the soft aspects of Gōjū-ryū, and encompasses continuous, flowing movements. Tensho, along with its harder counterpart sanchin, was developed by Gōjū-ryū founder Chojun Miyagi from earlier Chinese forms. Tensho may be a variant of the Southern Chinese Kung Fu form Rokkishu.

Tensho was created in 1921 as "softer sanchin" by Chojun Miyagi to balance Gō aspect of Heishugata (Sanchin-kata) with Jū variation for Heishugata. It combines hard dynamic tension with deep breathing and soft flowing hand movements.

Some styles call it Rokkishu and it was created from some movements taken from Hakutsuru, although more careful analysis suggests that it might be Miyagi's personal interpretation of Kakuha-kata that was in Higashionna's syllabus but is omitted in Gōjū-ryū now.
