= Ryūei-ryū =

Style of karate

- Date founded: 1875
- Country of origin: Okinawa, Japan
- Founder: Norisato Nakaima
- Arts taught: Karate
- Ancestor arts: Chinese boxing
- Ancestor schools: Naha-te
- Descendant schools: Ryuhoukai, Ryueiryu Karate Kobudo Hozonkai
- Official website: ryueiryu.org

Ryuei-ryu (劉衛流, Ryūei-ryū) is an Okinawan style of karate. It was originally a family style of the Nakaima family of Naha and is now one of the internationally recognized Okinawan Karate styles. It is practiced in the United States, Argentina, Chile, Venezuela, Europe, Mexico and Okinawa.

== History ==
This style of karate was first introduced to Okinawa around 1875 by Norisato Nakaima. Born of wealthy parents in Kume, Okinawa, Nakaima went to Fuzhou, China at the age of 19 for advanced studies in the martial arts.

In China, a former guard to the Chinese embassies in the Ryukyu Islands introduced Nakaima to a Chinese boxing teacher known as Ryū Ryū Ko, who also taught to Sakiyama Kitoku and, according to some sources, Kanryo Higashionna many years later. Nakaima was accepted, trained for 7 years and received a certificate of graduation from the master. He was trained in a variety of arts and skills ranging from combative techniques to Chinese medicine and herbal healing remedies. Before leaving China, Nakaima traveled to the Fujian, Canton, and Beijing areas, where he collected a number of weapons and scrolls in order to further his experience in the martial arts.

Nakaima returned to Okinawa and passed the Chinese boxing style in secret to his son Kenchu Nakaima, who then went on to teach it only to his son, Kenko Nakaima (founder of the Ryuei Ryu Karate and Kobudo Preservation Society). In 1971, at the age of 60, Kenko Nakaima realized that there was no longer a need to keep his family's fighting system a secret. He took on a group of 20 school teachers as karate students; it was at this point the name "Ryuei-Ryu" was first used to describe the art.
