= Okinawan martial arts =

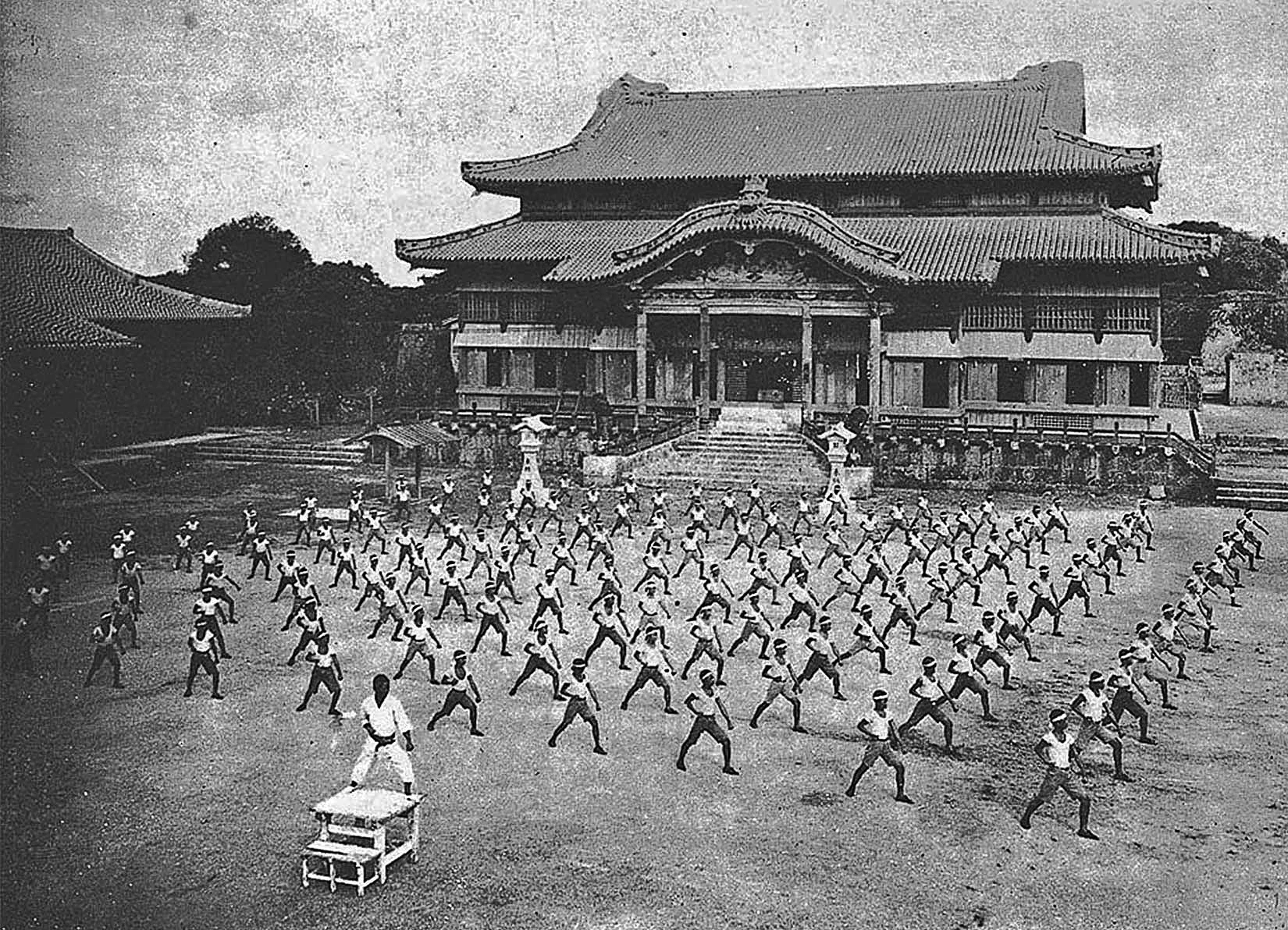
Karate training with Shinpan Gusukuma at Shuri Castle c. 1938, Okinawa Prefecture, Japan

Okinawan martial arts refers to the martial arts, such as karate, tegumi and kobudō, which originated among the indigenous people of Okinawa Island. Due to its location (between "Mainland Japan" and Taiwan), Okinawa was influenced by various cultures with a long history of trade and cultural exchange, including Japan, China and Southeast Asia, that greatly influenced the development of martial arts on Okinawa.

== History ==
In 1429, the three kingdoms on Okinawa unified to form the Ryukyu Kingdom with Chinese imperial backing. This led to significant contact between Chinese and Ryukyu envoys and traders. Okinawans combined Chinese martial arts with the existing local arts to form Tōde (唐手, Tuudii; Tang hand, China hand), sometimes called Okinawa-te (沖縄手, Uchinaa-dii). When King Shō Shin came into power in 1477, he banned the possession of weapons by the warrior class. However, Tōde and Ryukyu kobudō continued to be taught in secret. The ban was continued in 1609 after Okinawa was invaded by the Satsuma Domain of Japan.

Well into the 20th century, the martial arts of Okinawa were generally referred to as te or tii 手, Japanese and Okinawan for "hand". Te often varied from one town to another, so to distinguish among the various types of te, the word was often prefaced with its area of origin; for example, Naha-te, Shuri-te, or Tomari-te, for the villages of Naha, Shuri, and Tomari, respectively.

Karate (Okinawa-te or Karate-jutsu) was systematically taught in Japan after the Taishō era (after 1926).

== Shuri-te ==
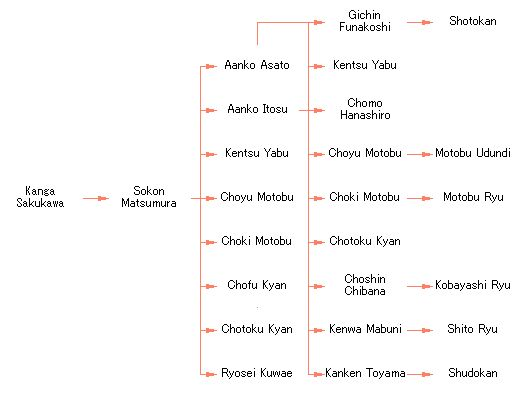
The genealogy of Shuri-te

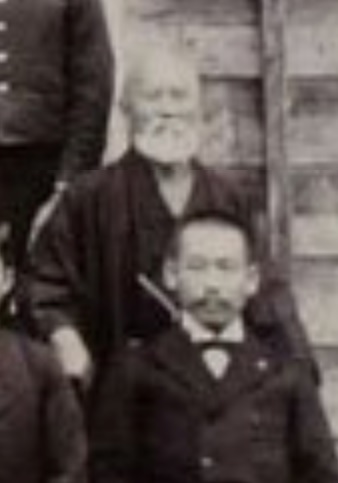
Ankō Itosu, often called the "Father of modern karate"

Shuri-te (首里手; Okinawan: Suidii) is a pre-World War II term for a type of indigenous martial art to the area around Shuri, the old capital city of the Ryukyu Kingdom.

Important Okinawan masters of Shuri-te:

- Sakugawa Kanga
- Matsumura Sōkon
- Bushi Tachimura
- Itosu Ankō
- Asato Ankō
- Chōyū Motobu
- Motobu Chōki
- Yabu Kentsū
- Chōmo Hanashiro
- Funakoshi Gichin
- Sato Toguchi
- Kyan Chōtoku
- Chibana Chōshin
- Mabuni Kenwa
- Tōyama Kanken
- Tatsuo Shimabuku

Important kata:

- Naihanchi
- Pinan
- Kūsankū
- Passai
- Jion
- Jitte
- Rohai
- Chinto
- Gojushiho

The successor styles to Shuri-te include Shotokan, Shitō-ryū, Shōrin-ryū, Shudokan, Shuri-ryū, Shōrinji-ryū, Isshin-ryū, Gensei-ryu, and Motobu-ryū.

== Tomari-te ==
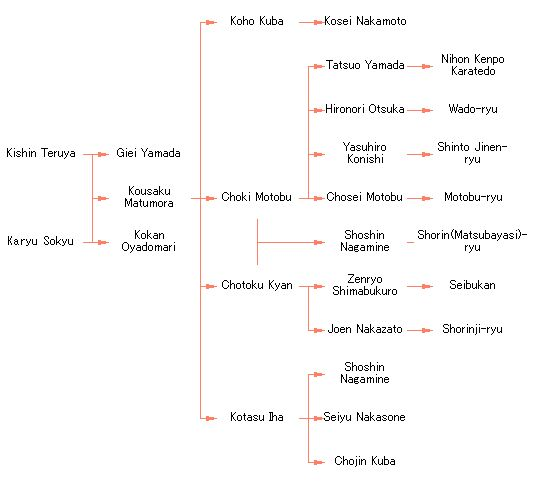
The genealogy of Tomari-te

Tomari-te (泊手; Okinawan: Tumai-dii) refers to a tradition of martial arts originating from the village of Tomari, Okinawa.

Important Okinawan masters of Tomari-te:

- Matsumora Kōsaku
- Oyadomari Kokan
- Motobu Chōki
- Kyan Chōtoku
- Nakasone Seiyu

Important kata:

- Naihanchi (Koshiki)
- Eunibu
- Rōhai
- Wanduan
- Passai (Tomari)
- Chintō
- Chinsu
- Chinpu
- Wankan
- Wanshū
- Seisan
- Jumu
- Nichin
- Juma
- Ananku

The successor styles to Tomari-te include Wado-ryu, Motobu-ryū, Matsubayashi-ryu, Shōrinji-ryū, and Shōrin-ryū.

== Naha-te ==
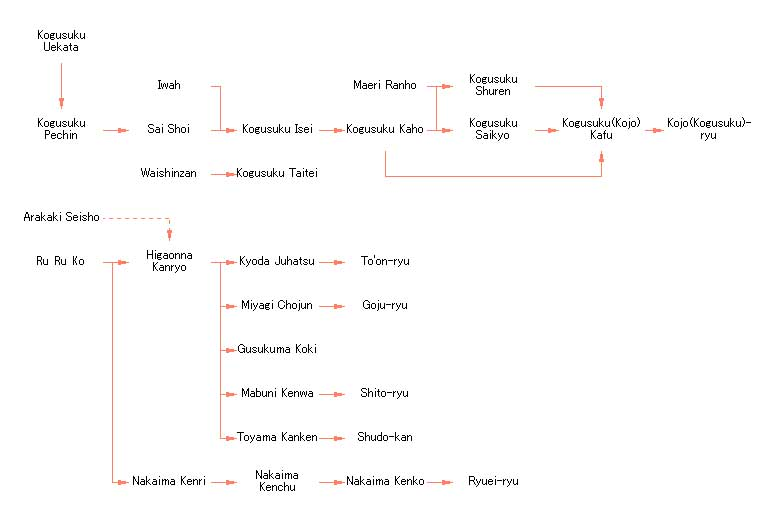
The genealogy of Naha-te

Naha-te (那覇手; Okinawan: Naafa-dii) is a pre-World War II term for a type of martial art indigenous to the area around Naha, the old commercial city of the Ryukyu Kingdom and now the capital city of Okinawa Prefecture.

Important Okinawan masters of Naha-te:

- Arakaki Seishō
- Higaonna Kanryō
- Miyagi Chōjun
- Kyoda Jūhatsu
- Mabuni Kenwa

Important kata:

- Sanchin
- Saifā
- Seiunchin
- Shisochin
- Seipai
- Seisan
- Sanseru
- Tensho
- Kururunfa
- Suparinpei
- Bechurin

The successor styles to Naha-te include Shōrei-ryū (earliest school), Gōjū-ryū, Uechi-ryū, Ryūei-ryū, Shito-ryu and Tōon-ryū.

== See also ==
- Okinawa
- Karate
- Japanese martial arts
- Peichin
