= Fujian White Crane =

Chinese martial art

Baihequan 白鶴拳
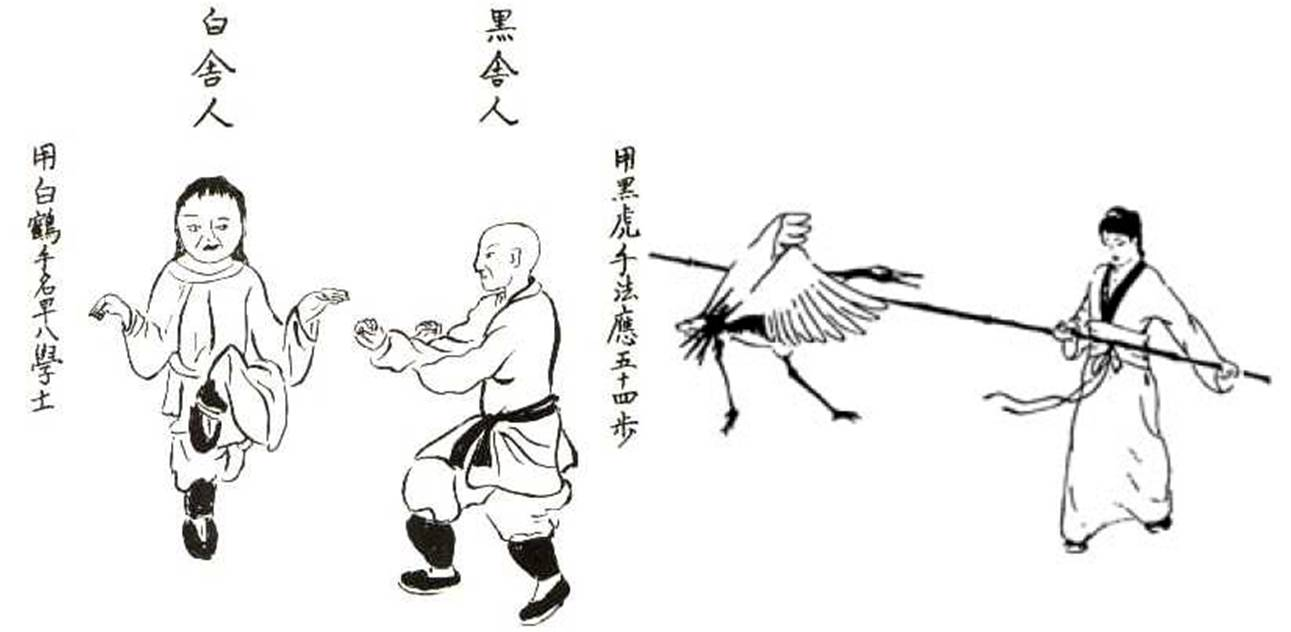
- Focus: Striking / Grappling
- Country of origin: China
- Creator: Fāng Qīnián (Note: While her father - Fang Zhonggong - was reputed practitioner of Nanquan, it was Qiniang who modified the martial arts knowledge her father taught her to form the basis of Fujian White Crane as a whole.)
- Famous practitioners: Lǐ Wénmào; Chen Zuozhen; Huang Laoyang; Hoi Wah Ho; Wu Xianggui (Go Ken Ki); Xie Zhongxiang (Ryu Ryu Ko)
- Parenthood: Ming-era Nanquan
- Descendant arts: Hakutsuruken (Okinawan White Crane); Karate (Note: Particularly Naha-te styles of Goju-ryu and Uechi-ryu. Would also influence Shito-ryu and Chito-ryu as well.); Hung Ga; Southern Praying Mantis; Wuzuquan

Fujian White Crane
- Traditional Chinese: 白鶴拳
- Simplified Chinese: 白鹤拳
- Literal meaning: white crane fist
Transcriptions
Standard Mandarin
- Hanyu Pinyin: Báihèquán
Yue: Cantonese
- Yale Romanization: baahk hohk kyùhn
- Jyutping: Baak^{6} Hok^{6} Kyun^{4}
Southern Min
- Hokkien POJ: Pe'h-ho'h-kûn

Fujian White Crane, also known as White Crane Boxing (Chinese: 白鶴拳) is a Southern Chinese martial art that originated in Yongchun County, Fujian (福建) province. According to oral tradition, the style was developed by Fang Qiniang (方七娘; Amoy Min Nan: Hng Chhit-niâ), a female martial artist. It is associated with traditional fighting techniques, including long range, but is most similar to close-quarter or hand-to-hand combat. It is most recognizable by the way the fighter imitates a bird's pecking or flapping of wings. While some white crane styles make use of traditional weapons, others have discontinued the use of weaponry.

Fujian White Crane descends in part from Shaolin Boxing and imitates characteristics of the white crane. This system is separate though related to Lohan Quan (Fujian Shaolin). The entire system of fighting was developed from observing the crane's movements, methods of attack and spirit, and may have evolved from the southern Shaolin animal styles.

There is no singular Fujian White Crane system. Multiple branches are collectively referred to as Fujian White Crane, including Sleeping, Whooping, Feeding, Flying and Jumping Crane styles based on imitative characteristics of their techniques. This group does not include Tibetan White Crane, which developed independently in western and southern China.

== Features and characteristics ==
The Fujian White Crane is a half-hard, half-soft style of Nanquan. It is a short-ranged fighting style where hand strikes are performed by imitating the crane's beak, with moves executed in conjunction with the movements of the practitioner's spine.

Techniques delivered with legs are limited, but include defensive kicking and sweep techniques. The style has a strict moral code to ensure the students do not use its techniques for malicious purposes.

For purpose of self-defense, this form uses various body parts (elbows, fingers, legs, palms, fists) and weapons, as well as movements that are coordinated, flexible and strong.

Fujian White Crane places emphasis on evading the enemy attack, to bait the aggressor to open themselves for practitioner's own attacks. Many of the style's movements are targeted towards vulnerable body parts, such as the temple and throat.

== History ==
=== The legend of the white crane ===
Fang Zhonggong, father of style founder Fang Qiniang, was one of the monks of the Southern Shaolin Monastery that is mentioned in many Nanquan legends. He was expert in the "18-fist boxing of the Lo Han" (Shiba Luohanquan). Upon the destruction of the monastery, Fang and other monks fled to Fujian province, in a neighboring county to Yongchun. There, he would have a daughter, Qiniang. As Qiniang was growing up, Zhonggong would teach his martial arts knowledge to her.

After her mother's death, Qiniang moved to Yongchun County, Fujian province, where many cranes live. After having moved there, she subsequently hears that her father has been killed in a duel, trying to protect his daughter's honor. This prompted Qiniang to seek revenge, but she had to improve her martial arts skills, if she was to fight the one who killed her father.

One day, while Qiniang was doing her chores, a crane landed nearby. Qiniang tried to scare the bird off using a stick and the skills she had learned from her father, but whatever she did, the crane would counter. Qiniang tried to hit the crane on the head, but the bird moved its head out of the way and blocked the stick with its wings. Qiniang tried to hit the crane's wings, but the crane stepped to the side and blocked the stick with its claws. Qiniang tried to poke the crane's body, but the crane dodged backwards and struck the stick with its beak. From then on, Qiniang carefully studied the crane's movements.

There are many versions of this legend. It is said that this incident was a dream of her doing her chores instead of doing it for real and only after waking up, she started revising her theories In other accounts, the crane does not block a stick, but evades and counters it. The point of the style is to emphasize evasion and attack an opponent's vulnerabilities instead of using physical strength.

Regardless, this crane encounter inspired Qiniang to combine the crane's movements with techniques learned from her father, ultimately creating the White Crane Style.

Since it was created by a woman, White Crane fighting elements are especially popular in women's self-defense training because the movements do not require great strength. They more closely imitate the delicate pecking motion associated with this fighting style.

=== Documented history ===
During the Shunzhi period of the Qing Dynasty (1644–1662) lived Fang Zhong (方種 - also known as Fang Zhangguang), a practitioner of Southern Chinese martial arts from Funing Prefecture, Fujian (now Xiapu County). Fang Zhong was from a wealthy family and renowned for excellent fighting skills, having trained with well-known martial arts masters. Fang Zhong lost his wife in his early years, who had given birth to only one daughter, Fang Qiniang (方七娘), and Fang Zhong taught his skills to her. According to the traditions of the Lee family branch of Flying Crane, Qiniang was born in the mid-17th century.

Fang Zhong and Fang Qiniang have held various aliases. Fang Zhong is a survivor from the end of the Ming Dynasty and had participated in anti-Qing and Fuming activities, having connections to Hongmen associates. Both have used pseudonyms to avoid being caught by the Qing government due to their anti-Qing activities. "Fangzhang" (方掌) and "Fangzhang" (方種) are believed to be the same person, and "Fangzhangguang" should also be "Fangzhang". "Fang Chung Gong", is a transcript of voice transmission. Fang Zhong also adopted the name "Fang Hui Shi" after defeat of anti-Qing forces.

One day, Qiniang saw a huge crane and attacked it with a stick. As she was unable to defeat it, she realized the crane had come to teach her, and developed her own unique techniques from the experience. Qiniang would modify her father's Nanquan techniques in the way that would serve as basis for what is now known as Fujian White Crane Kung Fu.

She had four principal students who later developed four main branches of Fujian White Crane: Eating, Crying, Sleeping, and Flying. Many systems evolved from each of the four original types of White Crane.

Zeng Si from Yongchun, married Qiniang and had two sons. Zeng Si and Qiniang returned to the Gu family's ancestral hall in Hou Temple, Rulin Village, Wulijie Town, Yongchun County to teach martial arts. Yongchun County is adjacent to Kinmen, which is the threshold for Taiwan. At the ancestral hall (coaching temple) there are paintings of White Crane Taoist and Zeng Si revered as the first teacher of White Crane.

In the Flying Crane tradition, Fang Qiniang never married, had children or a husband. Rather, she retired in Baihe An (white crane temple) and taught martial arts.

According to the Yong Chun Bai He tradition, the Ong Gong Shr Wushuguan was established in the town of Yongchun (永春; Minnan: eng2 chhun1), prefecture of Quanzhou, Fujian province, when its founders were taught by Fang Qiniang during the reign of the Jiajing Emperor (r. 1521–66) of the Ming dynasty.

Pingyang White Crane was created by Fāng Qī Niáng during Shunzhi period during the Qing dynasty. During Jiaqing period, this kongfu spread to Pingyang city. Yongchun-style White Crane was created by Fāng Qī Niáng during KangXi period during the Qing dynasty.

Li Wenmao (李文茂), an opera performer and leader of the 1854–1856 Red Turban Rebellion in Foshan, is said to have practiced the Yǒngchūn style of White Crane.

The Xu Xi Dao style of White Crane as taught by Chen Zhuozhen was derived from Zhong-Ho 'Springing Crane', and was developed in Taiwan by Huang Laoyang in the 1950s.

== Branches and schools ==
	Chinese	Pinyin	Minnan	
Sleeping Crane Fist	宿鶴拳	Sùhèquán	Siok4 Hoh8 Kun5	also known as Ancestral Crane
Crying Crane Fist	鳴鶴拳	Mínghèquán	Beng5 Hoh8 Kun5	also known as Calling, Whooping, or Shouting Crane
Eating Crane Fist	食鹤拳	Shíhèquán	Chiah8 Hoh8 Kun5	also known as Feeding or Morning Crane
Flying Crane Fist	飛鶴拳	Fēihèquán	Hui1 Hoh8 Kun5	aka Fei Hok Kuen
Shaking Crane Fist	縱鶴拳	Zònghèquán	Chiong3 Hoh8 Kun5	also known as Jumping Crane, as well as Jun Hok Kuen

=== Yongchun White Crane in China ===
The lineage of The Weng Gong Ci Gym in Yongchun County is:

- 方掌光 - Fang Zhang Guang
- 方七娘 - Fang Qi Niang
- 曾四 - Zeng Si
- 潘賢 - Pan Xian
- 潘堆金 - Pan Dui Jin
- 潘賽玉 - Pan Sai Yu, 潘敦池 - Pan Dun Chi, 潘大任 - Pan Da Ren
- 潘深恩 - Pan Shen En, 潘月照 - Pan Yue Zhao
- 潘利秋 - Pan Li Qiu
- 潘貞團 - Pan Zhen Tuan
- 潘孝德 - Pan Xiao De
- 潘成廟 - Pan Cheng Miao
- 潘瓊琪 - Pan Qiong Qi

=== Eating/Feeding Crane in Taiwan ===
The lineage of Feeding Crane in Taiwan is:

- 方七娘 - Fang Qiniang
- 曾四叔 - Zeng Sichu
- 鄭禮叔 - Zheng LiShu
- 蔡忠叔 - Cai Zhongshu
- 蔡公頸 - Cai Gongjing
- 林德順 - Lin Deshun
- 劉故 - Liu Gu
- 劉銀山 - Liu Yinshan
- 劉長益 - Liu Zhangyi (Liu Chang-I)

=== Sleeping Crane ===
Lin Chuanwu, originally from Chengmen in the Fuzhou area, studied this sub-style from the monk Jue Qing for 5 years at the Shimen temple.

=== Calling/Whooping Crane in China ===
At the end of the Qing Dynasty, Lin Shixian (林世咸), an expert in Yongchun Baihequan (永春白鹤拳), went to Fuzhou to teach his martial art. Among his disciples was Pan Yuba (潘屿八), who passed it on to others. Pan Yuba had also learned Luohanquan (罗汉拳). By the time this style was learned by Xie Zhongxiang (谢崇祥) in Changle, Fuzhou, it had undergone many changes and was called Minghequan.

==== Lineage ====
- Lin Shi Xian
- Pan Yu Ba
- Xi Zong Xiang
- Lin Zhen Lan - Chen Shi Ding - Huang Xing Xian
- Lin Jan Hua, Zheng Hui Sheng -Ruan Dong
- Lin Yuan Dun - Zheng Xian Qi

=== Jumping/Shaking Crane in Taiwan ===
- Fang Qi Niang
- Zheng Li
- Zheng Cong
- Li Seng
- Fang Shi Peng
- Fang Yong Cang
- Lin Guo Zhong
- Huang Xing Xian
- Zheng Xian Qi
- Huang Yi Xiong

=== Flying Crane ===
- Fang chi-niang
- Lee fah-sieng
- Lee mah-saw
- Lee kiang-kay
- Lee joo-Chian

== Influence on other styles ==
=== Karate ===
Fujian White Crane is noted to be major influence on Naha-te styles of Okinawan Karate. It accepted that Naha-Te, which is among the three major foundations of Ryukyu Karate, was created under the influence of Chinese martial arts. Wu Xianggui (Go Ken Ki) is believed to have introduced the Fujian White Crane techniques to the noted Naha-te pioneers.

The two schools of Naha-te, Goju-ryu and Uechi-ryu, use the routine "San Chian" from Fujian White Crane. San Chian is best known by the Japanese pronunciation of its name, Sanchin.

Uechi-ryu's relationship with Fujian White Crane remains vague. The school's founder, Kanbun Uechi, studied a martial art called "Pangai Noon" (half hard, soft) under unknown master (it was believed to be Zhou Zihe, but this is now disputed) in Fuzhou, Fujian Province, the latter passing down the "Sansen" (Sanjin) form to Uechi. Kenwa Mabuni would subsequently learn Sanchin from either or both Higaonna Kanryō and Chojun Miyagi, and integrate it into his Shitō-ryū karate.

=== Hung Ga ===
According to one of the founding legends of Hung Ga, Fang Qiniang became the wife of Hung Ga founder Hung Hei-gun and the two would combine Fang's White Crane style with Hung's White Tiger style, resulting in the Hung Ga kung fu. Per Roland Habersetzer, Hung Ga has been dubbed the "Tiger-Crane" style (Hu-he-chuang-xing-quan).

== See also ==
- Chin Na
- Shaolinquan
- Zhang Sanfeng
- Karate
- Kuntao
- Liu Seong Kuntao
- Yongchun County
