= Higaonna Kanryō =

Okinawan karateka

Kanryō Higaionna 東恩納 寛量
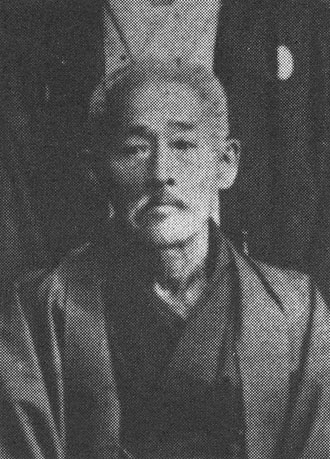
- Born: March 10, 1853; Nishimura, Naha, Ryūkyū Kingdom
- Died: October 1915; Naha, Okinawa
- Other names: Higashionna Kanryo, "Higashionna West"
- Style: Naha-te, Luohanquan
- Teachers: Arakaki Seishō, Kojo Taitei, Ru Ru Ko, Wai Xinxian, possibly also Iwah
- Rank: Kensei, Founder of Naha-te

Other information
- Notable students: Chōjun Miyagi, Kyoda Juhatsu, Tsuyoshi Chitose, Kenwa Mabuni, Koki Shiroma, Higa Seiko, Shiroma Shinpan (Gusukuma)

Higaonna Kanryō (東恩納 寛量, Higashionna Kanryō; March 10, 1853 – October 1915), and sometimes known as Higashionna West to distinguish him from his cousin, was a Ryukyuan martial artist who founded a fighting style known at the time as Naha-te. He is recognized as one of the first students of Fujian White Crane Kung Fu masters, namely Ryū Ryū Ko, in the Fuzhou region of China who returned with those skills to Okinawa. His student, Chōjun Miyagi, would later found Gōjū ryū Karate.

== Early life ==
Higaonna was born in Nishimura, Naha to a merchant family, whose business was selling goods to the north of Okinawa and shipping firewood back to Naha. Firewood was an expensive commodity in the Ryukyu Islands. His family belonged to the lower Shizoku class known as the Chikudun Peichin.

The characters of his family name (東恩納) are pronounced "Higaonna" in Okinawan, and "Higashionna" in Japanese. In Western articles the two spellings are often used interchangeably. He had an older relative, 5 years older, called Higaonna Kanryu who lived in Higashimura and was known as "Higashionna East".

== Martial arts ==
In 1867, Higaonna began to study Boxing from Aragaki Tsuji Pechin Seisho who was a fluent Chinese speaker and interpreter for the Ryūkyūan court. At that time the word karate was not in common use, and the martial arts were often referred to simply as Te ("hand"), sometimes prefaced by the area of origin, as Nafaa-Ti, Shui-Ti, or simply Uchinaa-Ti.

In September 1870, with the help of Yoshimura Udun Chomei (an Aji or prince), Higaonna gained the travel permit necessary to travel to Fuzhou, on the pretext of going to Beijing as a translator for Okinawan officials. There are records which show that in March 1873 he sailed to Fuzhou in the Fukien province of China. although this may have been a later trip to Fuzhou because accounts passed on by Chojun Miyagi refer to an earlier year of departure in 1870.

Aragaki had given Higaonna an introduction to the martial arts master Kojo Taitei whose dojo was in Fuzhou. Higaonna spent his time studying with various teachers of the Chinese martial arts, the first four years he probably studied with Wai Xinxian, Kojo Tatai and or Iwah at the Kojo Dojo. Kanryo then trained under a man referred to as Ryū Ryū Ko, but his name was never recorded as Kanryo Higaonna was illiterate. According to oral account, Kanryo spent years doing household chores for master Ryū Ryū Ko, until he saved his daughter from drowning during a heavy flood and begged the master to teach Kung Fu as a reward. Higaonna learned 4 kata whilst studying in China; Sanchin, Seisan, Sanseru, Bechurin (a cousin form of Suparinpei).

In the 1880s, after Ryūkyū was annexed by Japan, Kanryo returned to Okinawa and continued the family business. He also began to teach the martial arts in and around Naha. He began by teaching the sons of Yoshimura Udun Chomei. His style was distinguished by its integration of both go-no (hard) and ju-no (soft) techniques in one system. He became so prominent that the name "Naha-te" became identified with Higaonna Kanryo's system. He travelled to China several times thereafter. His last visit was in 1898 when he escorted Yoshimura Chomei and two of his sons to Fuzhou. History records that they were blown off-course to Zhejiang and travelled by land to Fuzhou with an escort provided by the local Zhejiang authorities.

Higaonna's most famous students were Chojun Miyagi who founded the Goju Ryu school of Karate and Kyoda Juhatsu who founded Touon ryu, a lesser known sister school of Goju Ryu which preserved 3 out of 4 of Higaonna's kata.

He began to teach Naha-te to the public in 1905 in the Naha Commercial School.

Kanryo was noted for his powerful Sanchin kata, or form. Students reported that the wooden floor would be hot from the gripping of his feet.

== Legacy ==
Several of Kanryo's students went on to become influential masters of what came to be called karate, amongst them Chōjun Miyagi, Kyoda Juhatsu, Kenwa Mabuni, Koki Shiroma, Higa Seiko, Tsuyoshi Chitose and Shiroma Shinpan (Gusukuma).

== See also ==
- Pechin
