= Gōjū-ryū =

Style of karate

Gōjū-ryū (剛柔流)
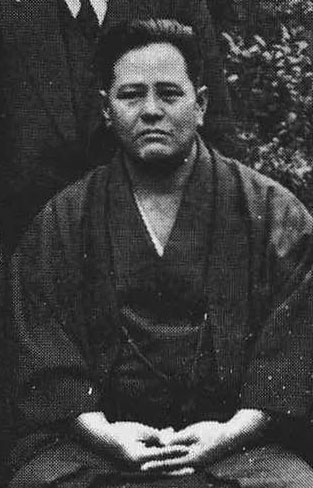
- Date founded: c. 1930
- Country of origin: Okinawa (Japan)
- Founder: Chōjun Miyagi (宮城 長順), 1888–1953)
- Arts taught: Karate
- Ancestor schools: Shōrei-ryū • Naha-te • Fujian White Crane (Whooping Crane style)
- Descendant schools: Kyokushin • Isshin-ryū Gosoku-Ryū

Gōjū-ryū (剛柔流), Japanese for "hard-soft style", is one of the main traditional Okinawan styles of karate, featuring a combination of hard and soft techniques.

Gō, which means hard, refers to closed hand techniques or straight linear attacks; jū, which means soft, refers to open hand techniques and circular movements. Gōjū-ryū incorporates both circular and linear movements into its curriculum, combining hard striking attacks such as kicks and close hand punches with softer open hand circular techniques for attacking, blocking, and controlling the opponent, including joint locks, grappling, takedowns, and throws.

Major emphasis is given to breathing correctly in all of the kata but particularly in the two core kata of the style, Sanchin and Tensho. Gōjū-ryū practices methods that include body strengthening and conditioning, its basic approach to fighting (distance, stickiness, power generation, etc.), and partner drills.

== History ==
The development of Gōjū-ryū goes back to Higaonna Kanryō, (1853–1916), a native of Naha, Okinawa. Higaonna began studying Shuri-te as a child. He was first exposed to martial arts in 1867 when he began training in Luohan or "Arhat boxing" under Arakaki Seishō, a fluent Chinese speaker and translator for the court of the Ryukyu Kingdom.

In 1870, Arakaki went to Beijing to translate for Ryukyuan officials. It was then that he recommended Higaonna to Kojo Taitei, under whom Higaonna began training.

With the help of Taitei and a family friend, Yoshimura Chomei (who was an Udun or Prince) Higaonna eventually managed to set up safe passage to China, lodging, and martial arts instruction. In 1873 he left for Fuzhou in Fujian, China, where he began studying Chinese martial arts under various teachers.

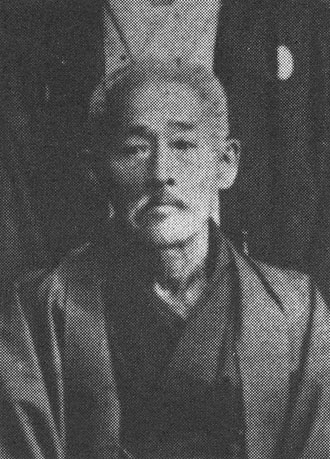
Higaonna Kanryō, c. early 1900s

In 1877 he began to study under Ryū Ryū Ko. Tokashiki Iken has identified him as Xie Zhongxiang, founder of Whooping Crane Kung Fu. Zhongxiang taught several Okinawan students who went on to become karate legends. However, since Ryu Ryu Ko had died by 1915 when Chojun Miyagi went to Fuzhou in search of him, and Xie Zhong Xiang died in 1926, the two may not be the same person.

Higaonna returned to Okinawa in 1882 and continued in the family business of selling firewood, while teaching a new school of martial arts, distinguished by its integration of gō-no (hard) and jū-no (soft) kenpō into one system. Higaonna's style was known as a type of Naha-te. Naha-te included other earlier teachers such as Arakaki Seisho and the Kojo family style. However, after Japan annexed Okinawa and defeated China in the Sino-Japanese War, the Patron of Naha-te, Yoshimura Udun, and his pro-China faction lost power in Okinawan politics, they migrated to Fuzhou, Taiwan or Hawaii and the older schools of Naha-te were largely lost. Through this period until 1905 when karate was openly taught in Okinawan schools, Kanryo Higaonna kept Naha-te alive by giving students private lessons at his home.

Gōjū-kai history considers Chinese Nanpa Shorin-ken to be the strain of kung fu that influenced this style.

Higaonna Morio (no relation with Kanryo's family) noted that in 1905, Higaonna Kanryō taught martial arts in two different ways, according to the type of student: At home, he taught Naha-te as a martial art whose ultimate goal was to be able to kill the opponent; however, at Naha Commercial High School, he taught karate as a form of physical, intellectual and moral education.

Higaonna Kanryo's most prominent student was Chōjun Miyagi (1888–1953), the son of a wealthy shop owner in Naha, who began training under Higaonna at the age of 14. Miyagi had begun his martial arts training under Ryuko Arakaki at age 11, and it was through Ryuko Arakaki that he was introduced to Higaonna. Miyagi trained under Higaonna for 15 years until Higaonna's death in 1916.

In 1915 Miyagi and a friend, Gokenki, went to Fuzhou in search of Higaonna's teacher. They stayed for a year and studied under several masters but the old school was gone due to the Boxer Rebellion. Shortly after their return, Higaonna died. In 1917 Chojun Miyagi once again went to Fuzhou for a short visit to explore local martial arts schools. After he returned, many of Higaonna's students continued to train with Miyagi and he introduced a kata called Tensho around 1918, which he had adapted from Rokkishu of Fujian White Crane.

In 1929 delegates from around Japan were meeting in Kyoto for the All Japan Martial Arts Demonstration. Miyagi was unable to attend, and so he in turn asked his top student Jin'an Shinzato to go. While Shinzato was there, one of the other demonstrators asked him the name of the martial art he practiced. At this time, Miyagi had not yet named his style. Not wanting to be embarrassed, Shinzato improvised the name hanko-ryu ("half-hard style"). On his return to Okinawa Prefecture, he reported this incident to Chōjun Miyagi, who decided on the name Gōjū-ryū ("hard soft style") as a name for his style. Chojun Miyagi took the name from a line of the poem Hakku Kenpo, which roughly means: "The eight laws of the fist," and describes the eight precepts of the martial arts. This poem was part of the Bubishi and reads, Ho wa Gōjū wa Donto su "the way of inhaling and exhaling is hardness and softness," or "everything in the universe inhales soft and exhales hard."

In March 1934, Miyagi wrote Karate-do Gaisetsu ("Outline of Karate-do (Chinese Hand Way)"), to introduce karate-do and to provide a general explanation of its history, philosophy, and application. This handwritten monograph is one of the few written works composed by Miyagi himself.

Miyagi's house was destroyed during World War II. In 1950, several of his students began working to build a house and dojo for him in Naha, which they completed in 1951. In 1952, they came up with the idea of creating an organization to promote the growth of Gōjū-ryū. This organization was called Gōjū-ryū Shinkokai ("Association to Promote Gōjū-ryū"). The founding members were Seko Higa, Keiyo Matanbashi, Jinsei Kamiya, and Genkai Nakaima.

In 1940 Chojun Miyagi created the kata Geki-Sai-dai-Ichi and Geki-Sai-dai-ni. Geki-sai-dai-Ichi was also incorporated into the Okinawan Karate tradition as Fukyugata-Dai-Ni. Fukyugata-Dai-Ni is practiced by other schools such as Kobayashi Shorin-Ryu and Matsubayashi Shorin-Ryu.

There are two years that define the way Gōjū-ryū has been considered by the Japanese establishment: the first, 1933, is the year Gōjū-ryū was officially recognized as a budō in Japan by the DNBK Dai Nippon Butoku Kai, in other words, it was recognized as a modern martial art, or gendai budō by the Japanese Government. The second year, 1998, is the year the semi-governmental Nippon Kobudo Kyokai (Japan Traditional Martial Arts Association), under the Cultural Ministry of Japan, recognized Gōjū-ryū Karate-do as an ancient form of traditional martial art (koryū) and as a bujutsu. This recognition as a koryū bujutsu shows a change in how Japanese society sees the relationships between Japan, Okinawa and China.

After Miyagi's death (1953), for some sources, the family communicated that the founder of the style wanted Eiichi Miyazato to succeed him. The Gōjū-ryū committee, formed by major students of Miyagi (which included among others Nakaima, Madanbashi, Meitoku Yagi, Iha Koshin) at a meeting in February 1954 voted almost unanimously for Eiichi Miyazato as the official successor to Chojun Miyagi. However, for other sources, including Eiichi Miyazato's students and heirs, no official successor to Chojun Miyagi was ever designated.

Until 1998, the only karate styles recognized as Koryu Bujutsu were newer styles founded in mainland Japan such as Wado Ryu and Itosu Ryu. Gōjū-ryū was the first style recognized by the NKK(Nippon Kobudo Kyokai), and Gōjū-ryū's official representative with the NKK was Morio Higaonna, and the organization he founded, the IOGKF was Gōjū-ryū's representative organization in the NKK.

== Philosophy ==
Miyagi believed that "the ultimate aim of karate-do was to build character, conquer human misery, and find spiritual freedom".

He stated that it was important to balance training for self-defense with "training the mind, or cultivating the precept karate-do ni sente nashi ('there is no first strike in karate')"; he also emphasized the importance of "cultivating intellect before strength".

Miyagi chose the name Gōjū-ryū, with "gō" (剛) meaning "hard" and "jū" (柔) meaning "soft", to emphasize that his style integrated both "hard" and "soft" styles. Gōjū applies not just to karate, but to life in general; only hardness or only softness will not enable one "to deal effectively with the fluctuations of life". When blocking, "the body is soft and inhaling"; when striking, the body is "hard and exhaling".

== Kata ==
Gōjū-ryū has 12 core kata in its standard curriculum. In some schools, practitioners are required to know all of these kata before reaching sandan (3rd degree black belt) or, more commonly, for godan (5th degree black belt).

Morio Higaonna writes that "Karate begins and ends with kata. Kata is the essence and foundation of karate and it represents the accumulation of more than 1000 years of knowledge. Formed by numerous masters throughout the ages through dedicated training and research, the kata are like a map to guide us, and as such should never be changed or tampered with."

Almost all of the kata have a corresponding bunkai oyo, a prearranged two-person fighting drill. These drills help the student to understand the applications of the kata, establish proper rhythm/flow, to practice constant attack/defense, and to safely practice dangerous moves on a partner.

=== Kihongata ===
Kihongata (基本型) means a "kata of basics." In Gōjū-ryū, Sanchin kata is the foundation to all other Gōjū kata because it teaches basic movements, basic techniques, power generation and breathing techniques from qigong.. It is also the foundation of body conditioning. The more the karateka practices this kata, the more his Heishugata will change. First variation of Sanchin-kata (sanchin kata dai-ichi) serves as Kihongata.

==== Gekisai ====
Gekisai (kanji: 撃砕; katakana: ゲキサイ) means "attack and smash". These kata were created around 1940 by Chojun Miyagi and Nagamine Shoshin as beginners' kata, to introduce the basic forms of karate (kihon) to middle school students in Okinawa, to help bring about the standardization of karate, and to teach a basic set of techniques for self-defense. Gekisai kata were strongly influenced by the Shuri-te techniques that Miyagi learned from Anko Itosu.

Students first learn gekisai dai ichi and then gekisai dai ni. The main difference between dai ichi and dai ni is that dai ni introduces open handed techniques and new stances. It is in gekisai dai ni that students are introduced to the neko ashi dachi stance, and to the wheel block (mawashi uke).

==== Saifa ====
Saifa (Kanji: 砕破; Katakana: サイファ) means "rip and tear" or "rip and destroy". Saifa has its origins in China, and was brought to Okinawa by Higashionna. It contains quick whipping motions, hammerfists, and back fist strikes; it particularly emphasizes moving off-line from an opponent's main force, while simultaneously closing distance and exploding through them. This is usually the first advanced Gōjū-ryū kata the students learn in most Gōjū-ryū dojos after gekisai dai ichi and gekisai dai ni are mastered.

==== Sanchin ====
Sanchin (Kanji: 三戦; Katakana: サンチン) means "three battles". This kata is a sort of moving meditation, whose purpose is to unify the mind, body and spirit. The techniques are performed very slowly so that the student masters precise movements, breathing, stance/posture, internal strength, and stability of both mind and body.

Sanchin is the foundation for all other kata, and is generally considered to be the most important kata to master. When new students came to Miyagi, he would often train them for three to five years before introducing them to sanchin. He would make them train very hard, and many of them quit before learning sanchin. Those that remained would focus almost exclusively on sanchin for two to three years. Miyagi's sanchin training was very harsh, and students would often leave practice with bruises from him checking their stance.

==== Tensho ====
Tensho (転掌) means "revolving hands." Like sanchin, tensho is a form of moving meditation; tensho combines hard dynamic tension with soft flowing hand movements, and concentrates strength in the tanden. Tensho can be considered the ju (soft) counterpart of the sanchin's go (hard) style.

=== Kaishukata ===
Kaishukata means a "kata with open hands". This is more advanced than Heishugata. Kaishukata serves as a "combat application reference" kata and is open to vast interpretation (Bunkai) of its movements' purpose (hence, "open hands").

- Seiunchin (制引戦) (attack, conquer, suppress; also referred to as "to control and pull into battle") demonstrates the use of techniques to unbalance, throw and grapple, contains close-quartered striking, sweeps, take-downs and throws.
- Shisochin (四向戦) ("to destroy in four directions" or "fight in four directions") integrates powerful linear attacks (shotei zuki) and circular movements and blocks. It was the favorite kata of the late Miyagi.
- Sanserū (三十六手) (36 hands) teaches how to move around the opponent in close quarters fights, and emphasizes the destruction of the opponent's mobility by means of kansetsu geri.
- Sepai (十八手) (18 hands) incorporates both the four directional movements and 45° angular attacks and implements techniques for both long distance and close quarter combat. This was a Seikichi Toguchi's specialty kata.
- Kururunfa (久留頓破) (holding on long and striking suddenly) is based on the Chinese praying mantis style. It was Ei'ichi Miyazato's specialty kata.
- Seisan (十三手) (13 Hands) is thought to be one of the oldest kata that is widely practiced among other Naha-te schools. Other ryuha also practice this kata or other versions of it.
- Suparinpei (壱百零八) (108 Hands), also known as Pechurin, is the most advanced Gōjū-ryū kata. Initially it had three levels to master (go, chu, and jo). Later, Miyagi left only one, the highest, "jo" level. This was a Meitoku Yagi's, Masanobu Shinjo, and Morio Higaonna's specialty kata.

=== Fukyugata ===
In 1940, General Hajime Hayakawa (早川 元), the installed governor of Okinawa, assembled the Karate-Do Special Committee, composed by Ishihara Shochoku (chairman), Miyagi Chojun, Kamiya Jinsei, Shinzato Jinan, Miyasato Koji, Tokuda Anbun, Kinjo Kensei, Kyan Shinei, and Nagamine Shoshin. The goal was to create a series of Okinawan kata to teach physical education and very basic Okinawan 'independent style' martial arts to school children. Their goal was not to create a standardized karate as the Japanese had been doing with kendo and judo for the sake of popularization.

These kata are not traditional Gōjū-ryū kata; instead, they are "promotional kata", simple enough to be taught as part of physical education programs at schools and part of a standardized karate syllabus for schools, independent of the sensei's style.

Shoshin Nagamine (Matsubayashi Shorin-Ryū) and Miyagi Chojun developed fukyugata dai ichi, which is part of the current Matsubayashi Shorin Ryu syllabus and further developed fukyugata dai ni, which is part of the current Gōjū-ryū syllabus under the name gekisai dai ichi. Some Gōjū-ryū dojos still practice fukyugata dai ichi. Miyagi also created gekisai dai ni, but it is practiced by Gōjū-ryū and some offshoots only.

== Notable practitioners ==
- Chōjun Miyagi (founder)
- Peter Archer
- Masashi Ishibashi
- Tino Ceberano
- Sonny Chiba
- Giga Chikadze
- Teruo Chinen
- Gunnar Nelson
- Seiko Higa
- Morio Higaonna
- Robert Mark Kamen
- Katja Kankaanpää
- Kenji Kurosaki
- Ralph Macchio
- Eiichi Miyazato
- Damian Priest
- Tadashi Sawamura
- Jeff Speakman
- Paul Starling
- Seigo Tada
- Ayumi Uekusa
- Peter Urban
- Atsuko Wakai
- Michael Jai White
- Robert Whittaker
- Meitoku Yagi
- Gōgen Yamaguchi

== See also ==
- Karate kata
