= Chōjun Miyagi =

Okinawan karateka

Chōjun Miyagi 宮城 長順
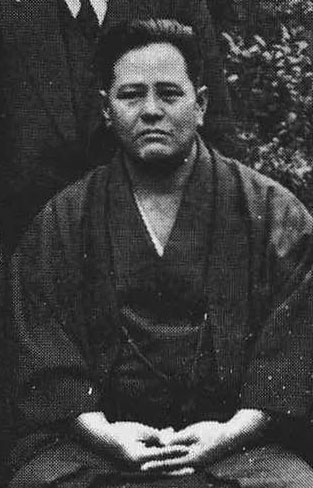
- Born: April 25, 1888; Naha, Okinawa, Empire of Japan
- Died: October 8, 1953 (aged 65); Okinawa, USCAR
- Style: Gōjū-ryū Karate (founder); Okinawan martial arts (Naha-te), Fujian White Crane (Crying Crane style), Southern Buddhist Kung Fu
- Teacher: Kanryo Higaonna
- Rank: Sōke, Founder of Goju-ryu, Kyoshi - Dai Nippon Butokukai

Other information
- Notable students: Teruo Chinen, Gogen Yamaguchi, Seiko Higa, Seikichi Toguchi, Tatsuo Shimabuku, Ei'ichi Miyazato, Meitoku Yagi, Seigo Tada

Chōjun Miyagi (宮城 長順, Miyagi Chōjun; April 25, 1888 – October 8, 1953) was an Okinawan martial artist who founded the Gōjū-ryū school of karate by blending Okinawan and Chinese influences.

== Life ==
=== Early life and training ===
Sensei Miyagi was born in Higashimachi, Naha, Okinawa on April 25, 1888. One of his parents was a wealthy shop owner. Chojun Miyagi began studying Okinawan martial arts under Ryuko Aragaki at age 11. At age 14, Miyagi was introduced to Kanryo Higashionna (Higaonna Kanryō) by Aragaki. Under his tutelage, Miyagi underwent a very long and arduous period of training. His training with Higaonna was interrupted for a two-year period while Miyagi completed his military service, 1910–1912, in Miyakonojō, Miyazaki. Miyagi trained under Higaonna for 15 years until Higaonna's death in 1916.

=== Training in China ===
In May 1915, before the death of Higaonna, Miyagi travelled to Fujian Province. In China he visited the grave of Higaonna's teacher, Ryū Ryū Ko. In this first trip he travelled with Eisho Nakamoto. After Kanryo Higaonna's death (in Oct, 1915) he made a second trip to Fuzhou with Gokenki. In this second trip he studied some local Chinese martial arts. It was in this second trip that he observed the Rokkishu (a set of hand exercises rather than a formal kata, which emphasizes the rotation of the forearms and wrists to execute offensive and defensive techniques), which he then adapted into the Tensho Kata. From the blending of these systems, and his native Naha-Te, a new system emerged. However, it was not until 1929 that Chōjun Miyagi named the system Gōjū-ryū, meaning "hard soft style".

=== Return to Japan ===
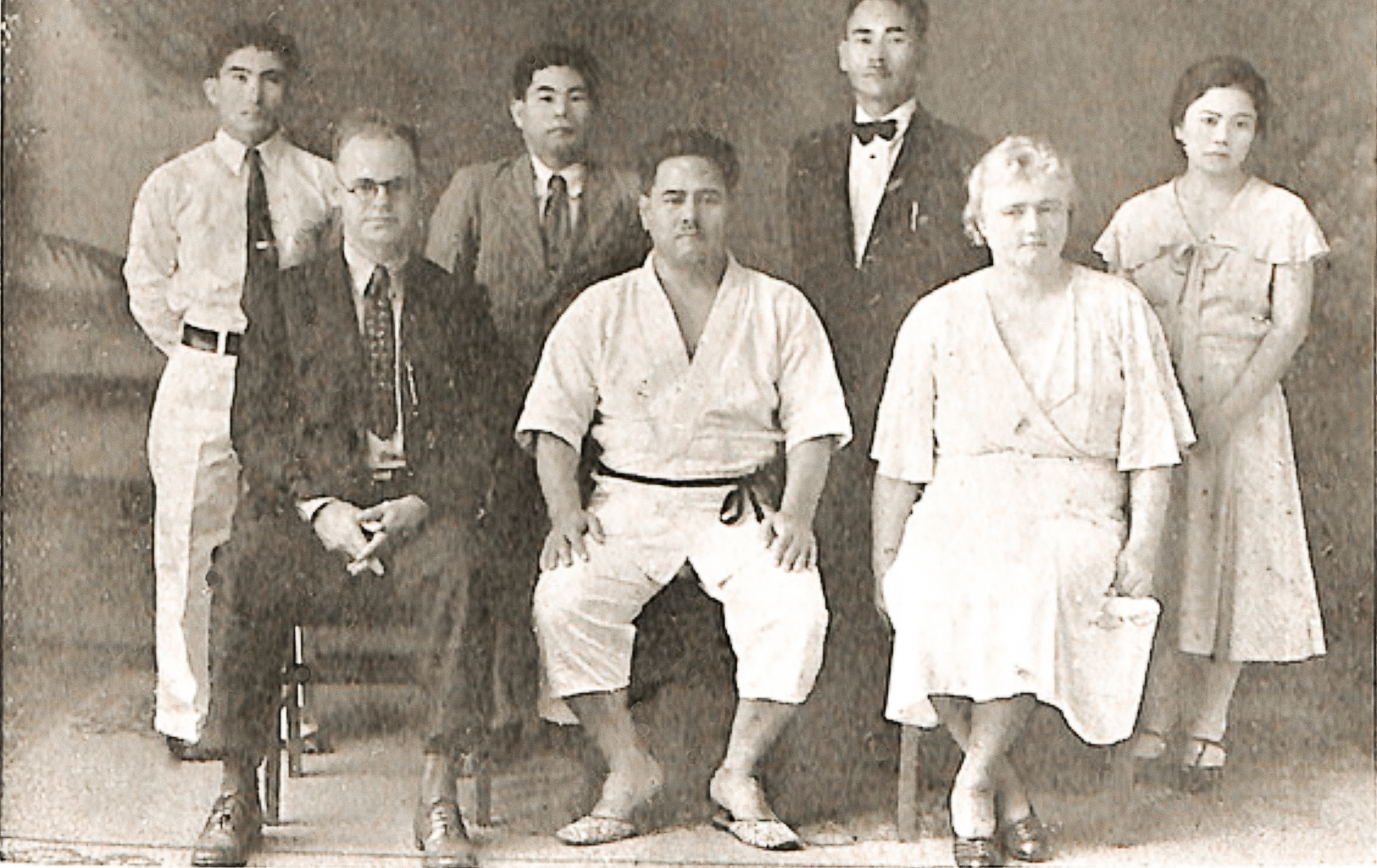
Miyagi Chojun in Hawaii (1934 or 35)

After several months in China, Chōjun Miyagi returned to Naha where he opened a dojo. He taught for many years, gaining an enormous reputation as a karateka. According to some stories, when students started training under Miyagi Sensei, for the first 6-12 months he did not teach them any Karate techniques, and instead gave them chores in the backyard such as moving rocks or trees. This both strengthened his students and also made sure that only those who really had a strong character stayed. This also followed Higaonna's request from him "Do not teach Karate easily to people".

Despite his reputation, his greatest achievements lie in popularization and the organization of karate teaching methods. In recognition of his leadership in spreading karate in Japan, his style, Goju-Ryu, became the first style to be officially recognized by the Dai Nippon Butokukai. He introduced karate into Okinawa police work, high schools and other areas of society. He revised and further developed Sanchin—the hard aspect of Goju, and created Tensho—the soft aspect. These kata are considered to contain the essence of the Goju-ryu. The last kata taught in most dojos, Suparinpei, is said by some to contain the full syllabus of Goju-ryu, although this assertion is disputed. Shisochin was Miyagi's favorite kata at the end of his years.

The goal of unification of various karate styles which was 'in fashion' at that time (see Gichin Funakoshi for his works in Japan). The Japanese government sent envoys to Okinawa to promote that goal. Along with other Karate Masters, Miyagi Sensei partook in at least one such meeting with a Japanese bureaucrat, and expressed a partial willingness to go along with the standardization edicts issued from mainland Japan. In continuation of this, Miyagi Sensei created more Naha-Te-like katas known as Gekisai Dai Ichi and Gekisai Dai Ni in 1940, taking techniques from higher forms (notably Suparinpei, and upper blocks uncommon for Goju-ryu at that time) and incorporating them into shorter forms. It is said he created these kata to bridge the gap between Sanchin and Saifa, which contains much more complex moves compared to Sanchin, as well as to have forms to teach to his students in the Prefectural Teacher's College.

=== Death ===
Miyagi had his first heart attack in 1951, and died in Okinawa on October 8, 1953, from a second heart attack.

== Successor ==
Miyagi died without having officially named a successor, and several of his pupils have proclaimed themselves as his successors. However, Seikichi Toguchi is quoted as saying “Let me first say that I was not named the successor of Goju-Ryu by Miyagi, but nor was anyone else. There are some Goju-Ryu teachers who claim to have been privately appointed successor by Miyagi. These claims are ludicrous and disrespectful of his memory. He never publicly named anyone as successor. Common sense would dictate that if he were to appoint someone, it would have been a longtime student and it would have to be of public record to have any value." After Miyagi's death, his most experienced pupils at the time of his death were Sekō Higa, Meitoku Yagi, Eiichi Miyazato, Koshin Iha, and Toguchi himself.

The family of Chojun Miyagi communicated that the founder of the style wanted Eiichi Miyazato to succeed him. The Goju Ryu committee, formed by major students of Miyagi (which included among others Nakaima, Madanbashi, Meitoku Yagi, Iha Koshin) at a meeting in February 1954 voted almost unanimously Eiichi Miyazato as the official successor to Chojun Miyagi. Miyazato continued to teach from Miyagi’s Garden Dojo until 1957, when he built the Jundokan dojo with the help of the Miyagi family. Miyagi's family also donated Hojo Undo tools and Miyagi's Busanagashi statue to Miyazato, which became the symbol for the Jundokan.

Another important recognition was made by Miyagi's family in 1963 to Meitoku Yagi, publicly recognizing him as one of the successors of Miyagi and giving him one of Miyagi's karate gis and belts.

Later other students would proclaim themselves Miyagi's successors like An’ichi Miyagi (a claim supported by Morio Higaonna, who claims An'ichi as his main teacher) or Gōgen Yamaguchi, whom Peter Urban (in his book The Karate Sensei) says was named in Miyagi's will as successor.

== Legacy ==
Some of Miyagi's more notable students were Seko Higa (also a student of Kanryo Higaonna), Miyazato Ei'ichi (founder of the Jundokan dojo), Meitoku Yagi (founder of the Meibukan dojo, Seikichi Toguchi (founder of Shorei-kan Goju-ryu), and on the Japanese mainland Gōgen Yamaguchi who was the founder of the Gōjū Kai in Japan.

The character of Mr. Miyagi in the Karate Kid film series, written by Robert Mark Kamen (a Goju Ryu student of Toguchi - Kayo Ong lineage), was inspired by Chōjun Miyagi. In the sequel television series, Cobra Kai, it's established that they're actually distant relatives.

== Writings ==
- Miyagi, Chojun. "Karate-Do Gaisetsu. Outline of Karate-Do". March 23, 1934 (Showa 9). Reprint published in 1999 by Patrick McCarthy. Translated by Patrick and Yuriko McCarthy, 1993. Also in: Higaonna, Morio. "The History of Karate: Okinawan Goju-Ryu".
- Miyagi, Chojun. "Historical Outline of Karate-Do, Martial Arts Of Ryukyu". January 28, 1936. Translated by Sanzinsoo. In Japanese: "Ryukyu Kenpo Karatedo Enkaku Gaiyo", essay appeared in "Okinawano Karatedo" by Shoshin Nagamine (1975, Shinjinbutsu Oraisha) and "Okinawaden Gojuryu Karatedo" by Eiichi Miyazato (1979, Jitsugyono Sekaisha).
- Miyagi Chojun et al. "The Meeting of Okinawan Karate Masters" Fragment of the 1936 meeting records. Published as an Appendix of "Karatedo Dai Hokan", by Kanken Toyama. Pages 377-392 (Tsuru Shobo, 1960). (translated by Sanzinsoo)
- Miyagi Chojun. "Breathing In and Breathing Out in accordance with Go and Ju, a Miscellaneous Essay on Karate". First published in "Bunka Okinawa" Vol.3 No.6, August 15, 1942. Republished in "Chugoku Okinawa Karate Kobudo No Genryu" written by Masahiro Nakamoto, April 1, 1985, by Bunbukan. Translated by Sanzinsoo.
