= Sanchin =

Okinawan karate kata

三戦 (三戰, 三進, 参戦)
Japanese:	sanchin
Mandarin Pinyin:	sānzhàn
Min Nan POJ:	sam-chiàn
Literally	"three battles"

Sanchin (三戦) is a kata of apparent Southern Chinese (Fujianese) origin that is considered to be the core of several styles, the most well-known being the Okinawan Karate styles of Uechi-Ryū and Gōjū-Ryū, as well as the Chinese martial arts of Fujian White Crane, Five Ancestors, Pangai-noon and the Tiger-Crane Combination style associated with Ang Lian-Huat. Tam Hon taught a style that was called simply "Saam Jin" (Cantonese for "Sanchin").

The name Sanchin, meaning "three battles/conflicts/wars" is usually interpreted as the battle to unify the mind, body, and spirit; however, there are other interpretations.

Uechi-Ryū practices a form of Sanchin with nukite zuki (貫手突) "open spear hand" strikes, while the version used by most other styles such as Gōjū-Ryū and Chitō-ryū, use a closed fist.

== General information ==

Sanchin uses the sanchin dachi (三戦立ち) "sanchin stance" named for the kata. Practice of Sanchin seeks to develop the muscles and bones of the body to help the practitioner withstand blows from an opponent, while drilling the basic mechanics of a strike that depends on a stable base.

Sanchin is the first kata learned in Uechi-Ryū, while other styles may introduce it later. In Gōjū-Ryu, there are two Sanchin kata. The first, "Miyagi's Sanchin" or sanchin dai ichi, was created by Chōjun Miyagi. The second, "Higashionna's sanchin" or sanchin dai ni was taught with open hands, as in Uechi-Ryū, but later it was also revised to closed fists by Miyagi's co-student Juhatsu Kyoda, founder of Tōon-Ryū, and adopted by Chōjun Miyagi as well. This kata was adopted by other styles such as the later Okinawan style Isshin-Ryū, Kyokushin, and Koei-Kan.

Another difference within Goju-Ryu is the use of turns within the kata. Chojun Miyagi eliminated the two 180-degree turns in the kata late in his life. Some students, like Anichi Miyagi kept this standard, but others changed the kata back to the pre-change version after Miyagi died.

Morio Higaonna, student of Anichi Miyagi outlines the reason for the change, "When part of the body is not used, it degenerates. So it is with movement: human beings naturally move forward, not backward, and have developed their muscles and instincts accordingly. It was to develop this kind of backward movement that Miyagi Chojun Sensei revised Higaonna Kanryo Sensei's original Sanchin kata."

Seikichi Toguchi was one of Miyagi's senior students who changed the kata back after Miyagi died. He gives his version for the change, "In the pre-war classes, Miyagi taught the sanchin kata with two 180-degree turns. However, after the war, he remained seated and would not allow students to turn their backs on him. It was considered disrespectful to turn one's back on their teachers in Okinawa. Thus, the turns were subsequently eliminated from the original form and what remained in their place were three steps forward and three back. Therefore, the students who joined the dojo around 1950 learned this later version of sanchin...The technique of turning by crossing of legs is critical to goju-ryu koryu kata."

=== Shime (締め) ===
Some styles use a method of checking strength, posture, hand concentration during the performance of the kata called shime (締め). This involves a range of techniques from hard strikes to check the tone of the student's muscles and overall strength to very soft and slow pushes and pulls to test the student's ability to react in order to maintain their position.

== See also ==
- Karate stances
- Karate kata
- Tiger Crane Paired Form
- Naihanchi
