= Shūkōkai =

Style of karate

- Miyake Shūkōkai International logo
- Focus: Striking • Sports biomechanics
- Country of origin: Japan
- Creator: Chōjirō Tani
- Parenthood: Shitō-ryū • Gōjū-ryū • Naha-Te • Shuri-Te

Shūkōkai (修交会) is a style of Karate, based on Tani-ha Shitō-ryū, a branch of Shitō-ryū developed by Chōjirō Tani in the late 1940s, and refined by his students, including Yamada Haruyoshi, Kimura Shigeru and Ishitobi Kazuo.

== History ==
Chōjirō Tani (谷 長治郎 Tani Chōjirō) was born in 1921, and started his formal karate training under Miyagi Chōjun, who founded the Gojū-ryū style, while a student at the Doshisha University in Kyoto. After a few months, Miyagi Chōjun returned to Okinawa and recommended Mabuni Kenwa, the founder of Shitō-ryū, to Tani Chōjirō to carry on his learning. Upon graduating from university, Tani began learning Naha-Te, Shuri-Te, and Tomari-Te from Mabuni as well as studied Shin-den Fudo-ryu Jujutsu, Kobudo, and Shitō-ryū from Mabuni as well. After many years of training under Mabuni and becoming one of his most senior students, In 1946 Tani received the certificate of succession from Mabuni and founded his own school called Tani-ha Shito-ryu (literally translates to "Tani school" or "Tani's branch")

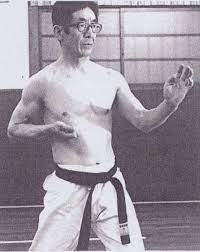

Tani built a Dojo attached to his house in Kobe where he proudly hung a wood carved sign above the entrance which said “Shukokai.”

The word Shukokai can be challenging to translate directly, but breaking it down into its individual components provides a clearer understanding of its meaning.

Shu can be translated to mean; Training

Ko can be translated to mean; Many people meeting; crossing; intersection; come together.

Kai can be translated to mean; Association; train under one roof

it is now often translated as meaning “the way for all.”

From its inception, Shūkōkai placed a strong emphasis on physics as well as the study of body mechanics, aiming to generate maximum force with minimal effort.

Shukokai Karate is distinguished by the way its techniques are executed, setting it apart from other styles despite sharing many of the same fundamental strikes, blocks, and kicks.

Tani developed the style with a relatively high stance to promote speed and agility, making it particularly fast in comparison to other Karate systems. One of its most notable technical features is the use of the double hip twist, a method that significantly increases the impact of strikes. These innovations, combined with Tani’s continuous refinement of basic techniques, gave Shūkōkai a reputation as one of the hardest-hitting forms of Karate.

In line with his focus on efficiency and effectiveness, Tani believed that every technique must be applicable in real combat situations. He emphasized that no matter how powerful, a technique held little value if it couldn’t be executed under pressure. His combat philosophy followed the ideal of ikken hissatsu—"to annihilate at one blow". Tani also always talked of the importance of etiquette, discipline and mental control.

Tani Sensei approached Karate as a practice unique to each individual. Rather than giving strict directives, he would ask his students, 'How does your body feel?' He recognised that no two people are the same and took the time to understand each student, guiding them in a way that best suited their own body and abilities.

To support the scientific foundation of his methods, Tani also published a book on the practical application of his techniques and their basis in sports biomechanics.

One of Tani's most senior students, Sensei Shigeru Kimura, left Japan in 1965 to teach Shūkōkai in Africa. He developed his own version of Shukokai, emphasizing its power and strength; and was regarded as an expert on the style. He continued to teach after travelling to Europe, before settling in the United States in 1970 at the age of 29, where he taught at Yoshisada Yonezuka's Cranford, New Jersey dojo for two years; creating the first Shukokai World Tournament in 1981. Sensei Kimura died of a heart attack at the age of 54. Tani died on 11 January 1998.

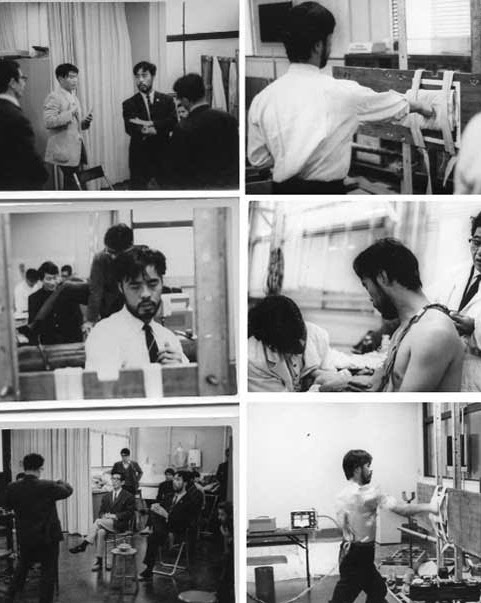
Kimura assisting with Tani's research regarding punching at a university in Japan

After the passing of Chōjirō Tani, a formal assembly of the Shukokai General Council was held on 28 June 1998 to address the future of both the Shukokai style and the Tani-ha lineage of Shitō-ryū Karate. The meeting resulted in the establishment of a new organization, named the Shitō-ryū Shukokai Karate-dō Union, intended to carry forward the traditions of the original school founded by Tani. Haruyoshi Yamada, holding the rank of 9th Dan Hanshi, was selected to serve as the inaugural head of the newly formed Union.

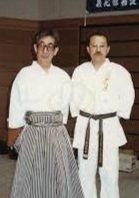
Tani and Yamada

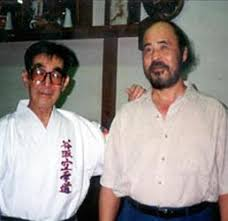
Tani and Kimura

== Grading ==
Shūkōkai Karate Belt Order
Black (Shodan)
Black (Shodan Ho -Intermediate)
Brown (3rd, 2nd and 1st Kyu)
Purple (4th Kyu)
Blue (5th Kyu)
Green (6th Kyu)
Orange (7th Kyu)
Yellow (8th Kyu)
Red (9th Kyu)
White (10th Kyu)

The belt assigned to each student upon commencing training is a white belt.

Certain Shukokai Karate associations do not have a red belt grade, making the white belt a ninth Kyu. In addition, certain associations also require a probationary black belt grade (Shodan-Ho) before progressing to fully fledged dan grading.

== Kata ==
As a direct descendant of Shitō-ryū, Shūkōkai incorporates elements from both Naha-te and Shuri-te, two foundational Okinawan karate systems. Kenwa Mabuni, who trained under both Kanryō Higaonna (Naha-te) and Ankō Itosu (Shuri-te), blended the techniques and principles of both traditions into Shitō-ryū.

This dual heritage is reflected in the kata practiced in Shūkōkai. Forms such as Sanchin, Tenshō, and Suparinpei originate from Naha-te and focus on breathing and internal energy. Kata such as Annanko, Matsukaze, and Bassai-Dai come from the Shuri-te tradition, known for fast, linear techniques.

Shūkōkai is also notable for its relatively high number of kata, a direct result of Mabuni’s extensive training and knowledge. His integration of multiple systems made him widely regarded as a kata expert in Japan.

=== List of Kata ===
The following is a list of kata practiced in Shitō-ryū Shūkōkai, grouped by kata family or origin:

==== Pinan Series ====
These are introductory katas designed to teach fundamental stances, transitions, and techniques. Note: The Pinan kata are also known as the Heian kata in some styles, such as Shotokan.

- Pinan Shodan
- Pinan Nidan
- Pinan Sandan
- Pinan Yondan
- Pinan Godan

==== Naifanchin (Naihanchi) Series ====
Focused on lateral movement, strength, and rooted stances.

- Naifanchin Shodan
- Naifanchin Nidan
- Naifanchin Sandan

==== Kosokun / Kūsankū Lineage ====
Often derived from the Kūsankū form, emphasizing fluid motion and dynamic transitions.

- Kosokun Dai
- Kosokun Sho
- Shiho Kosukun
- Chatanyara Kunsanku

==== Bassai (Passai) Lineage ====
These katas emphasize power and breaking through an opponent's defense.

- Bassai Dai
- Bassai Sho
- Matsumura Bassai
- Tomari no Bassai

==== Classical Shuri-te Based Kata ====
Known for linear techniques and explosive speed.

- Annanku
- Annan
- Matsukaze
- Rohai
- Wanshu
- Jurokono

==== Classical Naha-te Based Kata ====
Characterized by strong stances, breathing control, and internal tension.

- Sanchin
- Tensho
- Seienchin
- Seipai
- Seisan
- Kururunfa
- Shisochin
- Suparimpei
- Saifa

==== Other Traditional Kata ====
Various advanced and intermediate forms found in Shitō-ryū and Shūkōkai syllabi.

- Gojushio
- Chinte
- Chinto
- Heiku
- Hakucho
- Paiku
- Pachu
- Papuren
- Niseishi
- Nipaipo
- Jion
- Jitte
- Jiin
- Sochin
- Unsu
- Seiryu
- Seriu

== Branches ==
Shūkōkai has evolved into several independent style branches throughout the world over the past few decades:

- Kimura Shukokai grew out of the Shūkōkai school taught since 1978 in Hackensack, New Jersey, United States and later in Tenafly, New Jersey by Shigeru Kimura, a long time student of Tani. After Kimura's death in 1995, this international organization was formed to promote his style, co-led by his four senior students: Eddie Daniels, head of Shukokai Karate Federation, Bill Bressaw, head of American Shukokai Karate Union, Chris Thompson and Lionel Marinus of South Africa.
- Sankukai, founded in 1971 in Paris, France, by Yoshinao Nanbu, a student of Chōjirō Tani. Yoshinao Nanbu abandoned the style to create Nanbudō in 1978, and Sankukai is currently taught by several national organisations throughout the world.
- Kawata-ha Seikukai Karate founded in Kawanishi, Hyōgo, Japan after the death of Chōjirō Tani in 1998 by Kawata Shigemasa, his most senior student
