= Karate kata =

Kata practised in karate

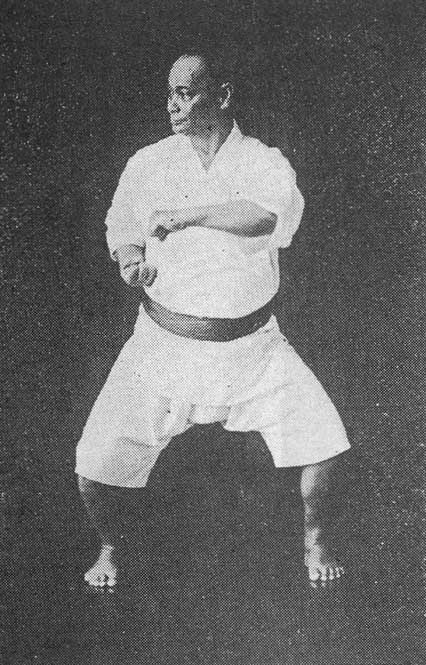
Motobu Chōki performing Naifanchi.

Kata (Japanese: 形, or more traditionally, 型; lit. "form") is a Japanese word describing detailed patterns of movements practiced either solo or in pairs. Karate kata are executed as a specified series of a variety of moves, with stepping and turning, while attempting to maintain perfect form. The kata is not intended as a literal depiction of a mock fight, but as a display of transition and flow from one posture and movement to another, teaching the student proper form and position, and encouraging them to visualise different scenarios for the use of each motion and technique. Karateka "read" a kata in order to explain the imagined events, a practice known as bunkai. There are various kata, each with many minor variations.

== Origins ==
Kata originated from the practice of paired attack and defense drills by ancient Chinese martial artists, these were known as the "five form fists" or "five patterns" after the fighting methods of five different animals. These were brought to Okinawa and were later used as the foundations for new kata to be devised.

Kata were created as solo forms containing the concatenated sequences of movements of the defensive portions of the drills. The initial forms being simply strings of movements, sets of rules were created to allow the creation of kata which could fit comfortably within training spaces.

== Teaching ==
Traditionally, kata are taught in stages. Previously learned kata are repeated to show better technique or power as a student acquires knowledge and experience. It is common for students testing to repeat every kata they have learned but at an improved level of quality.

As a library of technique, it is understood that kata works best through consistent repetition. The most basic kata continues to be performed by practitioners throughout their practice of Karate. This repetition is believed to perfect technique, strengthen the body, and ultimately act as a form of moving meditation that develops character.

The various styles of karate study different kata, or variations of a common core. Some kata may therefore be known by two names, one in Japanese, the other in Okinawan or Chinese. This is because Gichin Funakoshi, and others, renamed many kata to help Karate spread throughout Japan.

== Kata names ==
=== Chinese connections ===
The number 108 has mythological significance in Dharmic religions and is present in a number of traditional kata. This number also figures prominently in the names of Karate kata, predominantly those with an origin in Naha-te, including Goju-ryu. The advanced Gōjū-ryū kata, Suparinpei, literally translates in Fuzhounese to the number 108, while gojushi of Gojūshiho is the Japanese pronunciation of the number 54 (half of 108). The other Gōjū-ryū kata, Sanseru (meaning "36") and Seipai ("18") are factors of the number 108.

However this direct connection between Zen Buddhism and karate particularly has been discredited in recent times as both a modern Western misinterpretation and as part of a tendency towards nationalist religious homogenisation in the early unified Japan of the late 19th century. Other propositions for the origin of the number 108 in kata include the legendary story of Outlaws of the Marsh (of which there were 108), or from Yue Fei, a 12th-century Chinese general who created the Yibai Lingba Qinna (一百零八擒拿; "108 Locking Hand Techniques") of the Ying Sao (Eagle Hands) or Ying Kuen (Eagle Fist) which evolved into modern Chinese boxing that karate was influenced by.

== Kata performed in various styles ==
Some kata and styles are not included here, due but not limited to popularity and common usage for kata, and recognition (or not) of styles by the various governing bodies.

Kata	Gōjū-ryū	Shitō-ryū	Shōrin-ryū	Shotokan	Shuri-ryū	Wadō-ryū	Isshin-ryū	Gensei-ryū	Kyokushin	Tōon-ryū	Uechi-ryū	Ryukyu Kempo	Shindō jinen-ryū	Shukokai	Shōrinjiryū Kenkōkan	Chitō-ryū
Ananku		Yes	Yes		Yes			Yes					Yes	Some	Some	
Annan		Yes	Some										Yes	Yes		
Annanko		Yes											Yes	Yes		Some
Ansan / Yantsu		Yes								Yes						
Chinte		Yes	Some	Yes									Yes	Yes		
Chintō / Iwa Ame / Gankaku		Yes	Yes	Yes		Yes	Yes	Yes					Yes	Yes	Yes	Yes
Chinsu		Yes														
Fukyugata / Gekisai / Shinsei	Yes	Some	Some						Yes							
Gojūshiho / Useishi (some: dai and sho versions)		Yes	Yes	Yes					Yes	Yes			Yes	Yes		
Gung-Fu no Kata																Some
Happiken															Yes	
Hoen																Some
Jiin		Yes	Some	Yes										Yes		
Jion		Yes	Some	Yes		Yes								Yes	Yes	
Jitte		Yes	Some	Yes		Yes		Yes					Yes	Yes		
Juroku		Yes											Yes			
Kururunfa	Yes	Yes											Yes	Yes		
Kusanku / Kanku / Bokanku (some: dai and sho versions)		Yes	Yes	Yes	Yes	Yes	Yes	Yes	Yes				Yes		Yes	Yes
Naihanchi / Tekki (some: series of 3)		Yes	Yes	Yes	Yes	Yes	Yes	Yes	Some				Yes		Yes	
Nipaipo / Neipai		Yes											Yes	Yes		
Niseishi / Nijushiho / NanDanSho		Yes	Some	Yes	Yes	Yes				Yes			Yes	Yes	Yes	Yes
Bassai / Passai (some: dai and sho versions)		Yes	Yes	Yes	Yes	Yes		Yes	Some				Yes	Yes	Some	Yes
Enpi / Wansu / Wanshū		Yes	Yes	Yes	Yes	Yes	Yes	Yes	Some				Yes	Some	Yes	Some
Pinan / Heian (series of 5)		Yes	Yes	Yes		Yes		Yes	Yes			Yes	Yes	Yes	Some	
Rōhai / Meikyo		Yes	Yes	Yes		Yes		Yes					Yes	Yes	Some	Yes
Ryuko	Some		Some								Some					
Ryūsan																Yes
Saifā	Yes	Yes							Yes			Yes	Yes	Yes		Some
Sanchin	Yes	Yes			Yes		Yes		Yes	Yes	Yes	Yes	Yes	Yes	Yes	Yes
Sankakutobi															Yes	
Sanseiryu / Sanseryu	Yes	Yes									Yes					
Seichin											Yes		Yes			Some
Seipai	Yes	Yes						Yes	Yes				Yes	Yes		
Seiryu											Yes		Yes			
Seisan / Hangetsu	Yes	Yes	Some	Yes		Yes	Yes	Yes			Yes	Yes	Yes		Some	Yes
Seiyunchin / Seienchin	Yes	Yes					Yes	Yes	Yes			Yes	Yes			
Shihōhai																Yes
Shimpa		Yes											Yes			
Shisōchin	Yes	Yes											Yes	Yes		
Sōchin		Yes		Yes								Yes		Yes	Some	Yes
Suparimpei / Pechurin	Yes	Yes				Some								Yes		
Taikyoku / Kihon (some: series of 3 or more)	Some	Yes	Some	Yes	Yes	Some		Yes	Yes				Yes	Yes	Yes	
Tensho	Yes	Yes	Some		Yes				Yes					Yes		Some
Ten No Kata		Yes	Some	Some												
Tsuki No Kata									Yes							
Unsu		Yes		Yes										Yes		Some
Wanduan		Yes														
Wankan / Matsukaze		Yes	Yes	Yes				Yes						Yes	Some	

== See also ==
- Bunkai
- Kime
- Comparison of karate styles
- Hyeong
- Kihon
