= Japan Karate-Do Ryobu-Kai =

Governing body of the sport karate

Shindō jinen-ryū 神道自然流
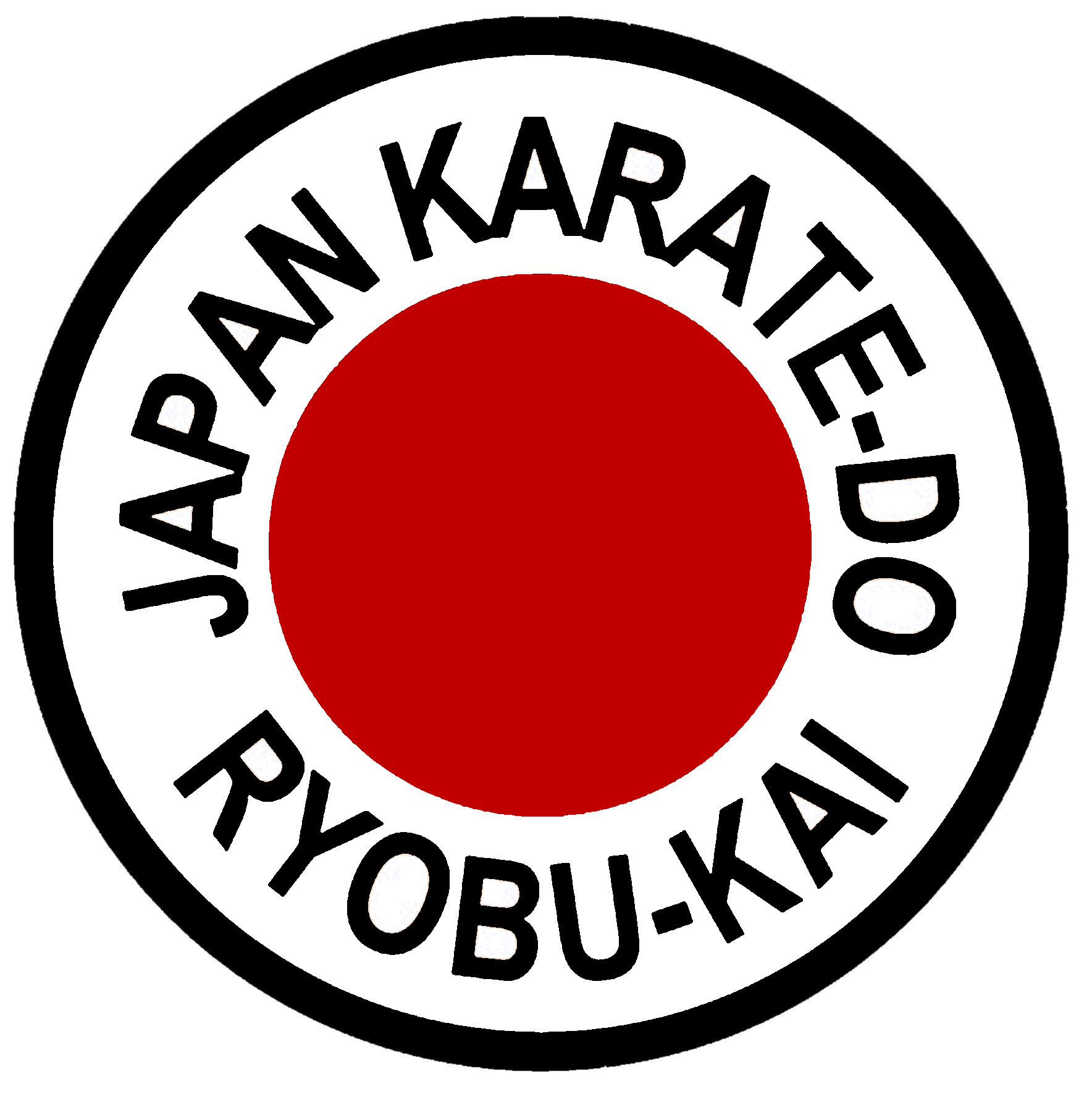
- Date founded: 1933
- Country of origin: Japan
- Founder: Yasuhiro Konishi (1893–1983)
- Current head: Yasuhiro (Takehiro) Konishi
- Arts taught: Karate
- Ancestor arts: Jujitsu
- Ancestor schools: Shitō-ryū • Shotokan • Motobu-ryu • Takenouchi-ryū
- Practitioners: Kiyoshi Yamazaki • Mina Yamazaki
- Official website: Japan Karate-Do Ryobu-Kai

Japan Karate-Do Ryobu-Kai (JKR) is an international karate organization under the leadership of Yasuhiro (Takehiro) Konishi, 10th Dan, son of the organization's founder Yasuhiro Konishi. It has branches in more than 20 countries under the guidance of Kiyoshi Yamazaki, 8th Dan, International Director and Chief Instructor.

The style of karate taught by the JKR is Shindo Jinen Ryu, which was established by Yasuhiro Konishi, who studied under and alongside Gichin Funakoshi, Chojun Miyagi, Kenwa Mabuni, and Choki Motobu. Konishi also trained extensively under the founder of Aikido, Morihei Ueshiba, and JKR's lineage dates back to the 16th century traditions of Takenouchi-ryū Jujitsu. Japan Karate-Do Ryobu-Kai is the sole governing body for Shindo Jinen Ryu, and it is the only major karate organization that has never experienced an internal schism.

Training within Japan Karate-Do Ryobu-Kai stresses traditional Japanese values of discipline, consistent attendance, etiquette, and hard work. Shindo Jinen Ryu incorporates elements of karate, aikido, jujitsu, and kendo in its curriculum, and also emphasizes both philosophy and education.

== Japan Karate-Do Ryobu-Kai ==
Japan Karate-Do Ryobu-Kai (JKR) is the original and only governing body for Shindo Jinen Ryu. It is an international karate organization under the leadership of Yasuhiro (Takehiro) Konishi, 10th Dan, son of the soke, Yasuhiro Konishi. It has branches in more than 20 countries under the guidance of Kiyoshi Yamazaki, 9th Dan, International Director and Chief Instructor. Japan Karate-Do Ryobu-Kai is the sole governing body for Shindo Jinen Ryu, and it is the only major karate organization that has never experienced an internal schism.

== Sources ==
- Ancient Okinawan Martial Arts, Volume 2: Koryu Uchinadi by Patrick McCarthy [Book]. Boston, MA: Tuttle Publishing. 1999
- Japanese Karate, Volume 1: Shindo Jinen Ryu. [Motion Picture]. Thousand Oaks, CA: Tsunami Productions. 1998
- Japanese Karate, Volume 2: Ryobukai and Shotokan. [Motion Picture]. Thousand Oaks, CA: Tsunami Productions. 1998
- Japan Karate-Do Ryobu-Kai Instructors Manual. 1996

== See also ==
Shito-ryu
