= Kaisai no genri =

Theory of karate

Kaisai no genri (解裁の原理) is a theory and set of rules of thumb which were used by Gōjū-ryū karate masters (Chōjun Miyagi, Seikichi Toguchi) to extract the primary fighting applications (Oyo) encoded into karate kata by the creators. These rules were historically kept secret and passed on to the most senior students of a school only near the death of the head of the organisation. Without such a rule set describing how kata are constructed, the likelihood of deciphering the original combative meaning of the movements in the kata is very low.

== Theory ==
The theory behind Kaisai no genri is that originally kata began as sets of paired drills or "sparring sets" practised by ancient martial artists. Over time large numbers of these drills became difficult to remember and so the defensive portion of the drills were assembled together into units and became the first kata. It is worth noting that these would probably have been Chinese martial art forms. By the time kata were created in Okinawa, the concept would have been well established.

The attacking methods were not recorded in the forms and are therefore unknown. However, they may be inferred from limb and body positioning and preceding and following movements through the process of bunkai or in Gōjū-ryū karate the process of Kaisai. It has been theorised by Patrick McCarthy that the drills and defensive routines recorded were responses to Habitual Acts of Physical Violence (HAPV Theory).

== The rule set ==
The rule set is broken down into three basic rules and two supplementary clauses.

=== Shuyo san gensoku - Three basic rules ===
Sources:

1. Don't be deceived by the shape (embusen) of the kata.
  The kata embusen is designed to allow the kata to be performed within a small space. The shape of the embusen has no bearing on the meaning of the techniques in the kata.
2. Techniques executed while advancing are offensive. Those executed while retreating are defensive.
3. There is only one opponent and he is in front of you.
  Turning to face a new direction while performing the kata does not mean you are turning to face a new opponent.

=== Hosoku joko - Supplementary clauses ===
1. The clause of implication,
2. The clause of substitution.

== Rule sets used by other karate masters ==
=== Kenwa Mabuni ===
In his book Kobo Kenpo Karatedo Nyumon, Shitō-ryū karate master Kenwa Mabuni wrote that when kata change direction, the angle turned to does not indicate turning to face additional attackers, but instead indicates the angle taken with respect to a single opponent attacking from the front.

== Books ==
- Kane, Lawrence; Wilder, Kris (2005). The Way of Kata: A Comprehensive Guide for Deciphering Martial Applications. Ymaa Publication Center. ISBN 978-1594390586.
- Toguchi, Seikichi (2001). Okinawan Goju-Ryu II: Advanced Techniques of Shorei-Kan Karate. Black Belt Communications. ISBN 978-0-89750-140-8.
- McCarthy, Patrick (1999). Ancient Okinawan Martial Arts, Vol. 2. Tuttle Publishing. ISBN 978-0804831475.
- Ashrafian, Hutan (2014). Warrior Origins: The Historical and Legendary Links Between Bodhidharma, Shaolin Kung-Fu, Karate and Ninjutsu. The History Press. ISBN 9780750957472.
- Tamano, Toshio (2013). Miyagi Chōjun no Okinawa Karate ni karate wo manabu (in Japanese) (1st ed.). Tokyo: BAB Japan. ISBN 978-4-86220-763-0.
- Mabuni, Kenwa (1938). Kobo Kenpo Karatedo Nyumon.

== Journals ==
- Lenzi, Scott (1995). "The Tensho kata the Smilling form of Goju-Ryu karate". Black Belt Magazine. 33 (10). Active Interest Media, Inc: 99. ISSN 0277-3066.
- Lenzi, Scott (1999). "Seikichi Toguchi - Goju-ryu Master left a lasting Legacy". Black Belt. 37 (9). Active Interest Media, Inc: 133. ISSN 0277-3066.
- Lenzi, Scott (2001). "Concealed techniques of Saifa kata of Okinawan Goju-ryu". Black Belt. 39 (11). Active Interest Media, Inc: 89. ISSN 0277-3066.
