= Shindō jinen-ryū =

Form of karate

Shindo Jinen-Ryu 神道自然流
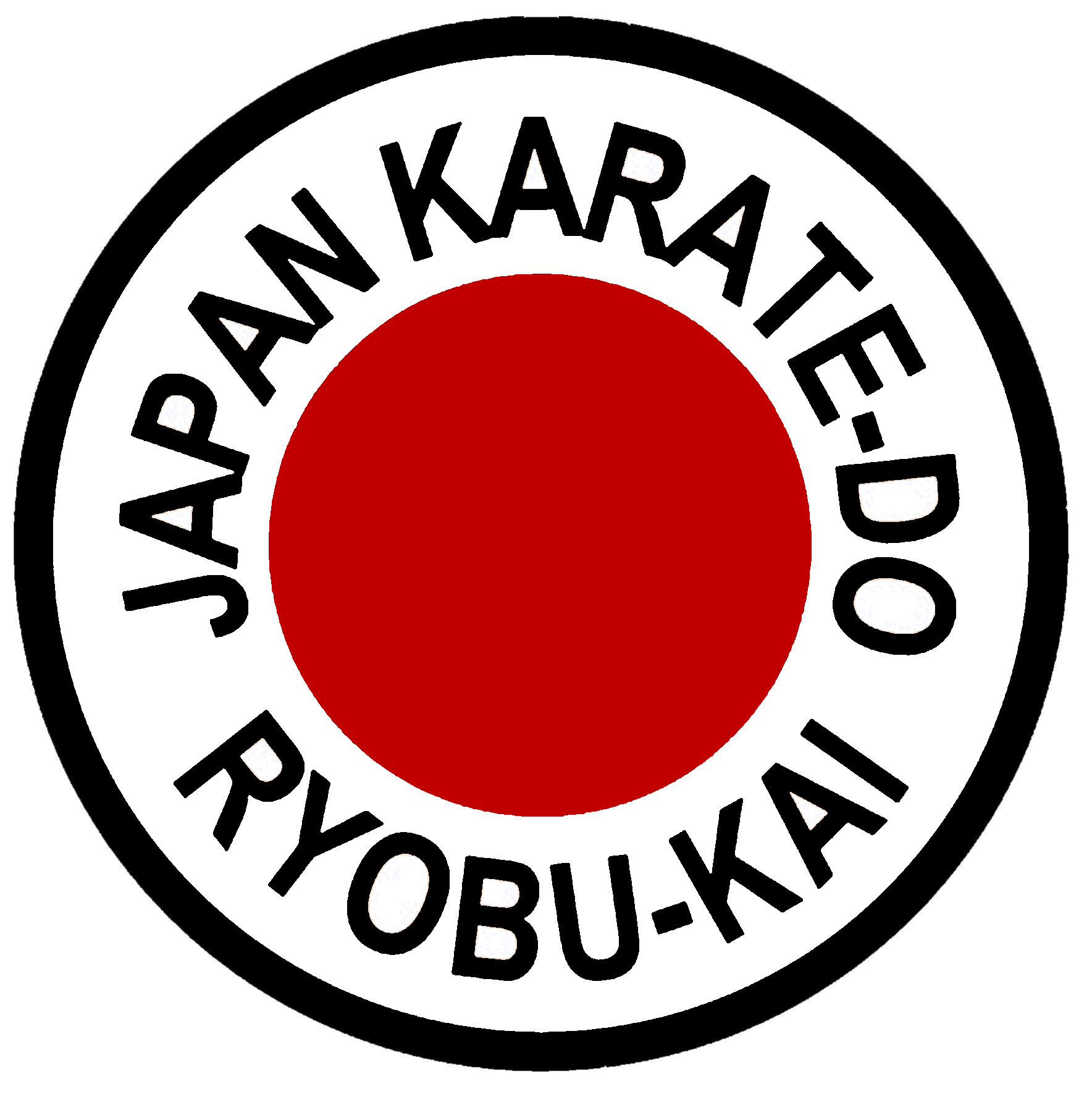
- Date founded: 1933
- Country of origin: Japan
- Founder: Yasuhiro Konishi (1893–1983)
- Current head: Yasuhiro (Takehiro) Konishi
- Arts taught: Karate
- Ancestor arts: Jujitsu
- Ancestor schools: Karate: Shotokan, Shitō-ryū, Motobu-ryu; Jiu-jitsu and Koryu: Takenouchi-ryū, Musō-ryū, Jikishinkage-ryū, Kyōshinmeichi-ryū, Ono-ha Ittō-ryū, Shindō Munen-ryū, Yōshin Koryū, Shiba Shin-Yo-ryu, Fusen-ryu, Yagyu Shingan-ryu.
- Practitioners: Sho Kosugi, Kiyoshi Yamazaki, Mina Yamazaki, Piston Horiguchi,
- Official website: Japan Karate-Do Ryobu-Kai

Shindo Jinen Ryu (神道自然流) is a form of karate that was founded in 1933 by Yasuhiro Konishi (康弘小西, Konishi Yasuhiro).

== The Naming of Shindo Jinen Ryu ==
Konishi believed that if one lives a moral life, then one is naturally following the divine way. Extending this idea, he posited that, if training in karate in a natural way leads one to mastery of one's body, knowledge and experience are vastly increased and the foundation for naturally living a moral life is established. For this reason Konishi named his own style Shindō jinen-ryū ("godly, natural style, complete empty-handed way").

== History and development ==
Prior to learning Karate, founder Yasuhiro Konishi had studied traditional Japanese martial arts at Takenouchi-ryū, Musō-ryū, Jikishinkage-ryū, Kyōshinmeichi-ryū, Ono-ha Ittō-ryū and Shindō Munen-ryū schools. In 1924, he began studying Karate under Gichin Funakoshi, and together with Hironori Otsuka (founder of Wado-ryu Karate), who was also a disciple of Funakoshi, whom with he would conceive practice of competitive Karate.

Subsequently, Konishi learned Karate from Motobu Choki and Kenwa Mabuni (founder of Shito-ryu Karate), and learned Aikido (then Daito-ryu Aikijujutsu) from Morihei Ueshiba. He would additionally learn Nanban Sattō-ryū Kenpō from Seiko Fujita, as well as go study Jiu-jitsu from Yōshin Koryū, Shiba Shin-Yo-ryu, Fusen-ryu, and Yagyu Shingan-ryu.

In 1933, he would compile all the techniques he had learned into Shindō jinen-ryū style. Konishi followed the path of karate and would teach that "Karate is based on the fact that no one hits you and no one hits you."

== Characteristics ==
Shindo Jinen Ryu training has three main elements: kihon (basics), kata (forms or patterns of moves) and kumite (sparring). It incorporates elements of karate, aikido, jujitsu and kendo in its curriculum and also emphasizes both philosophy and education. The strong influences of both Gichin Funakoshi and Kenwa Mabuni are apparent in the style. The catalog of stances and techniques is equally broad, subsuming methods from both Shotokan and Shito-Ryu. There is a strong focus on practicality and an approach that often combines entering strikes with finishing takedowns.

== Kata ==
Shindo Jinen Ryu has a large repertoire of kata, incorporating variations on the Shotokan catalog, a number of Shito-Ryu forms and a number of kata that are exclusive to Shindo Jinen Ryu. Kobudo is also part of this element of the style's curriculum.

Traditional Katas	Standard Katas	Kobudo	Additional Kata
Tai Sabaki Shodan	Heian Shodan	Suna Kake No Kon	Shisochin
Tai Sabaki Nidan	Heian Nidan	Shushi No Kon Dai	Saifa
Tai Sabaki Sandan	Heian Sandan	Shushi No Kon Sho	Kururunfa
Seiryu	Heian Yondan	Sakugawa No Kon	Tomari Bassai
Rohai	Heian Godan	Tozan No Kama	
Juroku	Tekki Shodan	Ishimine No Tonfa	
Naifanchin	Tekki Nidan	Hama Hi Ga No Tonfa	
Anan	Tekki Sandan	Ishimine No Sai	
Chatan Yara No Koshokun	Bassai Dai	Tsuken Shita Ha Ku No Sai	
Nipaipo	Bassai Sho	Hama Hi Ga No Sai	
Pinan Shodan	Kanku Dai	Tawa Ta No Sai	
Pinan Nidan	Kanku Sho	Chatan Yara No Sai	
Pinan Sandan	Empi	Ya Ka No Sai	
Pinan Yondan	Jitte/Jutte	Ha Ni Tagawa No Sai	
Pinan Godan	Jiin	Jigen No Sai	
Suparimpei	Jion	Kojo	
	Gankaku		
	Hangetsu		
	Nijushiho		
	Sochin		
	Chintei		
	Sanchin		
	Seipai		
	Unsu		
	Gojushiho Dai		
	Gojushiho Sho		
	Seienchin		

== Organization ==
Currently, Shindo Jinen-ryu has 15 branches in Japan and 15 overseas branches as the Japan Karatedo Ryobukai, and is active.

The Ryobukan Konishi Dojo of the Ryobukai General Headquarters was established by Yasuhiro Konishi, in 1927, before the founding of Shindo Jinen-Ryu. It has been used as a dojo for youth development before and after the war as a dojo for kendo, karate, and judo.

Following Yasuhiro Konishi's death on June 3, 1983, his eldest son, Takehiro Konishi, succeeded the second Soke.

In March 1985, the main dojo moved to KN Building at Shiba, Minato-ku, Tokyo. According to the "Monthly Karatedo" magazine specializing in karate, the Japanese domestic branches gather every year to hold the Ryobukan Tournament.

== Sources ==
- Japanese Karate, Volume 1: Shindo Jinen Ryu. [Motion Picture]. Thousand Oaks, CA: Tsunami Productions. 1998
- Japanese Karate, Volume 2: Ryobukai and Shotokan. [Motion Picture]. Thousand Oaks, CA: Tsunami Productions. 1998
- Japan Karate-Do Ryobu-Kai Instructors Manual. 1996
