= Yasunari Ishimi =

Japanese karate expert

- Born: 30 October 1943 (age 82); Hyogo near Osaka, Japan
- Occupation: Karate instructor
- Known for: 10th Dan of the World Karate Federation

Yasunari Ishimi (born 30 October 1943) is a Japanese karate expert who spent most of his career as an instructor in Spain. He is in the 10th Dan of the Spanish Karate Federation and the World Karate Federation.

== Early years ==
Yasunari Ishimi was born on 30 October 1943 in Hyogo near Osaka, Japan. In 1956 he began to practice Kushin-ryū style karate with master Matsukazi. In 1959 while at high school he began to practice Gōjū-ryū style karate. In 1960 he began to practice Shitō-ryū style karate with master Yoshiaki Tsuzikawa. Recommended by master Tsuzikawa, he began to also practice with master Mabuni Kenei, son of the founder of the Shito-Ryu school.

== University ==
Ishimi began his university studies in Kobe in 1961]. He earned the 1st Dan of the Japan Karate Federation. In 1962 he was captain of the Kobe University karate team, and was team champion of Kobe. He earned the 2nd Dan of the Japan Karate Federation. In 1965 he was Individual Second in the National University Championship. He obtained a degree in Philosophy and Letters from the Kobe Faculty of Foreign Languages. Ishimi earned the 3rd Dan of the Japan Karate Federation in 1967.

== Spain ==
Black Belt Times reported in December 1969 that Yasunari Ishimi, a student at Kobe University who wanted to become a novelist, had come to Spain to learn the language better, and was now the first Shito-style karate instructor in Spain. He taught in several Madrid gymnasiums. He returned to Japan in 1969 for the Japan Karate Federation examination for the 4th Dan. The Ishimi Dojo was opened in 1970, and he was given the 5th Dan of the Spanish Karate Federation. That year he founded the Spanish Shitō-ryū Association, and was national coach of the Spanish Karate Federation. Prince Adam Karol Czartoryski trained under Yasunari Ishimi. The future King Juan Carlos I of Spain practiced karate with great enthusiasm in the 1970s, with Prince Adan Czartoryski and the masters Yosuke Yamasbita and Yasunari Ishimi.

Ishimi returned to Japan in 1973 for the Japan Karate Federation examination for the 5th Dan. In 1979 he earned the 6th Dan of the Japan Karate Federation and the 6th Dan of the Spanish Karate Federation. In 1980 at the World Karate Championship (WUKO) in Madrid Ishimi passed his World Kata Judge examination brilliantly. In 1983 he became an international judge and World Kumite Judge, and was raised to the 7th Dan of the Spanish Karate federation. On 20 December 1983 he founded the European Shitō-kai Association, and became its technical director. He earned the 7th Dan of the Japan Karate Federation in 1985, and was awarded the title of Master of Shitō-ryū by Master Mabuni Kenei. In 1988 Master Manzo Iwata, President of the Shitō-kai school, named him European representative of this school.

Ishimi was raised to the Spanish Karate Federation's 8th Dan in June 1995, and to its 9th Dan in July 2005. In 2010 Infanta Cristina of Spain awarded him the Medal of Merit for Sports. Master Ishimi regularly provides seminars to members of Shitokai Europe in France, Switzerland, Belgium and Portugal. As of 2020 he was living in Madrid and continued to teach and practice Karate Do in his Dojo. The Ishimi gym on Calle Alonso Cano is 350 square metres (3,800 sq ft). It also gives other types of gym training with music for cardiovascular development and muscle toning using modern equipment and computer-based teaching methods.

== Philosophy ==
Yasunari Ishimi teaches a form of karate closer to its original values as opposed to the purely competitive spirit often found in modern karate. He says that the old masters learned to move by observing nature. The wind teaches us to breathe, the trees, to stay firm, the bamboo, to be flexible. Many techniques are based on qualities of wild animals: the strength of the tiger, the speed of the snake or the elegance of the crane. The practice of these techniques, somehow, returns us to contact with nature from deep inside. He explains that karate is believed to be a martial art and is mostly seen as fighting, but in its practice it involves the whole body: the breath, the mind ... As with other disciplines of Zen philosophy such as yoga and taichi, you feel a whole internal energy. It serves as a defense technique, but also to improve your health.

== Kata ==
Yasunari Ishimi created his own Kata Chanan Dai, which is an assembly of the five Pinan kata. He introduced this kata in his summer Gushakku in Murcia 2022.

== Sources ==
- Barrero, Joaquin M. (8 May 2013), Una mañana de marzo (Serie Corazón Rodríguez) (in Spanish), Penguin Random House Grupo Editorial España, ISBN 978-84-666-5005-2
- Hueso, Katia (2 October 2017), Somos Naturaleza: Un viaje a nuestra esencia (in Spanish), Plataforma, ISBN 978-84-17002-98-5
- "Ishimi", Welcome to Madrid
- Martínez-Fornés, Almudena (6 May 2015), "Don Juan Carlos se reencuentra con sus maestros de karate, pioneros en España", Diario ABC (in Spanish)
- Núñez, A. (11 June 2015), "Nueva escuela de kárate en Boadilla", Solo Boadilla (in Spanish)
- Shitokai Ishimi, "Yasunari Ishimi", shuriway
- "Shitokai Sensei Yasunari Ishimi - Kyoshi", Budokai Mandeure (in French), archived from the original on 2018-09-16
- Smith, G. M. (December 1969), "Two New Karate Instructors Adding Incentive to Madris Dojos", Black Belt Times, Active Interest Media, Inc., ISSN 0277-3066
- "Yasunari Ishimi Sensei" (PDF), Karate Club Shitokai (in French)
