= Mabuni Kenei =

Okinawan karateka

- Born: February 13, 1918; Shuri, Okinawa
- Died: December 19, 2015 (aged 97)
- Style: Shitō-ryū
- Teachers: Mabuni Kenwa, Konishi Yasuhiro, Fujita Seiko
- Rank: 2nd Sōke, Official head of Shitō-ryū

Mabuni Kenei (摩文仁 賢榮, Kenei Mabuni; February 13, 1918 – December 19, 2015) was a Japanese martial arts expert, holder of the 10th Dan.

== Personal history ==
Kenei Mabuni was born in Shuri, Okinawa. As the son of Kenwa Mabuni, the founder of the Shitō-ryū and one of the most important karate experts in the history of the martial arts, he was in touch with karate and some of its greatest masters such as Miyagi Chojun, Funakoshi Gichin, and Motobu Chōki from childhood. Besides his karate practice he also studied several other martial arts such as aikidō, kendō, Okinawan kobudō, jujutsu, jûdô, and ninjutsu. At the age of 34 he became the head of Shitō-ryū.

In particular, Mabuni Kenei emphasized the importance of the spiritual contents and values of karatedō. Without generally refusing sport-oriented karate he supported a clear distinction between traditional karatedō and sport karate.

Among his achievements is the completion of the kata Shimpā that his father had created but not completed. This kata was inspired by the Uechi-ryū. He was the author of several books about the Shitō-ryū techniques and of one book about the historical roots and the spiritual basics of karate as budō art. On December 19, 2015, he died at the age of 97.

Kenei Mabuni was succeeded by his son, Kenyu Mabuni, as the third Soke of Shito-Ryu. Kenyu was anointed the next Soke (successor) of the system in an inauguration ceremony held on February 28, 2016, in Osaka, continuing his father's and his grandfather's work which is the spread of the original Shito ryu Karate do worldwide.

== Publications ==
- Mabuni, Kenei (2009). Empty Hand: The Essence of Budō Karate. Edited by Carlos Molina. Chemnitz: Palisander Verlag. ISBN 978-3-938305-13-3.
- Mabuni, Kenei (1997). Shito-Ryu Karate-Do: The Essence of Budō Karate. Assisted by Con Kassis. Victoria, Australia: Dominie Press.
