= JKR =

JKR or Jkr. may refer to:

- Janakpur Airport (IATA code: JKR), an airport in southeastern Nepal
- Japan Karate-Do Ryobu-Kai, an international karate organization
- J. K. Rowling, author of the Harry Potter series
- Johnson-Kendall-Roberts model, a mathematical model in contact mechanics
- Jones Knowles Ritchie, a British design agency
- Junker (Jkr.), a German noble honorific
- Malaysian Public Works Department (Malay: Jabatan Kerja Raya), a federal department in Malaysia for public infrastructure
- Public Work Department (Brunei)
