= Unsū =

Karate technique

Unsu (雲手, lit. 'cloud hands'), is the most advanced kata found in the Shotokan, Shito-Ryu and Wado-Ryu karate styles and is generally taught to karateka at the 3rd to 4th Dan. It contains many intricate hand techniques, such as the ippon-nukite (one finger strike) in the opening sequence. Unsu also contains a 360-degree spinning double-kick with a double-leg take down at the same time, landing on the floor face-down before continuing. Because of this, it is a very common kata in tournaments and seen as method of testing the competitors knowledge, spirit and skill.

Per Bruce Clayton in his book, Shotokan's Secret, Unsu was created by Seisho Arakaki sometime around 1860-1870. Arakaki was a Japanese and Chinese language interpreter to the Shuri court, and a master of monk fist and white crane styles. It is somewhat a condensation of other katas (e.g., Bassai, Kanku, Jion, Empi, Jitte and Gankaku), hence it is essential to have mastered these before practicing Unsu.

The movement, Unsu, or hands in the cloud, is used to sweep away the hands of the opponent and is said to signify the gathering clouds in a thunderstorm.

Masatoshi Nakayama suggests in the Best Karate volume containing Unsu, that the name derives from the constant transformations, expansions, contractions, shifting, etc. of the body as the Kata is performed, just as clouds constantly change and transform. It consists of 48 moves.

== See also ==
- Bunkai
- Kata
- Shotokan
