= Rōhai =

Karate kata, breaking a board or brick

- Other names: Meikyo, Lo Hai
- Martial art: Shorin-ryu, Shotokan, Shotokai, Shito-ryu, Shukokai, Shindo Jinen-ryu, Gensei-ryu, Matsubayashi-ryu, Wado-ryu, Tang Soo Do and Soo Bahk Do

Rōhai (鷺牌) meaning “image of a heron” or “sign of a heron” is a family of kata practiced in some styles of karate.

== Origin ==
The kata originated from the Tomari-te school of Okinawan martial arts. It was called Matsumora Rōhai, after Kosaku Matsumora, who was presumably its inventor (not to be confused with Sokon Matsumura). Ankō Itosu later took this kata and developed three kata from it: Rōhai shodan, Rōhai nidan, and Rōhai sandan. In Shorin-ryū and Matsubayashi-ryū this kata introduces Gedan Shotei Ate (Lower/Downward Palm Heel Smash) and Ippon Ashi Dachi. (One Leg Stance) It contains a sequence of Tomoe Zuki (Circular Punch) exactly the same as the one in Bassai, although the ending of the sequence chains into Hangetsu Geri/Uke (Half Moon Kick/Block).

== Schools and variations ==
Shito-ryu teaches all three of the Itosu Rohai kata as well as Matsumora Rohai. Some styles such as Wadō-ryū employ only one of Itosu’s kata (Rōhai shodan or just Rōhai). While other styles such as Genseiryū and Shindō_jinen-ryū only teach Matsumora Rohai.

The Shotokan version of Rōhai (renamed Meikyo (明鏡), literally "bright mirror" by Gichin Funakoshi) is very distinct from either the Matsumora or Itosu versions. It is believed that Funakoshi being a much older and earlier student of Itosu than Kenwa Mabuni may have been taught a different version of Rohai from Itosu known as Gusukuma Rohai. Sometime in the early 1990s Tetsuhiko Asai introduced two new kata of his own design: Meikyo nidan and Meikyo sandan.

In Tang Soo Do and Soo Bahk Do unlike most of its forms which can be traced back to Shotokan, their version of Rohai was based on the Matsumora version. Over the years practitioners have made numerous changes to the form including the addition of a board (or brick) breaking element, which can be performed using either a downward punch or palm strike.

== See also ==
- Karate kata
