= Taikyoku =

Karate kata

The Taikyoku series is a series of kata in use in several types of karate. The name Taikyoku (太極) refers to the Chinese philosophical concept of Taiji. The Taikyoku kata were developed by Yoshitaka Funakoshi and introduced by Gichin Funakoshi as a way to simplify the principles of the already simplified Pinan/Heian series. The embusen, or pattern of the kata's movements, are the same as in Heian shodan. Students of karate systems that use the Taikyoku kata series are often introduced to them first, as a preparation for the Pinan/Heian kata. Some Korean Tang Soo Do and Song Moo Kwan Taekwondo schools, also practice these kata (poomsae); they are termed, "Taegeuk", which is a direct Korean translation of the Kanji/Hanja characters used to write "Taikyoku". They are distinctly different from the 8 Taegeuk poomsae practiced in Kukkiwon. Gōjū Kai developed five of its own Taikyoku kata, based on the Shotokan katas and retaining the I-shaped embusen. The embusen (pathway) of all the Taikyoku kata is simple (here, the # represents the starting and ending point):

               *--!  
               |
               |
               |
               |
            !--#

On each turn, a block is executed, followed by a step and a strike. Up and back the middle, then there are three punches.

== Shotokan ==
=== Taikyoku ===
Gichin "Shoto" Funakoshi Sensei named the set of three Taikyoku kata developed by his son Yoshitaka “Gigō” Funakoshi Sensei.

=== Taikyoku Shodan ===
Taikyoku Shodan, often simply referred to as "Kihon" is the first of the series, and involves only two basic moves: the gedan barai or low block, and chudan (middle) oi zuki (sometimes "oi tsuki"), or lunge punch. All stances, except at the beginning and end, are zenkutsu dachi (forward stance). There are 20 steps to this kata and all turns are inwards to the embusen.

=== Taikyoku Nidan ===
The second kata of the series, Taikyoku Nidan, is similar to Taikyoku Shodan, except that the chudan punches are all replaced with upper-level (jodan) punches.

=== Taikyoku Sandan ===
The third kata of the series, Taikyoku Sandan, is similar to Taikyoku Shodan, except that moves 1, 3, 9, 11, 17 and 19 are replaced with middle level arm blocks (uchi uke) executed in back (kokutsu) stance.

=== Taikyoku Yondan ===
Practically the same as Taikyoku Shodan except after moves 1, 3, 9, 11, 17 and 19 a mae-geri is executed

=== Taikyoku Godan ===
This is quite different from Taikyoku Shodan as after moves 1, 3, 9, 11, 17 and 19 instead of striking chudan the moves executed are age uke and then reverse punch and on moves 5 and 13 after the gedan-barai a mae-geri is executed before each strike.

=== Taikyoku Rokudan ===
The final of the taikyoku series is also the most different of the previous five as each move is a gedan barai in kiba dachi (horse riding stance).

== Shitō-ryū ==
=== Juni No Kata ===
Juni No Kata (十二の型, twelve attack step kata) is the version of Taikyoku taught in Shitō-ryū. It follows the same embusen as the Shotokan Taikyoku, and has the same 20 separate 'moves' with the block/punch combinations as 1 count each resulting in a 12 count kata. Typically, three version of this kata are taught: Juni No Ichi, Juni No Ni, and Juni No San. Juni No Ichi includes gedan-barai (low block) in zenkutsu-dachi (forward stance) and oi-zuku (lunge punch) in moto-dachi (high stance), Juni No Ni replaces low blocks with middle blocks, and Juni No San - with high blocks in neko ashi dachi (cat stance).

== Gōjū Kai ==
These kata are performed largely the same, changing the stances and strikes to teach students the basics of moving and striking before moving on to more difficult kata.

The first in the series is taikyoku gedan. It employs the same strikes and blocks as Shotokan's taikyoku shodan, but employs the shiko dachi ("straddle-leg stance", similar to the "horse stance") in half facing position (hanmi) instead of the front stance. The second in the series, taikyoku chudan, alternates between front stance and sanchin dachi ("hourglass stance") and the low blocks have been replaced with soto uke (outer mid-level block). The third kata, taikyoku jodan, is identical to chudan but replaces the soto uke with jodan age uke (high block). The fourth, taikyoku tora guchi, is named after the trapping technique/block it teaches: the double handed hooking block, tora guchi. The fifth, taikyoku kake uke is exactly the same as taikyoku tora guchi, but teaches the hook block, kake uke.

== Go-Kan-Ryu ==
=== Taigyoku Shodan (GKR spelling) ===
Almost identical to Shotokan's Taikyoku Shodan except that a look over the left shoulder is performed with moves 3, 11 and 19 where the right foot is moved back (behind) for the 180 degree (about face) turns. The GKR open and close ceremonies are also different from Shotokan's, notably the use of parallel ready stance (heiko dachi) instead of open V stance (soto hachiji dachi).

=== Taigyoku Nidan ===
Based on Taigyoku Shodan with simple punch/kick and kick/punch combinations replacing some single technique counts. Moves 2, 4, 10, 12, 18 and 20 are an in-place chudan gyaku-zuki then moving forward with a chudan mae-geri keage. Moves 6, 7, 8 and 14, 15, 16 are (a moving forward) chudan mae-geri keage and landing with a chudan oi-zuki. The look over the left shoulder is not performed in Taigyoku Nidan.

== Kyokushin ==
=== Taikyoku sono ichi ===
Taikyoku sono ichi is first kata in the series. On every turn, a gedan barai is executed. Every punch is seiken oi tsuki chudan. It is in effect identical to the Taikyoku Shodan as done in shotokan.

=== Taikyoku sono ni ===
The second kata in the series. It is performed the same way as taikyoku sono ichi, except that all punches are jodan instead of chudan. It is in effect identical to the Taikyoku nidan as done in shotokan.

=== Taikyoku sono san ===
The third kata in the series. All movements are the same as Taikyoku Sandan with the strikes on moves 6,7,8,14,15, and 16 being performed at high level (jodan-zuki).

=== Sokugi taikyoku sono ichi ===
The first sokugi (kicking) kata in the series. On every turn, kansetsu geri (yoko geri gedan) is executed, while on the following step or the three steps over the middle, mae geri keage is executed. In some schools, a kake wake uke is performed between the kansetsu geri and the mae geri keage.

=== Sokugi taikyoku sono ni ===
The second sokugi (kicking) kata in the series. Instead of kansetsu geri being executed on every turn, yoko geri is executed, which is the same technique but going to chudan or jodan instead of gedan. On each step and the three steps over the middle, mae geri is executed. Again, in some schools, a kake wake uke is performed between the yoko geri and the mae geri.

=== Sokugi taikyoku sono san ===
The third sokugi (kicking) kata in the series. On each turn, a yoko geri is executed. The following steps on the short sides are haisoku mawashi uchi keage, while the three kicks executed over the long side are teisoku mawashi soto keage. In some interpretations, an ura mawashi geri is performed instead of an haisoku mawashi uchi keage, and a mawashi geri instead of a teisoku mawashi soto keage, and a kake wake uke is performed between the yoko geri and the following keage.

=== Ura ===
The taikyoku series can also be done "in Ura" denoting that each step is reversed, meaning that every other step one steps in circle to reach the target, then performs the technique. The round steps are always performed on the strikes, not the blocks

=== Tate ===
The series can also be performed "in Tate" a variation invented by Yoshikazu Matsushima and unique to IKO3. In this variation the steps are performed in a straight line, starting by stepping directly forward, then the turns being 180 degrees rather than ninety. On the last step, one turns to where one was originally facing rather than stepping forward.

== Shuri-ryū ==
In Shuri-ryū, Taikyoku Ichi is performed at gedan level, Taikyoku Ni is performed at chudan level, and Taikyoku San is performed at jodan level. All performed in the typical "H" or "I" pattern.

== Korean martial arts ==
Korean schools of Tang Soo Do and Tae Kwon Do began teaching the Taikyoku Kata under the name Kicho Hyung. The embusen used are the same, the stances and blocks are similar, and the strikes are virtually identical. A common symbol used in Korean arts for the Kicho Hyung is a human baby learning to walk.

== See also ==
- Karate kata
