= Shogo =

Shōgo
- Gender: Male

Origin
- Origin: Japanese
- Meaning: Different meanings depending on the kanji used

Shogo, Shōgo, Shohgo or Shougo (written: 正吾, 正悟, 正五, 省吾, 昭吾, 翔吾, 翔悟, 章吾, 昇吾, 昇悟, 勝吾, 鐘吾, 奨悟, 将吾, 彰吾, 笙吾, 渉瑚 or 祥吾) is a masculine Japanese given name. Notable people with the name include:

- Shogo Akada (赤田 将吾; born 1980), Japanese baseball player
- Shogo Akiyama (秋山 翔吾; born 1988), Japanese professional baseball player
- Shōgo Arai (荒井 正吾; born 1945), Japanese politician
- Shogo Asayama (朝山 正悟; born 1981), Japanese basketball player and coach
- Daishōmaru Shōgo (大翔丸 翔伍; born 1991), Japanese sumo wrestler
- Shogo Fujimaki (藤牧 祥吾; born 1989), Japanese footballer
- Shogo Fukuda (福田 将吾; born 1984), Japanese basketball player and coach
- Shōgo Hamada (浜田 省吾; born 1952), Japanese singer-songwriter
- Shogo Kamo (加茂 正五; 1915–1977), Japanese footballer
- Shogo Kimura (木村 昇吾; born 1980), Japanese baseball player and cricketer
- Shogo Kobara (小原 章吾; born 1982), Japanese footballer
- Shogo Koumoto (河本 昇悟), Japanese anime director
- Shogo Mukai (向井 昭吾; born 1961), Japanese rugby union player and coach
- Shogo Nakahara (中原 彰吾; born 1994), Japanese footballer
- Shogo Nakamura (baseball) (中村 奨吾; born 1992), Japanese baseball player
- Shogo Nakano (中野 翔吾; born 1997), Japanese rugby union player
- Shogo Nishida (西田 祥吾; born 1982), Japanese fencer
- Shogo Nishikawa (西河 翔吾; born 1983), Japanese footballer
- Shogo Nonomura (野々村 笙吾; born 1993), Japanese artistic gymnast
- Shogo Sakai (坂井 将吾; born 1988), Japanese footballer
- Shōgo Sakamoto (阪本 奨悟; born 1993), Japanese actor
- Shogo Sakurai (桜井 鐘吾; born 1984), Japanese footballer
- Shōgo Shimada (actor) (島田 正吾; 1905–2004), Japanese actor
- Shōgo Shimada (footballer) (嶋田 正吾; born 1979), Japanese footballer
- Shogo Shiozawa (塩沢 勝吾; born 1982), Japanese footballer
- Shōgo Suzuki (鈴木 省吾; born 1963), Japanese actor and narrator
- Shogo Suzuki (actor) (鈴木 勝吾; born 1989), Japanese actor
- Shogo Takeda (竹田 渉瑚; born 1995), Japanese swimmer
- Shogo Tokihisa (時久 省吾; born 1984), Japanese footballer
- Shōgo Tomiyama (富山 省吾; born 1952), Japanese film producer and screenwriter
- Shogo Yamaguchi (山口 翔悟; born 1983), Japanese actor
- Shogo Yamamoto (山本 省吾; born 1978), Japanese baseball player
- Shogo Yoshikawa (吉川 翔梧; born 1995), Japanese footballer

Shōgō, Shougou or Shohgoh (written: 将豪, 昇剛 or 章剛) is a separate given name, though it may be romanized the same way. Notable people with the name include:

- Shōgō Kuniba (国場 将豪; 1935–1992), Japanese karateka
- Shōgō Yasumura (安村 昇剛; better known by his new stage name Tonikaku Akarui Yasumura, born 1982), Japanese comedian

== Fictional characters ==
- Shogo Kawada, a character in the novel, manga, and film Battle Royale
- Shogo Makishima, a character in the anime series Psycho-Pass
- Shogo Taguchi, a minor antagonist in the anime series That Time I Got Reincarnated as a Slime
- Shogo Akuji, a minor antagonist in Saints Row 2
- Shogo Haizaki, a character in the manga series Kuroko's Basketball

== See also ==
- Shogo (musician)
- Shogo: Mobile Armor Division
