= Kūsankū (kata) =

Open hand karate kata

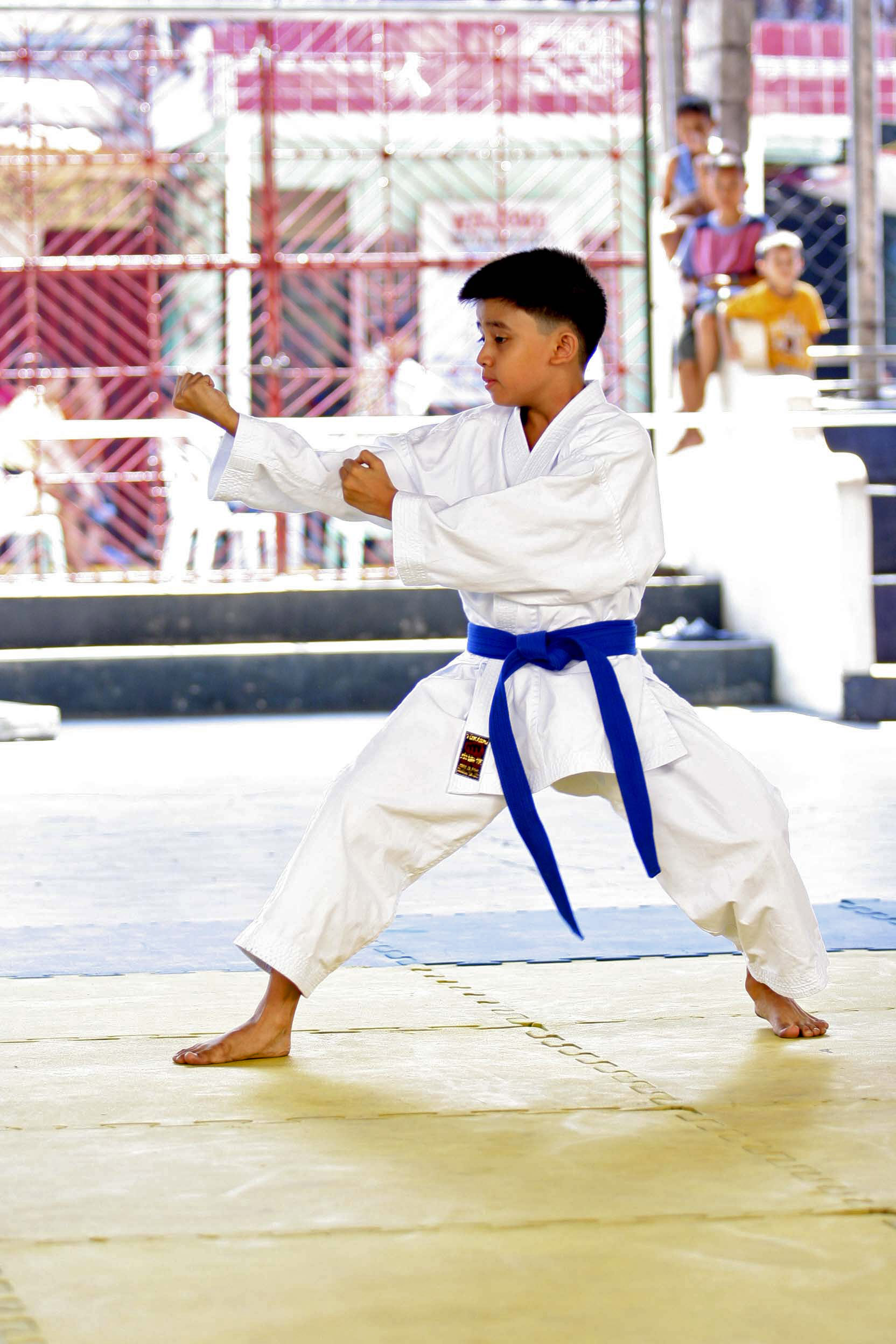
- Young karateka performs Kūsankū-shō
- Other names: Kushanku, Kōshōkun, Kankū
- Martial art: Karate, Tang Soo Do, and Tae Kwon Do
- Place of origin: Okinawa, Ryukyu Kingdom
- Creator: unknown

Kūsankū (クーサンクー) is a kata of karate and is practiced mainly in the Shuri-te lineage. It is also called Kūshankū (クーシャンクー), Kōshōkun (公相君) or Kankū (観空).

Variations of Kūsankū include Dai and Shō, which have been known since the early 20th century, but today differ from school-to-school. Additionally variations exist, such as Chatan Yara Kūshankū. There is a theory that Kūsankū originated with Kōshōkun (Okinawan dialect: Kūsankū), who visited Okinawa during the Ryukyu Kingdom in the mid-18th century, but no primary historical evidence has been found to substantiate this theory.

In Shotokan, the kata has been known as Kankū (観空, lit. 'gazing at the sky') ever since it was renamed in 1935 by Funakoshi Gichin. This kata is also practiced in Tang Soo Do as Kong Sang Koon (공상군) in Korean according to the hangul rendering of the hanja 公相君. Most schools of Tang Soo Do only practice the "Dai" version but a handful do practice both the latter and "Shō" versions.

== Overview ==
Kūsankū is a cornerstone of many styles of karate. It is characterized by the use of flowing techniques that resemble those found in White Crane Kung Fu. It also has a wide variety of open-handed techniques. In Matsubayashi-ryu karate, the kata is known for its flying kick and its "cheating" stance, which robs the opponent of opportunities to attack by extending one leg along the ground and squatting as low as possible on the other (ura-gamae). One possible bunkai for this technique allows the practitioner to escape a bear hug from behind by twisting and dropping out of their grasp. The hand techniques that accompany the stance block the head, while allowing for a strike to the groin, knee, or foot. Because of the complexity of its techniques, Kūsankū is the highest ranking and most complex kata in Matsubayashi-ryū, and is said to take more than ten years to master.

In Shotokan, Kankū-dai consists of 65 movements executed in about 90 seconds. It is a major form of the kata; its equivalent minor form is called Kankū-shō. Kankū-dai was one of Gichin Funakoshi's favorite kata and is a representative kata of the Shōtōkan system. The embusen (path of movement) of Kankū-shō is similar to that of Kankū-dai, but it begins differently. It is a compulsory Shōtōkan kata and of high technical merit. As a result of Anko Itosu's efforts, the Heian kata contain sequences taken from Kankū-dai.

== See also ==
- Kusanku Sai in Isshin-ryū
- Karate kata
- Kata
