= Shitō-ryū =

Form of karate

Shitō-ryū (糸東流)
- Date founded: 1934
- Country of origin: Japan
- Founder: Kenwa Mabuni (1889–1952)
- Current head: Mabuni Kenyu
- Arts taught: Karate
- Ancestor arts: Shuri-te, Naha-te, and Go-Kenki influence
- Descendant arts: Shitō-kai • Shūkōkai • Kuniba-kai • Itosu-kai • Kenwa-Kai • Genbu-kai
- Ancestor schools: Shuri-te and Naha-te

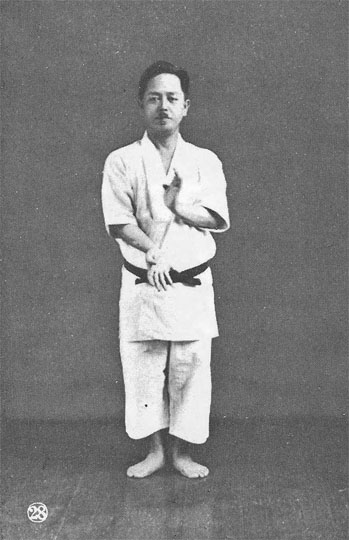
Kenwa Mabuni, the founder of Shitō-ryū Karate, doing a movement

Shitō-ryū (糸東流) is a form of karate that was founded in 1934 by Kenwa Mabuni (摩文仁 賢和, Mabuni Kenwa). Shitō-ryū is synthesis of the Okinawan Shuri-te and Naha-te schools of karate and today is considered one of the four main styles of the art.

== History ==
Kenwa Mabuni (Mabuni Kenwa 摩文仁 賢和) was born in Shuri, Okinawa in 1889. Mabuni was a 17th generation descendant of the warrior Uni Ufugusuku Kenyu. He began his instruction in his home town in the art of Shuri-te (首里手) at the age of 13, under the tutelage of Ankō Itosu (糸州 安恒, Itosu Ankō) (1831–1915). He trained diligently for several years, learning many kata. It was Itosu who first developed the Pinan kata, which were possibly derived from the Kusanku form.

One of his close friends, Chōjun Miyagi (宮城 長順, Miyagi Chōjun) (founder of Gojū-ryū Karate) introduced Mabuni to another great of that period, Kanryō Higaonna (東恩納 寛量, Higaonna Kanryō). Mabuni began to learn Naha-te (那覇手) under him. While both Itosu and Higaonna taught a "hard-soft" style of Okinawan "Te", their methods and emphases were quite distinct: the Itosu syllabus included straight and powerful techniques as exemplified in the Naihanchi and Bassai kata; the Higaonna syllabus stressed circular motion and shorter fighting methods as seen in the kata Seipai and Kururunfa. Shitō-ryū focuses on both hard and soft techniques.

Although he remained true to the teachings of these two masters, Mabuni sought instruction from a number of other teachers, including Seishō Arakaki, Tawada Shimboku, Sueyoshi Jino and Wu Xiangui (a Chinese white crane kung fu master known as Go-Kenki in Japanese). In fact, Mabuni was legendary for his encyclopaedic knowledge of kata and their bunkai applications. By the 1920s, he was regarded as the foremost authority on Okinawan kata and their history and was much sought after as a teacher by his contemporaries. There is even some evidence that his expertise was sought out in China, as well as in Okinawa and mainland Japan. As a police officer, he taught local law enforcement officers and at the behest of his teacher Itosu, began instruction in the various grammar schools in Shuri and Naha.

In an effort to popularize karate in mainland Japan, Mabuni made several trips to Tokyo in 1917 and 1928. Although much that was known as Te (lit. "hand") or karate had been passed down through many generations with jealous secrecy, it was his view that it should be taught to anyone who sought knowledge with honesty and integrity. In fact, many masters of his generation held similar views on the future of Karate: Gichin Funakoshi (founder of Shotokan), another contemporary, had moved to Tokyo in the 1920s to promote his art on the mainland as well.

By 1929, Mabuni had moved to Osaka on the mainland, to become a full-time karate instructor of a style he originally called Hanko-ryū, or "half-hard style". The name of the style changed to Shitō-ryū, in honor of its main influences. Mabuni derived the name for his new style from the first kanji character from the names of his two primary teachers, Itosu and Higaonna (also called Higashionna). With the support of Ryusho Sakagami (1915–1993), he opened a number of Shitō-ryū dojo in the Osaka area, including one at Kansai University and the Japan Karatedō-kai dojo. To this day, the largest contingent of Shitō-ryū practitioners in Japan is centered in the Osaka area.

Mabuni published a number of books on the subject and continued to systematize his instruction method. In his latter years, he developed a number of formal kata, such as Aoyagi, for example, which was designed specifically for women's self-defense. To this day, Shitō-ryū recognizes the influences of Itosu and Higaonna: the kata syllabus of Shitō-ryū is still often listed in such a way as to show the two lineages.

== Succession ==
Kenwa Mabuni died on May 23, 1952, and the lineage of the style was disputed between his two sons, Kenzo (1927-2005) and Kenei (1918–2015). Currently, the Shitō-ryū International Karate-dō Kai (also known as Seito Shitō-ryū) lists Kenzō Mabuni as the second Sōke of Shitō-ryū, while the World Shitō-ryū Karate-dō Federation (also known as Shitō-kai Shitō-ryū) lists Kenei Mabuni. According to Japanese tradition, the eldest son is deemed the successor and inheritor of everything his father owned, including the title of Soke. Kenei Mabuni was succeeded by his son, Kenyu Mabuni, as the third Soke of Shito-Ryu. Kenyu was anointed the next Soke (successor) of the system in an inauguration ceremony held on February 28, 2016, in Osaka, continuing his father's and his grandfather's work which is the spread of the original Shito ryu Karate do worldwide. Additionally, Tsukasa Mabuni, daughter of Kenzo Mabuni, is the 3rd Soke of Seito Shito Ryu, inheriting the title from her father. Her organization is Shito Ryu International Karate Do Kai.

== Characteristics ==
Shitō-ryū is a combination style, which attempts to unite the diverse roots of karate. On one hand, Shitō-ryū has the physical strength and long powerful stances of Shuri-te derived styles, such as Shorin-ryū and Shotokan (松涛館); on the other hand, Shitō-ryū also has the circular and eight-directional movements, breathing power, and hard and soft characteristics of Naha-te styles such as Uechi-ryū and Gōjū-ryū (剛柔流). Shitō-ryū is extremely fast, but still can be artistic and powerful. In addition, Shitō-ryū formalizes and emphasizes the five rules of defense, developed by Kenwa Mabuni, and known as Uke no go gensoku (受けの五原則), Uke no go genri (受けの五原理), or Uke no go ho (受けの五法):

- 落花 (rakka, "falling petals"). The art of blocking with such force and precision as to completely destroy the opponent's attacking motion. Examples of rakka are the most well-known blocks, such as gedan-barai (下段払い) or soto-uke (外受け).
- 流水 (ryūsui, "running water"). The art of flowing around the attacker's motion, and through it, soft blocking. Examples are nagashi-uke (流し受け) and osae-uke (押さえ受け).
- 屈伸 (kusshin, "elasticity"). This is the art of bouncing back, storing energy while recoiling from the opponent's attack, changing or lowering stance only to immediately unwind and counterattack. Classic examples are stance transitions zenkutsu (前屈立ち) to kōkutsu (後屈立ち) and moto-dachi (基立ち) to nekoashi-dachi (猫足立ち).
- 転位 (ten'i, "transposition"). Ten'i is the utilization of all eight directions of movement, most importantly stepping away from the line of attack.
- 反撃 (hangeki, "counterattack"). A hangeki defense is an attack which at the same time deflects the opponent's attack before it can reach the defender. Examples of this are various kinds of tsuki-uke (突き受け), including yama-tsuki (山突き).

Modern Shitō-ryū styles also place a strong emphasis on sparring. Shitō-ryū stresses speed and economy of movement, and fighting is generally initiated from a higher, more upright stance than Shotokan employs. On the other hand, because the style has a relatively high number of kata, significant time is spent perfecting forms.

== Style branches ==
Many derivative styles of Shitō-ryū developed after the death of Kenwa Mabuni. Notable branches started by his sons and students are:

- Sons

- Shitō-kai Shitō-ryū: created by Mabuni Kenei and Manzo Iwata, currently represented by World Shitō-ryū Karate-dō Federation
- Seitō Shitō-ryū: created by Kenzo Mabuni, currently represented by Shitō-ryū International Karate-dō Kai

- Students

- Tani-Ha Shitō-ryū: created by Chōjirō Tani, a student of Kenwa Mabuni. This style is also known as Shūkōkai
- Motobu-ha Shito-Ryu was created by Shōgō Kuniba, a student of Kenwa Mabuni. This style is also known as Seishinkai
- Japan Karatedo Shobukan was created by Kyoshin Kayo, a student of Kenwa Mabuni. This style is known as Shito-ryu Shobukan
- Japan Karatedo Nobukawa-ha Shito-Ryu Kai. style founded by Kuniaki Nobukawa.
- Itosu-ryu: created by Ryusho Sakagami, a student of Kenwa Mabuni, currently represented by Itosu-ryu Karatedo International Federation
- Ogasahara-ha Shitō-ryū, created by Eiji Ogasahara, a student of Kenwa Mabuni. This style is also known as Kenshukai
- Japan Karatedo Shito-Ryu International Renshikan founded by Kyoshi Naresh Sharma

== Techniques ==
List of techniques, used in the Shitō-ryū style of karate. Blocks, kicks and strikes can be jōdan, chūdan or gedan and related to migi (right) or hidari (left).

=== Tachi (stances) ===
- Heisoku dachi: Toes & heels together, (closed foot stance), at "attention".
- Musubi dachi: Heels together, & toes apart, (open foot stance) "knot" shape.
- Heiko dachi: Feet apart, parallel (open, hip width).
- Hachiji dachi: Feet apart, toes pointing OUT at 45 degrees (open, shoulder width).
- Uchi-Hachiji dachi (Naifanchi Dachi): Feet apart, toes pointing IN at 45 degrees (open, shoulder width).
- Shiko dachi: Straddle leg, "Sumo" stance.
- Moto dachi: Front knee partially bent, forward stance (shorter than Zenkutsu dachi).
- Han-Zenkutsu Dachi : Little Bigger than moto dachi and shorter than Zenkutsu Dachi.
- Heiko Sanchin Dachi : Little longer than Sanchin Dachi
- Soei Ashi Dachi : Front Leg bend with back leg heel raise. Reverse of Neko Ashi Dachi
- Zawan Dachi : Wider than Kosa Dachi
- Zenkutsu dachi: Front knee bent, long forward stance.
- Nekoashi dachi: "Cat foot" stance.
- Sanchin dachi: Inward tension stance. ("Hour glass" stance.)
- Kōkutsu dachi: "Looking back" stance. ("Back stance".)
- Renoji dachi: Stance resembling the letter "L".
- "Tee"-ji dachi: Stance resembling the letter "T" upside down.
- Kosa dachi: "Hooked leg" stance.
- Sagiashi dachi: "Heron foot" stance (one-legged).
- Ukiashi dachi: Stance resembling Nekoashi dachi, but more upright in a loose floating leg stance.

=== Uke-waza (blocking techniques) ===
- Gedan barai uke (Hari uke): Low-level, downward block / sweeping block.
- Yoko uke (Soto uke): Block from inside (centre of body), towards outside.
- Yoko uchi (Uchi uke): Block from outside, towards inside (centre of body).
- Age uke: Rising, upper-level block.
- Yoko Barai uke: Side, sweeping block.
- Uchi Otoshi uke: Circular, inside drop (downward pushing) block.
- Tsuki uke: Simultaneous punching (forearm) block.
- Te Kubi Sasae uke: Augmented (supported) wrist block.
- Sukui uke: Scoop block.
- Shuto uke: "Knife-hand" block.
- Kosa uke: "X" block (wrists crossed).
- Hijisasae uke: Augmented (inside-middle) elbow block.
- Osae uke: Pressing down block.
- Kakewake uke: Reverse-wedge block.
- Nagashi uke: Cross-body open-hand flowing/sweeping block.
- Shiuko uke (Haishu Uke): Open-hand, back-hand block.
- Shotei uke (Teisho): Palm-heel block.

=== Uchi-waza (striking techniques) ===
- Seiken tsuki: Fore fist, straight punch (for basic practice).
- Oi tsuki: Lunge punch.
- Gyaku tsuki: Reverse hand punch.
- Furi tsuki: Circular/swinging (roundhouse) punch.
- Age tsuki: Rising punch.
- Kagi tsuki: Hook punch.
- Mae Te tsuki: Lead-hand (forward hand) jab-punch.
- Ura tsuki: Inverted (palm up), close punch.
- Morote tsuki: U-shape punch.
- Tate tsuki: Vertical fist punch.
- Nihon tsuki: Double punch.
- Shuto uchi: "Knife" (chopping) hand strike.
- Ura uchi: Back fist punch.
- Kentsui uchi: Bottom fist strike.
- Shotei (Teisho) uchi: Palm-heel strike.
- Haito uchi: Ridge-hand strike.
- Haishu uchi: Open back-hand strike.
- Hiji ate uchi: Elbow strike.
- Koken uchi: Bent wrist-hand strike.

=== Keri-waza (kicking techniques) ===
- Mae geri: Front (forward & return) kick.
- Oi geri: Stepping (lunging forward) kick.
- Yoko sokuto geri: Side (edge of foot) kick.
- Mawashi geri: Roundhouse kick (to front).
- Gyaku (Uchi) Mawashi geri: Reverse direction (inside) roundhouse kick.
- Ura Mawashi geri: Back leg, hook kick to front (heel/ball of foot).
- Ushiro geri: Straight-back (backward) kick.
- Ushiro Mawashi geri: Spinning, back-roundhouse kick to front.
- Mae-ashi geri: Forward leg, front kick.
- Fumikomi geri: Stamping/thrusting kick.
- Hiza Geri: Knee cap kick.
- Ushiro-ura-mawashi geri: Spinning-back, roundhouse kick.
- Gyaku (Uchi) geri: Reverse (inside) roundhouse kick.
- Mae-tobi geri: Front (jumping/flying) kick.
- Yoko-tobi geri: Side (jumping/flying) kick.

== Notable practitioners ==
- Kenwa Mabuni (founder)
- Alexander Gerunov
- Antonio Díaz (karateka)
- Chuck Norris
- David Akutagawa
- Elisa Au
- Fumio Demura
- George Kotaka
- Gichin Funakoshi
- Gigo Funakoshi
- Harold Howard
- Isaac Florentine
- Kiyou Shimizu
- Mabuni Kenei
- Manzo Iwata
- Naresh Sharma
- Rika Usami
- Sakura Kokumai
- Sean Kanan
- Seth Petruzelli
- Shinpan Gusukuma
- Shōgō Kuniba
- Tanner Boser
- Yadira Lira
- Yasunari Ishimi
- Vicente Valverde
- Nejmi Alkan
- Craig Wardlow
- Shinsuke Nakamura
