= Shōgō Kuniba =

Japanese karateka (1935–1992)

- Born: February 5, 1935; Tokyo, Japan
- Died: July 14, 1992 (aged 57)
- Style: Shito-ryu karate
- Teacher: Kenwa Mabuni
- Rank: 8th dan karate

Shōgō Kuniba (国場 将豪, Kuniba Shōgō; February 5, 1935 - July 14, 1992) was a Japanese teacher of karate and iaido.

== Early life and training ==
Kuniba’s adoptive father, who is actually his biological uncle, was Kōsei Kokuba, who began training him at the age of five years. He was taught by many masters of the day including:

- Kenwa Mabuni – Shitō-ryū Karate
- Kōsei Kokuba – Motobu-ha Karate-dō
- Itoh Asakichi – Judo
- Ishii Gogetsu – Mugai-ryū Iaido
- Shōshin Nagamine – Shōrin-ryū Karate
- Kenko Nakaima – Kobudō
- Kosha Shojin – Bō and nunchaku
- Junko Yamaguchi – Tonfa
- Shioda Gozo – Aikido
- Ryusei Tomoyori – Kenyu-ryū Karate

When he was 24 years old, Shōgō Kuniba became the youngest karate system head (Sōke) in Japan, taking over the style his adoptive father (Kōsei Kokuba) had inherited from Motobu Chōki. He thus became the Sandai Soke of Ryukyu Karate Motobu-ha (Choki Motobu was Shodai Soke; Kosei Kokuba was Nidai Soke).

== Career ==
Kuniba was known for integrating the power of karate with the sensitivity of aikido and other traditional martial arts, in a style he called "Motobu-ha Shito-ryu." This style is structured to adopt concepts and techniques from other styles to form a modern system replete with traditional values, but with an open-minded philosophy. Shogo Kuniba was the Shodai Soke of Motobu-ha Shito-ryu Karate-do. It is sometimes referred to as Kuniba-ha Karate-do. A book titled A Primer of Kuniba-ha Karate-do: The Style of Shogo Kuniba was written and published in 1985 by James Herndon; it was republished in 2009.

At the age of 17, Kuniba started learning Mugai Ryu Iaido from Ishii Gogetsu, a practitioner of Mugai Ryu, himself a student of Nakagawa Shiryo Shinichi, 11th and last headmaster of Mugai Ryu. Kuniba proceeded to practice Mugai Ryu for the next 40 years. However, the style of Mugai Ryu, as taught by Ishii Gogetsu and then modified by Kuniba is sufficiently different from other branches of Mugai Ryu (Mugai Ryu splintered with the death of the Nakagawa, so no single orthodox line exists), that this branch of Mugai Ryu is commonly known as Kuniba Ryu. Amongst the most noticeable differences, are addition of kata not present in Mugai Ryu, that are thought to be added by both Ishii Gogetsu and Shōgō Kuniba.

Kuniba applied his knowledge of aikido, jujutsu, judo and other arts to the bunkai of karate kata. This made for very creative variations on techniques, which became his hallmark. He created a new style, Kuniba-ryū Goshindō (aka Goshin Budō Jujutsu), which literally means Kuniba's style of self-defense.

In Japan, Shōgō Kuniba was treated as a Meijin (brilliant man).

When Kuniba died on July 14, 1992, the organizations he had led split over leadership disagreements. Kunio Tatsuno became Sōke of Motobu-Ha Karate-dō and Kaicho of Seishinkai. In the U.S., Kuniba named William H. Price as second Sōke of both Kuniba-ryu Karate-Do and Kuniba-ryū Goshindō on March 16, 1992. Several American karateka under Kuniba followed his named U.S. successor. Chikubu-Kai was created on September 8, 1995, to continue his teachings. However, upon the death of Kunio Tatsuno, Kuniba-Kai was established in Japan by the Kuniba family in 1999. Many Shihan loyal to Kuniba have affiliated with Kuniba-Kai, headed by Kozo Kuniba and Kosuke Kuniba.

The style is called Kuniba-ryu Karate-Do in the U.S. and Motobu-Ha Shitō-ryū in Japan. Today, the Seishinkai (the Karate organization originally started by Kosei Kokuba) still exists to promote Shitō-ryū (however, the term "Motobu-Ha" is no longer claimed). A new International Seishinkai Karate-dō Union (ISKU) was formed by Kunio Tatsuno in 1999; in 2007, Sadatomu Harada formed the Seishinkai International Shitoryu Karate-dō Union (SISKU). Neither ISKU nor SISKU claim Motobu-Ha. Kuniba-Kai has exclusive rights to that style per the Japan Karate Federation (JKF).
