= Passai =

Karate kata

Passai (katakana パッサイ), also Bassai (バッサイ), is a karate kata. According to Motobu Chōki, the Passai kata was one of the three most practiced kata in Okinawa, along with Naihanchi and Kūsankū, but was already lost in China at the time. Originally there were two types of Passai, Dai (大, lit. 'big') and Shō (小, lit. 'small'), but today there are many different variations depending on the school. In 1935, Gichin Funakoshi changed the name of the Passai Dai (パッサイ大) to Bassai Shodan (抜塞初段, now Bassai Dai) to reflect the Japanese pronunciation and Kanji, and the pronunciation Bassai was subsequently popularized on the Japanese mainland.

The Passai kata is practiced today in various Korean martial arts besides karate, such as Taekwondo, Tang Soo Do, and Soo Bahk Do. In Korean, the kata have several names: Bassahee, Bal Se, Pal Che, Palsek, Bal Sae, Ba Sa Hee, and Bal Sak. The kata's focus is the idea of changing disadvantage into advantage by strong and courageous response, switching blocks and differing degrees of power. The feeling of kata should be precise, with fast execution of technique and attention given to appropriate balance between speed and power. Passai kata are usually classed as intermediate.

== History ==
Passai kata originated in the Ryukyu Kingdom (present-day Okinawa Prefecture, Japan), but its origins are unknown. According to Motobu Chōki, the kata was introduced to Ryūkyū from China but was lost in China. After the restoration of diplomatic relations between Japan and China in 1972, many Japanese karate practitioners have conducted research mainly in Fujian Province, China, but the original forms of many karate kata, including Passai, have not been discovered to this day.

One of the leading theories regarding the origin of Passai relates to the lion dance performed in Fujian Province. The lion dance is called "拍獅" (lit. 'beat lion') in Fujian, which is pronounced "pa sai" in Fuzhou and "phah sai" in Quanzhou (Minnan), respectively.

In his 1922 book, Gichin Funakoshi names the form Passai/パッサイ and provides no Kanji characters to go along with this name. The same "Passai" spelling is used by Motobu Chōki in 1926. By 1936, Funakoshi switches to calling the form Bassai/バッサイ but uses the characters "拔塞" which he spells as "Passai/パッサイ". "Bassai/Bá-sāi" would be the Chinese pronunciation of "拔塞", which in Japanese would be pronounced "Batsu-sai/ バツサイ".

Whereas the Japanese meaning of "拔(batsu)" is "to pull out or to extract",in Chinese "拔(bá)" can mean "to seize or capture"; and "塞(sai/soku)" means a "place of strategic importance" or fort. Thus, Funakoshi's characters of "Bá sāi(拔塞)" would mean "to seize or capture" a "place of importance/fortress." However, the 1973 translation of Karate-do Kyohan lists Funakoshi's explanation of the form name as "Breaking through an enemy's fortress."

The Korean Hangul spelling of the Hanja "拔塞" is balchae (Korean: 발채; pronounced [paltɕʰɛ]). Hwang Kee spells the form as both Basahee and Bassai, stating "the original name of the form is Pal Che (拔柴) [sic]". Both Hwang Kee claiming the form is affiliated with the "So Rim Sa" and Gichin Funakoshi who indicates the form is of "Shōrin-ryū /少林流" attribute the form to Chinese Shaolin/少林 styles, although originally, Funakoshi spelled this as "昭林流 [sic]".

== Versions ==
Of the Okinawan versions of Passai, a clear evolutionary link can be seen from Matsumura no Passai (named after the legendary Sokon Matsumura), to Oyadomari no Passai (named after the Tomari-te karate master Kokan Oyadomari), and then onto the Passai of Anko Itosu who popularized karate by introducing it into the curriculum of Okinawan schools. The Matsumura version has a distinct Chinese flavour, whereas the Oyadomari version is more "Okinawanized". It was further modified by Itosu, and is thought to have created a "sho" (Passai sho) form of it. Gichin Funakoshi of Shotokan took it to Japan and taught them as Bassai dai and Bassai sho. The Tomari style which incorporated Oyadomari no Passai was passed down the Oyadomari family for three generations, originally taught by a Chinese living in Tomari (possibly named Anan), who "used very light techniques". Sokon Matsumura also learned Chinese boxing from the military attachés Ason and Iwah at Fuzhou.

The Okinawans did not have a clear definition for the name "Passai" for Funakoshi to translate into Japanese, so he substituted it with a similar-sounding kanji, "Bassai". This can be literally translated to mean "extract from a fortress" or "remove an obstruction". This is thought to be in reference to the power with which the kata should be executed, emphasizing energy generation from the hips and waist. However, the designation of Bassai by the Japanese does not appear to have a direct relation to movements in the kata or its origins.

The Shorin-ryu version of Passai bears a close resemblance to Oyadomari no Passai, and is a much softer kata than Shotokan's Bassai dai. Further evidence that Passai has roots in Tomari city is that Passai dai starts with the right fist covered by the left hand, like other kata thought to have originated there, such as Jitte, Jion, Jiin and Empi. This hand gesture is a common salutation in China. However, there is some contention between researchers as to if there was a separate Tomari school of karate.

The suffix -dai means "large" and -sho "small". Hence, Passai sho is a shorter variation on Passai and also bears some resemblances to Bassai dai, indicating this kata may have been born out of combining elements of Passai and Passai sho. One notable point is that bunkai describes it as a defense against a bo.

Itosu is thought to have created this from a version of Bassai practiced in Shuri city. To confuse matters even more Bassai Sho is written exactly the same way as a Chinese form known as baji xiao which has a counterpart form known as baji da (from the bajiquan style), so perhaps this kata pair and the Dai-Sho naming scheme originates from China, invalidating the claim Itosu authored most of the -sho kata.

== See also ==
- Karate kata
