= Funakoshi =

Funakoshi (written: 船越, 舩越 or 舟越) is a Japanese surname. Notable people with the surname include:

- Eiichiro Funakoshi (船越 英一郎, born 1960), Japanese actor and television personality
- Eiji Funakoshi (船越 英二, 1923–2007), Japanese actor
- Gichin Funakoshi (船越 義珍, 1868–1957), Okinawan master of karate
- Gigō Funakoshi (船越 義豪, 1906–1945), son of Gichin Funakoshi
- Katsura Funakoshi (舟越 桂, born 1951), Japanese sculptor
- Rie Funakoshi (舩越 里恵, born 1985), better known as Rie fu, Japanese singer
- Yasutake Funakoshi (舟越 保武, 1912–2002), Japanese sculptor and painter
- Yuzo Funakoshi (船越 優蔵, born 1977), Japanese footballer

== See also ==
- 9842 Funakoshi, a main-belt asteroid
- Funakoshi Station, a railway station in Oga, Akita Prefecture, Japan
