= Jōdan =

Jōdan (上段, lit. 'high/upper degree'), which in a martial arts context means something like "high level", is one of the three heights commonly referred to in Japanese martial arts. It refers to the upper part of the body, which includes the shoulders and above.

== See also ==
- Chūdan
- Gedan
