= Neko ashi dachi =

Neko ashi dachi 猫足立

Neko ashi dachi (猫足立) is a karate low stance where all weight rests on the back leg, which is bent at the knee. In the stance, the rear foot is turned at about 20-30 degrees out and the knee sits at the same angle. Only the toes of the front foot rest on the ground, positioned in front of the back heel at about the same distance as the front foot of moto-dachi. There is no weight on the front foot, and there is no bent in the ankle joint - front knee, front shin, and the rise of the foot (but not the toes) form a single line, vertical in Shitō-ryū, tilted in Shotokan.

== See also ==
- Karate stances
