= Chūdan =

Chūdan (中段) is one of the three heights commonly referred to in Japanese martial arts. It roughly means "middle level", and refers to the space above and including the waist, and below but not including the shoulders. The most common strikes to the chūdan area target either the solar plexus or floating ribs.

== See also ==
- Jōdan
- Gedan
