= Sanchin dachi =

Sanchin dachi 三戦立

Sanchin dachi (三戦立) is a karate middle weight stance fixed and tensed in the same way as naihanchin-dachi. It can be described as uchi-hachiji-dachi with one foot moved forward until the toes of the rear foot are on the same horizontal line as the heel of the front foot. This powerful stance is serves as the foundational stance for all of Uechi-ryū kata, and it is used in the multitude of kata attributed to Kanryo Higashionna, from Sanchin to Suparimpei. Many advanced breathing techniques are exercised in this stance.

== See also ==
- Karate stances
