= Manzo Iwata =

Japanese karateka (1924–1993)

- Historical photo of Manzo Iwata
- Born: 9 February 1924; Tokyo, Japan
- Died: 4 June 1993 (aged 69)
- Style: Shito-ryu karate
- Teachers: Ueshiba Morihei, Kenwa Mabuni, Seiko Fujita
- Rank: 8th dan karate

Manzo Iwata (9 February 1924 – 4 June 1993) was a Japanese martial artist.

== Life and career ==
=== Early years ===
Manzo Iwata was born in Tokyo, Japan, to a family that owned the Iwata-en Tea Company. He began the study of Shito-ryu karate at the age of 10. In junior high school, he also studied judo and kendo. He studied aikido with Ueshiba Morihei, the founder of aikido and a good friend of his grandfather. Iwata enrolled at Toyo University in 1941 and began training in karate directly under Grandmaster Kenwa Mabuni, the founder of Shito-ryu karate. After beginning training in Kobudo Bujutsu or staff, Iwata was advised by Mabuni to study Jojutsu, or short staff, under Seiko Fujita. In 1943, Iwata received a Jojutsu Shihan diploma from Fujita. After graduating from Toyo University in 1944, Iwata also received a Shihan diploma from Mabuni. After the death of Fujita in 1966, Iwata became heir to many of his styles, but not of Kōga-ryū Wada Ha Ninjutsu.

=== Later years ===
In 1960, Iwata established the Nihon Karate-Do Kai Eastern Japan and became its first president. In 1964, he became vice-president of the All Japan Karate-Do Federation Shito-Kai. In 1969, he became the Saitama Prefecture Karate-Do Federation's vice-president. In 1972, he became an All Japan Karate-do Federation first-grade referee. In 1980, he became the president of Shito-Kai, and in 1993, received the Japan Martial Arts Distinguished Service Medal. He died of heart failure in 1993.
