= Pinan =

Series of five empty hand forms taught in many karate styles

- Other names: Ping'an, Pin'an, Heian, Pyung-Ahn, Pyeong-an
- Martial art: Karate
- Place of origin: (Okinawa Prefecture) Shuri, Okinawa, Japan
- Creator: Ankō Itosu
- Date of creation: 1880s

The Pinan (Chinese: 平安, Píng'ān; Japanese: ピンアン, Pin'an) kata are a series of five empty hand forms taught in many karate styles. The Pinan kata originated in Okinawa and were adapted by Anko Itosu from older kata such as Kusanku and Channan into forms suitable for teaching karate to young students. Pinan is the Chinese Pinyin notation of 平安; when Gichin Funakoshi brought karate to Japan, he changed the kata name to Heian (平(へい)安(あん)), which is the onyomi pronunciation of the same kanji. Pinan or Heian means "peaceful and safe". Korean Tang Soo Do, one of 5 original kwan of Korea, also practice these kata; they are termed, Pyung Ahn (Korean: 평안, Pyeong-an), which is a Korean pronunciation of the term "ping-an".

== History ==
According to Motobu Chōki, one of Ankō Itosu's early students, the Pinan kata was created by Itosu and were originally called Channan (チャンナン), possessing slightly different movements. When Motobu asked Itosu about this point in his later years, Itosu replied, "The form is somewhat different from those days, but now I have decided on the form as it was performed by the students. Everyone preferred the name Pinan, so I followed the young people's opinion."

Since Motobu (b. 1870) began studying under Itosu at the age of 12 (East Asian age reckoning), this confirms the Channan were already in existence by the 1880s. The name "Pinan" was suggested by students of the former Okinawa Prefectural First Middle School (now Shuri High School) or Okinawa Prefectural Normal School. Itosu was a karate instructor here at the time, and adopted the name "Pinan".

The Channan is now lost, but some believe that Motobu-ryū's "Shirokuma" (白熊, lit. 'white bear') kata may be Channan due to its similarity to Pinan.

The Pinan kata were introduced into the school systems on Okinawa in 1895. They were subsequently adopted by many teachers and schools in the 1900s. Thus, they are present today in the curriculum of Shitō-ryū, Wadō-ryū, Shōrin-ryū, Kobayashi-ryū, Kyokushin, Seido Juku, Shinki-Ryu, Shōrei-ryū, Shotojuku, Shotokan, Matsubayashi-ryū, Shukokai, Shindo Jinen Ryu, Koei-Kan, Kosho-ryū Kempo, Kenyu Ryu, Kushin Ryu and several other styles.

Funakoshi modified the Pinan forms to Heian forms, introducing his version of Kushanku (actually renamed Kanku Dai). The 5 kata were Pinans Shodan, Nidan, Sandan, Yondan, and Godan.

== Current practice ==
The Pinans are taught to various beginner ranks according to their difficulty. The kata are all loosely based on an I-shaped embusen or shape. These kata serve as the foundation to many of the advanced kata within Karate, as many of the techniques contained in these kata are contained in the higher grade katas as well, especially Kusanku.

In certain styles, Pinan Shodan and Pinan Nidan are inverted - what certain styles call Pinan Shodan is what others call Heian Nidan, and vice versa. For example, the kata Shotokan calls Heian Shodan, other styles, such as Shitō-ryū call Pinan Nidan.

Additionally, certain styles change the order in which the kata is taught. For example, Wado-Ryu, Shūkōkai teach Pinan Nidan first, and Pinan Shodan second, being Pinan Nidan is a more fundamental/beginner-friendly kata. The taught order is as follows.

1. Pinan Nidan,
2. Pinan Shodan,
3. Pinan Sandan,
4. Pinan Yondan (also called Pinan Shidan) and
5. Pinan Godan.

In some Shito-Ryu dojos the order is different, as most Shito Ryu versions of Pinan Shodan are harder than the rest, so the order is as follows,

1. Pinan Nidan
2. Pinan Sandan
3. Pinan Yondan (also called Pinan Shidan)
4. Pinan Godan
5. Pinan Shodan

== See also ==
- Karate kata
- Kata
- Taikyoku - The simplified versions of the pinan/heian kata.
