= Shotokan =

Karate style

Shōtōkan 松涛館流
- Date founded: 1928
- Country of origin: Japan (Okinawa)
- Founder: Gichin Funakoshi (1868–1957); Yoshitaka Funakoshi (1906–1945)
- Arts taught: Karate
- Ancestor schools: Shōrei-ryū, Shōrin-ryū
- Descendant schools: Wadō-ryū, Shōtōkai, Chitō-ryū, Shindō jinen-ryū, Yoseikan Karate, Kyokushin, Tang soo do, Taekwondo, (Note: Shotokan served as the basis for several styles practiced by a number of the original nine Kwans. The kwans eventually united and it led to a unified martial art style that is now known as Taekwondo. The kwans which style had Shotokan heritage included Song Moo Kwan, Chung Do Kwan, Moo Duk Kwan, Jidokwan, Yun Mu Kwan, Han Moo Kwan and Jung Do Kwan.) Soo Bahk Do
- Practitioners: (see notable practitioners)

Shotokan (松涛館, Shōtōkan) is a style of karate, developed from various martial arts by Gichin Funakoshi (1868–1957) and his son Gigo (Yoshitaka) Funakoshi (1906–1945). Gichin Funakoshi was born in Okinawa and is widely credited with popularizing "karate do" through a series of public demonstrations, and by promoting the development of university karate clubs, including those at Keio, Waseda, Hitotsubashi (Shodai), Takushoku, Chuo, Gakushuin, and Hosei.

Funakoshi had many students at the university clubs and outside dojos, who continued to teach karate after his death in 1957. However, internal disagreements (in particular the notion that competition is contrary to the essence of karate) led to the creation of different organisations—including an initial split between the Japan Karate Association (headed by Masatoshi Nakayama) and the Shotokai (headed by Motonobu Hironishi and Shigeru Egami), followed by many others—so that today there is no single "Shotokan school", although they all bear Funakoshi's influence.

As the most widely practiced style, Shotokan is considered a traditional and influential form of karate do.

== Etymology ==
Calligraphy of Shotokan

Shōtōkan was the name of the first official dojo built by Gichin Funakoshi, in 1936 at Mejiro, and destroyed in 1945 as a result of the Tokyo air raids. Shōto (松涛), meaning "pine-waves" (the movement of pine needles when the wind blows through them), was Funakoshi's pen-name, which he used in his poetic and philosophical writings and messages to his students. The Japanese kan (館) means "house" or "hall". In honour of their sensei, Funakoshi's students created a sign reading shōtō-kan, which they placed above the entrance of the hall where Funakoshi taught. Gichin Funakoshi never gave his system a name, just calling it karate.

== Characteristics and uses ==
Modern Shotokan training is usually divided into three parts: kihon (basics), kata (forms or patterns of moves), and kumite (sparring). Techniques in kihon and kata are characterised by deep, long stances that provide stability, enable powerful movements, and strengthen the legs. Shotokan is regarded as a dynamic martial art as it develops anaerobic, powerful techniques as well as developing speed. Initially strength and power are demonstrated instead of slower, more flowing motions. Those who progress to brown and black belt level develop a much more fluid style that incorporates grappling, throwing and some standing joint locking techniques, which can be found even in basic kata. Kumite (fighting) techniques are practiced in the kihon and kata and developed from basic to advanced levels with an opponent.

=== Philosophy ===
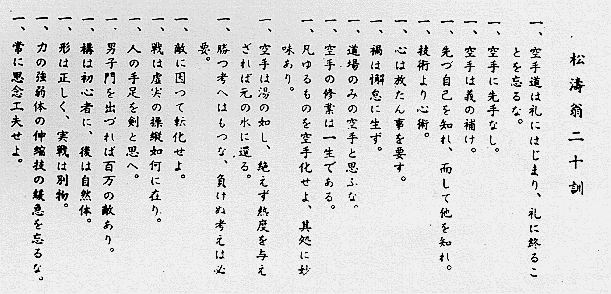
Calligraphy of the Niju kun

Gichin Funakoshi laid out the "Twenty Precepts of Karate" (or Niju kun), which form the foundations of the art, before some of his students established the Japan Karate Association (JKA). Within these twenty principles, based heavily on bushido and Zen, lies the philosophy of Shotokan. The principles allude to notions of humility, respect, compassion, patience, and both an inward and outward calmness. It was Funakoshi's belief that through karate practice and observation of these 20 principles, the karateka would improve their person.

The dōjō kun lists five philosophical rules for training in the dojo: seek perfection of character, be faithful, endeavor to excel, respect others, and refrain from violent behaviour. These rules are called the Five Maxims of Karate. The dōjō kun is usually posted on a wall in the dojo, and some shotokan clubs recite the dōjō kun at the beginning and/or end of each class to provide motivation and a context for further training.

Funakoshi also wrote: "The ultimate aim of Karate lies not in victory or defeat, but in the perfection of the character of the participant."

=== Common terms ===
Many terms used in karate stem from Japanese culture. While many are names (e.g. Heian, Gankaku), others are exclusive to martial arts (e.g. kata, kumite). Many terms are seldom used in daily life, such as zenkutsu dachi, while others appear routinely, such as rei. The Japanese form is often retained in schools outside Japan to preserve the Okinawan culture and Funakoshi's philosophies.

However, many schools of JKA (Japan Karate Association) affiliated with Shotokan Karate used the full terminology on a daily basis, providing translations also. For example, the KUI (Karate Union of Ireland), utilises the full and proper Japanese name for each move and kata in training, grading and competition.

=== Ranks ===
Rank is used in karate to indicate experience, expertise, and to a lesser degree, seniority. As with many martial arts, Shotokan uses a system of coloured belts to indicate rank. Most Shotokan schools use the kyū / dan system but have added other belt colours. The order of colours varies widely from school to school, but kyu belts are denoted with colours that in some schools become darker as a student approaches shodan. Dan level belts are invariably black, with some schools using stripes to denote various ranks of black belt. Gichin Funakoshi himself never awarded a rank higher than Godan (5th dan black belt).

=== Kihon ===
Kihon basics is the practice of basic techniques in Shotokan Karate. It includes stances, blocks, punches, kicks, various displacements and their combinations, as well as the practice of Kihon Kata like: Taikyoku Shodan, which was developed by Yoshitaka Funakoshi, the son of Gichin Funakoshi, as a basic introduction to karate kata. (Yoshitaka also developed Taikyoku Nidan and Sandan.) This first kata consists of successive restatements following the theme of gedan barai—oi tsuki, and performing three oi tsuki by following the known "H" pattern or Embusen.

=== Kata ===
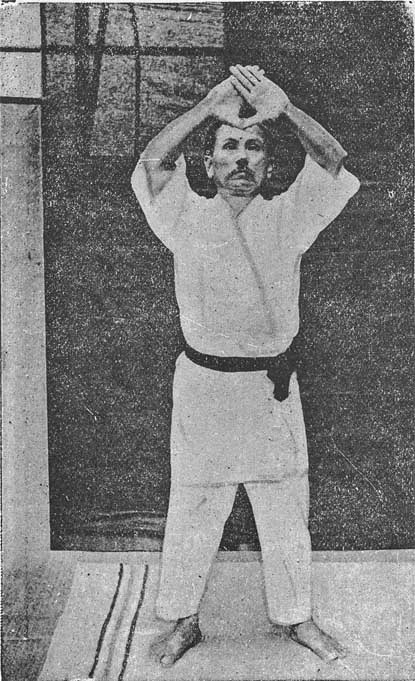
Gichin Funakoshi executing Kanku dai (観空大) kata, 1924

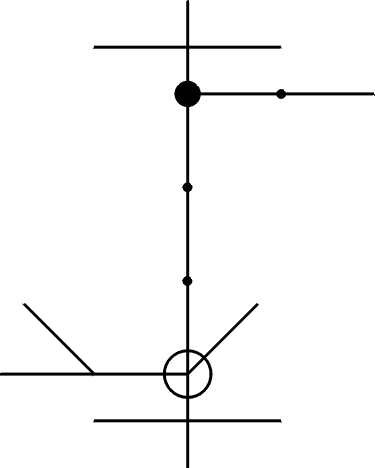
The embusen of the Heian Shodan kata

Kata is often described as a set sequence of karate moves organised into a pre-arranged fight against imaginary opponents. The kata consists of kicks, punches, sweeps, strikes and blocks. Body movement in various kata includes stepping, twisting, turning, dropping to the ground, and jumping. In Shotokan, kata is a performance or a demonstration, with every technique potentially a killing blow (ikken hisatsu)—while paying particular attention to form and timing (rhythm). As the karateka grows older, more emphasis is placed on the health benefits of practicing kata, promoting fitness while keeping the body soft, supple, and agile.

Several Shotokan groups have introduced "kata" (form) from other styles into their training. The original Shotokan kata syllabus is introduced in Funakoshi's book Karate-do Kyohan, which is the master text of Shotokan karate. Japan Shotokai's kata syllabus is the same as established in "Karate-do Kyohan" with the addition of Gigo Funakoshi's staff kata Matsukaze No Kon. When the JKA was formed, Nakayama laid down 27 kata (26 mainly practised throughout most organisations) as the kata syllabus for this organisation. The standard JKA kata are: Taikyoku shodan (sometimes termed Kata Kihon or Kihon Kata, the name has been discontinued in some Shotokan dojos) (太極初段), Heian shodan (平安初段), Heian nidan (平安二段), Heian sandan (平安三段), Heian yondan (平安四段), Heian godan (平安五段), Bassai dai (披塞大), Jion (慈恩), Enpi (燕飛), Kanku dai (観空大), Hangetsu (半月), Jitte (十手), Gankaku (岩鶴), Tekki shodan (鉄騎初段), Tekki nidan (鉄騎二段), Tekki sandan (鉄騎三段), Nijūshiho (二十四步), Chinte (珍手), Sōchin (壯鎭), Meikyō/Rōhai (明鏡), Unsu (雲手), Bassai shō (披塞小), Kankū shō (観空小), Wankan (王冠), Gojūshiho shō (五十四歩小), Gojūshiho dai (五十四歩大), and Ji'in (慈陰).

The Embusen of a kata is the start and the end points of the kata, as well as the floor pattern of the lines of movement. It is the map of the kata, as seen from above.

=== Kumite ===
Kumite, or sparring (lit. Meeting of hands), is the practical application of kihon and kata to real opponents. The formalities of kumite in Shotokan karate were first instituted by Masatoshi Nakayama wherein basic, intermediate, and advanced sparring techniques and rules were formalised.

Shotokan practitioners first learn how to apply the techniques taught in kata to hypothetical opponents by way of kata bunkai. Kata bunkai then matures into controlled kumite.

Kumite is the third part of the Shotokan triumvirate of kihon, kata and kumite. Kumite is taught in ever increasing complexity from beginner through low grade blackbelt (1st – 2nd) to intermediate (3rd – 4th) and advanced (5th onwards) level practitioners.

Beginners first learn kumite through basic drills, of one, three or five attacks to the head (jodan) or body (chudan) with the defender stepping backwards whilst blocking and only countering on the last defence. These drills use basic (kihon) techniques and develop a sense of timing and distance in defence against a known attack.

At around purple belt level karateka learn one-step sparring (ippon kumite). Though there is only one step involved, rather than three or five, this exercise is more advanced because it involves a greater variety of attacks and blocks usually the defenders own choice. It also requires the defender to execute a counter-attack faster than in the earlier types of sparring. Counter-attacks may be almost anything, including strikes, grapples, and take-down manoeuvres.

Some schools prescribe the defences, most notably the Kase-ha Shotokan-ryū, which uses an eight step, three directional blocking and attacking pattern, which develops from yellow belt level through to advanced level.

The next level of kumite is freestyle one-step sparring (jiyu ippon kumite). This type of kumite, and its successor—free sparring, have been documented extensively by Nakayama and are expanded upon by the JKA instructor trainee program, for those clubs under the JKA. Freestyle one-step sparring is similar to one-step sparring but requires the karateka to be in motion. Practicing one-step sparring improves free sparring (jiyu kumite) skills, and also provides an opportunity for practicing major counter-attacks (as opposed to minor counter-attacks). Tsutomu Ohshima states that freestyle one-step sparring is the most realistic practice in Shotokan Karate, and that it is more realistic than free sparring.

Free sparring (or free style) (jiyu kumite) is the last element of sparring learned. In this exercise, two training partners are free to use any karate technique or combination of attacks, and the defender at any given moment is free to avoid, block, counter, or attack with any karate technique. Training partners are encouraged to make controlled and focused contact with their opponent, but to withdraw their attack as soon as surface contact has been made. This allows attacking a full range of target areas (including punches and kicks to the face, head, throat, and body) with no padding or protective gloves, but maintains a degree of safety for the participants. Throwing one's partner and performing takedowns are permitted in free sparring, but it is unusual for competition matches to involve extended grappling or ground-wrestling, as Shotokan karateka are encouraged to end an encounter with a single attack (ippon), avoiding extended periods of conflict, or unnecessary contact in situations where there may be more than one attacker.

Kaishu ippon kumite is an additional sparring exercise that is usually introduced for higher grades. This starts in a similar manner to freestyle one-step sparring; the attacker names the attack he/she will execute, attacks with that technique, and the defender blocks and counters the attack. Unlike freestyle one-step sparring, however, the attacker may then be required to block the defender's counter-attack and strike back. This exercise is often considered more difficult than either freestyle one-step sparring or free sparring, as the defender typically cannot escape to a safe distance in time to avoid the counter to the counter-attack.

Kumite within the dojo often differs from competition kumite. In dojo kumite any and all techniques, within reason, are valid; punches, knife hand strikes, headbutt, locks, takedowns, kicks, etc. In competition certain regulations apply, certain techniques are valid, and certain target areas, such as the joints or throat, are forbidden. The purpose of competition is to score points through the application of kumite principles while creating an exciting and competitive atmosphere, whereas the purpose of training kumite in the dojo is to be prepared to kill or cripple an opponent in a realistic situation.

== History ==
Gichin Funakoshi had trained in both of the popular styles of Okinawan karate of the time: Shōrei-ryū and Shōrin-ryū. After years of study in both styles, Funakoshi created a simpler system that combined the ideals of the two. He never named this system, however, always referring to it simply as "karate". Funakoshi's karate reflects the changes made in the art by Ankō Itosu, including the Heian/Pinan kata series. Funakoshi changed the names of some of the kata in an effort to make the Okinawan kata names easier to pronounce in the Japanese Honshū dialect.

In 1924, Funakoshi adopted the Kyū / Dan rank system and the uniform (keikogi) developed by Kano Jigoro, the founder of judo. This system uses colored belts (obi) to indicate rank. Originally, karate had only three belt colors: white, brown, and black (with ranks within each). The original belt system, still used by many Shotokan schools, is:

- 8th rising to 4th kyū: white
- 3rd rising to 1st kyū: brown
- 1st and higher dan: black

Funakoshi awarded the first 1st dan (初段; shodan) Shotokan karate ranks to Tokuda, Hironori Ōtsuka (Otsuka), Akiba, Shimizu, Hirose, Makoto Gima, and Shinyō Kasuya on 10 April 1924.

== Notable practitioners ==
- Anne-Marie
- Bear Grylls
- Benny Urquidez
- Fran Healy (musician)
- Frank Brennan
- Gabriel Varga
- Geoff Thompson (writer)
- Henry Cejudo
- Hideaki Yamazaki
- Hidetaka Nishiyama
- Jerry Bell
- Hiroshi Shirai
- Howard Stern
- Hwang Kee
- James delos Santos
- Jason David Frank
- Jean-Claude Van Damme
- John Saxon
- Kyoji Horiguchi
- Lorraine Bracco
- Teruyuki Okazaki
- Luca Valdesi
- Lyoto Machida (Note: "Holds a 3rd dan black belt in Shotokan karate, while his brother Shinzo holds a 4th dan and their father Yoshizo Machida holds a 7th dan and was head of the Japan Karate Association's Brazilian branch.)
- Mas Oyama
- Masahiko Tanaka
- Masatoshi Nakayama
- Michael Jai White (Note: Has a 3rd dan in Shotokan, although he has long practiced other karate styles such as Kyokushin and Goju Ryu)
- Tatsuya Naka
- Rafael Aghayev
- Robert Queen
- Sean Kanan
- Shigeru Egami
- Stan Lane
- T. J. Stiles
- Taiji Kase
- Wesley Snipes
- Won Kuk Lee
- Xolo Maridueña
- Daniel Goodall
- Richard Goodall

== See also ==
- U.S. intercollegiate shotokan karate champions
- List of major Shotokan Karate organizations
- List of shotokan techniques

== Bibliography ==
- Shojiro Sugiyama. (2005).11 Innovations in Karate, ISBN 978-0-9669048-3-3. Chicago, IL.
- Bruce Clayton. Shotokan's Secret: The Hidden Truth Behind Karate's Fighting Origins, ISBN 978-0897501880
- Harry Cook. Shotokan Karate: A Precise History.
- Gichin Funakoshi. Karate-do Kyohan: The Master Text, ISBN 978-1568364827
- Gichin Funakoshi. Karate-do Nyumon: The Master Introductory Text. ISBN 978-4770018915
- John Sells. Unante: The Secrets of Karate (Panchita S. Hawley, 2nd ed. 2000), ISBN 0-910704-96-1 .
- Masatoshi Nakayama. Dynamic Karate, ISBN 978-1568364131
- Randall G. Hassell. Shotokan Karate: Its History and Evolution (Damashi, 1984). ISBN 0-911921-05-2.
- Randall G. Hassell and Edmond Otis. "The Complete Idiot's Guide to Karate". (Penguin Group (USA), 2000), ISBN 978-0028638324
- Rob Redmond. Kata: The Folk Dances of Shotokan.
- Teruyuki Okazaki. Perfection of Character: Guiding Principles for the Martial arts & Everyday Life, ISBN 978-0978576325
- Willy J. Ortiz. "Funakoshi, Father of Modern Karate" ISBN 952-92-0852-9
