= Kenwa Mabuni =

Okinawan karateka

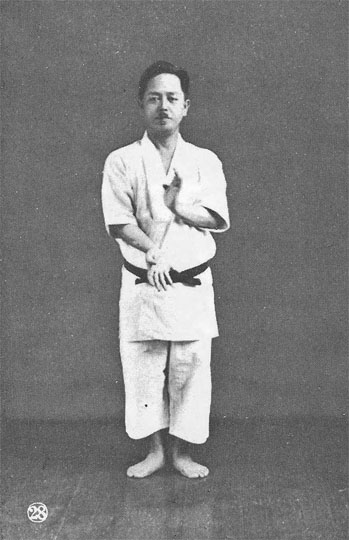
- Born: November 14, 1889; Shuri, Okinawa
- Died: May 23, 1952 (aged 62); Tokyo, Japan
- Style: Shitō-ryū
- Teachers: Ankō Itosu, Higaonna Kanryō, Gokenki
- Rank: Founder of Shitō-ryū

Other information
- Notable students: Kenei Mabuni, Iwata Manzo, Chōjirō Tani Sei Iwasa

Kenwa Mabuni (摩文仁 賢和, Mabuni Kenwa; 14 November 1889 - 23 May 1952) was one of the first karateka to teach karate in mainland Japan and is credited as developing the style known as Shitō-ryū. Originally, he chose the name Hanko-ryu, literally "half-hard style", to imply that the style used both hard and soft techniques. Finally, Mabuni chose Shito-ryu, the first characters of the names Itosu and Higaonna, his two primary teachers.

== Achievements ==
1. Funakoshi Gichin learned kata from Kenwa Mabuni: In order to expand his knowledge he sent his son Gigō to study kata in Mabuni's dōjō in Osaka.
2. Kenwa Mabuni, Motobu Chōki and other Okinawans were actively teaching karate in Japan prior to this point when Gichin Funakoshi 'officially' brought karate from Okinawa to mainland Japan.
3. Shitō-ryū (糸東流) is a school of karate that was founded by Kenwa Mabuni in 1931. In 1939 the style was officially registered in the Butoku Kai headquarters.
4. The development of the katas Aoyagi/Seiryuu and Meijou/Myoujo, while teaching at a women's school, but not specifically for women, under request of the Japanese government at the time.

== Early years ==
Born in Shuri on Okinawa in 1889, Mabuni was a 17th generation descendant of the famous warrior Uni Ufugusuku Kenyu. Perhaps because of his weak constitution, he began his instruction in his home town in the art of Shuri-Te (首里手) at the age of 13, under the tutelage of the legendary Ankō Yasutsune Itosu (糸州安恒) (1831-1915). He trained diligently for several years, learning many kata from this great master. It was Itosu who first developed the Pinan kata, which were most probably derived from the 'Kusanku' form.

One of his close friends, Chōjun Miyagi (宮城長順) (founder of Gōjū-ryū) introduced Mabuni to another great of that period, Higaonna Kanryō (東恩納寛量), and began to learn Naha-Te (那覇手) under him as well. While both Itosu and Higashionna taught a 'hard-soft' style of Okinawan 'Te', their methods and emphases were quite distinct: the Itosu syllabus included straight and powerful techniques as exemplified in the Naifanchi and Bassai kata; the Higashionna syllabus, on the other hand, stressed circular motion and shorter fighting methods as seen in the popular Seipai and Kururunfa forms. Shitō-ryū focuses on both hard and soft techniques to this day.

Although he remained true to the teachings of these two instructors, Mabuni sought instruction from a number of other teachers; including Seishō Aragaki, Tawada Shimboku, Sueyoshi Jino and Wu Xianhui (a Chinese master known as Go-Kenki). In fact, Mabuni was legendary for his encyclopaedic knowledge of kata and their bunkai applications. By the 1920s, he was regarded as the foremost authority on Okinawan kata and their history and was much sought after as a teacher by his contemporaries. There is even some evidence that his expertise was sought out in China, as well as Okinawa and mainland Japan. As a police officer, he taught local law enforcement officers and at the behest of his teacher Itosu, began instruction in the various grammar schools in Shuri and Naha.

== Shito-ryu history ==
In an effort to popularise karate in mainland Japan, Mabuni made several trips to Tokyo in 1917 and 1928. Although much that was known as 'Te' (Hand) or Karate had been passed down through many generations with jealous secrecy, it was his view that it should be taught to anyone who sought knowledge with honesty and integrity. In fact, many masters of his generation held similar views on the future of Karate: Gichin Funakoshi (船越義珍)(founder of Shotokan (松濤館)), another contemporary, had moved to Tokyo in the 1920s to promote their art on the mainland as well.

During this period, Mabuni also taught many other prominent martial artists, such as Otsuka Hironori (founder of Wadō-ryū) and Yasuhiro Konishi(founder of Shindō jinen-ryū). Both men were students of Funakoshi.

By 1929, Mabuni had moved to Osaka on the mainland, to become a full-time karate instructor of a style he originally called Hanko-ryū, or 'half-hard style'. In an effort to gain acceptance in the Japanese Butokukai, the governing body for all officially recognised martial arts in that country, he and his contemporaries decided to call their art 'Karate' or 'Empty Hand', rather than 'Chinese Hand', perhaps to make it sound more Japanese. Around the same time, perhaps when first introducing his style to the Butokukai, is when it's believed the name of the style changed to Shitō-ryū, in honour of its main influences. Mabuni derived the name for his new style of Shitō-ryū from the on'yomi readings of the first Kanji character in their names, "Shi" for Ito(糸)su and "Tō" for Higashi(東)onna. With the support of Sakagami Ryusho (1915-1993), he opened a number of Shitō-ryū dojo in the Osaka area, including Kansai University and the Japan Karate-dō Kai dōjō. To this day, the largest contingent of Shitō-ryū practitioners in Japan is centred in the Osaka area. However, Mabuni's contemporary Shinpan Shiroma remained in Shuri, Okinawa, and established Okinawan Shito-ryu.

== Career ==
Mabuni published a number of books on the subject and continued to systematise the instruction method. Perhaps more than any other Master in the last century, Mabuni was steeped in the traditions and history of Karate-do, yet forward thinking enough to realise that it could spread throughout the world. To this day, Shitō-ryū recognises the influences of Itosu and Higashionna: the kata syllabus of Shito-ryū is still often listed in such a way as to show the two lineages.

In his latter years, he developed a number of formal kata, such as Aoyagi/Seiryu ('Green Willow') with Yasuhiro Konishi under the assistance of Ueshiba Morihei and Meijō, for example, which were designed specifically for women's self-defence.

== Later years ==
Kenwa Mabuni died in 1952, and he is succeeded by his sons Kenei and Kenzo. His son Kenzo Mabuni died on 26 June 2005, and was succeeded by his daughter. His son Kenei Mabuni died 19 December 2015 and was succeeded by his son Kenyu Mabuni.

== Sources ==
- Mabuni, Kenei (2009): Empty Hand – The Essence of Budo Karate. Chemnitz: Palisander Verlag. ISBN 978-3-938305-13-3
- Habersetzer, Gabrielle & Roland (2004): Encyclopédie des arts martiaux de l'Extrême-Orient, Ed. Amphora, Paris. ISBN 978-2-85180-660-4
