= Jion kata group =

Style of karate

Ji'in, Jion, and Jitte form a group of kata used in Shotokan and other karate styles, beginning with the same characteristic kamae of the left hand covering the right, which apparently has roots in ancient Chinese boxing. Their origin is thought to be from the Tomari-te school, however Hirokazu Kanazawa speculates that the Jion kata were devised in the Jionji 慈恩寺, the Jion temple, where martial arts were famously practiced. From there, Kanazawa believes the Jion kata were spread into the Tomari region.

== Ji'in ==
Ji'in 慈陰 ("Temple Ground") is important for the execution of many simultaneous techniques and the often-repeated stances, enabling swift changes of direction while maintaining balance, power and steps of equal length. It has, however, been removed from the Japan Karate Association teaching and grading syllabus.

== Jion ==
Jion 慈恩 ("Temple Sound") is a representative kata in the Shotokan system because of the importance of the perfection of the basic stances it contains, notably zenkutsu dachi (front stance) and kiba dachi (horse stance). Also practiced in some Shitō-ryū organizations, emphasis is also placed on Kokutsu dachi, or back stance.

== Jitte ==
The name Jitte 十手 ("Ten Hands") expresses that mastery of this kata which enables one to fight like ten men. Jitte teaches techniques usable against armed attacks, especially the bo. It consists of 24 movements and should be performed in about 60 seconds.

Also known in some styles as Sip Soo.

Both "Jitte" and "Jutte" are correct pronunciations and romanized spellings of the kanji 十手.

== See also ==
- Wado Ryu
