= Ankō Itosu =

Okinawan karateka (1831–1915)

Ankō Itosu 糸洲 安恒
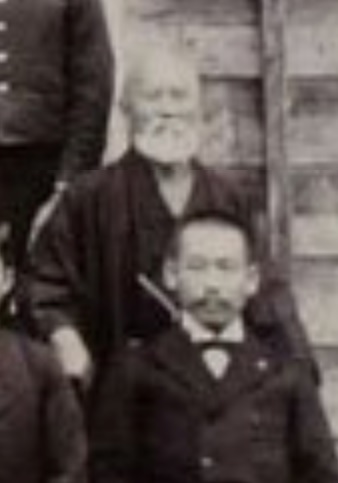
- Born: 1831; Gibo Village, Shuri, Ryūkyū Kingdom (Present day: Okinawa prefecture, Japan)
- Died: 11 March 1915 (aged 83–84); Shuri, Okinawa, Japan
- Other names: Itosu Yasutsune
- Style: Shuri-te
- Teachers: Nagahama Chikudun of Naha, Sokon Matsumura

Other information
- Notable students: Choyu Motobu, Choki Motobu, Kentsu Yabu, Chomo Hanashiro, Gichin Funakoshi, Moden Yabiku, Kanken Toyama, Shinpan Gusukuma (Shiroma), Anbun Tokuda, Kenwa Mabuni, Chōshin Chibana

Ankō Itosu (糸洲 安恒, Okinawan: Ichiji Ankō; Japanese: Itosu Ankō, 1831 – 11 March 1915) is considered by many the father of modern karate. This title is also often given to Gichin Funakoshi because of the latter spreading karate throughout Japan.

== Biography ==
Itosu was born in 1831 and died in 1915. A low-rank Ryūkyūan Pechin, Itosu was small in stature, shy, and introverted as a child. He was raised in a strict home of the keimochi (a family of position), and was educated in the Chinese classics and calligraphy. Itosu began his tode (karate) study under Nagahama Chikudun Pechin. His study of the art led him to Sokon Matsumura. Part of Itosu's training was makiwara practice. He once tied a leather sandal to a stone wall in an effort to build a better makiwara. After several strikes, the stone fell from the wall. After relocating the sandal several times, Itosu had destroyed the wall.

Itosu served as a secretary to the last king of the Ryūkyū Kingdom until Japan abolished the Okinawa-based native monarchy in 1879. In 1905, Itosu was a part-time teacher of To-te at Okinawa's First Junior Prefectural High School. It was here that he developed the systematic method of teaching karate techniques that are still in practice today. He created and introduced the Pinan forms (Heian in Japanese) as learning steps for students, because he felt the older forms (kata in Japanese) were too difficult for schoolchildren to learn. The five Pinan forms were (allegedly) created by drawing from two older forms: kusanku and chiang nan. In Okinawa, it is said Itosu always walked in the Naihanchi stance. According to Chibana Choshin, Itosu may also have expanded on the existing Naihanchi forms (Tekki in Shōtōkan related styles) to create the third form, which would become Naihanchi Sandan. In 1908, Itosu wrote the influential "Ten Precepts (Tode Jukun) of Karate," reaching beyond Okinawa to Japan.

While Itosu did not invent karate himself, he modified the kata (forms) he learned from his master, Matsumura Sōkon, and taught many karate masters. Itosu's students included Choyu Motobu (1857–1927), Choki Motobu (1870–1944), Kentsu Yabu (1866–1937), Chomo Hanashiro (1869–1945), Gichin Funakoshi (1868–1957), Moden Yabiku (1880–1941), Kanken Toyama (1888–1966), Shinpan Shiroma (Gusukuma) (1890–1954), Anbun Tokuda (1886–1945), Kenwa Mabuni (1889–1952), and Chōshin Chibana (1885–1969).

== Ten Precepts (Tode Jukun) of Karate ==
In October 1908, Itosu wrote a letter, "Ten Precepts (Tode Jukun) of Karate," to draw the attention of the Ministry of Education and the Ministry of War in Japan. A translation of that letter reads:

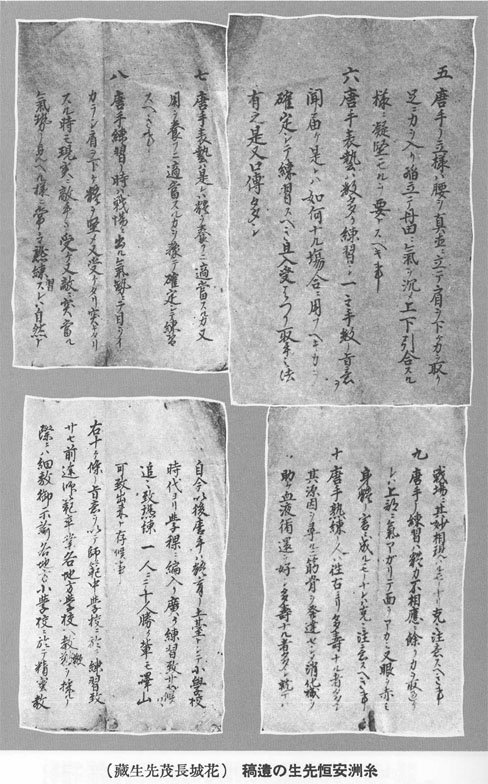
Ten Precepts of Karate

Ten Precepts of Karate
Karate did not develop from Buddhism or Confucianism. In the past the Shorin-ryu school and the Shorei-ryu school were brought to Okinawa from China. Both of these schools have strong points, which I will now mention before there are too many changes:

1. Karate is not merely practiced for your own benefit; it can be used to protect one's family or master. It is not intended to be used against a single assailant but instead as a way of avoiding a fight should one be confronted by a villain or ruffian.
2. The purpose of karate is to make the muscles and bones hard as rock and to use the hands and legs as spears. If children were to begin training in Tang Te while in elementary school, then they will be well suited for military service. Remember the words attributed to the Duke of Wellington after he defeated Napoleon: "The Battle of Waterloo was won on the playing fields of Eton."
3. Karate cannot be quickly learned. Like a slow moving bull, it eventually travels a thousand miles. If one trains diligently every day, then in three or four years one will come to understand karate. Those who train in this fashion will discover karate.
4. In karate, training of the hands and feet is important, so one must be thoroughly trained on the makiwara. In order to do this, drop your shoulders, open your lungs, take hold of your strength, grip the floor with your feet, and sink your energy into your lower abdomen. Practice using each arm one to two hundred times each day.
5. When one practices the stances of Tang Te, be sure to keep your back straight, lower your shoulders, put strength in your legs, stand firmly, and drop your energy into your lower abdomen.
6. Practice each of the techniques of karate repeatedly, the use of which is passed by word of mouth. Learn the explanations well, and decide when and in what manner to apply them when needed. In karate, there are techniques for striking an opponent, as well as for receiving and deflecting an opponent's attack. In addition, there is a secret technique called torite (tuitī in Okinawan dialect), which is a rule passed down orally.
7. You must decide if karate is for your health or to aid your duty.
8. When you train, do so as if on the battlefield. Your eyes should glare, shoulders drop, and body harden. You should always train with intensity and spirit, and in this way you will naturally be ready.
9. One must not overtrain; this will cause you to lose the energy in your lower abdomen and will be harmful to your body. Your face and eyes will turn red. Train wisely.
10. In the past, masters of karate have enjoyed long lives. Karate aids in developing the bones and muscles. It helps the digestion as well as the circulation. If karate should be introduced beginning in the elementary schools, then we will produce many men each capable of defeating ten assailants. I further believe this can be done by having all students at the Okinawa Teachers' College practice karate. In this way, after graduation, they can teach at the elementary schools at which they have been taught. I believe this will be a great benefit to our nation and our military. It is my hope you will seriously consider my suggestion.

Anko Itosu, October 1908

This letter was influential in the spread of karate.

== See also ==
- Okinawan martial arts
- Pechin/Peichin

== Notes ==
'Tang Te' means 'China Art' or 'China Hand.'
'Makiwara' refers to the striking post, a training aid in karate.
