= Bunkai =

Analysis method in Japanese martial arts

Bunkai (分解), literally meaning "analysis" or "disassembly", "is a term used in Japanese martial arts referring to process of analysing kata and extracting fighting techniques from the movements of a 'form' (kata). The extracted fighting techniques are called “Oyo”.

== Process ==
Bunkai is usually performed with a partner or a group of partners which execute predefined attacks, and the student performing the kata responds with defenses, counterattacks, or other actions, based on a part of the kata. This allows the student in the middle to understand what the movements in kata are meant to accomplish. It also illustrates how to improve the technique by adjusting distances (Maai), timing, rhythm (Ritsudo) and fluidity (Nagare) in combat properly, in order to adapt and adjust any technique depending on the size of an opponent.

Some kata have another layer of application that is taught using an Oyo Bunkai, an "application of the kata in ways other than the standard bunkai." Different practitioners will learn or discover alternative applications, but the bunkai, like the kata, varies based on the style and the teacher.

A single kata posture or movement may be broken into anywhere from a few to a few dozen applications, and the same sequence of kata moves may sometimes be interpreted in different ways resulting in several bunkai. Students are encouraged to consider each movement and technique in a kata in response to multiple possible attacks, for example: use of a particular movement against a kick, against a punch, against various forms of grappling. Through analysis of the move and practice in variant scenarios, the student will unlock new techniques and expand their understanding of known ones. Some martial arts require students to perform bunkai for promotion.

Bunkai can be obvious or elusive depending on the technique in question, the moves preceding and following it, and the individual practitioner. There are usually many stages of depth of comprehension of bunkai only reached through the passage of time. The terms toridai and himitsu are used to refer to techniques not readily seen to the casual observer and hidden techniques within kata. For example, in Gōjū-ryū karate, two-man kata training is used to reinforce bunkai and correct technique. If techniques in the kata are not performed correctly they will not be effective in two man training.

== Rule sets for the process of bunkai ==
There are sets of rules which can be used to aid the correct analysis of kata for meaningful applications. Historically these were reputed to have been kept secret to prevent those without the rules from deciphering the meaning of the kata. The rule set used by Gōjū-ryū masters was known as Kaisai no genri. Similar but expanded and clarified rule sets have become available which are generally applicable to other styles of karate kata.

== Historical contention ==
It has been claimed by martial arts historian Nathan Johnson that the few original antique kata found in karate were actually intended for weapons combat or (in one example) for grappling, as opposed to ballistic strikes.

== See also ==
- Karate kata
- Kihon
