= Stance =

Stance may refer to:

== Sports ==
- Stance (American football), the position an American football player adopts when a play begins
- Stance (martial arts), the distribution, foot orientation and body positions adopted when attacking, defending, advancing or retreating
  - Stances (tae kwon do), several stances used for different activities
  - Horse stance, a posture in Asian martial arts
  - Karate stances, body positions used to create power, flexibility and movement
  - Wushu stances, a fundamental part of all Chinese martial arts
- Stance (yoga), also known as a posture or asana, a body position

== Music ==
- Stance (EP), a 1978 record by R. Stevie Moore

== Other uses ==
- Stance (brand), an American sock and underwear brand
- Stance (vehicle), a characteristic of a motor vehicle
- Stance (Vranje), a village in the municipality of Vranje, Serbia
- Stance (linguistics), linguistic expression of judgement or philosophical position
- Emanuel Stance (1843-1887), a Buffalo Soldier in the United States Army
- Life stance, a person's relation with what they accept as being of ultimate importance
- A philosophical position in a logical argument
- Various human positions, especially standing positions
