= Triangle theory (boxing) =

Fighting Theory

Triangle Theory is a theory used in boxing. It uses equilateral triangles to explain how to create advantageous angles to strike opponents while limiting their ability to effectively strike back. While triangle theory is highly effective in boxing, its use is limited, and often risky, in other martial arts. Triangle theory in boxing should not be confused with triangle theory as used in Wing Chun.

== Boxing ==
Triangle theory is based on the idea of positioning yourself and your opponent within an equilateral triangle. The fighter stands at one point of the triangle, while the opponent is positioned at the center. By moving along the sides of the triangle rather than straight forward or backward, a boxer can create angles that disrupt the opponent’s defense and open up offensive opportunities. This method allows a fighter to attack from a 45-degree angle, making it harder for the opponent to defend or counter effectively.

Instead of engaging in a straightforward exchange, the boxer slips, pivots, and steps laterally to gain a positional advantage. The boxer attempts to keep the opponent in the center of the triangle while maneuvering along its edges, forcing them to constantly adjust and leaving them vulnerable to attacks.

When applied offensively, triangle theory allows a boxer to land punches from unexpected angles. A direct head-on attack is easier to block or evade, but by stepping at an angle, a fighter can bypass an opponent’s guard and strike exposed areas like the chin or body. For example, when boxers are in a closed stance, instead of throwing a straight cross directly in front of an opponent, a fighter can slip a jab, step to the side at a 45-degree angle, and deliver a cross from an angle where the opponent has a reduced ability to see it and block.

Defensively, the triangle theory helps fighters evade punches while setting up counters. By slipping and stepping off at an angle, a boxer can avoid incoming strikes while simultaneously positioning themselves for a counterattack. For instance, if an opponent throws a jab, the boxer can slip to the outside and pivot, placing themselves in a spot where the opponent must turn to face them. This constant shifting of angles disrupts the opponent’s rhythm, making it difficult for them to mount an effective offense.

Although triangle theory is applied to both sides of an opponent, there is a significant difference in risk between these movements. Moving outside of an opponents lead leg and shoulder is considered safer than moving outside of an opponents rear leg and shoulder.

Moving outside of the opponent's lead leg and shoulder makes it more difficult for an opponent to strike and if they do it is with their weaker hand. Moving outside of an opponents rear leg and shoulder still allows the opponent to strike with the lead hook, and moving towards the opponent's rear leg and shoulder is riskier as it is moving towards the opponent's power hand and if that connects is more likely to result in a knockout.

== Martial arts ==
Triangle theory has limited relevance in many martial arts besides boxing. This is partly due to the rule set of boxing. In boxing, techniques such as backfists are prohibited. If a boxer moves outside of their opponents lead leg and shoulder their opponent has limited ability to hit them because the boxer cannot use techniques such as backfists, spinning backfists, spinning kicks, hook kicks, outside crescent kicks and twist kicks which could be used to strike an opponent even if they move outside of your lead or rear leg and shoulder at a 45 degree angle.

In most martial arts moving outside of an opponent's lead leg and shoulder is still highly effective. Even though an opponent can still hit you if you move outside of their lead leg and shoulder, they are limited to only using a few strikes which makes it easier to defend.

Moving outside of an opponent's rear leg and shoulder, however, does not provide the same advantage as it does in boxing in most situations, with few exceptions such as when an opponent is pressed against the ropes or cage. Boxers are much less likely to be able to fight from both an orthodox and southpaw stance compared to most other martial arts.

As most martial arts employ kicking techniques, a martial artist in an orthodox stance using a rear leg kick will often find themselves in a southpaw stance, at least temporarily, if their kick misses. This forces most martial artists to develop at least a rudimentary understanding of how to fight from both orthodox and southpaw stance.

Even if a boxer is a proficient switch hitter, this is often not useful against an opponent moving to the outside of their rear leg and shoulder due to most boxers adopting the modern boxing stance which uses a heel to toe alignment. Martial artists often use L stances such as the Karate Renoji-dachi or the Taekwondo Niunja Seogi.

From an orthodox L stance this puts the lead foot facing the opponent and the rear foot at generally around a 90 degree angle. The martial artist faces in the same direction as their lead foot. If a martial artist is in an orthodox L stance and an opponent moves toward the outside of their rear leg and shoulder, the opponent must first evade strikes from the martial artist's power side. Even if the opponent can achieve this risky maneuver, the martial artist can just turn their head towards their right so that they are now facing their right foot putting them in a southpaw L stance with their lead foot facing the opponent. This not only nullifies their opponent's angular advantage, it puts the opponent in line with the martial artist's power hand again.

If a boxer in a modern orthodox stance turns their head from looking over their lead foot in the Traditional boxing stance to looking over their rear foot, they will not be in a modern southpaw boxing stance.

The boxer would require additional footwork to establish a modern southpaw boxing stance giving their opponent an opportunity to land strikes while they fix their stance. This makes triangle theory useful in boxing, but less useful in other martial arts.
