= List of karate terms =

Karate terms come almost entirely from Japanese. The following terms are not exclusive to karate. They appear during its study and practice, varying depending on style and school.

Karate terms include:

== A ==
Age-uke

== C ==
Chito-ryu

== D ==
Dan – Dachi - Dojo - Dojo kun

== E ==
Enorei

== G ==
Gi – Gedan barai - Goju-ryu

== H ==
Hachiji dachi - Hajime – Heian - Heiko-dachi - Heisoku-dachi

== K ==
Karate – Karate-ka - Kata – Keri - Kiai - Kihon – Kohai – Kumite – Kyū

== M ==
Mae-geri - Mokuso - Musubi-dachi

== O ==
Obi - Osu

== R ==
Rei

== S ==
Seiza - Senpai – Sensei – Shihan – Shotokan – Shuto-uchi - Shuto-uke - Sōke

== T ==
Tekki - Tsuki

== U ==
Uke

== W ==
Waza

== Y ==
Yame - Yoi

== Z ==
Zanshin - Zenkutsu-dachi
