= Gongbu =

Gongbu may refer to:

- Gongbu (mountaineer) (1933–2024), a Tibetan member of the 1960 Chinese Mount Everest Expedition
- romanized Korean pronunciation of Gongfu
- Gong Bu, a stance in Wushu and other Chinese martial arts
- Ministry of Works (imperial China), one of the Six Ministries from the Tang to the Qing
