= Kōkutsu dachi =

Kōkutsu dachi 後屈立

Kōkutsu dachi (後屈立) is a karate low stance that is a mirror image of zenkutsu dachi, where the rear leg is bent strongly at the knee and the front leg is either straight or slightly bent, depending on the style. The rear foot is turned 90 degrees to the side. The body is turned 90 degrees or more away, except for the head which looks to the front. Kokutsu-dachi is a great defensive stance because of the amount of energy stored in the rear leg, ready for a counter-attack.

== See also ==
- Karate stances
