= Kosa dachi =

Kosa dachi 交差立

Kosa dachi (交差立) is a karate middle weight stance. From moto-dachi, bring the back leg forward so that the back knee is tucked in to the back of the front knee, with only the toes and ball of the back foot on the floor. Depending on the style, the back foot may be directly behind the front foot, or out to the side of the front foot, so that the legs are crossed.

== See also ==
- Karate stances
