= Shiko dachi =

Shiko dachi 四股立

Shiko dachi (四股立) is a karate low stance similar to kiba dachi (horse stance), but where the toes face out at about 45 degrees. Knees point outward, and the stance is often lower than kiba dachi.

== See also ==
- Karate stances
