= Heisoku dachi =

Heisoku dachi 閉足立

Heisoku dachi (閉足立) is a karate stance where both feet are together. It is a high stance, meaning that the knees are bent very slightly. Heisoku dachi is usually a transitional stance, although it is also used as the ready stance in some kata.

== See also ==
- Karate stances
