= Musubi dachi =

Karate stance

Musubi dachi 結び立

Musubi-dachi (結び立) is a karate stance where both heels are together, with the toes open at about 45 degrees. It is a high stance, meaning that the knees are bent very slightly. Musubi-dachi is used to perform the formal respectful bow, rei (礼).

== See also ==
- Karate stances
