= Heikō dachi =

Heikō dachi 平行立

Heikō-dachi (平行立ち) is a karate stance where both feet are shoulder width apart, and their outer edges are parallel.It is a high stance, meaning that the knees are bent very slightly. Heikō-dachi is a common transitional stance in many kata.

== See also ==
- Karate stances
