= Wushu stances =

Concept in Chinese martial arts

Stances are a highly fundamental part of all Chinese martial arts. Wushu is characterized by low, wide stances designed for mobility and protection. Stability is another key concern of Chinese martial arts, and the wushu stances reflect this sensibility. There are five key stances utilized in both contemporary wushu and traditional wushu. Many others exist, and different styles of wushu prescribe a particular protocol for "correct" stance.

== Contemporary wushu stances ==
In contemporary wushu there are five basic stances: "Gong Bu" (bow stance), "Ma Bu" (horse stance), "Xie Bu" (rest stance), "Pu Bu" (flat stance), and "Xu Bu" (false stance).

=== Ma Bu ===
Ma Bu (馬步), known as "horse stance" or "horse-riding stance" qi ma bu (騎馬步; Qí Mǎ Bù), is a fundamental stance found in nearly all styles of wushu. In actual attack and defense, Ma Bu is sometimes viewed as a transitional stance, from which a practitioner may quickly switch to other stances. The stance typically begins with the feet apart slightly wider than shoulder-width. The feet are parallel, facing straight forward, and the knees are bent at 90 degrees making the thighs parallel to the ground. The torso sinks down as if suspended by a plumb line and the sacrum is curved forward and the coccyx is tucked in and under, thus flattening the arch in the lower back. Equal weight is given to each foot (50/50), making for a very stable stance. Ma Bu is frequently used for endurance conditioning and to build up knee and hip strength for added stability. As a means of testing such endurance, many kung fu masters require students to be able to hold Ma Bu for at least five minutes before being allowed to learn the forms of a style.

Different styles of kung fu often teach variations on the horse stance. For instance, in Fujian White Crane, the knees are bent inward and almost touching, unaligned with the toes.

=== Gong bu ===
Gong bu (弓步; Gōng Bù) Translated as "bow stance", Gong Bu is also known as "Deng Shan Bu" (登山步; Dēng Shān Bù; mountain-climbing stance) or "Gong jiang bu" (弓箭步; Gōng Jiàn Bù; bow and arrow stance). The lead foot is pointed straight ahead, with the lead leg bent at a 90-degree angle. The trailing foot is angled outward at a 45-degree angle, with the heel lined up with the heel of the leading foot. The trailing leg can be held slightly bent but is usually held straight. The result is a "lunging" pose. In southern styles, the toe is if it had stayed in Ma Bu; starting in Ma Bu, the hind leg steps forward and turns while the front leg stays in the same position. In northern styles, the toe points forward. The given weighting is 70% on the front foot and 30% on the rear.

In application, it is popularly used for attacking. The structure of the stance partially protects the groin and allows the martial artist to punch with greater power by driving the rear leg into the ground. Additionally, the rear leg can be quickly drawn forward for kicking attacks.

=== Fu Hu Bu ===
Fu Hu Bu (伏虎步 is translated as "subdue the tiger stance." Other names include "drop stance" or Pu Bu (仆步), "flat stance" or Ping Bu (平步), and "crouching stance" or Qu Qu Bu (屈曲步), among others. According to changquan master Yang Jwing-Ming, the stance was named after a martial artist named Wu Song, who slew a leaping tiger with the stance during the Song dynasty. In this position, the martial artist squats on one leg until the thigh is parallel to the ground and extends the other leg out to the side. Both feet are parallel and pointing forward, relative to the torso, and like Zuo Pan Bu, the practitioner faces the opponent with his/her side.

Versatile in application, Fu Hu Bu can be employed for both attack and defense. A primary application of this stance is defense against high or jumping kicks, as evidenced in the tai chi technique "Strike the Tiger." Baguazhang and tai chi forms also use the stance for low hand attacks, such as "Snake Creeps Down" from the Yang-style tai chi sequence. With Northern Praying Mantis, Fu Hu Bu is applied in Ba Bu Gan Chan (八步幹蟬), a leaping attack to the opponent's ankle with the foot. In traditional changquan forms, such as Yi Lu Mai Fu, the stance is used to pick up objects from ground for use as projectiles during combat.

As with Ma Bu, different styles assume Fu Hu Bu in differing ways.

=== Xuan Ji Bu ===
Xuan Ji Bu (玄機步) is rendered as the "false" or "tricky leg" stance, associated with kicking attacks. Popular alternative labels include the "empty stance" (Xū Bù, 虛步) or "cat stance" (Māo Bù, 貓步). Xuan Ji Bu is assumed by placing one's entire body weight on a single leg and extending the other leg in front to lightly touch the ground. Since the frontal leg has no weight placed on it, it can be used to launch fast kicks. It is sometimes used in conjunction with other stances for evasive actions.

=== Zuo Pan Bu ===
Zuo Pan Bu (坐盤步; literally sit; coil; step, but usually interpreted as "sitting on crossed legs stance") is also known as pan rao long bu (盤繞龍步; Pán Rào Lóng Bù) or "coiled dragon stance" as well as ban jia bu (半跏步; Bàn Jiā Bù) or "halfway sitting cross-legged stance" i.e. placing the feet with their outer edges adjacent to one another (which can only be accomplished by crossing your legs) but only lowering your buttocks halfway, never allowing them to actually touch the ground. It goes by a number of names in English too, as evidenced by contemporary wushu practice, such as "cross stance" (an obvious abbreviation of cross-legged stance) or "rest stance" (placing the knee of the rear leg on the calf of the front leg allows one to rest their weight very similar to actually sitting down). One way to assume the stance is by starting in Ma Bu, and then to pivot 180° in either direction (pivoting clockwise or anticlockwise determines which foot is in front) which ends with crouched legs yet maintaining the back straight and head up, the heel of the rear foot raised off the ground; this method of attaining the stance by means of twisting, is where the "coiled dragon" idea originates and the resulting cross-legged stance can be used for initiating attacks or for defending, while facing the opponent with one's side. Regardless of how you attain the posture, the crossed legs protect the groin from attack and prepare the practitioner for easily executing a side kick with the front foot.

More importantly, Zuo Pan Bu is the basis for Xie Bu (蟹步 literally "crab walking"), which is also called "clandestine steps" or Ai Bu (曖步/薆步). Crab walking is performed by alternating between Zuo Pan Bu and Ma Bu, moving in one direction only. For example, from Ma Bu step past the right foot with the left foot in front, in order to transition to Zuo Pan Bu and then open back to Ma Bu by stepping out to your right, with the right foot. Next, step past the right foot with the left foot going behind for the transition to Zuo Pan Bu and open back to Ma Bu, again using the right foot. All Ma Bu are the same and facing the front, while the Zuo Pan Bu alternate which foot is in front, thus helping to stabilize your movement. This example has you crab walking to your right; simply alternate which foot crosses and which foot opens in order to crab walk to your left. Another method of crab walking has you start in Ma Bu, then step behind for the transition to Zuo Pan Bu and pivot 180° to get back to Ma Bu, but now facing to the rear. Step behind again (this time it will be the opposite foot than you stepped with originally) to effect the transition to Zuo Pan Bu, and unwind your legs (i.e. pivot) to face the front in Ma Bu. Note that this method always steps behind in order to get to Zuo Pan Bu (alternating the legs that do the stepping on each iteration) and unwinds to go back to Ma Bu, alternately facing front or rear in the chain of steps. With either method of Xie Bu, the overall effect should be a rapid movement to one side. Nearly all combat applications of Zuo Pan Bu involve Xie Bu to some degree.

== Traditional wushu stances ==
The five stances—Ma Bu, Deng Shan Bu, Zuo Pan Bu, Fu Hu Bu, and Xuan Ji Bu—are the five basic stances taught in contemporary wushu, the sport established by the People's Republic of China. Contemporary wushu practitioners often perform stances such as Ma Bu and Deng Shan Bu lower than traditional wushu practitioners. In contrast, Northern traditional wushu masters usually teach higher, more practical versions of all five stances and a number of other stances, most notably Si-Liu Bu, Jin Ji Du Li, Tun Bu, and Qi Lin Bu.

=== Si-Liu Bu ===
Si-Liu Bu (四六步; Sì Liù Bù) is the "four-six stance," used heavily as a defensive posture. It is named for the fact that 40% of the weight is on the leading foot and 60% on the rear foot. The stance is somewhat similar to Deng Shan Bu, with the exception of the greater weight distribution over the rear leg. The lead foot is oriented slightly to its opposite side (left foot gravitates right; vice versa) and the rear foot is almost aligned with it. The rear knee is turned inward toward the groin and the front knee is bent.

Si-Liu Bu is a highly functional stance that often serves as a standard guard position in many styles of wushu; it has great utility, allowing the martial artist to initiate nearly any technique in this stance. From Si-Liu Bu, one may switch to any one of the other stances with minimal effort. The stance is highly mobile, used for swiftly stepping forward or backwards, "changing legs," or leaping to the other side of an opponent.

A number of jumping techniques are also executed from Si-Liu Bu, such as yue bu (躍步; Yuè Bù). Translated as "hop jump," Yue Bu is used to either advance or retreat over a short distance. It is essentially a large hop forwards or backwards, propelled by a thrust from the back or front leg, respectively. Because of the large spread of the legs, Si-Li Bu is an extremely stable stance.

=== Jin Ji Du Li ===
Jin Ji Du Li (金雞獨立), translated as "golden rooster stands on one leg," is popularly known as the crane stance, used heavily in karate. It is formed by raising one knee to its maximum height. The facing can be either to the front or the side, relative to the opponent. As with karate, Jin Ji Du Li is used as a platform for frontal kicks, as well as side kicks. It is also frequently employed defensively to deflect low to middle height kicks. Lastly, it is used in Northern styles for Tiao Bu ("jump step") and Dan Tiao ("single-jump"), two techniques of movement for advance or retreat.

=== Tun bu ===
Most clearly associated with Northern praying mantis, Tun Bu (吞步; Tūn Bù) is the "swallow stance," related to Fu Hu Bu. Like the former, it can be used to defend against jump attacks. It is formed by squatting on a single leg until the thigh is parallel to the ground and extending the other foot to touch the ground. Unlike Fu Hu Bu, the extended foot contacts the ground with only the heel and faces forward. This stance can be used to trap the opponent's foot to set up a shuai jiao technique. Punches and kicks, as well as jump kicks, can be executed easily from Tun Bu. Most praying mantis exponents assume a higher version of Tun Bu, in which the thigh is not parallel to the ground.

=== Qi Lin Bu ===
Qi Lin Bu (麒麟步) is the "unicorn stance," used primarily in Changquan and Northern Praying Mantis. It is similar in appearance to Zuo Pan Bu, with the exception that the frontal foot's toes point to the left or right. Also, the exponent's front faces the opponent. In changquan forms such as Shi Zi Tang (十字趟), it is employed as a low platform from which to execute uppercuts and front kicks. Furthermore, it is used evasively for straight-line retreats.
