= Kung fu (term) =

Term refers to Chinese martial arts

- Chinese: 功夫
Transcriptions
Standard Mandarin
- Hanyu Pinyin: gōngfu
- Bopomofo: ㄍㄨㄥ ㄈㄨ
- Wade–Giles: kung^{1}-fu
Wu
- Romanization: kon^{1} fu
Yue: Cantonese
- Jyutping: gung1 fu1
Southern Min
- Hokkien POJ: kang-hu
- Tâi-lô: kang-hu

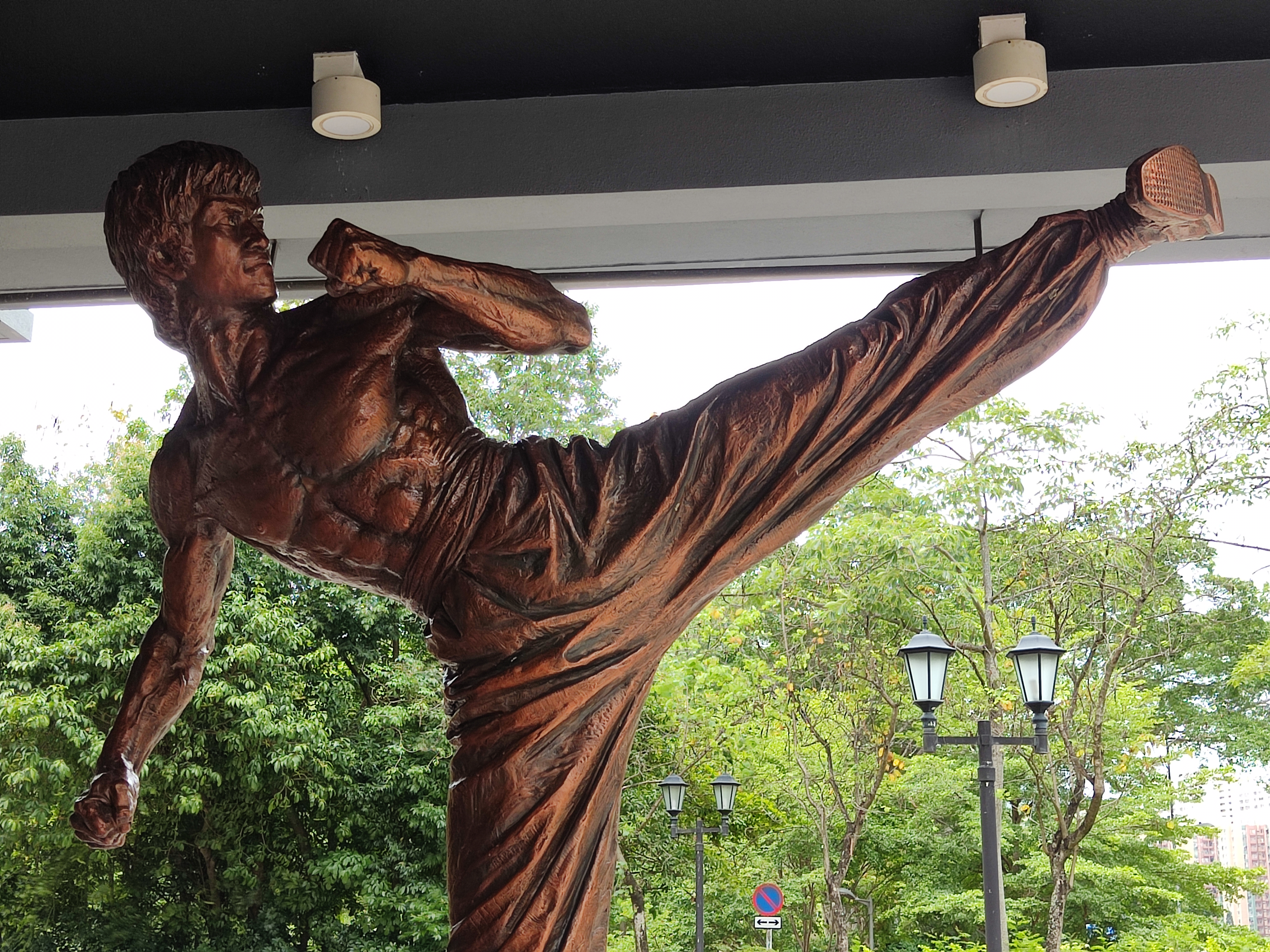
Bruce Lee is an iconic figure of kung fu.

Kung fu (/ˌkʌŋˈfuː/ or kungfu /ˌkʊŋˈfuː/; pinyin: gōngfu pronounced [kʊ́ŋfu]) refers to the Chinese martial arts, also called quanfa. In China, it refers to any study, learning, or practice that requires patience, energy and time to complete. In its original meaning, kung fu can refer to any discipline or skill achieved through hard work and practice, not necessarily martial arts, such as the discipline of tea making called the gongfu tea ceremony. The literal equivalent of "Chinese martial art" in Mandarin would be 中國武術 zhōngguó wǔshù.

There are many forms of kung fu such as Shaolin kung fu, Wing Chun, and tai chi, and they are practiced all over the world. Each form of kung fu has its own principles and techniques, but is best known for its trickery and quickness. It is only in the late twentieth century that this term was used in relation to Chinese martial arts by the Chinese community. The Oxford English Dictionary defines the term "kung-fu" as "a primarily unarmed Chinese martial art resembling karate" and attributes the first use of "kung fu" in print to Punch magazine in 1966. This illustrates how the meaning of this term has been changed in English. The origin of this change can be attributed to the misunderstanding or mistranslation of the term through movie subtitles or dubbing.

== History ==
The term gongfu in Chinese simply means "discipline;" it came to mean "martial arts" in English in the late nineteenth century, and the earliest English mention of "kung fu" dates to 1869.

In the 1960s, wuxia literature by Gu Long and Jin Yong invoked a mystical martial arts tradition called Yijin Jing gongfu. This was revised in Hong Kong cinema into kung fu films, which largely dropped the mysticism while retaining the idea of a martial arts lineage.

The Yijin Jing (Muscle/Tendon Changing Classic) is an apocryphal text dating to the Ming dynasty and falsely attributed to Bodhidharma. Bodhidharma was a legendary Chan Buddhist teacher, whose vague biography is constructed to legitimize Chan lineages rather than to describe a historical figure, and was never connected to martial arts before the Yijin Jing. The Yijin Jing describes Shaolin martial practices which were being newly developed during the Ming dynasty, with no earlier precedent.

According to Matsuda Ryuchi, historical texts written about the Shaolin martial arts before the 19th century, such as Cheng Zongyou's "Exposition of the Original Shaolin Staff Method" or Zhang Kongzhao's "Boxing Classic: Essential Boxing Methods," do not mention Bodhidharma or credit him with the creation of the Shaolin martial arts. The popular myth that Bodhidharma introduced martial arts to the Shaolin temple instead originates from the 1904–1907 serialization of the novel The Travels of Lao Ts'an in Illustrated Fiction Magazine.

== In popular culture ==
References to the concepts and use of Chinese martial arts can be found in popular culture. Historically, the influence of Chinese martial arts can be found in books and in the performance arts specific to Asia. Recently, those influences have extended to the movies and television that targets a much wider audience. As a result, Chinese martial arts have spread beyond their national roots and have a global appeal.

Martial arts play a prominent role in the literature genre known as wuxia. This type of fiction is based on Chinese concepts of chivalry, a separate martial arts society (武林; Wulin) and a central theme involving martial arts. Wuxia stories can be traced as far back as the 2nd and 3rd centuries BCE, becoming popular by the Tang dynasty and evolving into novel form by the Ming dynasty. This genre is still extremely popular in much of Asia and provides a major influence for the public perception of the martial arts.

Martial arts influences can also be found in dance, theater and especially Chinese opera, of which Beijing opera is one of the best-known examples. This popular form of drama dates back to the Tang dynasty and continues to be an example of Chinese culture. Some martial arts movements can be found in Chinese opera and some martial artists can be found as performers in Chinese operas.

In modern times, Chinese martial arts have spawned the genre of cinema known as the kung fu film. The films of Bruce Lee were instrumental in the initial burst of Chinese martial arts' popularity in the West in the 1970s, following a famous demonstration of "Chinese Boxing" to the US karate community the Long Beach International Karate Championships in 1964. Martial artists and actors such as Jackie Chan, Jet Li and Donnie Yen have continued the appeal of movies of this genre. Jackie Chan successfully brought a sense of humor in his fighting style into his movies. Martial arts films from China are often referred to as "kung fu movies" (功夫片), or "wire-fu" if extensive wire work is performed for special effects and are still best known as part of the tradition of kung fu theater (see also: wuxia, Hong Kong action cinema).

=== Influence on early hip-hop ===
In the 1970s, Bruce Lee was beginning to gain popularity in Hollywood for his martial arts movies. The fact that he was a non-white male who portrayed self-reliance and righteous self-discipline resonated with black audiences and made him an important figure in this community. With the release of Enter the Dragon in 1973, kung fu movies became a hit in America across all backgrounds; however, black audiences maintained the films' popularity well after the general public lost interest. Urban youth from every borough in New York City were attending movies in Manhattan's Times Square every night to watch the latest films.

Among these individuals were those coming from the Bronx where, during this time, hip-hop was beginning to take form. One of the pioneers responsible for the development of the foundational aspects of hip-hop was DJ Kool Herc, who began creating this new form of music by taking rhythmic breakdowns of songs and looping them. From the new music came a new form of dance known as b-boying or breakdancing, a style of street dance consisting of improvised acrobatic moves. The pioneers of this dance credit kung fu as one of its influences.

Moves such as the crouching low leg sweep and "up rocking" (standing combat moves) are influenced by choreographed kung fu fights. The dancers' ability to improvise these moves led way to battles, which were dance competitions between two dancers or crews judged on their creativity, skills and musicality. In a documentary, Crazy Legs, a member of breakdancing group Rock Steady Crew, described the breakdancing battle being like an old kung fu movie, "where the one kung fu master says something along the lines of 'hun your kung fu is good, but mine is better,' then a fight erupts."

== See also ==
- Wushu
- Neigong
- Qigong
- Chinese philosophy
- Tai chi
