= Hachiji dachi =

Karate stance

Hachiji dachi (八字立:はちじだち) is a stance used in karate. In English, hachiji roughly translates to "the character for eight," but in context means something more like "shaped like number eight." Note that this refers to the shape of the kanji for the number eight: 八, not the arabic numeral "8". Dachi (立:だち), the pronunciation of tachi (立:たち) when the word is second in a compound, translates to "stance," referring specifically to the body's position from the waist down. The term "hachiji dachi" is frequently used interchangeably with "shizentai" (自然体：しぜんたい), or "shizentai dachi", which translates to "natural stance" (literally, 'natural body,' or 'natural body stance'). In most styles, shizentai is identical to hachiji dachi.

== Description ==
The following is consistent with the teachings of shotokan karate. Different styles may vary slightly.

In hachiji dachi, the feet are shoulder width apart, toes pointing forward. The karateka stands upright, facing straight forward. While in hachiji dachi, the karateka is usually in a yoi (ready) position.

The yoi position is a preparatory position that gives a clear starting point for execution of other techniques. The main version of yoi means the arms are slightly moved forward, with fists closed. The fists point slightly to the centre line and are roughly half a shoulder width apart. The elbows should be bent very slightly.

There are many variations to the movements leading to the yoi position. Note that some kata have very different yoi positions. The basic Shotokan kata all start at the stance and with the yoi position described above. Examples of basic kata are Heian shodan, Heian nidan and Heian sandan.

Other yoi positions are found mostly in intermediate and advanced kata.

== See also ==
- Karate stances
