= Taekwondo stances =

The Korean martial art Taekwondo has several stances used for different activities. These stances are most commonly seen in the form competition of Hyeong, and are critical for balance, precision, and good technique in the martial art.

== Basic stances ==
There are two major organizations of Taekwondo: the World Taekwondo Federation and the International Taekwondo Federation. These two schools, while similar, show variance in their teachings of some of the stances. Individual schools within these larger umbrellas will also vary slightly in their teachings, but not to the large extent seen between WTF, ITF and GTF taekwondo.

Diagram	Korean	English	Description
	Moa Seogi	Closed Stance	Found in ITF taekwondo. This is mostly seen as a ready stance at the beginning and end of patterns, but can also be seen less frequently during pattern execution. Feet are placed together, and weight is distributed evenly between them.
	Charyot Seogi	Attention stance	In this stance, the arms and legs are straight and touching each other, with toes pointing forward. The arms are straight and held stiffly at one's side. In ITF style Taekwondo, the feet are put at a 45-degree angle as opposed to straight in WTF style. This is the stance that all bows come from.
	Naranhi Seogi	Ready stance Or: Command position	In this stance, the legs are straight, with toes pointing straight forward, feet shoulder width apart. The arms are held in front of the body, with closed fists and elbows slightly bent, hands about six inches away from the navel. This is the position that all poomsae forms start from, and return to. Not all ITF tul start and finish in this stance, but it is still used as a ready stance in the Chang Hon pattern set.
	Annun Seogi Jumchum Seogi	Sitting stance Or: horse riding stance; middle stance	In this stance, the legs are in a squat position, with feet far apart facing forward and knees bent. This stance can also be used as a stretch. The object is typically to keep the back straight while lowering the buttocks down to the ground with the legs spread keeping shins perpendicular to the floor.
	Natchoa seogi	Large sitting stance Or: Large horse riding stance	Larger and lower version than the sitting stance, distance of 2 steps, parallel feet and front-facing.
		Ap sogi	In this stance, one leg is forward, as per a common walking step. Both legs are straightened.
	Ap Kubi; Gunnun Seogi (ITF)	Front stance	In this stance, the legs are held one in front and to the side of the other, in a wide and deep pose with hips facing forward. The front leg is bent and the other is straightened. This is a very firm and steady stance, one of the first learned by beginners, and is often used in poomsae / tul. There is a variant of this stance called Nachuo Seogi or Low Stance which is One foot length longer (as illustrated). The stance can be either Full, Half or Reverse half facing. This variant is found in ITF taekwondo.
	Dwi Kubi; Niunja Seogi; Hoogulsagee	Back stance Or: L Stance; Ready stance	In this stance, one foot is in front of the other, with the back foot pointed 90 degrees perpendicular, and the front foot pointed straight. The majority of the body weight is placed on the back leg. There is a variant of this stance called Gojung Seogi or Fixed Stance which is One foot width longer, the weight distribution is 50-50, So when performing this stance one should just be able to see the toes of one's back foot over the knee. This variation is found in ITF taekwondo. All techniques in L-Stance can only be half facing.
	Bum Seogi; Dwitbal Seogi	Rear foot stance Or: Cat stance; Tiger stance; Forward Stance	In this stance, the legs are held bent and close together, with the back foot perpendicular to the body and the front foot straight and en pointe. This stance is found in the higher level forms.

== Different stances ==
=== Fighting stance ===
This stance varies with the martial art and practitioner, but is the basic all-purpose stance used in sparring and combat. Common features across the arts include turning the body to the side to present a smaller target, slightly bent knees for balance and agility, feet about two shoulder widths apart, and hands up, protecting the head. In an art relying heavily on kicks, the body's mass is usually shifted slightly to the back leg, making the front leg easier to lift and increasing the speed of kicks. Regardless of the exact stance, this is the most familiar stance for a martial artist. All other stances, blocks, and attacks flow from this stance. Interestingly enough this often results in an increased power level.

=== Diagonal stance ===
Sasun Seogi. Found in ITF taekwondo. This stance is very similar to the sitting stance, however one foot will be slightly more forward than the other.

=== Crouched stance ===
Oguryo Seogi. Found in ITF taekwondo. In this stance, the feet are spread wide apart, one foot slightly in front of the other. The knees are bent inward.

== See also ==
- Karate stances
