= Karate stances =

Karate has many different stances, each used for different types of power and movement. In Japanese the general term is tachi (立ち) changed to dachi when used as a suffix. Some stances focus more on mobility than stability, and vice verse.

== High stances ==
In all these stances the knees are bent very slightly. There are no stances where weight rests on a leg with a completely straight knee.

- Heisoku-dachi (閉足立, Feet together stance)
  Feet together. This is usually a transitional stance, although it is used as the ready stance in some kata.
- Musubi-dachi (結び立, Joining stance)
  Heels together, toes open at about 45 degrees. This stance is used to perform the formal respectful bow, rei (礼).
- Musubi-dachi-heiko (結び立-平行)
  From musubi-dachi, open heels until both outer edges of feet are parallel. Some styles don't distinguish this stance from heiko-dachi.
- Hachiji-dachi (八字立, natural stance, literally "stand like the character 八")
  The feet are shoulder width apart, toes open at 45 degrees. Sometimes this stance is called soto-hachiji-dachi (外八字立). This is the basic ready stance in Karate.
- Uchi hachiji-dachi (内八字立, literally "stand like the upside-down character 八")
  The feet are shoulder width apart, toes facing inwards at 30-45 degrees, knees tense. This stance is used in some formal exercises, for example the tsundome. Also called Chun'be or Naifanchin-dachi.
- Heikō-dachi (平行立, parallel stance)
  The feet are shoulder width apart, and their outer edges are parallel. This is a common transitional stance in many kata.
- Seisan-dachi (十三立, universal stance)
  The feet are shoulder width apart, as in Heiko-dachi, but one foot is forward to where the heel is parallel with the big toe of the back foot.

=== Sidewise high stances ===
- Renoji-dachi (レの字立, stand like the character レ)
  Feet are at the shoulder width. The foot in the front is fully frontal (toes facing forward), the rear foot is turned 90 degrees out, and is positioned in such a way that if the front foot is brought back, its heel will touch the heel of the rear foot. Thus the foot print is shaped like the character レ (or letter L). The weight is kept 70% on the rear foot.
- Teiji-dachi (丁字立, stand like the character 丁)
  Similar to renoji-dachi, but if the front foot is brought back, its heel will touch the middle of the rear foot, thus the foot print is shaped like the character 丁 (or letter T).
- Chokusen-seisan-dachi (直線十三立, straight line universal stance)
  Like the forward-facing Seisan-dachi, the feet are on the same angle and aligned the same, but they are moved 25-30 degrees to form a straight line forward but keeping the upper body in the same direction. This stance is quite often used for its fast turning speed.

=== Special high stances ===
- Sagi-ashi-dachi (鷺足立 Heron-foot stance) also known as Tsuru-ashi-dachi (鶴足立 Crane-foot stance)
  This is the stance on one leg, where the other leg is raised and bent so that its foot touches the knee of the base leg. The exact form of contact between the foot and the knee depends on the style or even on the particular version of the kata where this stance is used. For example, different versions of the kata rōhai use different sagi ashi dachi

== Middle height stances ==
=== Middle height front stances ===
- Naihanchi-dachi (内歩進立)
  The feet are wider than the shoulder width, with their outer edges parallel. Legs and buttocks should be tensed upwards, while keeping the weight low and the knees bent inwards. This stance has strong tension in the legs and is the basis of the kata Naihanchi.
- Sanchin-dachi (三戦立 Three Battles stance)
  The stance is fixed and tensed in the same way as naihanchin-dachi. It can be described as uchi-hachiji-dachi with one foot moved forward until the toes of the rear foot are on the same horizontal line as the heel of the front foot. This powerful stance is serves as the foundational stance for all of Uechi-ryū kata, and it is used in the multitude of kata attributed to Kanryo Higashionna, from Sanchin to Suparimpei. Many advanced breathing techniques are exercised in this stance.
- Hangetsu-dachi (半月立, Halfmoon stance)
  A version of sanchin used in some karate styles, particularly Shotokan. This stance is longer than sanchin-dachi, but retains the same tension and inward rotation of the knees. It is the basis of the kata Hangetsu.
- Moto-dachi (基立, Foundational stance)
  The stance is shin length and around two fist widths wide, with both legs slightly bent, the front foot facing straight forward and the back foot pointed outward at about 20-30 degrees. The body should be squarely forward unless a half-turn han-mi is applied. The basic ready stance for kumite is Moto-dachi.
- Kosa-dachi (交差立, Crossing stance)
  From Moto-dachi, bring the back leg forward so that the back knee is tucked in to the back of the front knee, with only the toes and ball of the back foot on the floor. Depending on the style, the back foot may be directly behind the front foot, or out to the side of the front foot, so that the legs are crossed.
- Han Zenkutsu-dachi (半前屈立, half zenkutsu), also known as Sho Zenkutsu-dachi (小前屈立, short zenkutsu)
  Shortened and raised zenkutsu-dachi, this stance is slightly lower than moto-dachi. The rear leg is straight at the knee just like in the regular (low) zenkutsu-dachi. This stance is sometimes seen in kata, for example in Matsukaze.
- Han-Kokutsu-dachi (半後屈立, half kokutsu), also known as Sho Kokutsu-dachi (小後屈立, short kokutsu)
  Shortened and raised kokutsu-dachi.

== Low stances ==
The height of all these stances is, ideally, exactly the same, so that the transitions from zenkutsu to kokutsu (defense) or kokutsu to zenkutsu (attack) happen without loss of energy which would be necessary to move the body's center of mass up and down.

=== Low frontal stances ===
- Kiba-dachi (騎馬立, horse stance or rider stance)
  Feet are parallel and wide, weight is central and low, with the back straight and the knees and feet pointing slightly inwards. This stance is not used in all styles of karate because of strong tension that it requires, instead it is often replaced by Shiko-dachi.
- Shiko-dachi (四股立, square stance, often called horse stance where kiba-dachi is not used)
  Similar to Kiba-dachi but the toes face out at about 45 degrees. Knees point outward, and stance is often lower than Kiba-dachi.
- Zenkutsu-dachi (前屈立, forward stance)
  This is a long frontal stance where the weight is mostly on the front leg. It has exactly the same height as shiko-dachi, but the rear leg is completely straight at the knee and extended back. The front foot is placed frontal (toes facing forward), the rear foot is turned out 30 degrees, just like Moto-dachi, but never 90 degrees as seems natural to new practitioners because this precludes any forward motion. The heel of the rear foot rests on the ground. Zenkutsu-dachi is one of the most common stances in kata.
- Nekoashi-dachi (猫足立, cat foot stance)
  All weight rests on the back leg, which is bent at the knee. The rear foot is turned at about 20-30 degrees out and the knee sits at the same angle. Only the toes of the front foot rest on the ground, positioned in front of the back heel at about the same distance as the front foot of moto-dachi. There is no weight on the front foot, and there is no bent in the ankle joint - front knee, front shin, and the rise of the foot (but not the toes) form a single line, vertical in Shitō-ryū, tilted in Shotokan.
- Iaigoshi-dachi (居合腰立, Kneeling stance)
  Kneeling on the rear leg. Distance from back foot to front foot is one shank length plus fist length. Stance is one fist width wide.

=== Low sidewise stances ===
- Fudō-dachi (不動立, unshakable stance) also called Sōchin-dachi (壯鎭立) after kata Sōchin
  The body is positioned similar to shiko-dachi turned either 45 or 90 degrees to the side, except for the head which still looks forward. The front foot moves one foot-length forward, increasing stability and making it possible to perform a strong attack with the rear foot.
- Kōkutsu-dachi (後屈立, back long stance)
  This is a mirror image of zenkutsu-dachi, where the rear leg is bent strongly at the knee and the front leg is either straight or slightly bent, depending on the style. The rear foot is turned 90 degrees to the side. The body is turned 90 degrees or more away, except for the head which looks to the front. Kokutsu-dachi is a great defensive stance because of the amount of energy stored in the rear leg, ready for a counter-attack.
- Sōkutsu-dachi (側屈立, side long stance)
  Often conflated with kōkutsu-dachi, this is a variant of kōkutsu where the head faces the direction perpendicular to the line on which the feet stand.

== Gallery ==
Heisoku dachi 閉足立

Musubi dachi 結び立

Heikō dachi 平行立

Hachiji dachi 八字立

Kiba dachi 騎馬立

Shiko dachi 四股立

Zenkutsu dachi 前屈立

Kōkutsu dachi 後屈立

Sanchin dachi 三戦立

Hangetsu dachi 半月立

Neko ashi dachi 猫足立

Kosa dachi 交差立ち

== See also ==
- Taekwondo stances
