= Horse stance =

Posture in Asian martial arts

Horse Stance
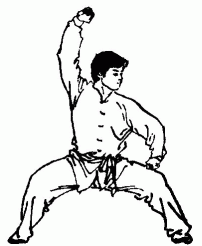
- A horse stance in wushu

Chinese name
- Traditional Chinese: 馬步
Transcriptions

Korean name
- Hangul: 안운서기

Japanese name
- Kanji: 騎馬立ち

The horse stance is a common posture in Asian martial arts. It is called mǎbù (馬步) in Chinese, kiba-dachi (騎馬立ち) (or shiko-dachi (四股立)) in Japanese, and juchum seogi (주춤 서기) or annun seogi (lit. sitting stance) in Korean.

This stance can be integrated into fighting or during exercises and forms. It is most commonly used for practicing punches or to strengthen the legs and back. The modified form of horse stance, in which heels are raised, is a fighting stance in International Karate Tournaments. The Chinese form of horse stance is a fighting stance which changes into front stance while using hip rotation to develop punching force.

== Chinese martial arts ==
In Kung Fu, the Ma Bu (horse stance) is often used as a base for throwing an opponent over your front leg.

In contrast to the traditional view that the horse stance develops rooting for punching power or muscle strength, a competing theory holds that it serves as a stable base for applying throwing techniques.

To initiate the throw, you may lift the opponent’s lead arm to slip underneath it, as shown in the image on the right. More commonly, you would pull their arm straight down toward your hip, binding the opponent's upper body to yours, while stepping behind them. If you have already stepped behind the opponent’s front leg during the preceding technique, you may simply remain standing.

Your front leg becomes the pivot point. With your own lead arm, you guide, push, punch, elbow the opponent's upper body over your extended front leg. Because the throw relies on breaking their structure backward and sideways, you must always stand very deep behind the opponent—otherwise the leverage is not enough and the throw becomes unstable.

In this sense, the Kung Fu "stance" ma bu is not a static posture but a step that occupies the opponent's front leg.

Source "kungfu-wiki.com"

=== Northern styles ===
The ideal horse stance in most northern Chinese martial arts (such as Mizongquan and Chaquan) has the feet pointed forward, thighs parallel to the floor, with the buttocks pushed out, and the back "arched up" to keep the upper body from leaning forward. The emphasis on this latter point will vary from school to school as some schools of Long Fist, such as Taizu and Bajiquan, will opt for the hips forward, with the buttocks "tucked in."

In Northern Shaolin, the distance between the feet is approximately two shoulder widths apart.

=== Southern Shaolin ===
Southern Chinese martial arts usually pronounce horse stance by its Cantonese pronunciation of "Sei Ping Ma". In Southern Shaolin, a wide horse stance is assumed as if riding a horse. Such low postures strengthen the legs of the practitioner. The horse stance in southern Chinese systems is commonly done with the thighs parallel to the ground and the toes pointing forward or angled slightly out.

Southern Chinese styles (such as Hung Gar) are known for their deep and wide horse stance.

See also Wushu Stances for more information.

== Japanese martial arts ==
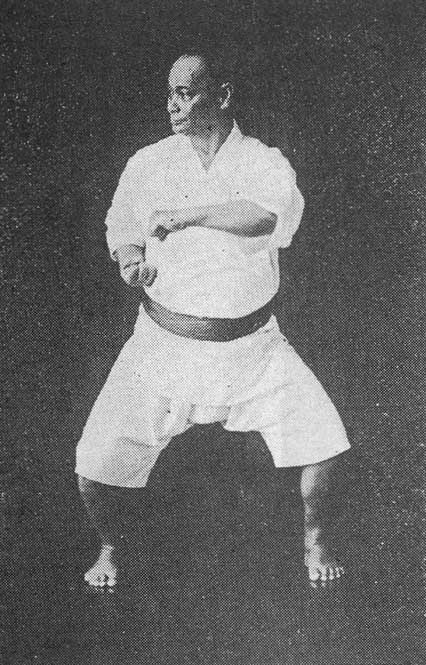
A karate horse stance

In Japanese martial arts, the horse stance (kiba-dachi) has many minor variations between individual schools, including the distance between the feet, and the height of the stance. One constant feature is that the feet must be parallel to each other.

The horse stance differs from the straddle stance (四股立ち, shiko-dachi), widely used in sumo, in which the feet point outward at 45 degrees rather than being parallel.

== Indian martial arts ==
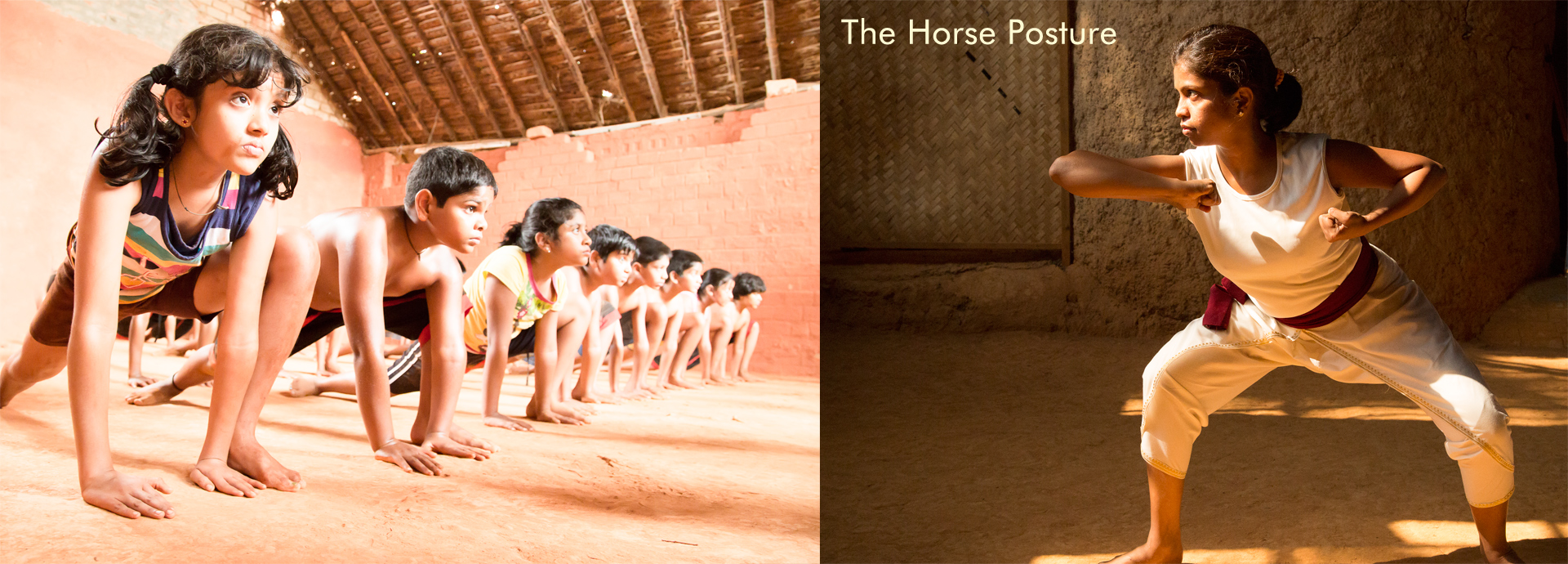
Horse stance in Indian martial arts

What is referred to as the horse stance in south Indian martial arts is very different from the posture of the same name in other Asian fighting styles. Known in Malayalam as aswa vadivu or ashwa vadivu, it imitates the horse itself rather than the rider. In kalaripayat, the horse stance has the hind leg stretched completely backward while the knee of the front leg is bent ninety degrees. The horse stance is the main posture of the Shiva form and is related to the virabhadrasana (warrior pose) in yoga.

== See also ==
- Squatting position
