= Stance (martial arts) =

Position in martial arts

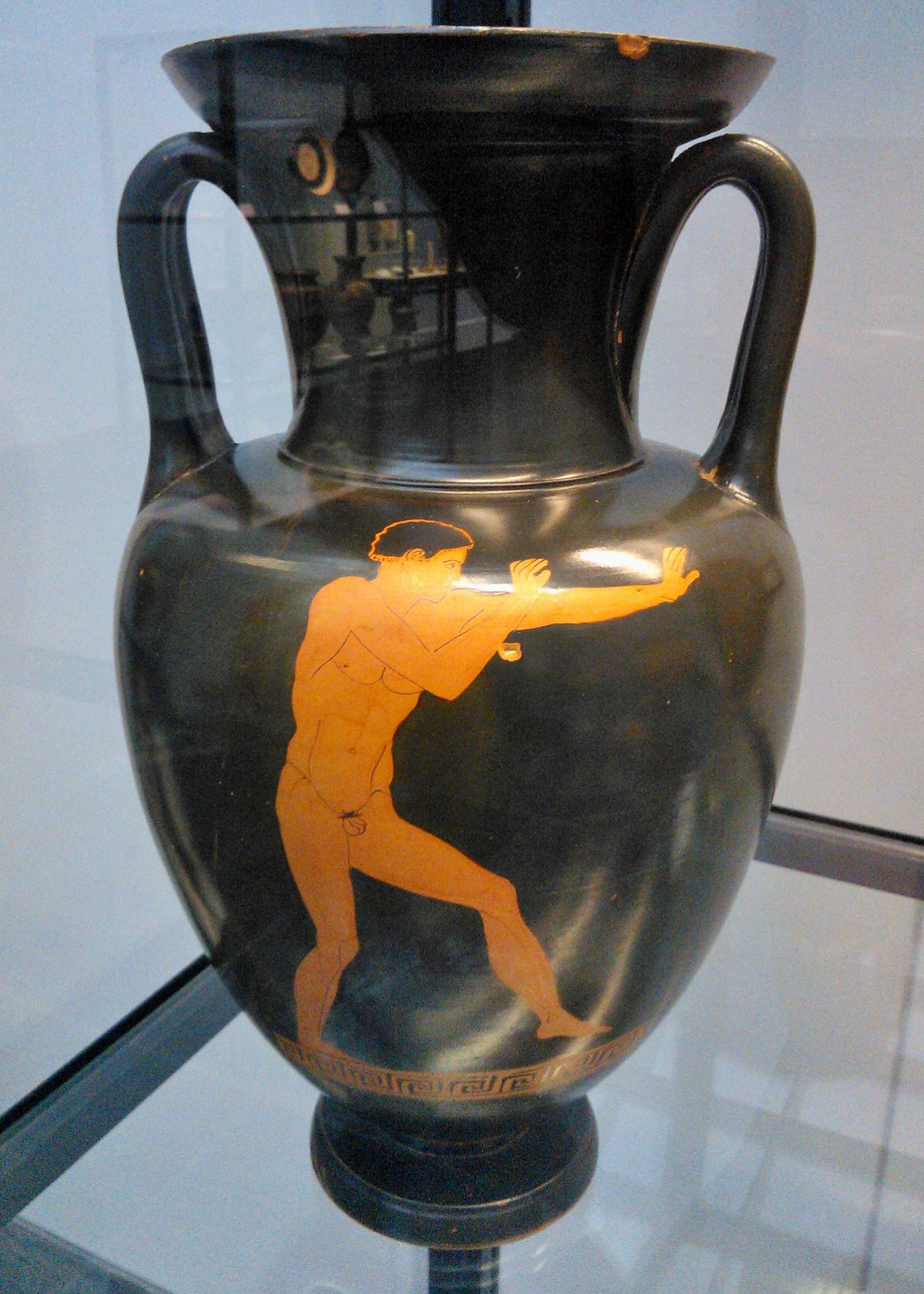
Pankratiast in fighting stance, Ancient Greek red-figure amphora, 440 BC.

In martial arts, stances are the distribution, foot orientation and body positions (particularly the legs and torso) adopted when attacking, defending, advancing, or retreating. In many Asian martial arts, the most widely used stance is a shallow standing squat. This position is generally employed as it is a neutral and agile position from which both attacks and defences may be launched. It provides for the delivery of force when attacking and stability when defending.

Stances vary greatly in their application and form. In general, stances may be described in a number of ways:

== Wide or narrow ==
This refers to the lateral distance between the lead and rear foot. In general, wide, also known as square, stances are more stable than narrow stances. However, narrow, also known as bladed, stances leave one less vulnerable to groin attacks and expose a smaller portion of the body to an opponent.

== Long or short ==
This refers to the distance from the lead foot to the rear foot. Short stances make the user very agile, but can be unstable. Long stances are very stable, but this is at the expense of agility. Most stances are approximately as wide as the shoulders, though there is significant variation between styles.

== High or low ==
This refers to the bend in the knees and height relative to a normal standing position. Low stances are very powerful and assist delivery of power through the body to either the arms or the legs. High stances are more mobile and allow one to reposition rapidly.

== Weighted or unweighted ==
Unweighted stances are those where half of one's bodyweight is on each foot. Forward-weighted or backward-weighted stances place most of body weight on either the rear or the lead foot, respectively. Forward-weighted stances are more aggressive, allowing stronger punches and kicks because one's weight is already forward. Alternatively, backward-weighted stances are more defensive, allowing one to fall back more easily.

Most disciplines have one major stance that they regularly employ (generally from a standard guard position), and many variations of this standard stance which incorporate various combinations of open/closed, long/short, high/low or weighted/unweighted. Typically, martial arts do not teach fighting stances until students have developed other basic skills.

== Orthodox or southpaw ==
Orthodox stance refers to a stance where the left leg, and usually the left arm, is forward. Southpaw stance refers to a stance where the right leg, and usually the right arm, is forward.

== Open or closed ==
Open stance refers to when one fighter is in an orthodox stance and the other is in a southpaw stance. Closed stance refers to when both fighters are in orthodox stances or both fighters are in southpaw stances.

== Basic fighting stances ==
English boxing, Thai boxing
- 2 feet aligned, somewhat spaced apart
- standing position
Karate, Wushu, Silat
- right foot in front, left foot facing left or left foot in front, right foot facing right
- crouching position

== Conceptualising stances and footwork in the martial arts ==
It is very common in the martial arts to describe stances and the transitions between them in terms of triangles, squares and circles. This is often done in conjunction with attempts to gain positional advantage or gain control of the balance of an opponent. In addition, in many styles, specific stances are adopted either for attack or for defence. In addition, many stances are used purely for training, or as progressions to more advanced and practical stances learnt later on.

"Stances are the position from which all attacking and defensive moves begin. They combine balance, defence and readiness. A good basic stance is essential".

== Stance types ==
- Forward stance
- Horse stance
- Ginga (capoeira)
- Natural stance (how one stands on his/her feet)

== See also ==
- Karate stances
