= Front stance =

- Typical foot placement for a front stance

Korean name
- Hangul: 앞 굽이
Transcriptions
- Revised Romanization: ap gubi
- McCune–Reischauer: ap kubi

Japanese name
- Kanji: 前屈立ち
- Hiragana: ぜんくつだち
Transcriptions
- Revised Hepburn: zenkutsu-dachi
- Kunrei-shiki: zenkutu-dati

Front stance, sometimes also called forward leaning stance or forward stance, is a basic stance used in various Asian martial arts. Although the specifics of the stance vary by style, overall it is visually similar to a moderate lunge, with the forward leg bent at the knee, and the rear leg straight, while the hips and shoulders remain squarely facing forward. The purpose of the stance is to teach musculo-skeletal alignment that adds as much mass of the earth to a strike as possible. The stance allows a great deal of power generation forward, but very little in any other direction.

== Japanese martial arts ==
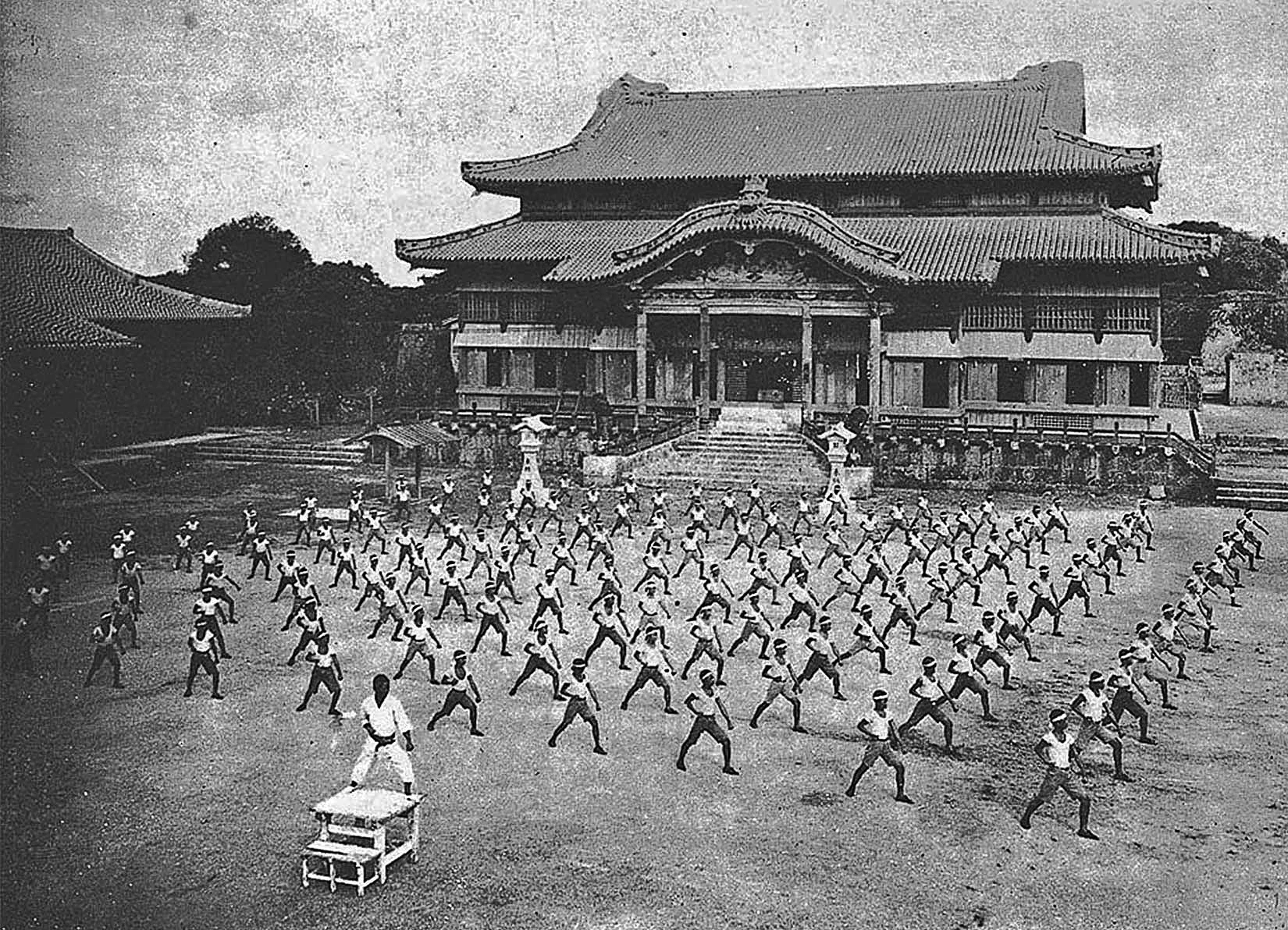
Karate students training in front stance at Shuri Castle, c.1938

In Japanese martial arts, the front stance (前屈立ち, zenkutsu-dachi) is primarily practiced in karate and its variants. Some variations include the version practiced by Shotokan, where students generally place their feet at a longer depth, while Isshin-ryū students place their feet shoulder width, but with much shallower length. Other variations are also practiced.

The purpose of the front stance is to provide stability while projecting the body weight forwards, such as when punching. The straight rear leg pushes the center of gravity forwards, ensuring the full body weight is behind the strike, while the bent front leg supports the body weight. The front stance can be used when moving forwards or backwards, as long as the body weight or center of gravity is projected forwards. The back stance is by contrast used when the body weight or center of gravity is positioned on the rear leg, such as when leaning backwards to avoid an attack.

== Korean martial arts ==
The front stance is primarily practiced by students of taekwondo, where it is called ap kubi.

Students of Tang Soo Do or Kong Soo Do call this stance chun gul chase. Depending on the school's lineage, it will either be very similar to a Shotokan deep and long stance (Most Moo Duk Kwan or Chung Do Kwan lineage schools), or else appear more similar to a Shudokan or Renbukai stance, which is of shorter length (Most Jido Kwan, Han Moo Kwan or Chang Moo Kwan schools).
