= Shōrin-ryū Kishaba Juku =

Style of karate

- Kishaba Juku patch
- Also known as: Kishaba Juku
- Date founded: February 1, 1998
- Country of origin: Okinawa, Japan
- Founder: Chokei Kishaba
- Current head: Katsuhiko Shinzato
- Arts taught: Karate, Kobudō
- Ancestor schools: Shuri-te, Tomari-te, Matsubayashi-ryū
- Practitioners: Katsuhiko Shinzato
- Official website: kishabajuku.okinawa

Okinawa Karate-Dō Shōrin-ryū Kishaba Juku, also called, familiarly, Kishaba Juku, is a private academy of the Matsubayashi-ryu style of Okinawan Karate. The Kishaba Juku was officially founded on February 1, 1998, but had been in existence as an informal karate study group since the late 1970s.

Chokei Kishaba, the founding Juku Cho (head of the academy), was a student of Hohan Sōken, Shoshin Nagamine and Seigi Nakamura.

== Academy ==
After the passing of Kishaba in 2000, Katsuhiko Shinzato became the Juku Cho. Shinzato's dojo is located in Yonabaru, Okinawa, in Japan.

Dojos affiliated with the Kishaba Juku are located in Japan, the United States, France, Germany and Israel. Within the United States there are dojos in California, Connecticut, Florida, Hawaii, Illinois, Nebraska, New Jersey, New York, Oregon, and Virginia.

== Training methodology ==
The training methodology developed by the Kishaba Juku was profoundly influenced by the natural ability of Seigi Nakamura. For many years Kishaba, Shinzato and their students worked towards reverse-engineering Nakamura's natural movement. They did this because what appeared natural and effortless to Nakamura was difficult to teach and it was important to preserve that ability for posterity.

They developed a distinct training methodology focussed on body mechanics to make it easier to learn the elementary components of each move. This method of training has made Shorin-ryu Kishaba Juku distinctive and easily identifiable.

George Donahue of Fighting Arts magazine observed:

"Nakamura preferred to call the "hidden" moves "intermediary" moves, because they occur between the obvious-to-the-eye basic moves, and because they are not exotic or special, but are just a little harder to catch. The key to catching them, by the way, is to watch the koshi (pelvic carriage) and hikite (pulling hand) carefully to penetrate the sleight of hand."

The Kishaba Juku sai kata, Kishaba No Sai, was named after Kishaba and is distinct to Kishaba Juku.

== Okinawan Kobudō legacy ==
Kishaba Juku also has a Yamane Ryu Bōjutsu legacy since Kishaba's younger brother, Chogi Kishaba, was a student of, Masami Chinen, Sanda Chinen's son, and Chinen Pechin's grandson. Shinzato studied Bōjutsu with Chogi Kishaba.

== See also ==
- Okinawan martial arts
