= Shōgen-ryū =

Style of karate

Okinawa Shōgen-ryū Karate-Dō
- Also known as: Shōgen-ryū
- Date founded: 1999
- Country of origin: Okinawa, Japan
- Founder: Taba Kensei
- Current head: Kiyomasa Maeda
- Arts taught: Karate, Kobudō
- Ancestor schools: Shuri-te, Tomari-te, Matsubayashi-ryū
- Practitioners: Taba Kensei, Kiyomasa Maeda, Takeshi Tamaki, Masahiko Tokashiki, K.P. Johnson, Chikara Shinjo, Toshihiko Tamashiro

Okinawa Shōgen-ryū Karate-Dō, also called, familiarly, Shōgen-ryū, is an offshoot of the Matsubayashi-ryu style of Okinawan Karate. Shogen Ryu was officially founded in 1999 by Taba Kensei after stepping down as the first President of the World Matsubayashi-ryu Karate-Do Association (WMKA).

== History ==
In 1999 after stepping down as the first president of the World Matsubayashi-ryu Karate-Do Association (WMKA) Taba Kensei would found Shōgen-ryū. Shōgen is made up of two kanji Sho (昭) in honor of his primary karate teacher Shōshin Nagamine and Gen (源) meaning a return to origin which together gives the meaning returning to the roots of Shoshin's karate. Taba would remain the head of Okinawa Shogen-Ryu Karate-Do Association, the official organization for Shōgen-ryū, until his death 7 July, 2012. Following his passing one of his primary students Kiyomasa Maeda would be recognized as the new head of the association. The World Headquarters for the Okinawa Shogen-Ryu Karate-Do Association is located in Itoman, Okinawa, Japan. Recognised international branches are also present in Canada, Europe and India.

== Training methodology ==
Shōgen-ryū, created by Taba Kensei, follows many of the principles and kata of Matsubayashi ryu, but the mechanics and bunkai of Taba. Taba sensei greatly emphasized the use of koshi (hip) in generating power, he also changed several of the kata to better fit Ikken hissatsu which is best demonstrated in his version of wankan kata. This emphasis has led to the styles division from Matasubayashi ryu and its practice to this day.

== Kata ==
Kata are sets of moves in Karate and are considered the most important part of the Shōgen-ryū style. Shōgen-ryū has 18 kata in the system, namely:

- Fukyugata series (1-2)
- Pinan series (1-5)
- Naihanchi series (1-3)
- Ananku
- Wankan
  - Taba Wankan
- Rōhai
- Wanshu
- Passai
- Gojūshiho
- Chintō
- Kusanku

== Okinawan Kobudō legacy ==
Shōgen-ryū also has a Yamane Ryu Bōjutsu legacy since some of Taba's students studied Bōjutsu with Chogi Kishaba, who was a student of, Masami Chinen, Sanda Chinen's son, and Chinen Pechin's grandson. Yamane-ryu practice is also encouraged in many Shōgen-ryū dojos.

== See also ==
- Okinawan martial arts
- Matsubayashi-ryū
- Shōrin-ryū
- Karate
