= Dōjō kun =

Japanese martial arts term literally meaning (training hall) rules

Dōjō kun (道場訓) is a Japanese martial arts term literally meaning "training hall rules." They are generally posted at the entrance to a dōjō or at the "front" of the dōjō (shomen) and outline behaviour expected and disallowed. In some styles of martial arts they are recited at the end of a class.

== Shotokan Karate ==
Generally credited to Gichin Funakoshi (but rumoured to have been created by Kanga Sakukawa, an 18th-century Okinawan karate proponent) the Shotokan Karate dōjō kun serves as a set of five guiding principles, recited at the end of each training session in most styles, intended to frame the practice within an ethical context.

The five rules are:

一、人格完成に努むること

hitotsu, jinkaku kansei ni tsutomuru koto
jinkaku = personality, kansei = complete (perfect), ni = to, tsutomuru = endeavour

一、誠の道を守ること

hitotsu, makoto no michi wo mamoru koto
makoto = truth, no = 's, michi = path, wo = with respect to that, mamoru = defend

一、努力の精神を養うこと

hitotsu, doryoku no seishin wo yashinau koto
doryoku = effort, no = ’s, seishin = spirit, wo = with respect to that, yashinau = cultivate

一、礼儀を重んずること

hitotsu, reigi wo omonzuru koto
reigi = courtesy, wo = with respect to that, omonzuru = honour

一、血気の勇を戒むること

hitotsu, kekki no yū wo imashimuru koto
kekki = vigor (impetuousness), no = of, yu = courage, wo = with respect to that, imashimuru = refrain

The word Hitotsu (一つ) means "one" or "first" and is prepended to each rule to place it at the same level of importance as the others. The word koto (こと) which ends each rule means "thing" and is used as a conjunction between rules. Also, the Japanese no indicates possessiveness and is equivalent to the English 's e.g. doryoku no seishin = effort's spirit = the spirit of effort. wo (and wa) is used to indicate that the preceding element is the subject of the sentence e.g. X wo Y = with respect to X, Y. Finally, the word imashimuru seems archaic, however, it contains the radical 戒 that means admonition and is usually translated as refrain.

=== Interpretations ===
Varying translations and interpretations of the dōjō kun exist. Each translation differs in the terms used and the interpretations vary regarding the philosophical depth, meaning, and intention.

The population of English karate practitioners has pushed one form of the translation into being the most widely accepted outside Japan. Generally, the English translation states:

- Each person must strive for the completion and perfection of one's character
- Each person must be faithful and protect the way of truth
- Each person must endeavor (fostering the spirit of effort)
- Each person must respect others and the rules of etiquette
- Each person must refrain from hot blooded behavior (guard against impetuous courage)

A more terse translation is used by the ISKF, IKA and JKA:

- Strive for completion of character (or Seek perfection of character)
- Be Faithful
- Endeavor
- Respect others
- Refrain from violent behavior

An even more terse translation used in some clubs (often repeated towards the end of class by the students)

- Character
- Sincerity
- Effort
- Etiquette
- Self-Control

The dōjō kun also appears in various other martial arts styles, with alterations according to the general precepts of that style.

=== Origin ===
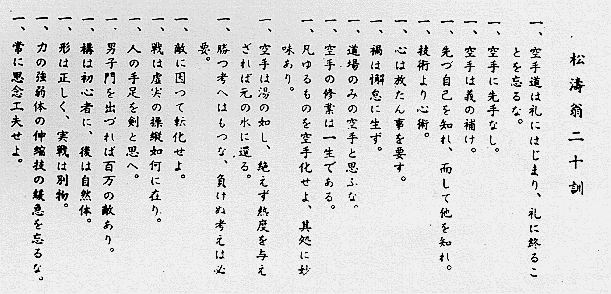
Calligraphy of the Nijū kun

The Shotokan Dōjō Kun derived from Gichin Funakoshi's Twenty Guiding Principles of Shotokan, or nijū kun. It is used by many as a condensed form of Sensei Funakoshi's 20 precepts.

== Goju Ryu ==
Depending on your variant of Goju Ryu there are alternative Dōjō Kun.

The leading "Hitotsu" roughly means "number one", or "first"—meaning that while they are generally used in the order listed, no one item is more important than another.

The Jundokan Dojo Kun:

謙虚にして礼儀を重んぜよ ‘kenkyo ni shite reigi wo omonzeyo’

体力に応じて適度に修行せよ ‘tairyoku ni ōjite tekido ni shugyō seyo’

真剣に工夫研究せよ ‘shinken ni kufū kenkyū seyo’

沈着平静にして敏捷自在なれ ‘chinchaku heisei ni shite binshō jizai nare’

摂生を重んぜよ ‘sessei wo omonzeyo’

質素な生活をせよ ‘shisso na seikatsu wo seyo'

我心せぬこと ‘gashin senu koto’

撓まず屈せず修行を永続せよ ‘tawamazu kussezu shugyō wo eizoku seyo’

For the Okinawan Goju Ryu of Eiichi Miyazato or Teruo Chinen, as published on the walls of their dōjō, the Dōjō Kun consists of eight rules and are in English as follows:

- Hitotsu: Be humble and polite.
- Hitotsu: Train considering your physical strength
- Hitotsu: Practice earnestly with creativity.
- Hitotsu: Be calm and swift.
- Hitotsu: Take care of your health.
- Hitotsu: Live a plain life.
- Hitotsu: Do not be too proud or modest.
- Hitotsu: Continue your training with patience.

The translation above is from Teruo Chinen's dōjō, the Miyazato version is slightly different.

For other variants, including IOGKF, there are six rules and are (in English) as follows:

- Hitotsu: Respect others.
- Hitotsu: Be courageous.
- Hitotsu: Train your mind and body.
- Hitotsu: Practice daily and protect traditional karate-do.
- Hitotsu: Strive to reach the essence of Goju Ryu.
- Hitotsu: Never give up.

== Ryu-te ==
The dōjō kun Ryu-te are, in Japanese, the same as those used in Shotokan. The English translation used is as follows:

- Strive for good moral character.
- Keep an honest and sincere way.
- Cultivate perseverance through a will for striving.
- Develop a respectful attitude.
- Restrain physical aggression through spiritual attainment.

== Bushido ==
In Bushido the Dōjō Kun consists of five rules and are (in English) as follows:

- Loyalty is the essential duty of the soldier.
- Courage is essential since the trait of the fighting man is his spirit to win.
- Valor is a trait to be admired and encouraged in the modern warrior.
- Faithfulness in keeping one's word.
- Simplicity is a samurai virtue.

== Budōkan Karate ==
In Budōkan Karate the Dōjō Kun consists of four rules and are (in English) as follows:

- Show courtesy, respect and honesty towards others.
- Develop confidence through knowledge, honesty and strength.
- Never use violence for personal gain.
- Seek perfection of character.

== Shorinjiryu Kenkokan Karate ==
Dōjō Kun from the founder of Shorinjiryu Kenkokan Karate, Kaiso Dr. Kori Hisataka, are:

- Maintain propriety, etiquette, dignity and grace
- Gain self-understanding by tasting the true meaning of combat
- Search for pure principle of being: truth, justice, beauty
- Exercise a positive personality, that is to say: confidence, courage and determination
- Always seek to develop the character further, aiming towards perfection and complete harmony with creation.
