= Matsubayashi-ryū =

Style of karate

Matsubayashi-ryu (Shorin-ryu)
- Official logo
- Date founded: 1947
- Country of origin: Okinawa, Japan
- Founder: O-sensei Shōshin Nagamine
- Arts taught: Karate, Kobudō
- Ancestor schools: Tomari-te, Shuri-te, Shōrin-ryū

Matsubayashi-Ryū (松林流), is a style of Okinawan karate founded in 1947 by Shōshin Nagamine (1907–1997). Its curriculum includes 18 kata, seven two-man yakusoku kumite (pre-arranged sparring) routines, and kobudō (weapons) practice.

Nagamine named his style in honor of the two most important masters that his teachings were based upon: Sōkon Matsumura of Shuri-te, and Kosaku Matsumora of Tomari-te. He chose to name the school using the first kanji characters from both master's names Matsu (松) and the style is pronounced in Japanese "Matsubayashi". Matsubayashi-ryū is a style of Shōrin-ryū and the terms Matsubayashi-ryū and Shōrin-ryū can be used interchangeably (but not together). Normally, the style is referred to as Shōrin-ryū, but when a definite distinction is required between the other styles of the Shōrin-ryū family (Kobayashi Shōrin-ryū, Shōbayashi Shōrin-ryū and Shōrin-ryū Matsumura Seito) then it is called Matsubayashi-ryū. Nagamine also credited Motobu Chōki as the teacher who inspired his seven Yakusoku Kumite Forms.

Matsubayashi-ryū is one of the better-documented traditional karate styles, owing to Nagamine's book, The Essence of Okinawan Karate-dō. as well as Tales of Okinawa's Great Masters.

After the death of Nagamine OSensei in 1997, many of his senior students formed their own organisations to teach Matsubayashi-ryū. In the years following Nagamine Takayoshi, continued to lead the organization, but was unable to get unification, due to politics within the organization. Since 2012, Yoshitaka Taira has been the association president. There are now, many other organizations which are continuing the teachings of O Sensei outside of the WMKA.

== Kata ==
Kata are sets of moves in Karate and are considered the most important part of the Matsubayashi-ryu style.

- Fukyugata series (1-2)
- Pinan series (1-5)
- Naihanchi series (1-3)
- Ananku
- Wankan
- Rōhai
- Wanshu
- Passai
- Gojūshiho
- Chintō
- Kusanku

== Ranks ==
These are the ranks as set out by the World Matsubayashi-ryu (Shorin-ryu) Karate-Do Association (WMKA) and the Kodokan Nagamine Karate Dojo (World Honbu).

Mudansha

- 8th Kyu - White Belt, one green stripe
- 7th Kyu - White Belt, two green stripes
- 6th Kyu - Green Belt, three white stripes
- 5th Kyu - Green Belt, two white stripes
- 4th Kyu - Green Belt, one white stripe
- 3rd Kyu - Brown Belt, three white stripes
- 2nd Kyu - Brown Belt, two white stripes
- 1st Kyu - Brown Belt, one white stripe

Yudansha

- 1st to 10th Dan - Black Belt

Shogo Titles

- Renshi (6th Dan) - Black Belt with one stripe
- Kyoshi (7th & 8th Dan) - Black Belt with two stripes
- Hanshi (9th & 10th Dan) - Black Belt with three stripes
- Hanshisei (10th Dan) - Black Belt with four stripes

== Major organizations of Matsubayashi-ryu ==
After the passing of the Matsubayashi-ryu founder, Shoshin Nagamine, in 1997 many practitioners of Matsubayashi-ryu Karate-do were affiliated with the Nagamine Honbu Dojo and the Okinawan Matsubayashi-ryu Karate-do Federation.

- World Matsubayashi-ryu Karate-Do Association (WMKA) - Yoshitaka Taira and Toshimitsu Arakaki
- European Matsubayashi-ryu (Shorin-ryu) Karate-Do Association (EMKA)] Ole-Bjørn Tuftedal
- Okinawa Shorin-ryu New Zealand - Kevin Plaisted
- Matsubayashi-ryu Karate Association of Australia (MKAA) - John Carlyle
- Matsubayashi-Ryu (Shorin-ryu) Karate-Do Argentina - Shigehide Akamine Hanshi
- SKKA North American Matsubayashi Shorin Ryu Karate & Kobudo Association - Eihachi Ota
- NAMKA North American Matsubayashi Ryu Karate Association - Don Caponigro
- Okinawan Shorin Ryu Karate - Midwest-honbu-dojo - Bill George
- World Shorin-ryu Karate-Do Federation (WSKF) - Board of Directors
- Matsubayashi Shorin-ryu International - Patrick Beaumont
- Okinawa Shogen-Ryu Karate-Do Association (founded by Taba Kensei)
- Matsubayashi-ryū Karatedō Tenyōkan Association (Tiida Ryū) - Lara Chamberlain
- Shorin Ryu Karate-Do International - Figgiani Jerry (Technical Director: Tamaki Takeshi)
- SKKA Canada
- Association Shorin-Ryu Karate-Do and kobudo Yamane-Ryu Romania - Dumitru Alexandru

== Well-known Matsubayashi-Ryu practitioners ==
Ranks and honorifics have been excluded from the list for simplicity.

Okinawa

- Shoshin Nagamine, Founder of Matsubayashi-Ryu, O-sensei (1907–1997)
- Takayoshi Nagamine, Second generation headmaster (Sōke) of Matsubayashi-Ryu
- Seigi Nakamura, Senior student of Shoshin Nagamine, and Chief Instructor at the Honbu dojo
- Masao Shima, Senior student of Shoshin Nagamine
- Yasuharu Makishi, Senior student of Shoshin Nagamine
- Toshimitsu Arakaki, Senior student of Shoshin Nagamine
- Yoshitaka Taira, student of Shoshin Nagamine
- Kiyoshi Shinjo, Senior student of Shoshin Nagamine
- Eihachi Ota, Student of O-sensei Nagamine & Senior student of Masao Shima.
- Kiyoshi Nishime, Student of O-sensei Nagamine & Senior student of Masao Shima
- Takeshi Tamaki, Senior student of Shoshin Nagamine
- Chotoku Omine, Senior student of Shoshin Nagamine and sent to the United States to promote Matsubayashi-Ryu by Shoshin Nagamine
- Taba Kensei , Senior student of Shoshin Nagamine, President of WMKA at the death of Shoshin Nagamine, and Founder of his own organisation, the Okinawa Shōgen-ryū Karate-Do Assn.
- Chokei Kishaba, Senior student of Shoshin Nagamine and Founder of Shōrin-ryū Kishaba Juku
- Ansei Ueshiro, student of Shoshin Nagamine, sent to the United States to promote Matsubayashi-Ryu

United States

- James Wax, First non-Okinawan to receive a Black belt from Shoshin Nagamine in Matsubayashi-Ryu.
- Sam Palmer, Student of Ueshiro Sensei
- Joseph Carbonara - Student of Chotoku Omine
- Bob Yarnall, Student of Jim Wax
- Frank Grant Student of Jim Wax and Shoshin Nagamine, Chairman of the World Shorin-ryu Karate-do Federation
- Bill George, Student of Soke Takayoshi Nagamine

Canada

- Frank Baehr - Student of Shoshin Nagamine

== Sources ==
- Shoshin Nagamine. The Essence of Okinawan Karate-do. ISBN 0-8048-2110-0 chapter 1 pages 21–24
- Classical Kata of Okinawan Karate ISBN 0-89750-113-6 Chapter 1 page 18
- Okinawan Karate: Teachers, Styles and Secret Techniques. ISBN 0-8048-3205-6.page 12
