= Chinen =

Chinen is an Okinawan surname. Notable people with the surname include:

- Kama Chinen (知念 カマ, 1895–2010), Japanese supercentenarian
- Kei Chinen (知念 慶, born 1995), Japanese footballer
- Kaori Chinen (知念 かおり, born 1974), professional Go player
- Masami Chinen (知念 正美, 1898–1976), Okinawan martial artist and founder of Yamanni ryu
- Rina Chinen (知念 里奈, born 1981), Japanese singer
- Teruo Chinen (知念 輝夫, 1941–2015), Okinawan martial artist, grandson of Masami Chinen (知念 正美)
- Yuri Chinen (知念 侑李, born 1993), Japanese singer and actor
- Hideyoshi Arakaki Chinen
