= Ryūkyū Kempo =

Karate form

Ryūkyū Kempo (琉球拳法) sometimes spelled Ryūkyū Kenpō is a generic term often used to describe all forms of karate from the Ryukyu Islands, and more specifically to refer to the particular styles associated with Taika Seiyu Oyata and George Dillman. Whereas, Kenpō is associated with the spelling of Master Nakamura's Okinawan Kenpō, Seikichi Odo's Ryūkyū Hon Kenpō, and D'veed Natan's Ryukyu Kenpo Kobujutsu. Oyata is credited with being the originator of the American use of the terms Ryukyu Kempo, tuite-jutsu and kyusho-jutsu. The name Ryūkyū Kempo was adopted by a prominent martial arts personality, George Dillman, who taught his own version of Oyata’s style and promoted it heavily through seminars and publications. This further prompted Oyata to change the name to Ryū-te and to change the curriculum of what he was teaching to reflect his own system of "Life Protection". The Ryū-te organization is international and includes a selection of long-time students known as "Oyata Shin Shu Ho," whom he considers the heirs of his art.

== As taught by Taika Seiyu Oyata ==
Oyata’s Ryūkyū Kempo teaches a style of close-in striking and blocking as well as his own creations of a set of grappling, locking, and escape techniques (tuite-jutsu) and of advanced striking techniques (kyusho-jutsu). There are twelve open-hand kata and a number of traditional Okinawan kobudō weapons including the bō, chizikunbo, eku, jō, kama, sai, tanbo, tonfa, manji-sai, and nunti-bo. Practitioners also train in Bogu Kumite, a style of competition in protective armor initiated by Oyata and his instructor Shigeru Nakamura.

Several branches of Ryūkyū Kempo have developed. These organizations are mostly headed by members of the former Zenkoku Ryūkyū Kempo Karate Kobudo Rengo Kai. Their separate associations are loosely affiliated. They all have curricula based on that of the late Taika Seiyu Oyata. Seikichi Odo, heir to one of Oyata's instructors, Shigeru Nakamura, had his own organization that taught Okinawan Kenpō. Odo, at the request of Shigeru Nakamura's son, Taketo Nakamura changed the organizational name by changing the name to Ryūkyū Hon Kenpō Kobujutsu so as to differentiate the system he was teaching from that of Taketo Nakamura's organization. Taketo Nakamura's son, Yasushi Nakamura is the current Dojo-cho and heir to Nakamura's karate and kobudo lineage that traces Ryukyu Ti roots to the late 15th century in Okinawa. Yasushi Nakamura still maintains practice at the original Nakamura dojo, in Nago, Okinawa. Odo died without naming a successor, his son Susamo has taken the reins; and his organization, the Ryūkyū Hon Kenpō Kobujutsu Federation continues to exist. Another Oyata-based branch is located in Israel. The Ryūkyū Kenpō Kobujutsu Kai is headquartered in Jerusalem and headed by Jon D'veed Natan. It differs from the mainstream Oyata groups in that it includes a few of Seikichi Odo's Kenpō and Kobujutsu kata, a few internal system kata, and a defense curriculum not based on Oyata's civilian teachings. Bogu Kumite is heavily emphasized.

The twelve original Ryūkyū Kempo kata are:
Naihanchi Shodan
Naihanchi Nidan
Naihanchi Sandan
Tomari Seisan
Pinan Shodan
Pinan Nidan
Pinan Sandan
Pinan Yondan
Pinan Godan
Passai
Kusanku
Niseishi

These twelve kata were to be taught to those in Nakamura's association; so everyone could compete equally in the kata divisions at tournaments. It did not preclude learning system specific kata in the individual dojo. Bogu Kumite, likewise, afforded equal opportunity for all at the tournaments.

== As taught by George Dillman ==
Dillman's version of the art, which he calls Ryūkyū kempo tomari-te, has a large international following. The art is known for its emphasis on light-touch or no-touch pressure-point knock-out.

George Dillman continues to hold training camps in Deer Lake PA at the former Muhammad Ali training Camp, study under 10th degree black belts from Okinawa, give training seminars all over the world, and oversee Dillman Karate International consisting of over 85 schools worldwide.
