= Katsuhiko Shinzato =

Okinawan karateka

- Born: February 10, 1939 (age 86); Manila, Philippines
- Style: Shōrin-ryū, Yamani Ryu
- Teacher(s): Tsunetaka Shimabukuro, Shōshin Nagamine, Seigi Nakamura, Chokei Kishaba, Chogi Kishaba

Other information
- Website: KishabaJuku.org

Katsuhiko Shinzato (新里 勝彦, Shinzato Katsuhiko) is an Okinawan martial arts master and head of the Shōrin-ryū Kishaba Juku.

== Life and Karate-do ==
Shinzato was born in Manila, in the Philippines. His father was a fisherman. During the Second World War, when the war reached the Pacific, his family relocated to Ueyonabaru, Yonabaru-cho, Okinawa.

Whilst attending the University of the Ryukyus where he studied English and English Literature. He started to practice Karate in 1957 under Tsunetaka Shimabukuro. After completing his degree in Japan he then studied Applied Linguistics in the United States at Indiana University.

He returned to Okinawa in 1967 where he joined the dojo of Shoshin Nagamine. Shinzato translated Nagamine's book "The Essence of Okinawan Karate-do" into the English language. Shinzato also studied under Seigi Nakamura and Chokei Kishaba. Shinzato is a professor at Okinawa International University and the head of Okinawa Karate-do Shōrin-ryū Kishaba Juku.

Shinzato is also a member of the Okinawan Karate-do and Kobudo Encyclopaedia Committee.

== Okinawa Karate-do Shōrin-ryū Kishaba Juku ==
Shinzato became the Juko Cho, i.e., the head of Shōrin-ryū Kishaba Juku, after the passing of Chokei Kishaba in the year 2000.

Dojos affiliated with Kishaba Juku are located in Japan, the United States, France, German and Israel. Within the United States there are dojos in California, Connecticut, Florida, Hawaii, Illinois, Nebraska, New Jersey, New York, Ohio, Oregon, and Virginia.

== See also ==
- Okinawan martial arts
