= Nagamine =

Nagamine (written: 長峯, 長嶺 or 永峰) is a Japanese surname. Notable people with the surname include:

- Kaori Nagamine (長峯 かおり, born 1968), Japanese footballer
- Saori Nagamine (永峰 沙織, born 1993), Japanese archer
- Shōshin Nagamine (長嶺 将真, 1907–1997), Japanese writer, soldier, police officer and karateka
- Takayoshi Nagamine (長嶺 高兆, 1945–2012), Japanese karateka
- Tatsuya Nagamine (長峯 達也), Japanese anime director

== See also ==
- Nagamine Station (長峰駅, Nagamine-eki), a railway station in Aomori Prefecture, Japan
- Mount Nagamine (長峰山, Nagamine-san), a mountain in Hyōgo Prefecture, Japan
