= Shōrin-ryū Matsumura Seito =

Style of karate

- Also known as: Matsumura Seito
- Country of origin: Okinawa, Japan
- Founder: Hohan Sōken
- Arts taught: Karate, Kobudō
- Ancestor schools: Shuri-te
- Practitioners: Yoshimatsu Akamine, Fusei Kise, Roy Suenaka, James Coffman, Phillip Koeppel

Shōrin-ryū Matsumura Seito (少林流松村正統) (Matsumura Seito) is a style of Okinawan Shorin-ryu karate founded by Hohan Sōken.

== History ==
Matsumura Shurite or Shōrin-ryū Matsumura Seito as it would later be known is said to have been originally created by Sōkon Matsumura the father of all Shurite lineages. Sōkon would teach his grandson Nabe Matsumura including not only his karate but also the Fujian White Crane that he learned while in China. Nabe in turn would teach his nephew Hohan Sōken who would be his sole student. Upon his death in 1930, he passed his Menkyo Kaiden to Hohan Sōken, who continued the Matsumura family tradition by solidifying and formally naming the Shōrin-ryū style of Matsumura Seito karate-do.

Following Hohan's death without a clear successor the organization began to splinter with three of his senior students claiming to be the legitimate successor and forming their own organizations. Aragaki Seiki created Shinbukan, Kise Fusei creating Kenshinkan, Kuda Yuichi creating Kobukan.

== Kata ==
- Naihanchi
  - Shodan
  - Nidan
  - Sandan
- Pinan
  - Shodan
  - Nidan
- Passai
  - Sho
  - Dai
- Chinto
- Kusanku
- Gojushiho
- Seisan
- Rohai
  - Jo
  - Chu
  - Ge
- Hakutsuru
