= George Dillman =

American karateka

- Style: Kempo Karate
- Teacher: Seiyu Oyata
- Rank: 10th Degree Black Belt

Other information
- Website: http://www.dillman.com/

George Dillman (born November 23, 1942, in Philadelphia, Pennsylvania) is a controversial American martial arts instructor, who popularized the use of fake techniques such as pressure points (Japanese: kyūsho jutsu, 急所術) among the United States' martial arts practitioners. Dillman is a member of Black Belt magazine's Hall of Fame, and in 1997 was named Black Belt Magazine's "Martial Arts Instructor of the Year". For 30 years, he ran the Northeast Karate Championships. Dillman also conducts martial arts training seminars at the former Muhammad Ali training camp at Deer Lake, Pennsylvania. Dillman has been subject to scrutiny stemming from the fact that many of his most famous techniques don't work, especially those involving alleged touchless chi manipulation.

Dillman calls his style Ryukyu kempo karate.

Dillman began martial arts training in 1961 with Harry G. Smith. He went on to study with Daniel K. Pai, Robert Trias, Seiyu Oyata, Hohan Soken, Wally Jay and Muhammad Ali.

Dillman is the co-author of several martial arts books co-written with Chris Thomas, including Kyusho-Jitsu: The Dillman Method of Pressure Point Fighting; Advanced Pressure Point fighting of Ryukyu Kempo; Advanced Pressure Point Grappling: Tuite; and Pressure Point Karate Made Easy. He has also produced a DVD instructional series on pressure point technique.

== Career ==
In an interview, Dillman claims to have competed in martial arts competitions from 1969 to 1972, winning 323 trophies in breaking, forms (kata), sparring, and weapons.

Dillman's version of martial arts, which he calls Ryūkyū kempo tomari-te, emphasizes light-touch pressure-point knock-outs.

Dillman was first exposed to Ryūkyū Kempo during a demonstration Oyata held in Kansas City in 1983, where Oyata introduced his art to the mainstream martial arts community. An article was written for Official Karate magazine that featured Dillman and Oyata on the front cover.

Perhaps the best known of the seminar participants was Mr George Dillman, 7th dan, Okinawan style, of ryūkyū kempo. Mr Dillman had been told by Mr Oyata when he called, that if he (Mr Dillman) came to the seminar he should be prepared to endure pain. [...] Mr Dillman states "It's totally fantastic! I've been involved in Okinawan karate for over 25 years and I've never experienced anything like it. It gives me the answers to a lot of my katas-for a long time I didn't know the question! I still don't have all the answers, but at least I am getting it. Now I can see the hidden moves behind kata practice that have been secret for years: they are totally unreal!"

Dillman maintains that his training with Oyata was substantial and opened new paths to discovery. He also maintains that his practices of tuite-jitsu and kyusho-jitsu are based on an education he received from Oyata and Hohan Soken.

Dillman has espoused the use of chi manipulation to cause touchless knockouts and other effects. Such techniques have never been proven. Investigator Joe Nickell recounts when Massimo Polidoro and Luigi Garlaschelli investigated Dillman for the TV show Is It Real?. They set up a large curtain and stationed one of Dillman's students behind it, unable to see when Dillman attempted to send his chi punches at him. The student did not react to the chi and "simply stood looking puzzled, awaiting the chi force that never came". Polidoro and Garlaschelli speculated that "the feat depended on the power of suggestion". When Dillman attempted to knock Garlaschelli over with chi powers, Garlaschelli stated that when his (Garlaschelli's) eyes were closed it was easier to lose balance, so Garlaschelli kept his eyes open and Dillman was unable to knock him over.

== Publications ==
George Dillman is the author of many books with Chris Thomas including Kyusho-Jitsu: The Dillman Method of Pressure Point Fighting; Advanced Pressure Point Fighting of Ryukyu Kempo; Advanced Pressure Point Grappling: Tuite; and Pressure Point Karate Made Easy. He has also produced a DVD instructional series on pressure point technique.

- Tuite: Advanced Pressure Point Grappling, by George A. Dillman with Chris Thomas (Copyright 1995 George Dillman Karate International)
- Pressure Point Karate Made Easy, by George A. Dillman with Chris Thomas (Copyright 1999 Dillman Karate International, Publishers)
- Kyusho-Jitsu: The Dillman Method of Pressure Point Fighting, by George A. Dillman with Chris Thomas (Copyright 1992 George Dillman Karate International)
- Humane Pressure Point Self Defense, by George A. Dillman with Chris Thomas (Copyright 2002 Dillman Karate International, Publishers)
- Death Touch: The Science Behind the Legend of Dim-Mak, by Michael Kelly, D.O. (Copyright 2001 Michael Kelly, Published by Paladin Press)
