= Taba Kensei =

- Born: July 5, 1933; Okinawa, Japan
- Died: July 7, 2012 (aged 79)
- Style: Matsubayashi-ryu, Shōgen-ryū
- Teachers: Shoshin Nagamine, Hohan Soken, Choshin Chibana
- Rank: Hanshi 10th Dan Shogen Ryu

Taba Kensei (July 5, 1933 – July 7, 2012) was the founder and first President of the Okinawa Shōgen-ryū Karate-Do Association, which is an offshoot to Matsubayashi ryu. He was also the first President of the World Matsubayashi-ryu Karate-Do Association (WMKA) at the death of Shoshin Nagamine.

His direct successor and one of his main students is Kiyomasa Maeda.
