= Nishihira =

Nishihira (written: 西平) is a Japanese surname. Notable people with the surname include:

- Fuuka Nishihira (西平 風香, born 1992), Japanese actress
- Nishihira Kosei (西平 向盛, 1942–2007), Okinawan karateka

== See also ==
- Nishihara
