= Yonamine =

Yonamine (written: 與那嶺 or 与那嶺) is a Japanese surname. Notable people with the surname include:

- Yonamine Chiru, Japanese martial artist
- Eri Yonamine (與那嶺 恵理; born 1991), Japanese cyclist
- Wally Yonamine (与那嶺 要, Yonamine Kaname; 1925–2011), American athlete
- Tiago Yonamine (與那嶺 士, Yonamine Tsukassa; born 1984), Brazilian Nikkei Entrepreneur
