= Vibrating Palm (disambiguation) =

The term Vibrating Palm might refer to the following:

- Vibrating Palm, the "Touch of Death" Qi attacks.

- One of the five fists oassociated with Li (Lee) Family kung fu.
