= Touch of Death =

Fatal martial arts technique using little force

Chinese name
- Traditional Chinese: 點脈 / 點穴
- Simplified Chinese: 点脉 / 点穴
Transcriptions
Standard Mandarin
- Hanyu Pinyin: diǎnmài / diǎnxué
Yue: Cantonese
- Jyutping: dim^{2} mak^{6} / dim^{2} jyut^{6}

Japanese name
- Kanji: 急所術
- Hiragana: きゅうしょじゅつ
Transcriptions
- Revised Hepburn: kyūshojutsu
- Kunrei-shiki: kyûsyozyutu

The touch of death (or death-point striking) is any martial arts technique reputed to kill using seemingly less than lethal force targeted at specific areas of the body.

The concept known as dim mak (simplified Chinese: 点脉; traditional Chinese: 點脈; pinyin: diǎnmài; Jyutping: dim^{2} mak^{6}; lit. 'press artery'), alternatively diǎnxué (simplified Chinese: 点穴; traditional Chinese: 點穴) traces its history to traditional Chinese medicine acupuncture. Tales of its use are often found in the Wuxia genre of Chinese martial arts fiction. Dim mak is depicted as a secret body of knowledge with techniques that attack pressure points and meridians, said to incapacitate or sometimes cause immediate or even delayed death to an opponent. Little scientific or historical evidence exists for a martial arts "touch of death"; however, in rare cases, death can occur in response to trauma such as commotio cordis, an often lethal disruption of heart rhythm that occurs as a result of a blow to the area directly over the heart.

The concept known as vibrating palm originates with the Chinese martial arts Neijin ("internal") energy techniques that deal with the qi energy and the type of force (jin) used: "a technique that is part psychic and part vibratory, this energy is then focused into a wave".

== Claims of practicability ==
In 1985, an article in Black Belt magazine speculated that the death of Bruce Lee in 1973 might have been caused by "a delayed reaction to a Dim-Mak strike he received several weeks prior to his collapse". Other authors have also said Lee's death may have been due to a "quivering palm technique" (alongside an article about Choy Li Fut instructor Wong Doc-Fai) to the effect that "dim mak does actually exist and is still taught to a few select kung fu practitioners." A 1986 book on qi identifies dim mak as "one of the secret specialities" of wing chun.

During the late 1980s, Erle Montaigue (1949–2011) published a number of books and instruction videos on dim mak with Paladin Press. Montaigue claims to be "the first Westerner to be granted the degree of 'Master' in taijiquan", awarded by Master Wang Xin-Wu in 1985. According to Montaigue's own account, dim mak is an aspect of traditional old Yang style taji quan which he claims he began learning in 1978 from a master called Chiang Yiu-chun who died in the month of May. Montaigue stated this man was an illegal immigrant, making his existence difficult to verify. Erle subsequently learned the remaining "qi-disruptive" forms of wudang shan from Liang Shih-kan in 1995. Paladin Press has other titles on the topic of dim mak, including Kelly (2001) and Walker and Bauer (2002), both with a foreword by Montaigue.

Around 1990, Taika Seiyu Oyata founded the style of Ryū-te which involves "pressure point fighting" (Kyūshojutsu). In the 1990s, karate instructor George Dillman developed a style that involves kyūshojutsu, a term that he identifies with dim mak. Dillman eventually went as far as claiming to have developed qi-based attacks that work without physical contact ("no-touch knockout" techniques), a claim that did not stand up to third-party investigation and was consequently denounced as fraudulent.

== In East Asian popular culture ==
A "100-step Soul Catching Fist" technique appears in the Shaw Brothers film Clan of the White Lotus (1980), used by the antagonist, Priest White Lotus. In the film, it is depicted as inflicting a delayed death after the victim has taken 100 steps, by means of manipulating their blood circulation and "sealing up their pressure points". A similar technique, the "Five Point Palm Exploding Heart Technique", is used by the protagonist in the climax of Kill Bill: Volume 2, attributed to Pai Mei. A dim mak attack is used to paralyze a character in Crouching Tiger, Hidden Dragon (2000).

The manga Fist of the North Star centers around the fictional martial art school Hokuto Shinken, whose practitioners are trained to kill or incapacitate opponents by striking the specific pressure points on an opponent's body. The protagonist of the story, Kenshiro, is the successor of this style and will often end a battle stating how much time the opponent has left to live after delivering a finishing move, or follow up with his famous catchphrase, "You are already dead", before his opponent dies, usually from violently exploding.

In the Naruto series, and its sequel Boruto: Naruto Next Generations, Dim Mak is a basis for the fictional Gentle Fist fighting style used by the Hyuga Clan.

The Chinese action role-playing game Zenless Zone Zero, Pan Yinhu practices a martial art that is a mix between Dim Mak, and Bajiquan. It is noted that Pan Yinhu's style focuses more on the acupressure side of Dim Mak over the lethal aspect.

In Yukito Kishiro's manga series Battle Angel Alita, several fictional Panzer Kunst cybernetic martial arts techniques are modeled after the concept. In Phase 84 of the sequel series Last Order, the character Frau X utilizes an unnamed vibrational striking technique against Zazie that is explicitly compared to Dim Mak by other characters.

== In contemporary western pop culture ==
Dim mak has become a kind of camp pop culture item which is recognized also outside the genre of martial arts films. In Thomas Pynchon's novel Vineland, one of the protagonists uses the "Quivering Palm Death Touch", which kills the opponent one year after it is used. In the TV series Quincy, M.E., a 1977 episode entitled "Touch of Death" features a martial-arts movie star whose mysterious death is found to be a result of a dim mak attack against him ten days earlier. The lead character of the British TV series Gangsters (1978) is murdered by hired assassin "The White Devil" using a similar attack, with death occurring four days after he is touched. Dan Brown's novel Inferno depicts a character incapacitating a guard by putting pressure on his wrist, explaining the technique as "Dim Mak". In the comedy film The Men Who Stare at Goats, George Clooney's character claims to have been hit with the Touch of Death, a "light tap" that causes death at an unknown point in the future, in one case "about eighteen years later".

Dim mak is referenced in Bloodsport (1988). In the film, Dux (Jean-Claude Van Damme) proves that he has been trained by Senzo Tanaka (who is also well-respected within the fighting world) by demonstrating a variation of dim mak to the judges to back his claim. He proceeds to strike at a stack of bricks with his hand very carefully positioned before he aims downward at a specific force of speed and angle, breaking only the bottom brick. His invitation ends up being honored. Dux also uses the dim mak technique on Pumola during the Kumite before ending the match.

In the Star Trek universe, the Vulcan nerve pinch is frequently used as a non-lethal method of applying pressure to a pressure point in order to render the target unconscious.

In Doctor Who, the Third Doctor describes himself as a master of Venusian aikido on various occasions, accounting for his unique form of hand-to-hand combat, which allows him to immobilize opponents in a manner similar to the Vulcan nerve pinch. Later incarnations of the Doctor have shown varying degrees of expertise in hand-to-hand combat, although only some spin-off material explicitly identifies the later Doctors' combat skills as originating from Venusian aikido.

In the Kung Fu Panda movie series, the Wuxi Finger Hold technique used by Po is a form of Dim Mak. Likewise, the villain Tai Lung and the mentor Oogway both use a nerve-strike attack to paralyze the opponent.

In the Avatar: The Last Airbender series, the character Ty Lee uses a form of Dim Mak called chi-blocking to cripple or immobilize opponents and leave them unable to "bend" (control the elements). The fighting style is reintroduced in The Legend of Korra as the primary fighting style of the Equalists, who specifically target those able to bend elements.

In the Batman: The Animated Series episode "Day of the Samurai", Kyodai Ken, Bruce Wayne's rival from his days training in Japan, forces Master Yoru to reveal his secret death touch. Wayne survives the technique by wearing a protective pad to absorb the force of the blow.

In Kill Bill: Volume 2, a 2004 American martial arts film written and directed by Quentin Tarantino, a martial arts teacher named Pai Mei uses his Five Point Palm Exploding Heart Technique to kill opponents after they have taken five steps.

In the 2012 video game Sleeping Dogs it is the final and most powerful move that can be learned.

In The Suicide Squad 2021 film, Bloodsport, Peacemaker and Rick Flag use dim mak to kill their captors.

In Mortal Kombat 1, the Kameo character Shujinko uses a fatality that imitates a scene where the Bride kills Bill.

Steve Aoki's independent label Dim Mak Records is a reference to Bruce Lee's Death Touch martial art.

In Rick and Morty, the character Liu Sin uses the Five Point Palm Exploding Heart Technique against Rick Sanchez and Morty Smith.

== See also ==
- Iron Palm
- Neijia
- Wuxia
- Commotio cordis
