= Matsubayashi =

Matsubayashi (written: 松林) is a Japanese surname. Notable people with the surname include:

- Miku Matsubayashi (松林 美久, born 1984), Japanese footballer
- Shūe Matsubayashi (松林 宗恵, 1920–2009), Japanese film director

== See also ==
- Matsubayashi-ryū, an Okinawan karate style
