= Touchless knockout =

Supposed martial arts technique

Touchless knockout or no-touch knockout is a fraudulent practice by con artists who claim knowledge of techniques by which an enemy combatant can be rendered unconscious solely by application of qi, kiai or similar methods, without making physical contact. This differs from pressure point techniques which involve light or slight contact to specific areas of the body causing unconsciousness. Skeptics believe apparent demonstrations of touchless knockout techniques to be hypnotism of, or acting (collusion) on the part of, the apparent victims of the technique.

One notable practitioner of the fictitious touchless knockout is George Dillman; he attempted to demonstrate the technique for a National Geographic Channel program about him and was unable to knock out volunteers previously unknown to him. Another martial artist who claimed but was unable to prove an ability to knock out without contact is Harry Thomas "Tom" Cameron, who was featured in episode eight of season one of Stan Lee's Superhumans and, unusually for that program, judged not to have any superhuman ability whatsoever. Cameron was also debunked in a Fox news investigation. Other people who have claimed, but been unable to prove under controlled conditions, an ability to perform a touchless knockout include Yanagi Ryuken of Japan (sometimes misidentified as Kiai Master Ryukerin), Jukka Lampila of Finland, and numerous practitioners of the Yellow Bamboo school of martial arts centered on Bali in Indonesia.
