= Masaji Taira =

Okinawan karateka

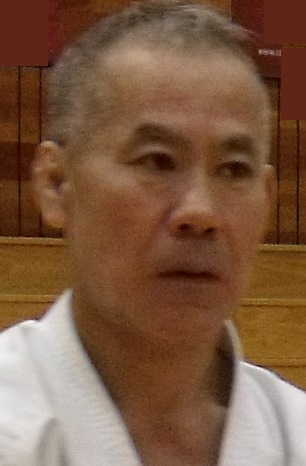
- Born: 1 December 1952 (age 73); Kume Island, Okinawa, Japan
- Style: Gōjū-ryū Karate
- Teacher: Eiichi Miyazato
- Rank: 9th dan karate

Other information
- Website: http://www.gojuryukenkyukai.com

Masaji Taira (平良 正次, Taira Masaji; born 1 December 1952) is a leading teacher of Okinawa Goju Ryu Karate Do, and head of the Okinawa Gojuryu Kenkyu Kai. His teacher was Eiichi Miyazato, a student of Chojun Miyagi and the founder of the Okinawan Jundokan dojo. Taira's karate is that of his teacher and the Jundokan, with the addition of his novel approach to the application of the kata.

Taira is best known as a researcher and practitioner of the bunkai of the Goju Ryu kata. He is unusually open in his teachings, feeling that the techniques and learning must be shared, for their preservation and to test their effectiveness.

== Early life ==
Taira was raised on Kume Island. His family were farmers, growing sugarcane and rice. In his third year of high school the family moved to Naha, where Taira finished his schooling.

When he was young on Kume Island the kids all used to do Okinawa Sumo. They would go to the sand pit when they were in school and do that during break times. There were always Okinawa Sumo competitions and tournaments between the different villages.

== Karate career ==
At age 16, Taira started training in Goju ryu karate at the Jundokan dojo of Eiichi Miyazato. There was a break in his karate training when he joined the Japanese police force. He has trained continuously at Goju ryu karate since he was 21.

He joined the Japanese Police Force when he graduated from High School. As part of his riot police training he was required to learn judo. He achieved his judo black belt in 3 months, when 6 months was more common. He attributes this to his childhood Okinawa Sumo training. He is currently 4th dan in Judo.

His day as a member of the riot squad ended at 5pm whereby he would make the journey from Gushikawa City where he was stationed to the Jundokan in Naha where from 6pm to 10pm every night he would pursue his karate training with an equal dedication under the guidance of Miyazato, founder of the Jundokan and heir to Chojun Miyagi.

In his early years at the Jundokan, he met a senior in the Dojo called Shinko Gima. Gima was a strong man whose kata exudes power. Although slight, he was formidable in his speed and technique. Realising they were on a similar path, the two men teamed up and spent their time in the dojo training together. Both hating to lose, there were many battle scars received on both sides. After the dojo on many occasions, taken by the spirit of perfecting their technique, they would make their way to the hills of Madanbashi approximately an hour's walk from the Jundokan. There, they would spend their time training until sunrise on some occasions. Given the hills and Okinawa's tropical climate, mosquitoes were always abundant, giving them all the more reason to keep moving.

Most of Taira's karate career has revolved around his focus on the Bunkai of the Kata. He has painstakingly dissected the kata and trained his body to the point where he has mastered the inner workings of Goju Ryu Kata. Taira's bunkai is unusual in his insistence on working the kata in sequence, rather than picking techniques from the kata in isolation. He is also adamant that the kata do not need to be changed to perform bunkai.

Taira's first overseas seminar was held in Seattle, Washington in 1997 and hosted by Jundokan Seattle. Since then he has been traveling the world giving seminars on his interpretations of the bunkai of the Goju Ryu kata. He has presented seminars in Australia, New Zealand, the United States and Europe.

Taira left the Jundokan dojo in 2011 to form the Okinawa Goju Ryu Kenkyukai (Okinawa Goju Ryu Research Society) at the request of his students.

Taira was promoted to 9th dan by Kishaba Chogi, founder of the Ryukyu Bujutsu Kenkyu Doyukai and one of the few remaining students of Miyagi Chojun Sensei, and a junior to Miyazato Eiichi Sensei.

Taira is also a student and teacher of Okinawan Kobudo.

== Training philosophy ==
The main focus of Taira's training is the application of Goju Ryu Kata techniques to self-defence, as bunkai. Unlike many other teachers he does not cherry pick techniques from the kata. He believes that the Kata were designed as complete fighting systems, with logical transitions from one technique to another as a complete and complex defensive flow.

It is important not to mistake his complete kata bunkai to mean that the entire kata needs to be performed. Any single technique can be used to finish a fight. The kata works as a template to prepare the student with entry and exit points for defensive and counter moves. With a complete knowledge of the system a practitioner should be able to respond to almost any attack and have a start and end point from that attack.

One of Taira's motivations in spreading his teaching world wide is to give him access to more partners of differing size and skill levels, to better test his techniques.

== Promoting Goju Ryu ==
He is well known in France and was profiled in the official magazine of the Fédération Française de Karaté et Disciplines Associées (FFKDA).

The National Geographic Channel's Deadly Arts program profiled a visit by French Canadian martial artist Josette Normandeau to Okinawa, where she trained with Taira.

== Students ==
Taira teaches seminars world wide throughout the year, visiting the US, Canada, Australia, France, Italy, Portugal, England, Lithuania, India and New Zealand. He teaches hundreds of students. His seminars are open to students from any style or organisation, continuing his themes of openness and inclusion. Through his teaching at the Jundokan and overseas, Taira has taught many students from all over the world.

In Okinawa the students most closely associated with his teachings are Satoshi Taba, Stewart Azuma, Glenn McIlvride, and Keiji Ito.
