= Wankan =

Karate kata

Wankan (王冠) (Japanese: "King's Crown" or "Emperor's Crown") (also called Okan) is a kata practiced in many styles of Karate. Not much is known about the history of this kata. It originates from the Tomari-te school and in modern karate is practiced in Shorin-ryu, Shito-ryu, Shotokan, Genseiryu and Matsubayashi-ryu.

It is often considered an advanced kata, despite its brevity. Karate master Shoshin Nagamine considered wankan to be his favorite kata. A quote from his book describes the kata as "Being characterized by unitary sequences of attack and defense".

About Wankan, Nagamine Shōshin (1978: 240) said: This kata is said to be the creation of a master in ancient times, but the creator is unknown. Wankan belongs to the old kata. It was handed down by the warriors from the Tomari area and has been handed down to the present day. Its characteristics are many passages in which defense and offense are performed in one single action, that actions are formidable, and that it is a kata of medium length.

Wankan is also known as Matsukaze (松風 or "pine tree wind") in some schools of karate.
