= Teruo Chinen =

Japanese karateka

- Born: June 8, 1941; Kobe, Hyōgo Prefecture, Japan
- Died: September 9, 2015 (aged 74); Spokane, Washington, US diabetes, kidney disease
- Style: Gōjū-ryū Karate
- Teacher: Ei'ichi Miyazato,
- Rank: 7th dan karate

Teruo Chinen (知念 輝夫, Chinen Teruo; June 8, 1941 – September 9, 2015) was a prominent Japanese master of Gōjū-ryū Karate. He founded the Jundokan International karate organization and held the title of Shihan. Chinen held the rank of 7th dan in karate.

== Early life ==
Chinen was born on June 8, 1941, in Kobe, Hyōgo Prefecture, Japan, of Okinawan and Japanese ancestry. His father, Seisho Chinen, was an Okinawan martial artist who served in the Imperial Japanese Navy; he had trained in various Okinawan weapons. His mother was Japanese. His grandfather, Matsu Chinen, was a full-time Shuri-te instructor. His granduncle, Masami Chinen, belonged to the line of masters of the Yamanni ryu kobudo school.

Although Okinawan, Chinen's father adopted Japanese ways, and this included the naming conventions applied to his children. In a 1997 interview, he spoke about his father, saying: "because he was a Japanese naval officer, he adopted the Japanese ways and did not use the Masa name for his children. Consequently, my brothers and I all received Japanese names—Akira, Hirokazu, Teruo, and Toshio. No more Chinese names, no more Masa line!"

Chinen's father died in 1944 when the captain of his ship decided to sink the vessel rather than surrender to Allied forces. When he was five years old, his family—now consisting of his mother and several siblings—returned to Shuri briefly, then settled in Naha, where his uncle worked as a policeman. His mother found work on a USAF airbase. Chinen's home in Naha was just three houses down the street from Chōjun Miyagi's dojo (training hall) and, despite his family's history in another style of karate, he began to train in Miyagi's style.

== Karate career ==
Chinen began training in Gōjū-ryū karate under one of Chojun Miyagi's senior students Ei'ichi Miyazato (1922–1999) in 1954. After about six years of training, Chinen received promotion to black belt status.

In 1959, Chinen left Okinawa to teach karate in Tokyo, where he joined his friend Morio Higaonna, who had opened a dojo there, known as "Yoyogi Dojo". Chinen has credited Higaonna with teaching him the technical aspects of Gōjū-ryū karate. In 1969, Chinen traveled to the United States of America as a technical advisor to the Spokane School of Karate-do in Spokane, Washington. Prior to leaving Yoyogi Dojo for Spokane, Miyazato promoted Chinen to yondan (fourth degree blackbelt). What was initially planned as a three-month visit led to him settling in Spokane, which became the base of operations for his karate organization.

From 1973 to 1979, Chinen traveled through Europe and South Africa, teaching karate. From 1979 to 1986, he was technical advisor to the International Okinawan Gōjū-ryū Karate-dō Federation (IOGKF) led by Higaonna. In 1987, Chinen founded his own karate organization, Jundokan International, and was no longer associated with the IOGKF. He assisted in the preparation of the book Classical Kata of Okinawan Karate (1987) as a translator. In 1987, he taught kata in Vancouver. Around 1988, Miyazato promoted Chinen to the rank of 7th dan.

In 1995, Chinen became ill from undiagnosed diabetes, but still traveled across Europe and North America teaching karate, and he continued to lead Jundokan International. Speaking in 1997 about the future of karate in the USA, he said: "I hope that the next generations will not only improve technically but also know how to share their knowledge. People must pass on the traditions and not lose them. In the old days in China and Okinawa, the teaching was done behind closed doors. Now, thanks to the media, Karatedo is no longer a secret. There's more sharing now."

Chinen developed and taught many unique and highly-effective training methods during his karate career. During these lifelong teachings, Chinen continually stressed the importance of maintaining the Zen concept of "Beginner's Mind", relentless training, maintaining strong physical conditioning, and remembering the Chinese roots of Okinawan Goju-ryu Karate. One of the prominent points of emphasis to his students was to live life with a "firm fist, but a compassionate heart".
