= Toshihiro Oshiro =

Okinawan karateka

- Born: May 1, 1949; Okinawa, Japan
- Style: Shōrin-ryū, Yamane Ryu
- Teachers: Masao Shima, Seigi Nakamura, Chogi Kishaba, Junko Yamaguchi, Jokei Kushi
- Rank: Shihan, 8th Dan (Yamanni ryu), 9th Dan (Shōrin-ryū)

Other information
- Website: Shihan Oshiro's dojo

Toshihiro Oshiro (大城 利弘, Oshiro Toshihiro; born May 1, 1949) is a martial arts master and instructor from Haneji, Nago city, Okinawa prefecture, Japan.

== Early life ==
He began his study of karate at the age of 8, eventually expanding his study to include judo and kendo. As a teen, he began studying Yamanni ryu (or Yamanni-Chinen ryu) alongside Kiyoshi Nishime, with Chogi Kishaba, the direct student of Masami Chinen, who was the only instructor of the style remaining in Okinawa.

Oshiro is currently 9th dan in both Shorin-ryu and 8th Dan in Yamanni ryu.

== Career ==
After retiring as a detective in the Okinawan Police Department, he moved to the United States in 1978.

In the summer of 2019, Oshiro moved back to live in Okinawa.

== Ryukyu Bujutsu Kenkyu Doyukai ==
In 1985 Oshiro and Kishaba founded the RBKD (Ryukyu Bujutsu Kenkyu Doyukai), an organization dedicated to the research and development of Okinawan Martial Arts. There are dojos associated with Oshiro's style internationally with a strong base in Germany and the US.

Oshiro holds seminars nationally and internationally.
