= Yonamine Chiru =

Japanese martial artist

Yonamine Chiru was an Okinawan martial artist in the 1800s and the wife of Matsumura Sōkon. Nicknamed Tsuru-San (“crane”) or Yonamine no Bushi Tsuru (“Yonamine the crane warrior”), she was well-regraded as an Okinawan sumo wrestler and considered a “tomboy” for her love of fighting. She may have had a hand in developing the Matsumura Orthodox version of the kata Seisan, which is said by the Takae-Ryu Karate-Do Association to allow women to fight with a baby on their backs.

In addition to her studies of sumo wrestling and tegumi, she was known for her skills with weightlifting.

She was the daughter of a wealthy business owner and she came from a prominent martial arts family, but she could not find a spouse because of her love of fighting. As she aged, her parents increasingly raised the dowry to marry her, but found few takers until Matsumura learned about her. While some legends describe a wrestling match between the two, Shōshin Nagamine writes that Matsumura took the more traditional route of asking her parents’ permission. They may have been married in 1818.

After their marriage, Matsumura was worried about her habit of walking home alone at night, so he pretended to be a thief to scare her; however, she was able to put up a good match against her husband, without realizing it was her husband.
