= Ryū-te =

Martial arts

Ryu-te 琉手
- Country of origin: Okinawa, Japan
- Date of formation: c. 1995
- Creator: Seiyu Oyata
- Parenthood: Uhugushiku, Wakinaguri, Shigeru Nakamura
- Ancestor arts: To-te, Shuri-te, Naha-te, Tomari-te
- Official website: http://www.ryute.com
- Meaning: Ryukyu Hand

Ryu-te (Japanese: 琉手, Hepburn: Ryūte) is an Okinawan martial art founded by the late Seiyu Oyata (1928–2012) (親田清勇, Oyata Seiyū). The word Ryū-te is a shortened form of Ryūkyūte (琉球手 "Ryūkyū hand"). Ryukyu is the original name of Okinawa prior to it becoming part of Japan. Before 1995, Oyata referred to his style as Ryukyu Kempo (琉球拳法), but eventually renamed it "Ryu-te" as Ryukyu Kempo was a reference to all styles originating in Okinawa rather than to any one particular style. Ryu-te emphasizes effective self-defense while deliberately minimizing the harm to the opponent. Its practitioners consider Ryu-te neither a sport nor a form of exercise, but rather a method of training the body and mind for the betterment of mankind.

Technically, Ryu-te is characterized by combining joint manipulation techniques 取手術 (tuite jutsu) with effective strikes to the body's weak points 急所術 (kyusho jutsu). These terms, which have become well known among martial artists, were originally introduced to the United States by Oyata in the early-1980s.

Unlike many styles of karate and other Asian martial arts which are derived from publicly taught styles popularized by notable practitioners such as Gichin Funakoshi, Ankō Itosu, Sokon Matsumura and Tode Sakugawa, Ryu-te is principally derived from private, family styles. Oyata first learned Okinawan weapons (kobudo) from Uhugushiku, a bushi and retired palace guard. He also studied with Wakinaguri, whose family was descended from the Chinese families who emigrated to Ryukyu during the Ming Dynasty. Ryu-te is also influenced by Shigeru Nakamura's Okinawan Kenpo, as Oyata was a member of the Okinawa Kenpo Karate Kobudo Federation from the time of Uhugushiku and Wakinaguri's passing until Nakamura's death in 1968.

== Overview ==
=== Etymology ===
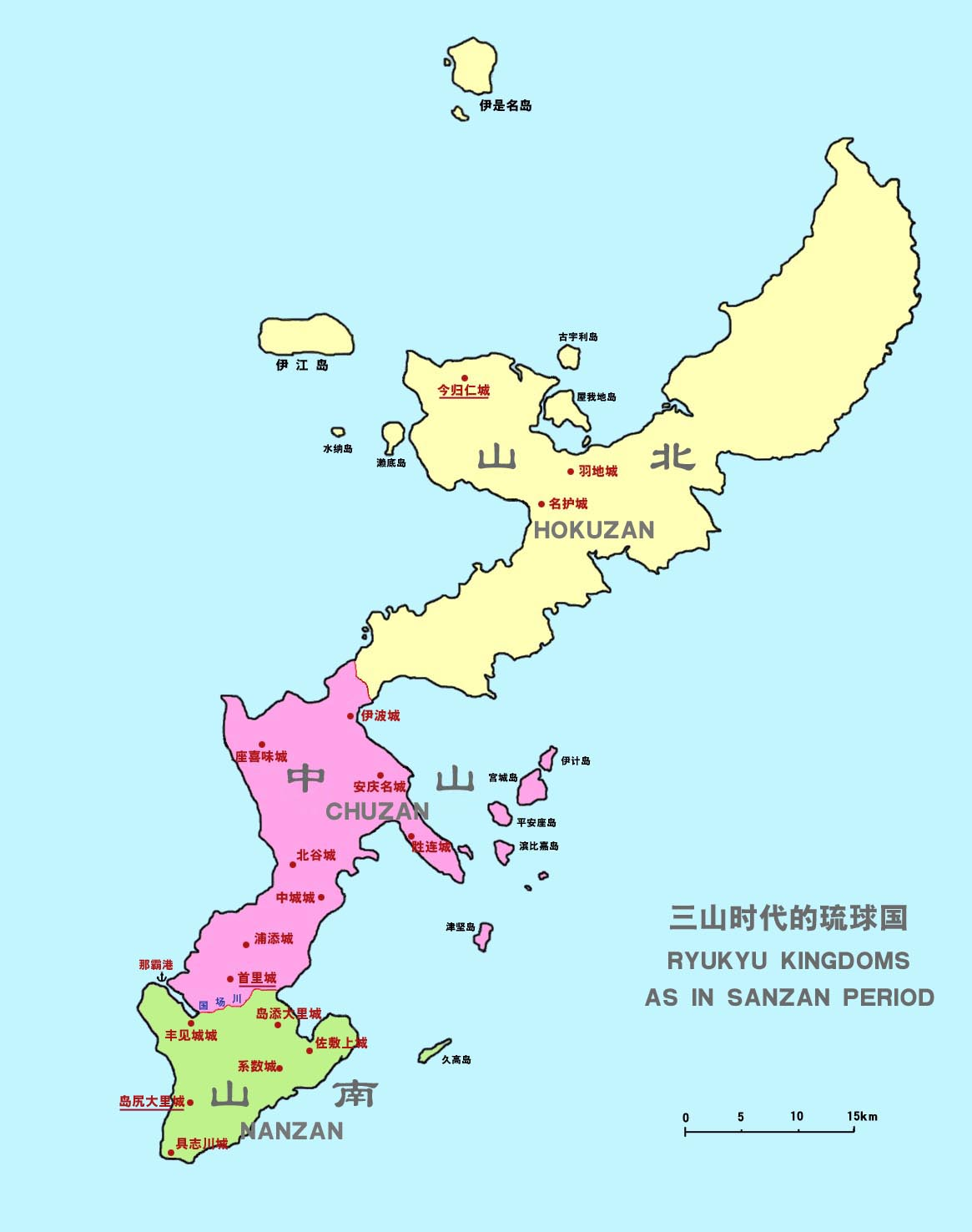
Ryukyu Kingdoms of Sanzan era

The word Ryu-te is a concatenation of two kanji:

- 琉 – Ryū – Precious stone (Lapis Lazuli)
- 手 – Te – Hand, arm

琉 (Ryū) is the first character of 琉球 (Ryūkyū) which is the name originally associated with the islands now known as Okinawa. Oyata chose to use this character in order to honor the Ryukyu Kingdom and the goals of developing a peaceful and productive society. In addition, Ryu can mean "to float", which is intended to provide a description of both how the hands should move during techniques as well as the calm state of the practitioner's mind.

手 (Te) is the word for "hand" which refers back to both the part of the body as well as the indigenous Okinawan art of the same name (Te).

=== Philosophy and Oyata Shin Shu Ho ===
The basic philosophy of Ryu-te is one of life protection. This can be seen in Oyata's book Ryu-Te No Michi with his translation of budo (武道, budō). Budo is commonly translated as "martial way" or "martial art", however, Oyata prefers to translate it as "life protection art". This interpretation stems from an analysis of the first kanji Bu (武). From an etymological perspective, it is composed of two kanji: 止 (tomaru) which means "to stop" and 戈 (hoko) which means "spear". Thus the underlying meaning of 武 can be thought of as "to stop fighting" rather than something pertaining to combat.

This underlying goal of life protection is central to Oyata's idea that martial arts are intended to improve society. With that in mind, in 1991 Oyata introduced the concept of "Oyata Shin Shu Ho" (真手法) which embodies this philosophy.

- 真 – Shin – Truthful
- 手 – Shu – Hand
- 法 – Ho – Method

Oyata introduced this expression with the hope that the "true protection spirit possessed by the ancient Ryukyu warriors would be inherited by true modern practitioners". He also explains that the first word, Shin, has several homophones in Japanese and while he chose to use 真, he had the other meanings in mind as well. The other kanji are:

- 神 – God
- 心 – Heart
- 親 – Parents
- 信 – Trust

Keeping all of these ideas in mind, Oyata's intended interpretation of Oyata Shin Shu Ho is "to strive to attain true moral goodness and to express it through one's every action".

To further reinforce the importance of these ideals, in 1994 Oyata began to induct members of his organization into the Oyata Shin Shu Ho group. These are senior members of his organization who Oyata feels embody this idea.

== History ==
=== Initial development ===
Oyata's first introduction to martial arts came from his father, Kana Oyata, who was a champion in Okinawan Wrestling or Tegumi. During World War II, he was introduced to several martial arts and trained in judo, iaido and kendo after returning to Okinawa after the war ended. Then, shortly after World War II, Oyata met Uhugushiku on a beach in Teruma. Uhugushiku was an Okinawan bushi and was a retired gate guard. During this time karate was taught openly as a public art, however, Uhugushiku's art was only taught within his family, handed down through generations. As a result, he initially would not teach Oyata, but upon learning that Oyata was related to Jana Ueekata, Uhugushiku agreed to teach him. Uhugushiku was an expert in Okinawan weapons, in particular the bo. He passed on his knowledge of weapons as well as his knowledge of tuite to Oyata.

Later, Uhugushiku introduced Oyata to his good friend, Wakinaguri. Wakinaguri was also a bushi and while of Chinese descent, was 6th generation Okinawan. Wakinaguri taught Oyata his family's style of martial arts (to-te or "Chinese Hand") which included the pressure-point strikes later popularized by Oyata in the United States. Since neither Uhugushiku nor Wakinaguri had children to whom to pass on their arts, Oyata became the inheritor of both.

=== Influence of Okinawan Kenpo ===
After Uhugushiku and Wakinaguri died, Oyata sought other karate masters to continue his training. He joined several research groups and trained directly with Shigeru Nakamura. Under Nakamura, Oyata learned 12 basic empty-hand kata that are practiced in Ryu-te today and helped establish Bogu Kumite as the "sporting" aspect of Okinawan Kenpo.

=== Introduction to the United States ===
In the late 1960s, several Americans servicemen began to train with Oyata and, in 1977, several of Oyata's senior American students (Albert Geraldi, Jim Logue, Bill Wiswell, and Greg Lindquist) began to organize within the United States. They brought Oyata to Kansas City, Kansas and established the "Ryukyu Kempo Association". Then in 1995, since Ryukyu Kempo became a generic term for any forms of karate from Okinawa, he renamed his organization to the "Ryu-te Association".

In the 1980s, Oyata began to broaden the knowledge of the general martial arts public by introducing the concepts of tuite and kyūsho jutsu that have influenced the way in which karate is taught in the modern day.

=== International dissemination ===
At the present time (2015), there are no schools affiliated with Oyata's Ryu-Te Association outside of the North American Continent.

== Training ==
=== Open Hand Kata ===
Oyata stressed that the kata form the foundation of Okinawan life protection arts as the techniques and most important concepts are contained within. The twelve basic kata taught to Oyata by Nakamura came from a variety of sources, reflecting the different influences on Okinawan Kenpo and, through Nakamura, on Ryu-te. According to Oyata, the source for each kata is listed below:

Source	Kata
Hanashiro Chomo	Naihanchi Shodan, Naihanchi Nidan, Naihanchi Sandan Pinan Shodan, Pinan Nidan, Pinan Sandan, Pinan Yondan, Pinan Godan
Kunishi	Tomari Seisan Niseishi
Motobu Choyu	Passai
Kentsu Yabu	Kusanku

=== Weapons Kata ===
Ryu-te incorporates Okinawan weapons, as the study of weapons supplements the empty-hand techniques as an integral component of training. Practitioners study the interrelationship between empty-hand movements and weapons techniques, with an emphasis on the value of weapons training in the perfection of empty-hand movement. Weapons include bo, jo, eiku, tan bo, tonfa, nunchaku, chizikun bo, sai, nunte bo, manji sai, kama, and suruchin.

Below is a partial list of weapons kata included in Oyata's art

Weapon	Kata
Rokushaku Bo (6' staff)	Kihon; Nidan Bo; Tsugi No Kun; Tsukimi No Kun; Sakugawa No Kun Sho; Sakugawa No Kun Nidansaku; Yamachino Bo*
Goshaku Bo (5' staff)	Yamachino Bo*
Jo (4' staff)	Kihon; Tsukimi No Jo; Sakugawa No Jo Sho; Sakugawa No Jo Nidansaku (lost); Jissen
Eku (Boat oar)	Matsumura Eku Sho; Matsumura Eku Dai; Matsumora Eku
Nunte (Bo with manji sai tip)	Nunte No Kata
Tanbo (2' staff)	Kihon; Bridge; Kuzushi Sho; Kuzushi Dai; Jissen
Tonfa	Kihon (Matayoshi No Tonfa Ni); Kuzushi Sho; Kuzushi Dai
Kama (Sickle)	Kihon; Kuzushi Sho; Kuzushi Dai
Sai	Kuniyoshi No Sai; Uhugushiku No Sai
Manji sai	Kuzushi Sho; Kuzushi Dai
Nunchaku	Kihon; Jyu Gata
Chizikunbo (Tijikunbo) (Hand staff)	Chizikunbo No Kata; Chizikunbo bridge; Jissen
Cane	Cane exercise

(*Yamachino Bo is the man's name. Bo is a nickname meaning "hard headed" or difficult person, Yamachino is his last name. The six foot kata is from Wakinaguri, the five foot kata from "Itoman" Uechi.)

=== Physical training ===
Training aims to improve flexibility, strength, stamina, coordination, and balance by requiring students to push themselves to and stretch beyond their physical limits. Physical training also functions as a means to spiritual attainment (i.e., improved mental and physical discipline, greater vigilance, and increased self-confidence.)

=== Moral and spiritual discipline ===
Students are required to learn and live by a basic moral code, expressed in five "Dojo Kun" and ten "Guiding Principles." Similar Dojo Kun are used in many Japanese martial arts; the English translation used for the Ryu-te Dojo Kun is:

1. To strive for good moral character.
2. To keep an honest and sincere way.
3. To cultivate perseverance, or a will for striving.
4. To develop a respectful attitude.
5. To restrain your physical abilities through spiritual attainment.

The Guiding Principles

The Dojo Kokoroe (Principles) were originally from Nakamura and not Taika. Though these are good tenets to live by, Taika felt you should memorize his motto; 'Strive to attain true moral goodness, and express it through one's every action.' The following articles were written so that those who seek the way of karate will always be aware of their guiding principles.

1. When asking to be taught, be submissive and free from prejudice, accept the teachings as shown. In this way, you will not establish your own peculiarities or bad habits.
2. Be polite and obedient to the master and other superiors. Be courteous among fellow students and followers. You must strive to develop humbleness.
3. Cultivate a spirit of perseverance. You will develop a healthy body if you have strength of mind and train fearlessly.
4. Strive to be a warrior for the construction of a peaceful and free world by using the character building, morality and spirituality contained in the way of karate.
5. In daily conduct, do not encourage fights or arguments.
6. Move from easy to difficult, and from simple to complicated. More time is required to train longer and harder as you progress. Do not hurry or engage in senseless or reckless practice. Develop gradually.
7. Become familiar with the use of the makiwara and other training equipment. Train yourself to use your fists, body and positions. Be patient and study earnestly the kata and matches. Do not aim for hurried success.
8. In the past, a single kata was studied for three years. A long time ago, a particular master analyzed a single kata for ten years. Do not think you have mastered a kata and become proud of your success. Pride will lead you to hurt your achievement in virtue and technique. Thus pride can be like a poison to the world.
9. Take care not to develop only your favorite technique, neglecting others, because that will leave a weakness in your defense. Be cautious about becoming too theoretical or technical because these too are weaknesses.
10. Ask questions freely of the master or superior because you must strive to understand what you are learning.
