= Chokei Kishaba =

Okinawan karateka

- Born: October 4, 1929; Okinawa, Japan
- Died: 2000 (aged 71); Okinawa, Japan
- Style: Shōrin-ryū, Yamane Ryu
- Teacher(s): Hohan Sōken, Shōshin Nagamine, Seigi Nakamura

Other information
- Notable students: Katsuhiko Shinzato
- Website: KishabaJuku.org

Chokei Kishaba (喜舎場 朝啓, Kishaba Chōkei, October 4, 1929–2000) was an Okinawan martial arts master and founder of the Shōrin-ryū Kishaba Juku.

He was born October 4, 1929, in Okinawa and died in the year 2000.

Kishaba's younger brother Chogi Kishaba is also an Okinawan martial arts master.

== Shōrin-ryū Kishaba Juku ==
Kishaba's senior student in Okinawa was Katsuhiko Shinzato who currently heads the Kishaba Juku.

Dojos affiliated to the Kishaba Juku are located in Germany, Japan, and United States. Within the United States there are dojos in California, Connecticut, Florida, Hawaii, Massachusetts, Nebraska, New York, Oregon and Virginia.

== See also ==
Okinawan martial arts
