= Nijū kun =

Karate technique

The Shōtōkan nijū kun (Japanese language: 松濤館二十訓) are the "twenty instructions" of the Okinawan martial arts master Gichin Funakoshi, whose pen name was Shōtō. All students of Shōtōkan karate are encouraged to live, practice, and teach the principles to others.

== History ==
Funakoshi trained in Shuri-te and Naha-te from an early age. He ultimately developed his style of karate, which he believed leveraged the benefits of these two. Gaining the attention of a larger audience, Funakoshi later ventured to disseminate his art throughout Japan, and created the nijū kun to assist his karateka in their training.

== Precepts ==
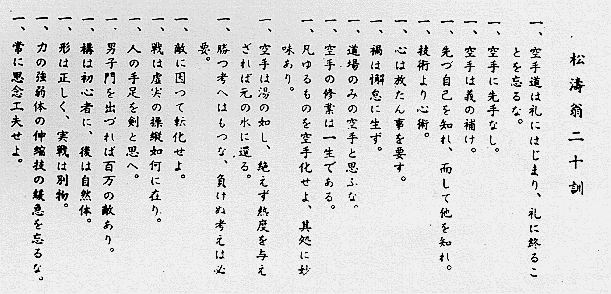
Calligraphy of the Niju kun

While it has been suggested that the Shōtōkan niju kun were documented by around 1890, they were published in Genwa Nakasone's 1938 "Karate-do Taikan" as:

- Do not forget that Karate-do begins and ends with Rei.
  一、空手道は礼に始まり礼に終る事を忘るな
  Hitotsu, karate-dō wa rei ni hajimari rei ni owaru koto o wasuruna

- There is no first strike in karate.
  一、空手に先手なし
  Hitotsu, karate ni sente nashi

- Karate stands on the side of justice.
  一、空手は義の補け
  Hitotsu, karate wa, gi no tasuke

- First know yourself, then know others.
  一、先づ自己を知れ而して他を知れ
  Hitotsu, mazu jiko o shire, shikashite ta o shire

- Mentality over technique.
  一、技術より心術
  Hitotsu, gijutsu yori shinjutsu

- The heart must be set free.
  一、心は放たん事を要す
  Hitotsu, kokoro wa hanatan koto o yōsu

- Calamity springs from carelessness.
  一、禍は懈怠に生ず
  Hitotsu, wazawai wa ketai ni shōzu

- Karate goes beyond the dojo.
  一、道場のみの空手と思ふな
  Hitotsu, dōjō nomi no karate to omou na

- Karate is a lifelong pursuit.
  一、空手の修業は一生である
  Hitotsu, karate no shūgyō wa isshō de aru

- Apply the way of karate to all things. Therein lies its beauty.
  一、凡ゆるものを空手化せよ其処に妙味あり
  Hitotsu, arayuru mono o karate kaseyo; soko ni myōmi ari

- Karate is like boiling water; without heat, it returns to its tepid state.
  一、空手は湯の如し絶えず熱度を与えざれば元の水に還る
  Hitotsu, karate wa yu no gotoshi, taezu netsu o ataezareba moto no mizu ni kaeru

- Do not think of winning. Think, rather, of not losing.
  一、勝つ考は持つな負けぬ考は必要
  Hitotsu, katsu kangae wa motsuna; makenu kangae wa hitsuyō

- Make adjustments according to your opponent.
  一、敵に因って轉化せよ
  Hitotsu, teki ni yotte tenka seyo

- The outcome of a battle depends on how one handles emptiness and fullness (weakness and strength).
  一、戦は虚実の操縦如何に在り
  Hitotsu, tatakai wa kyojitsu no sōjū ikan ni ari

- Think of hands and feet as swords.
  一、人の手足を剣と思へ
  Hitotsu, hito no teashi o ken to omoe

- When you step beyond your own gate, you face a million enemies.
  一、男子門を出づれば百万の敵あり
  Hitotsu, danshi mon o izureba hyakuman no teki ari

- Formal stances are for beginners; later, one stands naturally.
  一、構は初心者に後は自然体
  Hitotsu, kamae wa shoshinsha ni ato wa shizentai

- Perform prescribed sets of techniques exactly; actual combat is another matter.
  一、形は正しく実戦は別物
  Hitotsu, kata wa tadashiku, jissen wa betsumono

- Do not forget the employment or withdrawal of power, the extension or contraction of the body, the swift or leisurely application of technique.
  一、力の強弱体の伸縮技の緩急を忘るな
  Hitotsu, chikara no kyōjaku, karada no shinshuku, waza no kankyū o wasuruna

- Be constantly mindful, diligent, and resourceful, in your pursuit of the Way.
  一、常に思念工夫せよ
  Hitotsu, tsune ni shinen kufū seyo

The precepts are not numbered or ordered; each begins with hitotsu meaning "one" or "first" to show that each rule has the same level of importance as the others.
