= Eiichi Miyazato =

Okinawan karateka (1922–1999)

- Born: July 5, 1922; Naha, Okinawa Prefecture, Japan
- Died: December 11, 1999 (aged 77); Naha, Okinawa Prefecture, Japan
- Style: Goju-ryu Karate, Judo
- Teacher: Chōjun Miyagi
- Rank: 10th dan karate, 8th dan judo

Other information
- Notable students: Teruo Chinen, Chuck Merriman Masaji Taira, Morio Higaonna

Eiichi Miyazato (宮里 栄一, Miyazato Eiichi; July 5, 1922 – December 11, 1999) was a leading Okinawan master of Goju-ryu karate. He was a senior student of Chōjun Miyagi, founder of the Goju-ryu style. Miyazato held the rank of 10th dan in karate and 7th dan in judo; on his death, he was honoured with the degree of 8th dan in judo.

== Early life ==
Miyazato was born on July 5, 1922, in I-Chome, 13 Banchi, Higashi-machi, Naha, Okinawa, Okinawa Prefecture, Japan. Some sources indicate that Miyazato began training under Miyagi at the age of 13, while others state that Miyazato first trained under his own father and only began training under Miyagi at the age of 15. Miyazato's father had been a student of Kanryo Higaonna, who had been Miyagi's teacher, so Miyagi accepted the young Miyazato as his student. Except for an interrupted period due to World War II, Miyazato learned from Miyagi continuously until the death of the latter in 1953. Apart from his karate training, he also studied judo under Shoko Itokazu.

== Judo career ==
Miyazato was also a great judoka: he became champion of Okinawa 1950 or 1951. Miyazato also became a skilled judo master in the local police judo club and president of the Okinawa Judo Federation.

== Karate career ==
Miyazato began practicing Karate with his father (student of Kanryo Higaonna) and then became a student of Miyagi around the age of 13. Since that time, Miyazato, except for a short period during the war, trained continuously with Miyagi until his death. He also assisted Miyagi in teaching in the Okinawa Police School and was also the only one to have learned the entire teaching system and all the Kata. Miyazato was also a judo instructor: a discipline that Miyagi himself invited him to cultivate as it was complementary to Goju Ryu Karate.

Miyazato joined the Ryukyu Police Department on Miyagi's recommendation in 1946. He served as physical education instructor at the police academy, and assisted Miyagi (then an instructor at the academy), teaching karate and judo there. Upon Miyagi's death in 1953, Miyazato inherited his teacher's training equipment; he also took up the position of teaching at the 'Garden dojo,' which had been Miyagi's dojo.

After Miyagi's death (1953), the family communicated that the founder of the style wanted Eiichi Miyazato to succeed him. The Goju Ryu committee (formed by its major students) at a meeting in February 1954 voted almost unanimously Eiichi Miyazato as the official successor to Chojun Miyagi. In 1956, Miyazato opened his own dojo, the Jundokan, in Asato, Naha. The building had three levels, with Miyazato's dwelling located on the top level. In 1972, he retired from the police force and devoted the rest of his life to teaching karate. Through the early 1970s, he served as vice-president of the Okinawan Judo Federation and President of the Okinawa Prefecture Karate-do Federation.

On March 20, 1988, the Okinawa Goju-ryu Karate-do Kyokai awarded him the rank of 10th dan in karate. Apart from his karate rank, Miyazato held the rank of 7th dan in judo from the Kodokan, and was President of the Okinawa Judo Federation.

== Later life ==
Miyazato received several awards for his contribution to the martial arts. In 1984, Miyazato received an official commendation from the Kodokan. In 1994, he was awarded a Commendation for Distinguished Service from the Nihon Budo Kyogikai and received an official commendation from the Okinawa Judo Federation. In 1998, he received an official commendation from the Japanese Ministry of Education.

Following a period of poor health, Miyazato died on December 11, 1999,^{[a]} in Naha Hospital. On his death, the Kodokan awarded him the rank of 8th dan in judo. Miyazato's students included Teruo Chinen, Morio Higaonna, Masaji Taira, Ronald Michio Yamanaka and Mike Clarke. Miyazato's dojo is now run by his son, Yoshihiro Miyazato.

== Notes ==
a. According to Miyazato Sensei son, Yoshihiro, his father died on December 11. Other Sources differ on the precise date of Miyazato's death. Most state that it was December 11, but others state that it was December 10 or December 13.
