= Seigi Nakamura =

Okinawan karateka

- Historical photo of Seigi Nakamura
- Born: November 22, 1924; Okinawa, Japan
- Died: March 25, 1999 (aged 74); Okinawa, Japan
- Style: Shōrin-ryū, Gōjū-ryū
- Teachers: Shōshin Nagamine, Shinyei Kyan, Jokei Kushi

Other information
- Notable students: Chokei Kishaba, Katsuhiko Shinzato, Toshihiro Oshiro

Seigi Nakamura (仲村正義, Nakamura Seigi, 1924-1999) was an Okinawan martial arts master who learned both the Shōrin-ryū and Gōjū-ryū styles of karate.

== Karate-do ==
Nakamura practiced with Shoshin Nagamine and was also influenced by Shinyei Kyan and Jokei Kushi who were both senior students in Nagamine's dojo. For a number of years, Nakamura was the senior instructor at Nagamine's honbu dojo in Naha, Okinawa.

== Legacy ==
Nakamura profoundly influenced and inspired what is taught in Shōrin-ryū Kishaba Juku and developed and founded by his students Chokei Kishaba and Katsuhiko Shinzato.

== See also ==
Okinawan martial arts
