= Nabe Matsumura =

Okinawan karateka

- Born: 1860; Okinawa, Ryukyu Kingdom
- Died: 1930 (aged 69-70); Okinawa, Japan
- Style: Shōrin-ryū
- Teacher: Matsumura Sōkon

Other information
- Notable students: Hohan Sōken

Nabe Matsumura (松村ナビータンメー, Matsumura Nabetanme; 1860 - 1930), was an Okinawan martial arts master who helped to continue the Matsumura family style of Shōrin-ryū karate-do.

== History ==
Nabe Mastsumura, born 1860, was the grandson of Matsumura Sōkon, one of the original Okinawan Te masters and progenitor of many contemporary karate styles, including Shōrin-ryū, Shotokan, and Shitō-ryū. Being related to Sōkon meant that Nabe was privileged to extremely thorough training from his grandfather in the family's style, as well as the secret White Crane system that was only taught to immediate family members.

In his martial arts career as a sensei, Nabe had only one student: his nephew, Hohan Sōken. Upon his death in 1930, he passed his Menkyo Kaiden to Hohan Sōken, who continued the Matsumura family tradition by solidifying the Shōrin-ryū style of Matsumura Seito karate-do.
