= Morio Higaonna =

Karateka

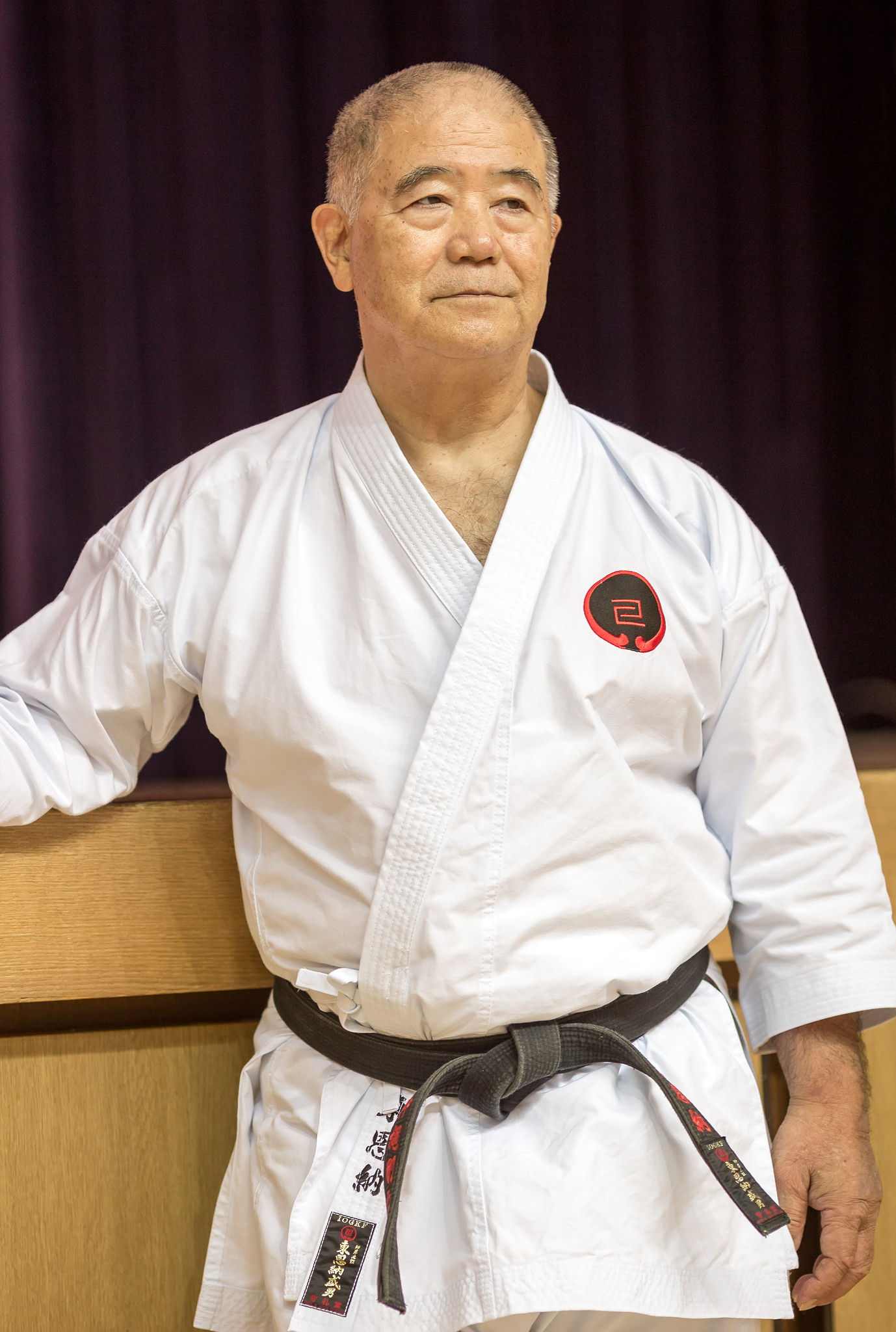
- 2016 IOGKF World Budosai (Naha, Okinawa)
- Born: December 25, 1938 (age 87); Naha, Okinawa, Japan
- Style: Okinawan Goju-ryu karate
- Teachers: Eiichi Miyazato, Anichi Miyagi
- Rank: 10th dan Goju-ryu karate

Other information
- Spouse: Alanna Higaonna
- Children: Seigi Eric Higaonna
- Notable students: Ken Ogawa, Juichi Kokubo, James Rousseau, Bakkies Laubscher, Tomiaki Tadano, Kazuo Terauchi, Masakazu Kuramoto, Yonekazu Uehara, George Andrews, Leon Pantanowitz Takashi Masuyama, Yoshinori Yonesato
- Website: https://togkf.com/

Morio Higaonna (東恩納 盛男, Higaonna Morio; born December 25, 1938) is a world renowned Okinawan karate master who is the founder and Chief Instructor of the Traditional Okinawan Goju-Ryu Karate-do Federation. He also founded the International Okinawan Goju Ryu Karate-do Federation (IOGKF). He is a holder of the highest rank in Goju-Ryu karate, 10th dan. Higaonna Sensei has written several books on Okinawan Goju-Ryu karate, including the technical series, "Traditional Karate-do: Okinawa Goju Ryu (1985) and "The History of Karate: Okinawan Goju Ryu" (1st edition1996). Martial arts scholar Donn Draeger (1922–1982) reportedly once described him as "the most dangerous man in Japan in a real fight."

== Early life ==
Higaonna was born on December 25, 1938, in Naha, Okinawa. He began studying Shorin-ryu karate at the age of 14 with his father and then with his friend Tsunetaka Shimabukuro. It was Shimabukuro who recommended that Higaonna learn Goju-ryu karate, introducing him to Chojun Miyagi's garden dojo in 1954, one year after the founder's passing. At the time, Eiichi Miyazato was the head of the dojo, but Higaonna was taught by An'ichi Miyagi, whom Higaonna recognizes as his first and main instructor in the Goju-ryu system.

When Miyazato opened the new Jundokan dojo in 1957, Higaonna followed An'ichi Miyagi over and began training there. In that same year he obtained his black belt.

In 1960, he moved to Tokyo to study at Takushoku University. On December 30 of that year, Higaonna was promoted to the rank of 3rd dan at the first all-style dan grading of the Okinawa Karate-do Renmei. He was invited to teach at Tokyo's Yoyogi dojo, where he attracted a large following. Higaonna was awarded the rank of 5th Dan in April 1966. In January 1967, he received his Menkyo Kaiden (免許皆伝), the highest level in the Menkyo system of Japan, indicating that a student has mastered all aspects of their training.

== Promoting Goju-ryu across the world ==
In April 1967, Morio Higaonna Sensei assumed the position of karate Shihan (Teacher) in the Nihon University College of Humanities and Sciences.

In May 1968, Higaonna accepted an invitation by the YMCA and traveled to Spokane in the US to conduct a series of demonstrations and lectures on the subject of karate. The trip was a success, and Higaonna received an award from the Mayor of Spokane for his well-acclaimed efforts to promote karate in the US.

On 10 October 1970, Higaonna was invited to represent Okinawan Goju-Ryu Karate-do at a special demonstration, during the first World Karate Tournament organized by the World Union Karate Organization (WUKO). This event took place at the Tokyo Budokan in Japan. Higaonna received a special letter of appreciation from WUKO for his demonstration.

Higaonna was once again invited to demonstrate at the Third World Karate Tournament organized by WUKO in 1972. Once again Higaonna received a special letter of appreciation from the organizers.

In May 1975, Higaonna accepted an invitation by the French Karate Association to conduct a teaching tour in France for younger practitioners as well as for Yudansha (black belt) practitioners. In 1977, Higaonna was once again invited to teach in France by the French Karate Association.

In July 1979, Higaonna founded the International Okinawan Goju-Ryu Karate-do Federation (IOGKF) in Poole, England. He was 7th Dan at the time, through Eiichi Miyazato. Higaonna himself sought out and received permission from the Miyagi (Chojun) family for the use of the Miyagi family crest in the IOGKF logo.

In 1980, Higaonna married Alanna Stevens and their son Seigi Eric was born in November 1981. The family lived in Okinawa from May 1981 to May 1985, then in Tokyo from 1985 to 1987.

In 1980, the Japanese government invited Higaonna to give a special demonstration during the official state reception ceremony held in honor of the president of Mexico's state visit to Japan. The demonstration was held in Akasaka in Tokyo.

In July 1981, the IOGKF held its first World Budosai and Tournament at the Budokan in Naha-city, in conjunction with the 60th Anniversary of Naha-City's founding. (The modern city government was founded on 20 May 1921, though Naha as a port-town has existed since medieval times.).

In 1982, Higaonna Sensei founded his own dojo in his own home in Naha, Okinawa. His dojo was and still is known by the name of “Higaonna Dojo”. In the following decades, this dojo has become the port of call for many senior black belt members of the TOGKF and other schools and styles seeking to train in the traditional Okinawan way.

When the BBC (British Broadcasting Corporation) aired the documentary “Way of the Warrior” in 1983, the episode on Karate featured Okinawan Goju-Ryu and focused on Higaonna Sensei, his training methods and his concepts on karate. The program was widely watched and very well received.

In 1983, Morio Higaonna Sensei began to liaise with martial-arts practitioners in the Fukien/Fujian Province of China. This was in order to research further into the history and origins of Naha-te and Goju-ryu in Fuzhou. This resulted in the first Okinawan karate seminar and demonstration ever held in Fuzhou, in 1988, and paved the way for many future exchanges between the Okinawa and Fuzhou in the following decades.

On 29 May 1984, Higaonna received his 8th dan and 9th dan promotions from Yuchoku Higa. with Higa acting in his capacity as the president of the Okinawan Karate and Kobudo Association ( 沖縄空手・古武道連盟, this is one of several umbrella organizations in Okinawa under which most Okinawan karate organizations and schools eventually became members of. The four umbrella organizations subsequently merged in 2008 to form the Okinawa Dentou Karate Shinkoukai. The TOGKF is a prominent member of this greater organisation.)

In September 1987, Morio Higaonna Sensei established the IOGKF Honbu Dojo in San Marcos, California, US. For the next few decades, the IOGKF would continue to maintain a strong presence in North America.

In September 1987, Higaonna moved with his family to Southern California to establish a new dojo. With San Marcos as a base, he began hosting budo festivals while continuing to research, practice, and travel worldwide to teach, such as in the former Soviet Union. In 2004, Higaonna was a member of the Okinawan Karate-do and Kobudo Encyclopedia Committee.

In October 1989, under the direction of Higaonna, the IOGKF held an International Karate-do Tournament in San Diego, California, US. An’ichi Miyagi Sensei presided over the tournament as its guest of honour.

On 8 June 1990, Higaonna was invited to conduct a Budo Demonstration in New York in the UN headquarters.

On 24 August 1990, Higaonna conducted a master's-level demonstration during the First World Okinawan Karate and Kobudo Festival. This event was organized by the Okinawan Karate and Kobudo Association ( 沖縄空手・古武道連盟). In the following decades Higaonna Sensei would continue to support this event by conducting seminars or gasshuku sessions on behalf the organizers during the festival.

On 18 October 1991, the IOGKF held a Goju-Ryu Karate Technical Seminar and All America Tournament in Arkansas in the US, with Morio Higaonna Sensei presiding over the event as the Chief Instructor and lecturer. Morio Higaonna Sensei was awarded a commendation by the Governor of Arkansas, Mr. Bill Clinton (later the president of the United States). The following day, the Mayor of Fort Smith, Arkansas, designated 18 October (the day on which the IOGKF seminar was held) as “Morio Higaonna Day”, and made Morio Higaonna Sensei an honorary citizen of Fort Smith City.

In February 1992, the governor of the state of Texas awarded Morio Higaonna Sensei the honorary title of Admiral of the Texas Navy in appreciation of his achievements in promoting karate in the state of Texas, US. On 2 June 1992, representatives from the office of the vice-president of the US and the state of Texas jointly presented Morio Higaonna Sensei with the title of Admiral of the Texas Navy.

In 1995, Morio Higaonna Sensei became the karate and unarmed combat instructor of the Kremlin Guard, the Police Forces and the Secret Police Forces of the Russian Federation.

In 1998, the prestigious and authoritative Nihon Kobudo Kyokai formerly recognised Okinawan Goju-ryu as a form of Japanese Kobudo, and it appointed Morio Higaonna Sensei as the representative-master of the Goju-ryu system and the IOGKF as the representative organization within their association.

In July 1999, IOGKF held an extremely successful European Gassuku in Hamburg, Germany. At the end of the Gassuku, the Mayor of Hamburg presented Morio Higaonna Sensei with a letter of appreciation on behalf of the City of Hamburg.

In February 2000, the Chairman of the Nihon Kobudo Kyokai and Nihon Budōkan, former Minister for Education, Culture, Sports, Science and Technology of Japan, Mr. Masajuro Shiokawa awarded Morio Higaonna Sensei a prestigious commendation for his efforts in preserving and promoting Okinawan Goju-Ryu Karatedo.

On 31 March 2001, The Venezuelan president presented Morio Higaonna Sensei with the Order of Vicente Emilio Sojo (A Cultural Award) for his achievements in introducing and developing karate in Venezuela.

On 10 February 2007, three renowned masters of karate, Morio Higaonna Sensei, Hirokazu Kanazawa Sensei and Hoshu Ikeda Sensei held a widely acclaimed karate seminar and demonstration in the Tokyo Kudan Kaikan.

On 22 June 2007, The Chairman of the Naha City Cultural Association (那覇市文化協会) awarded Morio Higaonna Sensei a commendation for his immense contribution to the preservation and development Okinawan karate.

In 2009, Higaonna took part in a CBBC show called Hai Karate Journey to Japan where four children and one of their parents from the UK went to Japan to learn karate, and had three weeks to gain their first rank promotion, to yellow belt.

On October 12, during the Euro Asia Gasshuku in Moldova, Higaonna Sensei received a special award from the President of Moldova, Nicolae Timofti, for his many years of contribution to spread traditional karate and its value to the country as well as building friendship between Moldova and Japan. It was the highest award that foreigners can receive in the country.

In July 2012 in Okinawa, in order to free up time working to have Karate recognized by UNESCO as Intangible Cultural Heritage, Higaonna Sensei stepped in to the position of "Saiko Shihan". This position was vacated a few years earlier by the death of his teacher, An'ichi Miyagi. Higaonna appointed Sensei Tetsuji Nakamura to Shuseki Shihan.

On 8 May 2013, the Okinawan Government presented Higaonna with an award and title recognizing him as an Intangible Cultural Treasure of Okinawa, a recognition of his many years of dedication and preservation of Goju-ryu Karate, which itself was an important part of the Okinawan culture and history. A title such as this is the highest an individual may receive in Japan for the martial arts, and it has only been awarded to a handful of grandmasters in the modern history of Japan.

In December 2018, in recognition to his services to traditional Okinawa Goju Ryu Karate Higaonna received a formal invitation to the Japanese Emperor's 30th Anniversary from the Prime of Japan, Abe Shinzo.

On February 24, 2019, he attended the Japanese Emperor's 30th Anniversary event held in the National Theatre of Japan.

Higaonna currently resides in Naha, Okinawa where he is still working to see Okinawan Karate recognized by UNESCO as Intangible Cultural Heritage. To this day he still remains the only Okinawan or Japanese karateka to have ever been invited to give a live karate demonstration in front of the Japanese Emperor and his family. He remains actively involved in spreading Okinawan Goju Ryu to any and all at his TOGKF Honbu dojo, in Tsuboya, Naha, Okinawa.

== Break with IOGKF ==
In 2022, Higaonna left the IOGKF, the organization he had founded and announced he would be starting a new organization called the Traditional Okinawan Goju Ryu Karate-do Federation (TOGKF). Senior students including Bakkies Laubscher, Kazuo Terauchi, Juichi Kokubo, Masakazu Kuramoto, Yonekazu Uehara, George Andrews, Yoshinori Yonesato followed Higaonna Sensei to his new Federation. In February 2024 the Nihon Kobudo Kyokai in keeping with its appointment of Higaonna sensei as its representative-master of the Goju-ryu system, switched to Higaonna's newly established TOGKF as its representative organization within their association.

On February 21, 2023, IOGKF International reported in a Facebook message that fake e-mails were circulating with the intent to influence the members of the association on the detail of Higoanna's departure through identity fraud. Attempts by IOGKF Chief Instructors, led by Tetsui Nakamura, to reconnect with Higaonna and repair the rift failed. In the 2023 February issue of IOGKF International Magazine, IOGKF vice chief instructor, sensei Ernie Molyneux, stated that he hoped that the members have not been affected too much by the developments of the previous months.
