= Kosei Nishihira =

Okinawan karateka

Nishihira Kosei
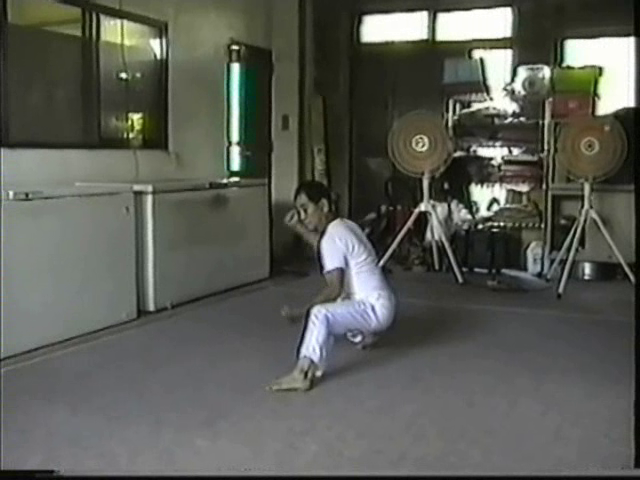
- Historical photo of Nishihira Kosei
- Born: June 10, 1942; Okinawa
- Died: May 14, 2007 (aged 64); Nishihara, Okinawa
- Style: Shorin Ryu Matsumura Seitō Karate Kobudō
- Teacher(s): Hohan Sōken

Other information
- Notable students: Giuseppe Meloni, Ricky Rose, Ted Lange, Richard Boyden.

Kosei Nishihira (西平 向盛, Nishihira Kōsei, 10 June 1942 – 14 May 2007) was an Okinawan martial arts master of Shōrin-ryū Matsumura Seitō Karate and Kobudō.

== Biography ==
Kosei Nishihira was born on the 10th of June 1942 in a small village close to Yonabaru, south of Okinawa, in Japan. From the age of fifteen, he studied the "orthodox" karate style known as Shōrinryū Matsumura Seitō Karate with Master Hohan Sōken.

The style Nishihira was taught was very difficult, and only handed down to a very few, carefully selected "uchi-deshi" (internal students). Some external students from Japan and United States of America were also taught but without some of the techniques and training considered too dangerous for general use.

At the age of thirty, he married the daughter of an Okinawan kobudō expert and had two sons. He opened a "bentoyasan" shop (lunch box caterer) in Nishihara, close to his "Sensei" Hohan Soken's house and despite his busy working days, practiced karate with commitment and passion. His diligence and commitment led to a close relationship with his Master Soken, so much that Nishihira used to call him "Tan-mei" (little uncle). Nishihira remained close to Grand Master Soken right up until Soken's death, taking care of him in his old age.

During his life, Nishihira often had to challenge much stronger opponents who he eventually managed to overcome thanks to his Grand Master Soken's strict training. He was perfectly aware of the effectiveness of his techniques and had no need to create a different style.

Although he maintained a low profile for many years, Kosei Nishihira became a Grand Master, internationally recognized as the heir of Karate Matsumura Seito of Grand Master Soken. Thanks to his humble and reserved behavior, he was faithful to his Master's desire not to openly promote his style but rather to only hand the style down to the worthiest of students. His commitment to this paradigm was such that his neighbors were not aware he was a world-renowned karateka.

Nishihira Kosei Sensei continued training until May 14, 2007, when, at the age of 64, he died.

Several karate masters in the world now claim to have been Master Nishihira's students but before dying, Master Nishihira only recognized a small handful of masters as his students, namely Giuseppe Meloni (representative for Europe), Ricky Rose (U.S.A), Theodore Lange (Australia), Steve Watson (Australia), Richard Boyden. Ricky Rose and Theodore Lange were also students of Master Soken Hohan.

== Bibliography ==
- Paolo Vaccaro, "Shorin Ryu Matsumura Seito Karate – La vita dei maestri ieri e oggi", Gruppo Editoriale L'Espresso Spa, 2011 (in Italian)
- Ronald L. Lindsey, "Okinawa no bushi no te", ed. R R Enterprises, 2011. ISBN 0-6155-3412-0.
- Tetsuhiro Hokama, "Karate Site Guidance", ed. Budovideos, 2003
- Shoshin Nagamine, "Tales of Okinawa's Great Masters", ed. Tuttle Publishing, 2000. ISBN 0-8048-2089-9.
- Mark Bishop, "Okinawan Karate: Teachers, Styles and Secret Techniques", ed. Tuttle Publishing, 1990. ISBN 0-7136-5666-2.
- Takayo Nakaya, "Karatedo History & Philosophy"
