= Takayoshi Nagamine =

Karate master (1945–2012)

- Born: August 12, 1945; Naha City, Okinawa, Japan
- Died: April 25, 2012 (aged 66); Naha City, Okinawa, Japan
- Style: Karate (Matsubayashi-ryu (Shorin-Ryu))
- Teacher: Shoshin Nagamine
- Rank: Hanshisei, 10th Dan Nidai-Sōke

Other information
- Website: matsubayashi-ryu.com

Takayoshi Nagamine (長嶺 高兆, Nagamine Takayoshi; August 12, 1945 – April 25, 2012) was a prominent Okinawan karate master and also at times a Naha City Councilman and a Criminal Investigator for the United States Marine Corps.

== Early life ==
Takayoshi was born in Naha, Okinawa as the son of Shoshin Nagamine, the founder of Matsubayashi-ryu Karate-do and living intangible cultural asset. He commenced training in Matsubayashi-ryu Karate-do under his father's tutelage at the age of six years.

== Career ==
At the direction of his father, and in order to help the development of Matsubayashi-ryu Karate-do world-wide, Takayoshi went to the United States at the age of 20, in the late 1960s and where he remainder for over 10 years, and opened a dojo in Cincinnati, Ohio. Nagamine also taught clinics and seminars in the Ohio region and around the United States until he returned to Okinawa in 1979 and later would travel around the world teaching seminars in various countries to promote Matsubayashi-ryu. Nagamine Takayoshi Sensei's senior students in Cincinnati Ohio were James Driggs, Bill George, Steve Rafferty, Rick Kemper, Bill Weiss and Dave Williams

Takayoshi returned to Okinawa in order to assist his father, Shoshin Nagamine with the running of the World Honbu Dojo (Headquarters) and the World Matsubayashi-ryu (Shorin-ryu) Karate-do Association (WMKA). In 1991, Shoshin Nagamine retired from running the Matsubayashi-ryu organisation and in a speech passed the leadership on to his son, Takayoshi Nagamine.

In 1992, Takayoshi called together senior instructors in Okinawa and the United States and formed what is now known as the World Matsubayashi-ryu (Shorin-ryu) Karate-do Association (WMKA). In 1997 after his father's death, Takayoshi took the position as the second Sōke (head) of the Matsubayashi-ryu Karate-do system. In October 2008, Takayoshi was promoted to the rank of Hanshisei 10th Dan in Matsubayashi-ryu. Takayoshi coordinated and participated in the development, establishment and teaching at dojos throughout the world including, but not limited to Australia, United States, Germany, Norway, Ireland and Canada)

Soke Nagamine was a great ambassador for Matsubayashi-ryu world-wide and spent much of his life around the world teaching seminars and clinics. He would regularly host international seminars, with the most recent being held in Naha City, Okinawa in November 2010 to celebrate the 75th Anniversary Festival of Matsubayashi-ryu and to commemorate the 13th Anniversary Tribute to Osensei Shoshin Nagamine’s passing. The event was attended by over 330 members of the WMKA.

In an interview in 2011, Nagamine said "We have this five fundamentals philosophy. This philosophy was from my father and his teacher, and it’s very, very old – up to 700 years. Basically, the five philosophies are contributing to our understanding, to our essence of the mind'. These philosophies included:

1. You have to live in accordance with the principles of nature. You have to respect your parents and respect your philosophy.
2. We are studying movement. Once you study movement, you have to know how to function with your body to be able to use these moves. To become functional, you have to be conscious of every move you make.
3. You have to learn very well from your experiences and from other people’s experiences – experiences that will teach you something valuable. Not only in education, but also in experience.
4. You have to strive for a sense of history and culture.
5. 5. Master your fighting techniques not from your imagination or reasoning, but through actual combat. Know what you can do, and what you can learn from the art of Karate. Don’t obtain any techniques by your imagination. You have to prove what you can by doing – action, not imagination.

After the passing of Nagamine, the WMKA Board of Directors elected three new members for the international organization. In addition to being direct students of Shoshin Nagamine. As of 2024 the current chairman is Tetsuo Makishi, son of Yasuharu Makishi (a direct student of Shoshin Nagamine)

In addition to the World Matsubayashi-ryu Karatedo Association, there are many other organizations and groups around the world that continue to promote and teach Matsubayashi-ryu and the Nagamine Legacy, including one of the largest ones SKKA, directed by Eihachi Ota Hanshi, 10 Dan, who has been teaching directly in the USA and around the world since 1969. He is also a direct student of Nagamine Shoshin O-sensei and Shima Sensei.

== See also ==
Okinawan martial arts
