= Yakusoku Kumite Forms =

Karate technique

In karate, yakusoku kumite (from Japanese 約束 yakusoku 'promise' Kumite 組 手 'grappling hands') is the group of pre-arranged karate sparring forms that are designated to equip the practitioner with the essential skills required to perform any of the jiyu 自由 ('free') Kumite sparring forms. When an extreme sporting application of jiyu kumite, such as in a full contact mixed martial arts contest, is the exclusive training focus of the participant, then the practice of the more basic forms of yakusoku kumite tend to be neglected. However, traditional karate organisations such as Shotokan Karate Union and Shotokan Karate-do International Federation, Japan Karate Association that follow the budo form of jiyu kumite incorporate the yakusoku kumite forms within their grading syllabus.

Yakusoku Forms of Kumite
Gohon
Sanbon
Kihon Ippon
Kaeshi Ippon
Jiyu Ippon
Okuri Jiyu Ippon
Happo

Jiyu Forms of Kumite
Kyogi 競技 sporting competition
Budo 武道 martial way
Jissen 実戦 actual fighting
