= Masami Chinen =

Okinawan karateka

- Born: 知念 正美 (Chinen Masami); 1898; Okinawa, Japan
- Died: 1976 (aged 77–78); Okinawa, Japan
- Style: Shōrin-ryū, Yamani Ryu or Yamane Ryu
- Teachers: Sanra Chinen, Chinen- PECHIN (Yamagusuku Andaya), Shichiyanaka Chinen

Other information
- Notable students: Chokei Kishaba, Shūgorō Nakazato

Masami Chinen (知念 正美, Chinen Masami; 1898-1976) was an Okinawan martial arts master who formed Yamani ryu. He taught Bōjutsu privately at his home in the village of Tobaru, in Shuri, Okinawa.

== Life ==
Like many martial arts masters Chinen had been a policeman. During the Second World War he lived with the martial arts master Horoku Ishikawa in Tainan, Taiwan. He also worked at the Shuri City Hall in Shuri, Okinawa.

== Yamani Ryu Bōjutsu ==
Chinen named the style after his father Sanra Chinen who was also a teacher of Bōjutsu and known as Yamani Usumei and Yamane Tanmei.

== Legacy ==
Although the style ceased to exist after his death, some of his katas were preserved by Seitoku Higa of the Bugeikan and Shūgorō Nakazato of Shōrin-ryū. Another student of Chinen's, Chōgi Kishaba and his student Toshihiro Ōshiro also privately practised Yamani Ryu katas. Ōshiro teaches Bōjutsu today, and so did Chinen's grandnephew Teruo Chinen.

== See also ==
Okinawan martial arts
