= International Okinawan Gōjū-ryū Karate-dō Federation =

Largest Okinawan Karate organisation in the world

- Abbreviation: IOGKF
- Formation: 1979
- Type: NGO
- Purpose: Traditional Martial Art
- Headquarters: Shudokan
- Location: Burlington, Ontario, Canada
- Chief Instructor: Tetsuji Nakamura
- Website: iogkf.com

International Okinawan Gōjū-Ryū Karate-dō Federation (IOGKF), is an international Martial Art organization covering Gōjū-ryū Karate. It was founded by Morio Higaonna (b. 1938) in July 1979. The IOGKF was established for the purpose of protecting and preserving the traditional Gōjū-ryū karate style of Okinawan as an intangible cultural treasure in its original form as passed on by Gōjū-ryū founder, Chojun Miyagi. In 2012, Higaonna took up an advisory role within the Federation and appointed Tetsuji Nakamura as his successor and chief instructor of IOGKF International. Ernie Molyneux and Henrik Larsen were also promoted to IOGKF Vice Chief Instructor at the same time and together the three formed the IOGKF International executive committee. In 2022, Morio Higaonna Sensei left the IOGKF after being refused permission to return as the global chief instructor of the organization he founded. He then created a new organization, TOGKF.

The Okinawa IOGKF headquarters was then moved from Okinawa to the Shudokan Karate and Family Center, Burlington, Ontario, Canada.F.

== Membership ==
Since its formation, the IOGKF has grown to have more than 55 affiliated countries and over 75,000 members worldwide.

== Structure ==
IOGKF Structure:

- Founder of the IOGKF: Morio Higaonna
- World Chief Instructor & Chairman: Tetsuji Nakamura
- IOGKF Vice Chief Instructors: Ernie Molyneux and Henrik Larsen
- IOGKF Executive Committee: Tetsuji Nakamura, Ernie Molyneux, Henrik Larsen and Jorge Monteiro.
- IOGKF Advisors: Katsuya Yamashiro, Joe Roses, Luis Nunes, Pervez Mistry.
- IOGKF Technical Committee: Sydney Leijenhorst, Torben Svendsen, Paolo Spongia, Linda Merchant, Andy Franz.
