= Seikichi Odo =

Okinawan karateka

- Born: July 26, 1926; Okinawa, Japan
- Died: March 24, 2002 (aged 75); Okinawa, Japan
- Style: Kenpō, Okinawan kobudō
- Teachers: Koho Kuba, Mitsuo Kakazu, Kenko Nakaima, Shimpo Matayoshi, Seiki Toma, Nakamura Shigeru
- Rank: 10th degree red belt in Okinawan Kenpō Karate

Seikichi Odo (July 26, 1926, in Okinawa – March 24, 2002), whose name means "world walker" in Japanese, was a karateka. He combined kobudō and karate techniques to found the Ryūkyū Hon Kenpo Kobujutsu Federation.

== Education ==
Of pechin descent, he was small in stature and introverted as a youth. At age 9 Odo began his martial arts training in judo. At age 13 Odo met Koho Kuba of Kawasaki, Okinawa. Kuba taught Odo the art of Okinawa-te. At the age of 20, Odo began to study Okinawan kobudō. He studied weapons arts diligently to ensure the preservation of the old ways. Odo's kobudō instructors included many of the leading practitioners of Okinawa, such as Mitsuo Kakazu, Kenko Nakaima, Shinpo Matayoshi and Seiki Toma. At 23 Odo began to study karate under Shigeru Nakamura. Odo studied both kobudō (with Mitsuo Kakazu) as well as karate and kobudō with Seiki Toma, who was a student of Zenpo Shimabukuro who was taught by Chōtoku Kyan (1870–1945). Odo considered Nakamura as his primary instructor as well as mentor.

== Shigeru Nakamura ==
Nakamura was born on January 20, 1894. His karate training started whilst in attendance of Icchu Middle School in Shuri. It was here that both Kanryo Higashionna (1845–1915) and Chomo Hanashiro (1869–1945) were the karate instructors. Itosu Ankō (1830–1915) as well as Kentsu Yabu (1863–1937) also made visits to the school. After middle school, Nakamura returned to Nago city where he trained under Shinkichi Kuniyoshi. In 1953, Nakamura opened his own dojo in Nago city and called his form of karate "Okinawa kenpo".

Seikichi Odo took over teaching in the dojo as Nakamura aged. Odo asked Nakamura if he would allow incorporating kobudō with karate teachings. Nakamura was hesitant to allow this, but in the end did. Odo incorporated Kobudo in the mid-1970s. In July 1983, Odo restructured the Okinawa Kenpo Karate-Kobudō Association, renaming it the Okinawa Kenpo Karate Kobudō Federation. In 1998 to ease derisiveness, Odo changed the federation name to the Ryūkyū Hon Kenpo Kobujutsu Federation. Odo's Ryūkyū Hon Kenpo Kobujutsu Federation teaches a total of 50 kata; 20 open hand forms and 30 weapons kata.

As Odo said, "You keep, keep my kata straight".

== Bogu Kumite ==
Bogu Kumite (防具組手) is a form of armored training used in some Okinawan kempo styles of karate. The origin of this unique training approach is credited to Shigeru Nakamura. Shorin-ryu, Chito-ryu, Isshin-ryu, Shorinji-ryu and Nippon Kempo also employ this training method.

Bogu Kumite is a rough, full contact training method in which the participants are discouraged from using feints and jabs and are expected to throw full-power blows. Rules vary between practitioners, but a generally accepted norm is to only count strikes that would incapacitate the opponent, had they not been wearing the gear. Hits must land on the gear and on the steel cage of the mask.

== Equipment ==
Bogu gear is made of pieces analogous to those of kendo bōgu.

Men- steel cage mask (or heavy clear plastic) that covers the anterior and lateral head, with an opening in back. It extends to the neck to provide a degree of control during heavy impacts. Kumite men usually have shorter neck pieces since they do not usually need to stop the heavy blows to the clavicle as with kendo armor.

Kote- padded gloves, often of the Kempo variety with finger articulations.

Do- semi-rigid chest protector made with several padded plates of various materials such as heavy plastic or light metals sewn into it.

Participants also usually wear a groin protector, elbow pads and shin protectors as with other karate training methods.
