= Hohan Sōken =

Okinawan karateka

- Historical photo of Hohan Sōken
- Born: May 25, 1889; Nishihara, Okinawa, Japan
- Died: November 30, 1982 (aged 93); Okinawa, Japan
- Style: Shōrin-ryū
- Teacher: Nabe Matsumura

Other information
- Notable students: Roy Suenaka, Chokei Kishaba, Nishihira Kosei, Fusei Kise, Ricky Rose, David Lukasiak, Norman Small.

Hohan Sōken (祖堅 方範, Soken Hōhan) was an Okinawan martial arts master who founded the Shōrin-ryū Matsumura Seito Okinawa Karate Kobudo Association.

== Biography ==
He was born May 25, 1889 (although at least one text puts his birth year as 1891) in Nishihara, Okinawa.

He was the nephew of Nabe Matsumura (who was the grandson of Matsumura Sōkon). He began karate training at 13 under his uncle. Matsumura taught him several kata, including Naihanchi Shodan, Naihanchi Nidan, Pinan Shodan, Pinan Nidan, Passai Sho, Passai Dai, Chinto, Kusanku, Gojushiho, Sanchin, Rohai Jo, Rohai Chu, Rohai Ge, and finally at age 23, Hakutsuru. Soken has said in interviews that Kusanku is the most important kata to the style.

In 1924, Sōken emigrated to Argentina. While in Argentina, he worked as a photographer and clothes cleaner. He also taught karate to Japanese and Okinawan ex-pats in Buenos Aires. In 1952, he returned to Okinawa and started to teach karate, first to family members. Then he opened a small dojo to the public. At first, he called the style "Matsumura Shuri-te." But in 1956, changed the name to Matsumura Seito Shōrin-ryū karate.

Hohan Sōken died on November 30, 1982, in Nishihara, Okinawa.

== Students ==
His senior students included Seiki Arakaki, Mitsuo Inoue, Hideo Nakazato, Kohama, Kohatsu, Yonashiro Masaya Kyan, Nishihira Kosei, Isao Toma, Yoshimatsu Akamine, Seijun Kina, Seizen Kinjo, Yuichi Kuda, Fusei Kise, Takaya Yabiku, Roy Suenaka, James Coffman, Thomas Hunnicutt, Vincent C.Wiegand, Ted Lange, Rick Rose, David Lukasiak, Charles Garrett, David Mauk, Gary Bunk, John Peeler, and Norman Small (Made Australian Director by Master Hohan Soken in 1979).
