= Sōkon Matsumura =

19th-century Okinawan karateka

Sōkon "Bushi" Matsumura 松村 宗棍
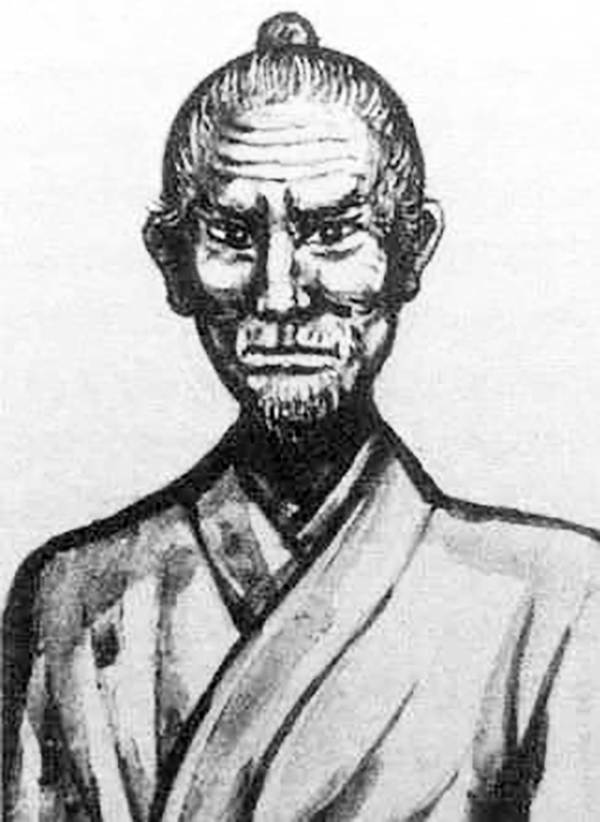
- Born: 1809; Yamakawa Village, Shuri, Ryūkyū Kingdom
- Died: 1899; Shuri, Okinawa Prefecture, Japan
- Style: Shuri-te,
- Teachers: Kanga Sakukawa, Annan, Iwah

Other information
- Notable students: Ankō Asato, Ankō Itosu, Motobu Chōyū, Motobu Chōki, Kentsu Yabu, Nabe Matsumura,Hanashiro Chomo, Chōtoku Kyan, Gichin Funakoshi

Sōkon Matsumura (松村 宗棍, Matsumura Sōkon) was one of the original karate masters of Okinawa. The years of his lifespan are reported variously as 1809–1901 or 1798–1890 or 1809–1896 or 1800–1892. However, the dates on the plaque at Matsumura's tomb, put there by Matsumura's family, clearly state that he was born in 1809 and died in 1899 at approximately the age of 90 years old.

== Early history ==
Sōkon Matsumura was born in Yamagawa Village, Shuri, Okinawa. Matsumura began the study of karate under the guidance of Sakukawa Kanga. Sakukawa was an old man at the time and reluctant to teach the young Matsumura, who was regarded as something of a troublemaker. However, Sakukawa had promised Kaiyo Sōfuku, Sōkon Matsumura's father, that he would teach the boy, and thus he did. Matsumura spent five years studying under Sakukawa. As a young man, Matsumura had already garnered a reputation as an expert in the martial arts.

== Royal Service ==
Matsumura was recruited into the service of the Shō family, the royal family of matsumura Ryūkyū Kingdom in 1836 and received the title Shikudon (also Chikudun Pechin), a gentry rank. He began his career by serving the 17th King of Ryūkyū's second Shō dynasty, King Shō Kō. In 1838 he married Yonamine Chiru, who was a martial arts expert as well. Matsumura eventually became the chief martial arts instructor and bodyguard for the Okinawan King Shō Kō. He subsequently served in this capacity for the last two Okinawan kings, Shō Iku and Shō Tai. Matsumura traveled on behalf of the royal government to Fuzhou and Satsuma. He studied Chuan Fa in China as well as other martial arts and brought what he learned back to Okinawa.

== Jigen-ryū ==
He was the first to introduce the principles of Satsuma's swordsmanship school, Jigen-ryū, into Ryūkyū kobujutsu (Ryūkyūan traditional martial arts) and he is credited with creating the foundation for the bōjutsu of Tsuken. He passed on Jigen-ryū to some of his students, including Ankō Asato and Itarashiki Chochu. The Tsuken Bō tradition was perfected by Tsuken Seisoku Ueekata of Shuri.

== Kata ==
Matsumura is credited with passing on the kata known as naihanchi, passai, seisan, chintō, gojūshiho, kusanku (the embodiment of kusanku's teaching as passed on to Tode Sakugawa). Matsumura also passed on a secretive white crane system through his family, which his great nephew Hohan Soken taught to a few select students, including Roy Suenaka.

== Teachings of Bushi Matsumura ==
Matsumura was given the title "bushi" meaning "warrior" by the Okinawan king in recognition of his abilities and accomplishments in the martial arts. Described by Gichin Funakoshi as a sensei with a terrifying presence, Matsumura was never defeated in a duel, though he fought many. Tall, thin, and possessing a pair of unsettling eyes, Matsumura was described by his student Ankō Itosu as blindingly fast and deceptively strong. His martial arts endeavors have been the progenitor of many contemporary karate styles: Shōrin-ryū, Shotokan, and Shitō-ryū, for example. Ultimately, all modern styles of karate that evolved from the Shuri-te lineage can be traced back to the teachings of Bushi Matsumura. Of note, his grandson was the modern Tōde master, Tsuyoshi Chitose, who assisted Gichin Funakoshi in the early introduction and teaching of karate in Japan and who founded the Chitō-ryū (千唐流 ?) style.

== See also ==
- Okinawan martial arts

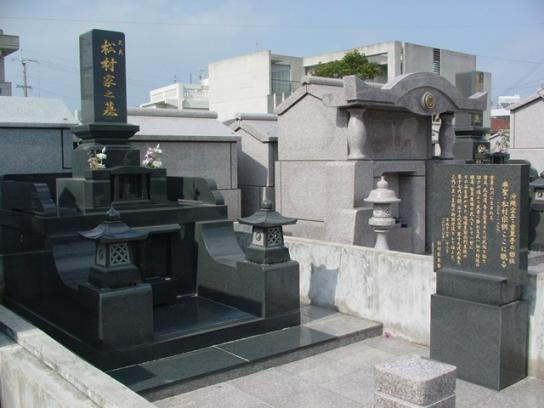
Sōkon Matsumura's grave
