= Roy Y. Suenaka =

American martial arts practitioner (1940–2020)

- Born: June 25, 1940; Honolulu
- Nationality: American
- Style: Founder of Wadokai Aikido

Roy Yukio Suenaka (June 25, 1940 in Honolulu – February 8, 2020) was an American martial arts practitioner, author, and founder of the Wadokai Aikido.

== Early life ==
As a child in Hawaii, Suenaka suffered from severe asthma, which was treated by his grandfather with reiki. He began martial arts training with his father, Warren Suenaka, from an early age, learning the family styles of jiujitsu and kenjitsu. Suenaka credits this training with the remission of his asthma.

As well as training with his father, Suenaka also studied under Henry Okazaki and James Mitose. He also studied judo. Suenaka attended Koichi Tohei's aikido demonstrations in 1953, and at his father's behest began training primarily in that art. He also took up the study of kendo in 1955.

== Military career ==
In 1958, Suenaka enlisted in the United States Air Force. In 1960, although he originally planned on becoming a pilot, he put this on hold to go to Japan to study under O'Sensei. He worked primarily as an electrician and engineer. At his request, he was transferred in 1961 to Tachikawa Air Base in Japan, which enabled him to study directly under Morihei Ueshiba at the Hombu dojo in Tokyo.

Effectively employed as the personal electrician of his commanding officer, Suenaka was able to subcontract most of his work to the barracks houseboy. This enabled him to spend most of his time in Japan living and training at the Hombu dojo. He also spent time training at the Kodokan under Kyuzo Mifune.

In 1961 he was transferred again to Naha, Okinawa. At the airbase there, he set up his own dojo, and aikido became popular with the servicemen stationed there.

== Wadokai Aikido ==
Wadokai Aikido is an aikido organization founded by Suenaka in 1975 and it is based in Charleston, South Carolina. Wadokai teaches Suenaka-ha Tetsugaku-ho Aikido, which means "Suenaka style, philosophical way." Wadokai Aikido has dojo throughout the United States and China. Suenaka was a 1st generation student of aikido founder Morihei Ueshiba. Originally organised as "Aikidos" American International Ki Development and Philosophical Society, Wadokai Aikido teaches a method of aikido that is both martial and spiritual. This philosophy is where the term "Complete Aikido" comes from.

Suenaka held ranks in the following martial arts:

- Hachidan (8th degree black belt) in Aikido awarded 1977
- Hachidan (8th degree black belt) in Matsumura Seito Hakutsuru Shorin Ryu Karatedo & Kobudo awarded 1977
- Rokudan (6th degree black belt) in Matsumura Seito Hakutsuru Shorin Ryu Karatedo & Kobudo, awarded by Hakutsuru Shorin Ryu founder Hokan Soken, in 1972
- Sandan (3rd degree black belt) in Kodokan Judo and Jiu Jitsu (dual certificate), awarded by Kazuo Ito and Risei Kano, son of judo founder Jigoro Kano, in 1970
- Nidan (2nd degree black belt) in Kendo, awarded by Shuji Mikami in 1958
- Hawaiian State Golden Gloves Boxing from 1954 to 1958
