= Pressure point =

Points on body used in traditional Chinese and Ayurvedic medicine

Pressure point (穴位)
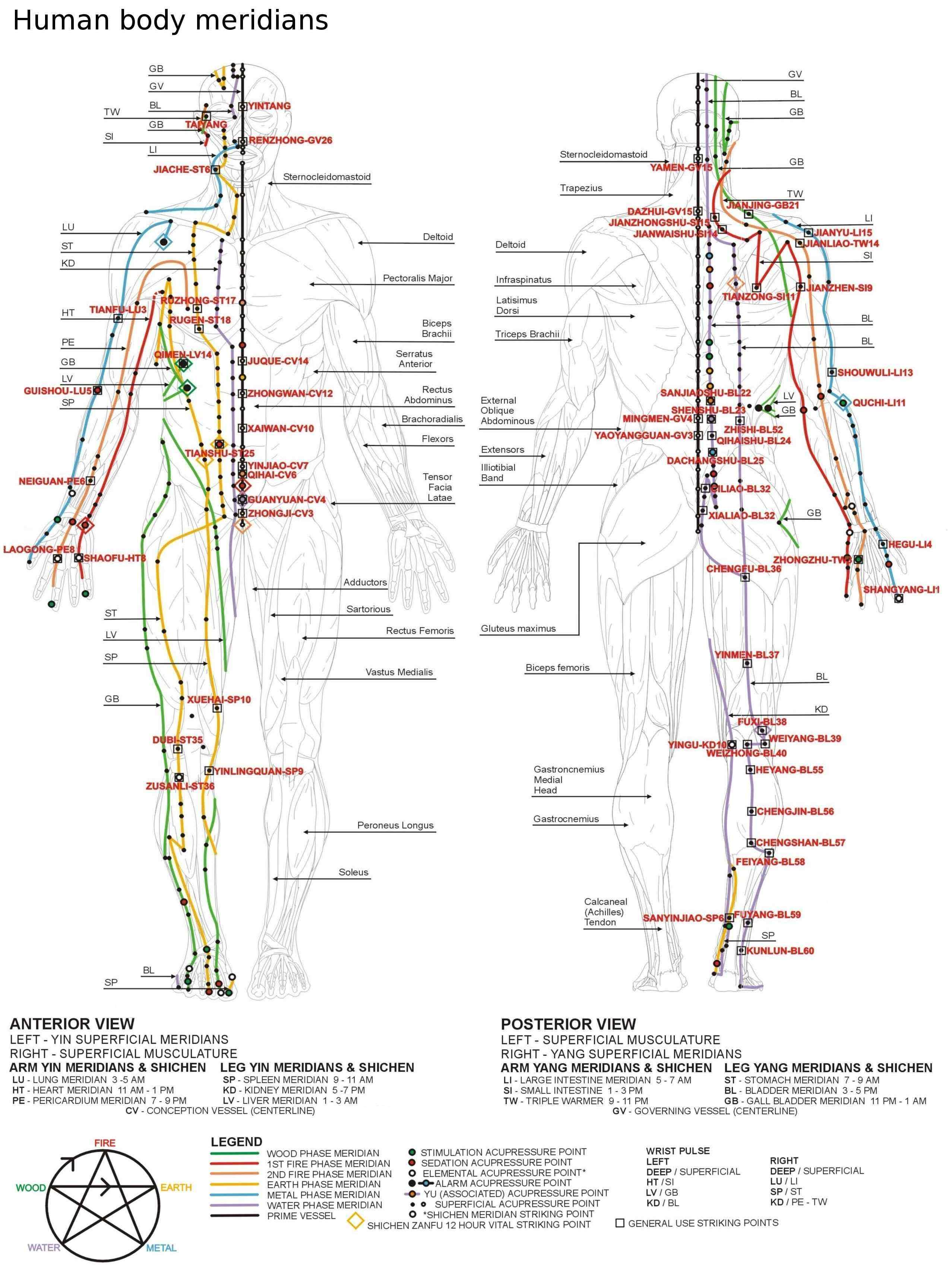

Chinese name
- Chinese: 穴位
Transcriptions
Standard Mandarin
- Hanyu Pinyin: xuéwèi
- Bopomofo: ㄒㄩㄝˊ ㄨㄟˋ
- Wade–Giles: hsüeh-wei
Wu
- Romanization: yiuih^{入} we^{去}
Hakka
- Romanization: hied^{5} vi^{55}
Yue: Cantonese
- Jyutping: jyut^{6} wai^{6*2}
Southern Min
- Hokkien POJ: hia̍t-uī

Japanese name
- Kanji: 急所
- Kana: きゅうしょ
Transcriptions
- Romanization: kyūsho

Pressure points (Note: Chinese: 穴位; pinyin: xuéwèi; Japanese: 急所, romanized: kyūsho, lit. 'tender spot'; Sinhala: නිල/මර්ම ස්ථාන, romanized: Nila/Marma Sthana (in Angampora); Telugu: మర్మ స్థానం, romanized: Marma Sthanam; Malayalam: മര്‍മ്മം, romanized: marmam; Tamil: வர்மம், romanized: varmam) are areas of the human body that may produce significant pain or other effects when manipulated in a specific manner. They are related to the supposed meridian points in Traditional Chinese Medicine, Indian Ayurveda and Siddha medicine, and martial arts.

== History ==
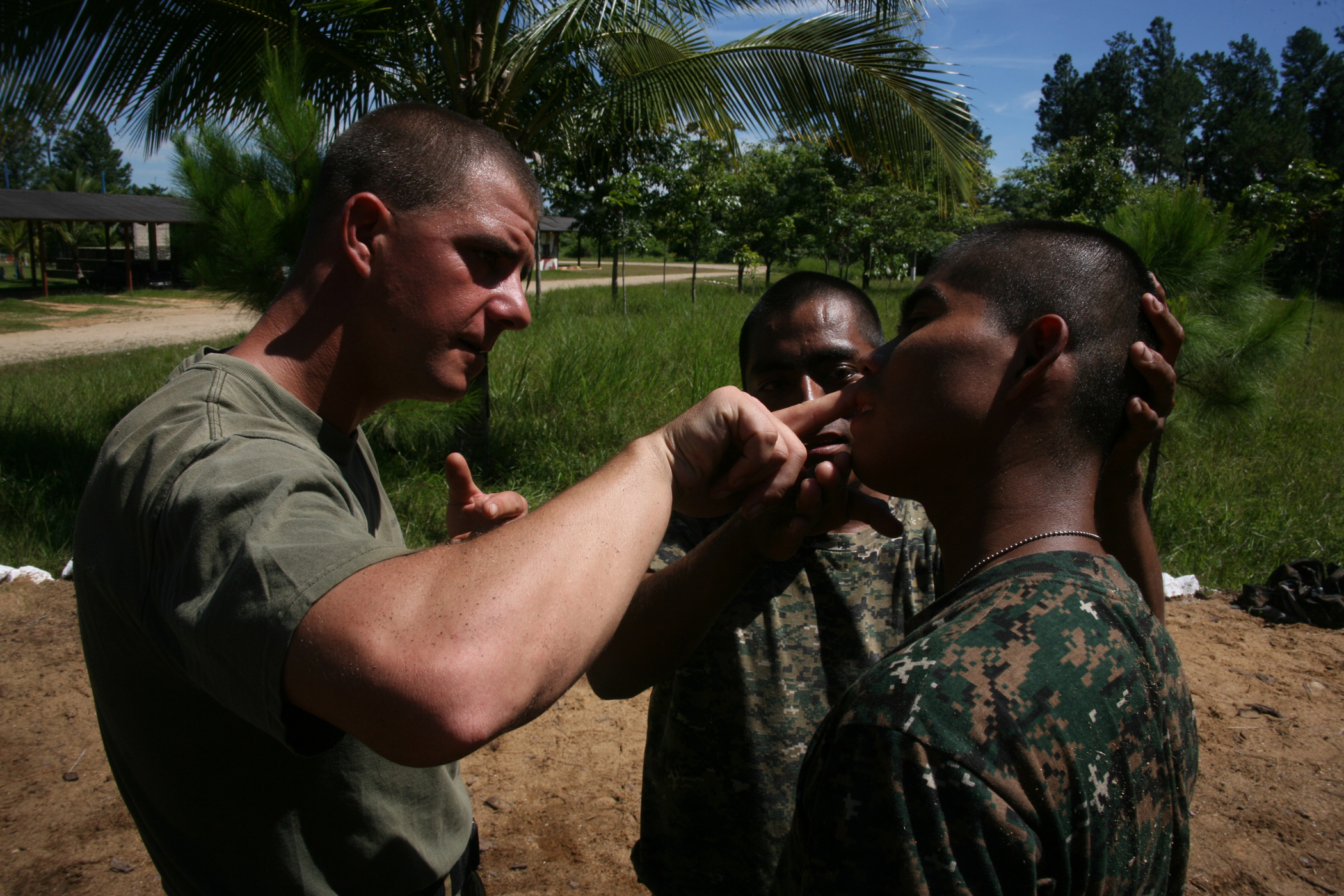
Muscular gouging techniques demonstration by a Marine Corps Martial Arts instructor

The earliest known concept of pressure points can be seen in the South Indian Varma kalai based on Siddha. The concept of pressure points is also present in the old school Japanese martial arts; in a 1942 article in the Shin Budo magazine, Takuma Hisa asserted the existence of a tradition attributing the first development of pressure-point attacks to Shinra Saburō Minamoto no Yoshimitsu (1045–1127).

Hancock and Higashi (1905) published a book which pointed out a number of vital points in Japanese martial arts.

Accounts of pressure-point fighting appeared in Chinese Wuxia fiction novels and became known by the name of Dim Mak, or "Death Touch", in western popular culture in the 1960s.

While it is undisputed that there are sensitive points on the human body where even comparatively weak pressure may induce significant pain or serious injury, the association of kyūsho with notions of death have been harshly criticized.

== See also ==
- Chakra
- Dantian
- Nociception
