= Chogi Kishaba =

Okinawan martial artist

- Born: 1934
- Died: October 20, 2017
- Other names: Choji Kishaba
- Style: Gōjū-ryū, Yamane Ryu
- Teachers: Chōjun Miyagi, Masami Chinen

Other information
- Notable students: Toshihiro Oshiro, Maeda Kiyomasa, Kiyoshi Nishime

Chogi Kishaba (喜舎場 朝義, Kishaba Chōgi), also Choji Kishaba, (1934 - October 20, 2017) was an Okinawan martial arts master and founder of the Ryukyu Bujutsu Kenkyu Doyukai (RBKD).

Kishaba's older brother, Chokei Kishaba, was also an Okinawan martial arts master.

== Ryukyu Bujutsu Kenkyu Doyukai ==
Kishaba was one of the very few remaining practitioners of Yamane Ryu in Okinawa. In Toshihiro Oshiro founded the RBKD, an organization dedicated to the research and development of Okinawan Martial Arts. Oshiro's dojo is located in San Mateo, California.

== See also ==
- Okinawan martial arts
