= Shōshin Nagamine =

Okinawan karateka (1907–1997)

- Shōshin Nagamine, sitting in the lotus position
- Born: 15 July 1907; Naha, Okinawa, Japan
- Died: 2 November 1997 (aged 90); Naha, Okinawa, Japan
- Native name: 長嶺 将真
- Style: Matsubayashi-ryu
- Teachers: Taro Shimabuku, Ankichi Arakaki, Chotoku Kyan, Motobu Choki, Kotatsu Iha
- Rank: Hanshi, 10th Dan

Other information
- Notable students: Seigi Nakamura, Takayoshi Nagamine, Katsuhiko Shinzato, Taba Kensei

Shōshin Nagamine (長嶺 将真, Nagamine Shōshin; 15 July 1907 – 2 November 1997) was an Okinawa karate master as well as a soldier, police superintendent, assemblyman of Naha City between 1953 and 1957, play director and author.

== Early life and karate-do ==
Nagamine was born in Tomari, in Naha, Okinawa. He was a small and sickly child, and he contracted a gastroenteric disorder in 1926, his second year of high school. He began a self-imposed diet and took up karate under the watchful eye of his next-door neighbour, Chojin Kuba. Nagamine soon became a picture of good health, crediting his recovery to "hard work both at school and training of Karate". His health improved to such an extent that he became a leader of the school's karate club, and his friends dubbed him Chippaii Matsu, a nickname meaning "tenacious pine tree".

== Career in the army ==
After graduation in March 1928, he began to study martial arts full-time, moving to Shuri and training under Zenryo Shimabukuro (島袋善良) and Ankichi Arakaki. Later that year, he was conscripted into the Japanese army in the 47th Infantry Regiment, and fought in China for the Jinan incident before receiving an honourable discharge in 1931.

Leaving the army, Nagamine sought an area in which his martial arts abilities would be useful, eventually settling on the police force.

== Career in the police force ==
During his time as a police officer, Nagamine received further instruction in karate from Chotoku Kyan and Motobu Choki, and achieved the title of Renshi in 1940. By 1951, Nagamine was a Police Superintendent, of Motobu, and was training his own officers in karate.

Nagamine retired as a policeman in 1952, and in 1953 he returned to Naha City and set up his own dojo, which he named "Matsubayashi-Ryu Kodokan Karate and Ancient Martial Arts Studies". From the dojo he taught Matsubayashi-ryu, a karate school he had founded in 1947, and named in honour of Sokon Matsumura and Kosaku Matsumora. He continued to teach the discipline until his death in 1997. He was succeeded in 1997 by his son, Takayoshi Nagamine, who returned to Okinawa after many years teaching in the US, and who was the head (sōke) of Matsubayashi-ryu until his own death in 2012.

== Author ==
Nagamine wrote two books in Japanese, The Essence of Okinawan Karate-Do and Tales of Okinawa's Great Masters. The Essence of Okinawan Karate-Do, which has been reprinted many times, was first published in the English language in 1976. This was translated into the English language by Nagamine's student Katsuhiko Shinzato. Tales of Okinawa's Great Masters was translated into the English language by Patrick McCarthy [Bubishi], and published in 2000, by Charles Tuttle.
