= Yamanni ryu =

Form of Okinawan kobudō martial art

Yamanni-ryū/Yamane-ryu
- Yamanni-ryū patch
- Also known as: Yamanni-Chinen-ryu, Yamane Ryu
- Focus: Okinawan kobudō and notably Bōjutsu
- Country of origin: Okinawa Prefecture, Japan
- Creator: Sanda Chinen, Masami Chinen
- Famous practitioners: Chogi Kishaba, Toshihiro Oshiro, Higa Seitoku

Yamanni-ryū (山根流) (also Yamanni-Chinen-ryū and Yamane Ryu) is a form of Okinawan kobudō whose main weapon is the bo, a non-tapered, cylindrical staff. In recent years the smaller buki, such as sai, tunfa (or tonfa), nunchaku, and kama (weapon) are studied as secondary weapons.

== Lineage ==
Tradition maintains that Sakugawa Kanga, entrusted with the protection of prominent Ryūkyū families, had studied the art in China. Later he lived in Akata village in Shuri, Okinawa. Sakugawa developed the style in the late 18th century. He passed it on to the Chinen family, beginning with Chinen Umikana. Sanda Chinen (1842–1925), also known as Yamani USUMEI and Yamane TANMEI, introduced the "bouncing" motion of the staff which is the style's hallmark. His grandson, Masami Chinen, named the style after him. Masami Chinen's grandnephew Teruo Chinen was the last family member to practice the style.

== Bugeikan Yamane-ryu ==
Higa Seitoku started to train in Yamane-ryu in 1956 after completing his study of karate under Kishimoto Soko. He was the only person to receive an official license in bōjutsu by the founder of Yamane-ryu, Chinen Masami. To this day the same kata and techniques are transmitted in the Bugeikan dojo founded by Higa Seitoku in Okinawa and currently run by his son and nephews. While at the Bugeikan a variety of weapons are practiced the Yamane-ryu curriculum only encompasses bō Kata.

== Ryūkyū Bujutsu Kenkyu Doyukai / Kishaba-Ha Yamanni-Ryu ==
In 1979 Chogi Kishaba, a student of Masami Chinen, sent his students, Toshihiro Oshiro and Kiyoshi Nishime, to the United States. In 1985 they founded the Ryūkyū Bujutsu Kenkyu Doyukai or RBKD (Association for the Study and Research of Okinawan Martial Arts) for the purpose of bringing Yamanni-ryū to the West. Kishaba is the head of the RBKD. Shihan Oshiro (8th dan, Yamanni-ryū; 9th dan, Shōrin-ryū) was the Chief Instructor of RBKD USA and its West Coast Director, he returned to Okinawa to live and teaches out of the Naha Budokan. The Midwest Director is Kiyoshi Nishime. Oshiro and Nishime give seminars in Yamanni-ryū in the U.S. and around the world. This branch of the style is referred too as Yamane-Kishaba-Ryu or Kishaba-ha Yamanni-Ryu. The RBKD Yamanni-ryū patch is based on an Okinawan mon. It is similar to the mon of the Takeda clan.

Kata of RBKD:

- Donyukon Ichi,
- Donyukon Ni,
- Choun No Kun Sho,
- Choun No Kun Dai,
- Shuji no Kun Sho,
- Shuji no Kun Dai,
- Ryubi no kon,
- Sakugawa No Kun
- Shirataru no Kun,
- Tomari Shirataru no Kun,
- Yunigawa no Kun / Yonegawa no Kun / Hidari Bo,
- Shinakachi no Kun / Sunakake no Kun,
- Chikin Bo / Tsuken Bo

== Maeda Dojo Yamane-Ryu ==
Maeda Kiyomasa was a senior student of Kishaba Chogi and was promoted to 9th Dan in Yamane-Ryu by Kishaba. The Kanbun (Sign) for the Yamane-Ryu Hombu dojo was gifted to Maeda by Kishaba upon his passing. Maeda Kiyomasa is also president of the Okinawa Shogen-Ryu Karate-Do Association, and Yamane ryu is taught is parallel to Shogen-ryu karate at the dojo.

Kata of Maeda Dojo:

- Choun No Kon Ichi,
- Choun No Kon Ni,
- Shushi No Kon,
- Sunakake No Kon,
- Shirotaro No Kon,
- Tomari Shirotaro No Kon

== Oshiro-ha Yamane Ryu (大城派山根流) ==
Oshiro-ha Yamane-ryu Kobudo/大城派山根流古武道]

Oshiro-ha Yamane-ryu Kobudo [大城派山根流古武道] is a contemporary interpretation of classical Yamane-ryu tradition created by Patrick McCarthy, which can be best described as either Sogo Budo (総合武道) or Gendai Budo (現代武道). The principal source, under which Patrick McCarthy's Okinawan instructor [Kinjo Hiroshi] studied, was Oshiro Chojo/大城朝恕 [1887-1935]. In addition to his ardour for Karate, Oshiro is best remembered for his highly rated skill with the Rokushaku bo/六尺棒. Because of its roots and legacy from Oshiro, and with the blessings of Kinjo Sensei, the name Oshiro-ha Yamane-ryu Kobudo was chosen.

Lineage

Patrick McCarthy's Kobudo practice was inspired by the teachings of his Okinawan instructor, Kinjo Hiroshi [金城 裕, 1919-2013], and key figures under whom he studied; Chinen Sandā [知念三良, 1842–1925], Ōshiro Chōjo [大城朝怒, 1887-1935], and Maeshiro Chōtoku [真栄城朝亮, 1909-1979]. Amidst other pioneers, these people were pivotal figures before the style gained official recognition as "Yamane Ryu/山根流棒術" by Chinen's grandson, Masami [知念正実, 1898–1976].

The style is also influenced by Chinen Masami Yamane Ryu Bojutsu[棒術], since McCarthy practiced with instructors including Shinzato Katsuhiko, Kishaba, Oshiro Toshihiro, and Nishime Kiyoshi in the mid-1980s. However, Oshiro-ha Yamane Ryu is not connected to the Chinen Masami Yamane Ryu Bojutsu[棒術] lineage, since the style includes a wider range of traditional weapons than Masami’s original practice. These additional weapons include the Eku, Nicho-gama, Nunchaku, Sai, Suruchin, Tanbo, Tanto, Tekko, Tinbe, and Tonfa.

The practical, technical and pedagogical approach to learning, practice and teaching McCarthy Sensei established stemmed from; #1. A strong foundation in Okinawan Kobudo gained under the tutelage of Grandmaster Richard Kim [1917-2001, Zen Bei Butokukai] and #2. Years of historical study and cross-training opportunities in related arts, and often with the senior authorities of various Kobudo traditions; i.e., having studied directly under Richard Kim [1917-2001], Inoue Motokatsu [1918-1992] and Kinjo Hiroshi [1919-2013]. Other direct influence through research and training came from other notable instructors; i.e. Sakagami Ryusho [1915-1993], Matayoshi Shinpo [1922-1997], Akamine Eisuke [1925-1998], Kuniba Shogo [1935-1992], Shimabuku Eizo [1925-2017], Hayashi Teruo [1924-2004], Nakamoto Masahiro [1938] and Inoue Motokatsu [1918-1993].

Sogo Budo (総合武道) ~ Gendai Budo (現代武道)

Budo (総合武道) is a term which refers to integrated or comprehensive fighting art[s]. While carrying a similar meaning, Gendai Budo (現代武道) is a term which refers to modern or contemporary fighting art[s]. By collectively bringing together his many years of experience to establish an integrated and contemporary practice, which better suited McCarthy Sensei's personal preferences, the practice was intended to pay homage to his instructor[s], under whom he was empowered, along with paying homage to both the tradition and culture from which it comes.

Oshiro-ha Yamane Ryu Kobudo Curriculum

As previously mentioned; Oshiro-ha Yamane Ryu Kobudo includes the following practices: Bo, Eku, Nicho-gama, Nunchaku, Sai, Suruchin, Tanbo, Tanto, Tekko/Techu, Tinbe and Tonfa-jutsu, etc.

Bō Kata of Oshiro-ha Yamane-ryu:

- Shuji No Kun
- Sakugawa No Kun
- Yonegawa No Kun
- Shirotaru No Kun
- Chinen Shikiyanaka No Kun
- Koryu No Kun

== See also ==
- Bōjutsu
