= Vic Moore =

American karateka

- Born: August 23, 1943 (age 82); Cincinnati, Ohio
- Style: Shuri-ryū Karate, Kempo Karate, Shotokan Karate, Chito-Ryu
- Teachers: Robert Trias, William J. Dometrich, Ronald Williams, Barry Yasuto
- Rank: 10th dan black belt in Shuri-ryū; 10 th dan black belt in Kempo; 1st dan black belt in Shotokan; 3 dan black belt in Chito-Ryu

Other information
- Notable students: Chisato Mishima

Victor Moore (born August 23, 1943) is an American martial artist who holds a 10th Degree Black Belt in Karate and was one of the late Robert Trias' Chief instructors of the Shuri-ryū Karate system. Moore was one of the first ten original members of the Trias International Society and also studied and trained with William J. Dometrich in the style of Chito-ryu. Moore has studied martial arts for over 50 years, and is a four-time world karate champion.

== History ==
Moore began to travel with a handful of his students to several tournaments as far away as Canada. He later ventured out opening karate schools throughout the Cincinnati area and began traveling the Midwest and East coast. Being successful in competition, he meets the father of American Karate Robert A. Trias. Robert Trias with his skills and ability took Moore under his wings. He continued to train with Trias at various tournaments and seminars, learning the Kenpo and Goju-Ryu styles of Karate, Moore traveled many times to the USKA headquarters in Phoenix, Arizona where he had received rank up through his Masters level while in the USKA. Trias taught many style, but his main style was Shuri-Ryu. While Moore spent time in the USKA, Maung Gyi took him under his wings, taking him as a personal student. Gyi taught him Bando, stick fighting, and all the various weapons too numerous to name. Gyi was also Moore's kickboxing instructor, teaching Moore all the moves of thai boxing. Later, Vic Moore and Joe Lewis introduced kickboxing to America on the Merv Griffin TV show in 1973. Moore and Joe Lewis were the first to introduce kickboxing on national TV and were some of the first professional kickboxers in the United States. Jim Harrison defeated Moore in the first kickboxing tournament in the United States. Law Officer's get their first training manual by Harold Long of Tennessee and Victor Moore of Ohio and Hulon Willis of Virginia by order of Robert A. Trias of Arizona. Vic Moore gives seminar's all over the US and lives in Lumberton, NC where he teaches privately from his home.

== Martial arts pioneer ==
- One of the first African-Americans to win a major karate competition (1965 USKA Grand Nationals).
- First kickboxing championship (1971 U.S. Kickboxing Championships) with Jim Harrison.
- Introduced kickboxing to America with Joe Lewis in 1973 on Merv Griffin.
- Black Karate feature film with Jim McLain and Robert Trias
- Formed the WKA organization in 1974

== Competition ==
Moore has fought some of the top fighters in the world and also competed against Michael G. Foster (Miami 1965), Mike Stone, Jim 'Ronin' Harrison, Fred Wren, Chuck Norris, and Joe Lewis.

== World championships ==
1. 1966 Defeating the all Hawaiian champion in Richmond Virginia.
2. 1968 Defeating Joe Lewis at the World's Fair Karate Championships.
3. 1969 Defeating Mike Stone in Pasadena California for the light heavyweight championship at the world teams championship.
4. 1970 Defeated the legendary Bill “Superfoot” Wallace to win the USKA first professional world championship.

Moore placed in every tournament he competed in from 1965 to 1975 when he retired from competition.

== Speed Test Drill and Controversy ==
In 1967 Vic Moore appeared at the Long Beach International Karate Championships in Long Beach, California and participated in a martial arts speed drill against Jeet Kune Do founder and movie star, Bruce Lee. The point of the speed drill challenge was to stop Lee's famous unstoppable punch. Lee told Moore that he was going to throw a straight punch to the face, and all he had to do was to try to block it. Lee took several steps back and asked if Moore was ready. When Moore nodded in affirmation, Lee glided towards him until he was within striking range. He then threw a straight punch directly at Moore's face, and stopped before impact. In eight attempts, Moore allegedly failed to block any of the punches.

In contrast, Moore and Grandmaster Steve Mohammed said that Lee had first told Moore that he was going to throw a straight punch to the body, which Moore blocked. Lee attempted another punch, and Moore blocked it as well. The third punch, which Lee threw to Moore's face, did not come nearly within striking distance. Moore claims that Lee never successfully struck Moore but Moore was able to strike Lee on two successful attempts, immediately after Lee had made the three attempts described above. Moore further claims that Bruce Lee said he was the fastest American he's ever seen and that Lee's media crew repeatedly played the one punch towards Moore's face that did not come within striking range, allegedly in an attempt to give the impression that Lee had thrown eight successive punches and thereby preserve Lee's superstar image.

In response to Moore and Mohammed's claims, Chuck Sullivan, who is the Senior Grandmaster of the International Karate Connection Association (IKCA) and who witnessed the event, recalled in an interview on Viking Samurai’s YouTube channel that Moore failed to block all incoming punches and never struck back at Bruce Lee. In the middle of the interview, the channel host called Moore by phone to confront him with Chuck's testimony. Moore stood by his claims and further asserted that Bruce Lee actually cried after failing to block his punches, an event that Sullivan categorically denied witnessing.
