= Tsuyoshi Chitose =

Okinawan karateka

Tsuyoshi Chitose 千歳 剛直
- Chitose in Peggy's Cove, Nova Scotia
- Born: October 18, 1898; Naha, Okinawa, Empire of Japan
- Died: June 6, 1984 (aged 85); Kumamoto, Japan
- Style: Chitō-ryū Karate (founder); Okinawan martial arts (Naha-te, Shuri-te, and Tomari-te), Judo, Kendo
- Teachers: Seishō Arakaki, Kanryo Higaonna, Chōtoku Kyan, Hanashiro Chomo, Choyu Motobu, Sanda Chinen
- Rank: Sōke, Founder of Chitō-ryū, Hanshi - Zen Okinawa Karate Kobudo Rengokai; 10th Dan Karate; 6th Dan Judo; 4th Dan Kendo

Other information
- Notable students: Yasuhiro Chitose, Masami Tsuruoka, Thomas Morita, Mamarou Yamamoto, William Dometrich, Henry Slomanski, Ken Sakamoto

Tsuyoshi Chitose (千歳 剛直, Chitose Tsuyoshi; October 18, 1898 – June 6, 1984) (Okinawan: Chinen Gua) was an Okinawan martial artist who founded the Chitō-ryū school of karate by blending Shuri-te, Tomari-te, and Naha-te.

== Life ==
=== Early life and training ===
Chitose was born on October 18, 1898, in the town of Kumochi, Naha City, Okinawa Prefecture. He came from a martial arts lineage—his maternal grandfather was Matsumura Sōkon (松村 宗棍). While in Okinawa, Chitose grew up studying the art of karate (唐手, Tang hand), now written 空手 (empty hand), as well as kobudō. Due partially to his maternal grandfather's influence Chitose was afforded the opportunity to train under some of the preeminent masters of the day. He would first begin his training under the tutelage of Seishō Arakaki in 1905 at the age of seven. During this his first seven years he was taught the basics and just one single kata Sanchin. He would continue training under Arakaki further learning the kata Unsū, Niseishi, Seisan, and possibly Shihōhai; until around 1913 or 1914 when they split seemly over a personal dispute. Following this he would train under several other masters most notably Higaonna Kanryō (learning Saifa, Sepai, Kururunfa, Tensho), Chōtoku Kyan (learning Ananku, Chintō, Kūsankū, and Passai), Choyu Motobu (learning Wansu), Hanashiro Chomo (learning Jion), and Sanda Chinen (learning Bōjutsu, and Kobudō). While under these masters tutelage he was a co-student to many future greats of the karate world including Kenwa Mabuni (Founder of Shitō-ryū), Chōjun Miyagi (founder of Gōjū-ryū), Juhatsu Kyoda (founder of Tōon-ryū), Ankichi Arakaki, and Masami Chinen (Founder of Yamanni ryu). During his formative years another karate great Gichin Funakoshi (Founder of Shotokan) was his elementary school teacher and also in this class were schoolmates Gigō Funakoshi and Shōshin Nagamine (founder of Matsubayashi-ryū).

=== Time in Tokyo ===
In March 1921 the Crown Prince of Japan Hirohito made a visit to Okinawa. During this visit Chitose was asked to be a part of a karate demonstration along with several other respected masters of the day. After this Chitose would move to Tokyo to study medicine at University of Tokyo. While studying he was invited by his respected senior Gichin Funakoshi to help teach karate at his Keio University karate club the first of its kind in Japan. He would continue teaching here for the full duration of his time in Tokyo. While instructing there he would help teach several important karateka including Isao Obata, Masatoshi Nakayama, Yasuhiro Konishi, and Shigeru Egami. Once he completed his medical training he would establish a practice in Tokyo focusing mainly in gynecology. While still training and teaching karate he sought out other martial arts masters of the day. He would study judo with Kyuzo Mifune, kendo and iaido with Nakayama Hakudō, and also had a friendship with aikido founder Morihei Ueshiba. He would remain in Tokyo until 1932 when he join Imperial Japanese Army Medical Corps.

=== In China ===
From 1932 until the end of WWII Chitose would serve in the Imperial Japanese Army Medical Corps where he would retire as a Major. Most notably during this time he was stationed in a small village in China. While there he would treat and befriend many of the local people. When they discovered that he was a martial artist they introduced him to an old kung fu teacher from the neighboring area. He would train under this teacher during his time stationed at the village and some of his teachings would go on to influence some of Chitose's karate.

=== Return to Japan and founding Chito-Ryu ===
In 1944 Chitose was stationed at the military preparatory school located in Kumamoto as an officer-in-training. He would reside in his future in-laws home there. By 1945 after the war had finished he had lost all of his teachers either from the war or natural causes. In 1946 Chitose would open his first dojo Yoseikan in Kikuchi, Kumamoto. Within this new dojo he would begin to train a fresh batch of new students using his understanding of physiology to adjust traditional techniques to make them both more effective and less detrimental to the bodies of long-term practitioners. He would later host a karate and kobudo tournament at the Kumamoto Kubukiza to raise money for the impoverished people of his homeland in Okinawa. In 1948 Chitose would help to found the Zen Nihon Karate-do Renmei (全日本空手道連盟, All Japan Karate-do Federation); along with Gichin Funakoshi, Kenwa Mabuni, and Sekō Higa, and Kanken Tōyama; serving as the President of the Kyushu region. It was around this time that he would finally settle on a name for his style Chitō-ryū, the name of the style translates as: chi (千) - 1,000; tō (唐) - China; ryū (流) - style, school, "1,000 year old Chinese style." The character tō (唐) refers to the Tang dynasty of China.

=== U.S. Military and spreading the style ===
In 1946 American GIs and Japanese got into a brawl in the busy Shopping and Entertainment district of Kumamoto City. Dr. Chitose found himself squarely in the middle of this conflict, and after being struck by an unknown brawler he would defend himself wherein he would beat up several of them. Two or three days following this event Chitose was visited by U.S. Military Police. He was convinced that due to his actions in harming several U.S. servicemen he would be taken to jail, but after speaking to the M.P.s about karate and the skills he used to defeat them he was instead asked to teach the servicemen. In 1951 he was officially made a karate instructor for U.S. Military at Camp Wood in Kumamoto. At first Chitose was not too keen on teaching the Westerners but after a few started showing some promise and dedication he quickly warmed to them, becoming one of the earliest teachers of karate to Western people. Some notable students from his days teaching at Camp Wood include William Dometrich (first Caucasian student and founder of the United States Karatedo Federation), Henry Slomanski (1953 Karate Champion of Japan. former International Commissioner of Karate in the United States), Wallace Reumann (founder American Karate Federation), Robert Wightman, Warren Pochinski, Arby Edwards, and Roger Warren among several others. With the servicemen returning home as well as a few of his other senior students such as Masami Tsuruoka (father of Karate in Canada) and Thomas Morita, the teachings of Chitose quickly began to spread in North America. Tsuruoka headed up things in Canada while initially Morita would lead Chito-Ryu in the U.S.A. before Chitose decided to hand the reins to Dometrich.

In late fall 1961 Dr. Chitose would make his first of several trips outside of Japan. Tom Morita, James Miyaji, and Wilfred Ho were part of the group to sponsor this 4-5 month visit to Hawaii but disagreements among them caused the trip to be cut short by April 1962. Later that same year Chitose would visit Canada for the first time, visiting his student Tsuruoka's Hombu Dojo. While there Dometrich would come up from Kentucky to visit his sensei for the first time in nearly eight years. In 1967 for the Canadian Centennial it was decided that the government would sponsor the Canadian Karate Championship. Tsuruoka (then president of Karate Canada) invited Dr. Chitose, along with Dometrich, Mamoru Yamamoto (All-Japan Karate Champion 1958-1960 and later founder of Yoshukai Karate) and some of his students including Mike Foster, to Canada, where they conducted demonstrations, a clinic, and presided over the Karate tournament. The event was held at the Japanese Canadian Cultural Centre's Nisei Karate Club. After this Chitose and Yamamoto toured the US and Canada meeting and training many Chito-ryu students.

=== Latter years and death ===
In 1975 Chitose would move his Sohobu dojo to its current location in Tsuboi, Chūō-ku, Kumamoto, Japan. He would continue to travel and dedicate himself to the training of Chito-Ryu practitioners around the world. By the early 1980s it was clear that his health was in decline, but he remained steadfast in his training and teaching, though he would need somewhat frequent rests. Dr. Tsuyoshi Chitose would pass away on the 6th June 1984 at the age of 86. He would leave behind his wife, seven children, and many grandchildren.

== Successor ==
In August 1984 Chitose's son Yasuhiro Chitose would become the second generation Soke of Chito-Ryu Karate taking on his father's name. Though this was near universally accepted early on several senior instructors chose to break away from the International Chito-Ryu Karate Federation (ICKF) with examples including William Dometrich (United States Chitō-ryū Karate Federation), Shane Higashi (World Chito-Ryu Karate-Do Federation), and Brain Hayes (Australian Chitokai Karate Association); while others chose to create totally new styles of Karate with Chito-Ryu as a base such as Masami Tsuruoka (Tsuruoka Karate), Mamoru Yamamoto (Yoshukai Karate), and even Dr. Chitose son in law Ken Sakamoto (Ryusei Karate).

== Legacy ==
At its peak Chito-ryu had over 40,000 practitioners on four continents. Chitose is seen today as one of the old masters of Okinawan Karate and someone who helped spread karate around the globe.

== Writings ==
- Kempo Karate-dō — Universal Art of Self-Defense (拳法空手道一般の護身術) by Tsuyoshi Chitose, ISBN 0-9687791-0-7.
