= Masami Tsuruoka =

Canadian karateka

- Born: January 12, 1929; Cumberland, British Columbia, Canada
- Died: October 10, 2014 (aged 85); Mississauga, Ontario, Canada
- Other names: Mas Tsuruoka
- Style: Chito-ryu, Tsuruoka Ryu, karate
- Teacher: Tsuyoshi Chitose
- Rank: 10th dan

Other information
- Notable students: Shane Higashi
- Website: tsuruokakarate.com

Masami Tsuruoka (鶴岡政己, Tsuruoka; January 12, 1929 – October 10, 2014), OOnt was a Japanese Canadian karate instructor and practitioner recognized as "The Father of Canadian Karate" by Black Belt Magazine. Although mainly responsible for establishing the Chito-ryu style in Canada, Tsuruoka is also known as founder of his own karate style known as Tsuruoka Ryu.

Masami Tsuruoka kept Chito-ryu karate before the Canadian public from 1958 to 1968 through newspaper articles, magazine articles, and frequent public appearances, demonstrations and exhibitions across Canada. He formed the National Karate Association of Canada (presently called Karate Canada) in 1964, followed by the Tsuruoka Karate-do Federation in 1979. Tsuruoka was appointed a member of the Order of Ontario in 1998 for his significant contribution to martial arts.

== Early years ==
Mas Tsuruoka was born in Cumberland, British Columbia. The Tsuruoka family, as was standard with Japanese families living in Canada at that time, was placed in 'Internment Camps' during World War II, first in Tashimi, B.C., and later at Roseberry. In 1945, after the end of World War II, Tsuruoka moved with his father to Japan and at age seventeen (1946) began the study of Chito-ryu karate in Kumamoto, Japan, under Dr. Tsuyoshi Chitose. He received his first degree black belt at age twenty (1949), and after continuing his study and receiving his third degree black belt, moved back to Canada in 1956.

When Tsuruoka began studying with Chitose, karate was at the point where two eras crossed, the old ways of Okinawa and the new ways of post-war Japan. Tsuruoka was one of the first students of the group that was to reshape modern karate.

== Canadian Chito-Ryu ==
Although Tsuruoka first began teaching judo, in 1957 he also began teaching karate in a small gym on Danforth Avenue in Toronto, Ontario. In 1958, he rented a larger space and established the first karate dojo in Canada.

In 1962 Tsuyoshi Chitose recognized Tsuruoka's accomplishments by appointing him as Chief Representative of Chito-ryu karate in Canada. In 1967 as part of his efforts to promote Chito-ryu karate in Canada, Tsuruoka invited Dr. Chitose, along with Mamoru Yamamoto, later noted as founder of Yoshukai Karate, and some of his students including Mike Foster, to Canada, where they conducted demonstrations, a clinic, and presided over the Canadian National Karate Association tournament. The event was held at the Japanese Canadian Cultural Centre's Nisei Karate Club.

During the occupation of Japan, a number of American service personnel had trained at the Yoseikan Chito-ryu ‘’hombu dojo" (headquarters) in Kumamoto. In the early sixties Tsuruoka contacted these former students in an effort to expand the Chito-ryu karate organization in North America. One of the former students was Bill Dometrich of Kentucky, who traveled to Canada to train with Tsuruoka. Dometrich was eventually appointed the Chief Representative of Chito-ryu karate in the United States.

In 1962 Tsuruoka organized the first karate tournament in Canada, "The First Canadian Karate Open Championship." In the same year he began teaching karate at the University of Toronto, which became the first university karate club in Canada, and held the first summer camp called Kamp Kamikaze in northeastern Ontario which was open to all styles of karate. In 1964 Tsuruoka founded the National Karate Association of Canada (NKA) and served as its first president. In 1967 the first inter-university karate tournament was held between Ontario universities, with the University of Toronto team winning the championship. As Chito-ryu became better established in Canada, Tsuruoka became sought after as an official for international tournaments and demonstrations. On November 16, 1973 in Rio de Janeiro, Brazil, the Pan-American Karate Union elected Masami Tsuruoka first Vice-President.

== Tsuruoka Karate-Do ==
In 1979, Masami Tsuruoka stepped down from his position as director of the Canadian Chito-kai, and with the help of his chief technical director, Ron Fagan, founded his own organization, the Tsuruoka Karate-do Federation. His former senior student, Shane Higashi, assumed leadership of the Canadian Chito-kai (Chito-ryu Karate Association). On Wednesday, May 27, 1998, Master Tsuruoka received the Order of Ontario presented by the Lieutenant Governor of Ontario, the Honourable Hilary Weston. On May 13, 2006, Tsuruoka received his 10th-Dan rank, awarded by the National Karate Association. On October 10, 2014, Tsuruoka died at the age of 85.

Tsuruoka Karate is named for it founder Masami Tsuruoka, 10th Dan. Its foundation is in Chito-Ryu and Shotokan and it blends in effective techniques from many martial arts.

== See also ==
- Chito-ryu
- Karate

== Sources ==
- Masami Tsuruoka". Shito-ryu.org. 2005. http://www.shitoryu.org/bios/tsuruoka/tsuruoka.htm. Retrieved 2010-07-20.
