= 21st Infantry Regiment (United States) =

- Coat of Arms
- Active: 1861–present
- Country: United States
- Branch: United States Army
- Type: Infantry
- Garrison/HQ: Fort Wainwright, Alaska
- Nickname: "Gimlet" (special designation)
- Mottos: Duty; Battle Cry; "Bore Brother Bore!"
- Mascot: Gimlet
- Engagements: American Civil War; Indian Wars; Spanish–American War; Siege of Santiago; Philippine–American War; World War II; Korean War; Vietnam War; Operation Iraqi Freedom; Armed Forces Expeditions – Panama; Afghanistan - OIF1/OIF2; Operation Inherent Resolve

Commanders
- Notable commanders: Frank H. Albright; Charles C. Ballou; Rapp Brush; Gilbert R. Cook; George B. Duncan; Walter H. Gordon; Charles B. Lyman; Joseph P. O'Neil; Gines Perez; Richard W. Stephens

Insignia
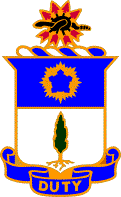
- Distinctive Unit Insignia

The 21st Infantry Regiment ("Gimlet") is a United States Army infantry regiment. The 1st Battalion currently exists as part of 1st. Infantry Brigade, 11th Airborne Division (Artic Angels) at Fort Wainwright Alaska. The regiment fought in World War II, the Korean War and the Vietnam War, as well as Operation Iraqi Freedom. Task Force Smith, the first American unit to see action in the Korean War, was derived from the regiment's 1st Battalion.

== History ==
=== Civil War ===
The 21st Infantry traces its history back to the 2nd Battalion of the 12th Infantry Regiment, formed on 3 May 1861 for the American Civil War. Companies A, B, E and G were activated at Fort Hamilton on 20 May 1862. They were sent to Harpers Ferry and on 26 May fought in a skirmish with a Confederate States Army brigade. The companies fought at the Battle of Cedar Mountain on 9 August. The companies were formed into a battalion with elements of the 8th Infantry Regiment and were the lead skirmishers of the II Corps' 2nd Division. They helped to initially break through Confederate lines, but Confederate numerical superiority forced a Union withdraw. During the retreat, the 2nd Battalion's companies suffered heavy losses while covering the retreat.

The battalion also fought at the Second Battle of Manassas and formed the rearguard during the Union retreat at that battle. The battalion then became part of V Corps and fought in the Battle of Antietam and the Battle of Fredericksburg. In March 1863, three companies of the battalion were disbanded due to a shortage of replacements. It fought in the Battle of Chancellorsville and was part of the rearguard during the retreat across the Rappahannock. The battalion then fought in the Battle of Gettysburg and suffered heavy losses. The battalion advanced southward against the retreating Confederate Army and fought in the Overland Campaign during May 1864. The battalion served at the Battle of the Wilderness, Battle of Spotsylvania Court House and the Battle of Cold Harbor. By June, the Union Army was beginning the Siege of Petersburg. The battalion fought in the siege but was combat ineffective due to losses by July. The surviving men were assigned to the 12th Infantry Regiment's 1st Battalion. By 20 September, the battalion was composed of just 48 men. It was withdrawn on 2 November and moved back to Fort Hamilton.

=== Reconstruction ===
The regiment was brought up to full strength at Fort Hamilton and moved back to Virginia for reconstruction duties by December 1865. The 2nd Battalion was stationed at Camp Winthrop, near Richmond. As part of the Army expansion in 1866, the 2nd Battalion became the 21st Infantry Regiment on 7 December 1866. In 1869, the Army was reduced in size and the 32d Infantry Regiment consolidated with the 21st. The 32d was based in the Arizona Territory and the 21st departed Richmond on 12 April. The regiment was the first military unit to be transported by the newly completed First Transcontinental railroad. Between 9 and 31 August, each company of the 21st arrived in Arizona and consolidated with the corresponding company of the 32d.

=== Indian Wars ===
In Arizona, the 21st Infantry protected transportation routes, escorted US mail deliveries, scouted Indian movements and built new wagon routes. The regiment's troops frequently clashed with Apache Indians. In 1872, the regiment was transferred to the Department of the Columbia, with the regimental headquarters located at Fort Vancouver. The companies were based at posts throughout Washington, Oregon and Idaho. In late 1872, the regiment was ordered to provide troops for the expedition against the Modoc. The regiment provided a three-company battalion, which fought in the expedition's battles between January and April 1873. B, C and F Companies fought at the First and Second Battles of the Stronghold.

In June 1877, the regiment was ordered into the field in reaction to Nez Perce massacres in Idaho. The regiment pursued the Nez Perce and fought at the Battle of the Clearwater on 11 and 12 July. The regiment continued to pursue the Indians through the Bitterroot Valley to the Bears Paw Mountains, where Chief Joseph finally surrendered. The 21st covered 1,632 miles during the campaign and suffered no desertions. In June 1878, the Bannock tribe left their reservation in southern Idaho, beginning the Bannock War. After marching 35 miles in a day, the regiment overtook the tribe on 13 August, scattering it so that it no longer posed a threat and had to return to the reservation. In June 1884, the regiment was sent to the Department of the Platte and stationed in Nebraska and Wyoming. The regiment then moved to southern Kansas to discourage a threatened Cheyenne outbreak. During the winter of 1890–91, the regiment sent six companies to the Rosebud Indian Reservation in response to Sioux unrest.

=== Spanish–American War and Philippine Insurrection ===
The regiment fought in the Spanish–American War in 1898. On 22 June 1898, the regiment fought in the attack on Santiago. It was part of the 2nd Brigade of V Corps 1st Division. On 1 July, the regiment was positioned on the left flank of the attack on San Juan Hill. The regiment helped capture the heights on 1 July after fierce fighting with Spanish troops. The Spanish troops surrendered on 16 July. Due to disease issues, the 21st Infantry was withdrawn from Cuba on 23 August.

On 18 April 1899, the regiment was sent to the Philippines to reinforce US Army units fighting against forces of the recently declared First Philippine Republic. On 13 June, the regiment fought in defense of the southern approaches to Manila. The Republic forces massed on the Zapote River, which divided the two armies on the edge of Manila Bay. The regiment faced 5,000 entrenched Republic soldiers. I and F companies skirmished with the Republic forces at a bridge over the river. The fighting then escalated into artillery duels. After several hours, the American artillery forced the Republic forces to retreat, preventing them from attacking Manila. After several defeats, the Republic forces discarded conventional tactics and began a guerrilla war in November. The regiment then fought in the pacification campaign and left the Philippines after the war was declared over on 1 June 1902.

=== Peacetime service and World War I ===
Between 1905 and 1906, the regiment returned to the Philippines for garrison duty. In 1909, the regiment went back to the Philippines for more garrison duty and stayed there until 1912. Upon its return, the 21st was garrisoned at Vancouver Barracks. From March 1916, the regiment protected the Arizona and California borders from Villista raids across the border. In December 1916, second battalion of the regiment participated in the Panama–California Exposition, defending against a simulated attack from two Navy cruisers, Frederick and San Diego, and several aircraft. In April 1917, it was transferred to Camp Kearny and was subordinated to the 16th Division's 31st Infantry Brigade. The regiment trained to fight in France with the American Expeditionary Forces, but the war ended before the division could be deployed overseas. In March 1919, the regiment returned to Vancouver Barracks.

=== Interwar and World War II ===
The 21st Infantry, less the 2nd and 3rd Battalions, was stationed at Fort George Wright, Washington, as of June 1919 as a separate regiment. The 2nd Battalion was located as follows: HQ and Company E at Fort William H. Seward, Territory of Alaska (TA); Company F at Fort Liscum, TA; Company G at Fort Gibbon, TA; Company H at Fort St. Michael, TA. The 3rd Battalion was stationed at Fort Douglas, Utah. The regiment was assigned to the Hawaiian Division on 22 October 1921; enlisted personnel stationed at Fort George Wright were transferred to the 53rd, 58th, and 59th Infantry Regiments in late September–early October 1921, while the enlisted personnel in Alaska were concurrently transferred to the 7th Infantry Regiment. The officers, records, and colors of the regiment were transferred 7 October 1921 to Schofield Barracks, Territory of Hawaii, and the regiment was reorganized 28 November 1921 at Schofield Barracks using the personnel and equipment of the inactivating 44th Infantry Regiment. It was at this point that the regiment adopted the name "Gimlet". The primary wartime mission of the 21st Infantry was to conduct a mobile defense of the beaches and inland sectors of the northern half of the island of Oahu. It was assigned on paper to the 24th Infantry Division on 26 August 1941.

After the Attack on Pearl Harbor, the regiment guarded the northern shore of Oahu from Japanese attacks. During May 1943, the division underwent combat training and departed for Australia. It arrived at Rockhampton on 8 September 1943. For the next few months, it conducted additional training in amphibious and jungle warfare. In January 1944, the regiment, along with the rest of the division moved to Goodenough Island to prepare for the Hollandia landings.

On 22 April, the regiment conducted an amphibious landing at Tanahmerah Bay in conjunction with the 19th Infantry Regiment. During the Battle of Hollandia, the regiment was able to advance quickly despite terrain conditions to overrun the airfields at Hollandia, which were defended by Japanese service troops. Four days later, the 21st Infantry linked up with the 41st Infantry Division, completing the pincer movement and trapping the remaining Japanese troops. The regiment remained to defend Hollandia until fall 1944.

For the recapture of Leyte, the regiment became a separate regimental combat team (RCT). It was given the task of securing the Panaon Straits, located at the southern tip of Leyte. Capture of the straits would enable Naval forces to move to the western side of the island. The regiment captured the northern coast of Panaon Island and the southern shore of Leyte without meeting resistance, an hour before the main landings farther to the north. The 24th Division met heavy Japanese resistance during its landings, and the 21st was returned to control of the division on 30 October. On 5 November, the regiment replaced the 34th Infantry Regiment at Breakneck Ridge, west of Pinamopoan on Leyte's northern shores. Japanese troops in the area were dug in and offered fierce resistance to the regiment's advance. On 8 November, the regiment attacked the ridge but the attack was hampered by a typhoon. After four days of heavy fighting and casualties, the regiment secured Breakneck Ridge. The capture of the ridge ended the last significant Japanese resistance on Leyte.

On 30 December 1944, the regiment was attached to the Western Visayas Task Force for the capture of Mindoro. During the next month, the regiment cleared the island of Japanese troops. In this phase of the battle, the regiment suffered casualties of one killed and seven wounded while killing dozens of Japanese troops. Meanwhile, K Company captured Marinduque on 3 January 1945. The island was previously cleared of most Japanese troops by Filipino soldiers and recognized guerrillas. The regiment's cannon company supported the 11th Airborne Division during its drive on Manila in the Battle of Luzon. For its fire support of the division, Cannon Company was awarded a Presidential Unit Citation for actions between 31 January and 5 February.

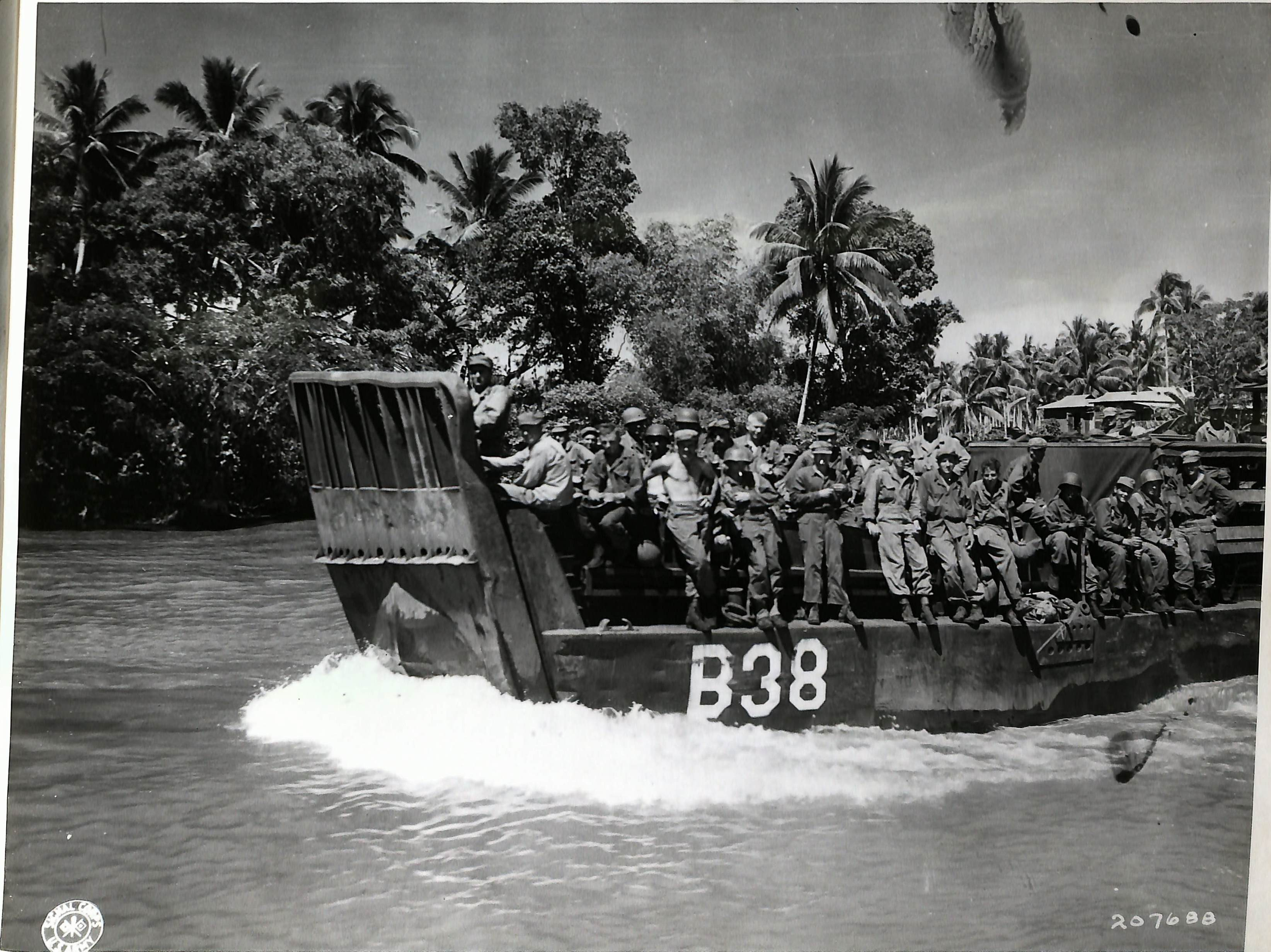
LCM carrying troops up the Mindanao River

The regiment fought in the Battle of Mindanao. On 17 April, it conducted an amphibious assault on Mindanao's south-central coast. The 3rd Battalion landed at Malabang and linked up with Filipino soldiers under the Philippine Commonwealth Army, Philippine Constabulary and recognized guerrillas there who had captured the Malabang Airfield. The remainder of the regiment landed at Baras, thirty miles southeast. The regiment embarked on landing craft of the 533d Engineer Boat and Shore Regiment and was transported to Kabacan using the Mindanao River. There, it became X Corps reserve. The arrival of the 162nd RCT allowed the 21st to return to divisional control.

On 30 April, the regiment attacked to clear the Libby Airdrome, Route 1-D and Mintal. A battalion of the regiment reached Mintal from the southwest on 3 May. The remainder of the regiment, reinforced by a battalion from the 34th Infantry Regiment, had cleared the airdrome by 5 May. However, the troops were unable to advance along Route 1-D toward Mintal. A battalion of the regiment crossed the Talomo River near Mintal on 8 May but had to withdraw two days later due to Japanese resistance. Two battalions of the regiment attacked again along the east bank of the Taloma on 12 May. By 14 May, the regiment had cleared Japanese positions enough that the regiment could secure Route 1-D to Mintal. During the battle for Mintal, PFC James H. Diamond earned the Medal of Honor posthumously. During a Japanese attack, Diamond was mortally wounded while he fired a machine gun, holding off Japanese troops from a patrol evacuating wounded from the 1st Battalion. The regiment attacked north from Mintal along Route 1-D and another road on 17 May. The 21st captured Tugbok on 21 May against fierce Japanese resistance. The regiment's right flank advanced to a road junction east of Tugbok by 27 May. The regiment was relieved by the 34th Infantry Regiment on 29 May. During the past two weeks, the regiment had inflicted heavy casualties on a battalion of the Japanese 100th Division.

On 31 May, the regiment attacked north from Lamogan on the left flank of the 24th Division. It captured Wangan on 9 June. The regiment then advanced on Calinan and was withdrawn from combat on 19 June. During its campaign in Mindanao, the regiment inflicted at least 2,000 casualties on Japanese troops. On 12 July, a battalion combat team of the 21st landed on the northwest shore of Sarangani Bay, where Japanese troops still held out. Along with other American & Filipino military units and recognized guerrillas, the battalion combat team cleared the Japanese from the area. The battalion combat team returned to Davao City on 11 August. The Japanese troops at Sarangani Bay were the last significant Japanese unit in the Philippines that had not yet been attacked.

=== Cold War ===
In October 1945, the regiment, along with the rest of the 24th Division, arrived in Japan for occupation duties. It was stationed at Camp Wood near Kumamoto on Kyushu. Due to the postwar demobilization, the regiment was left with two understrength battalions. It also suffered from shortages of crew-served weapons, radios, field gear and boots.

==== Korean War ====
On 24 June 1950, the North Korean People's Army (KPA) invaded South Korea, beginning the Korean War. On 30 June, President Harry Truman decided to defend South Korea with American ground forces. The Pentagon selected the 24th Division to deploy first, with the 21st regiment being the first to go to South Korea. Due to a shortage of air transport, the regiment could only airlift a force comprising less than a battalion to Pusan. The remainder of the regiment and the rest of the division were to follow by sea transport. 1st Battalion, led by Lieutenant Colonel Charles Smith, became the advance force. It was designated as Task Force Smith and comprised B & C Companies, half of Headquarters Company, two 75mm M20 recoilless rifles, four M2 4.2 inch mortars and a battery of 105 mm howitzers.

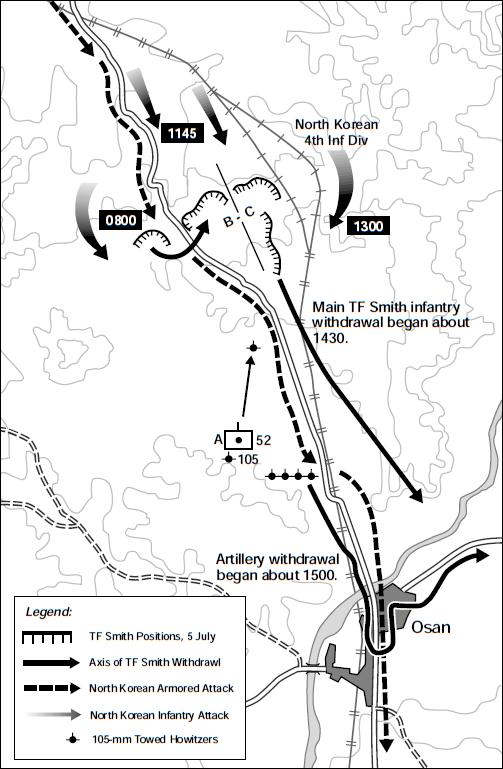
Map of Battle of Osan.

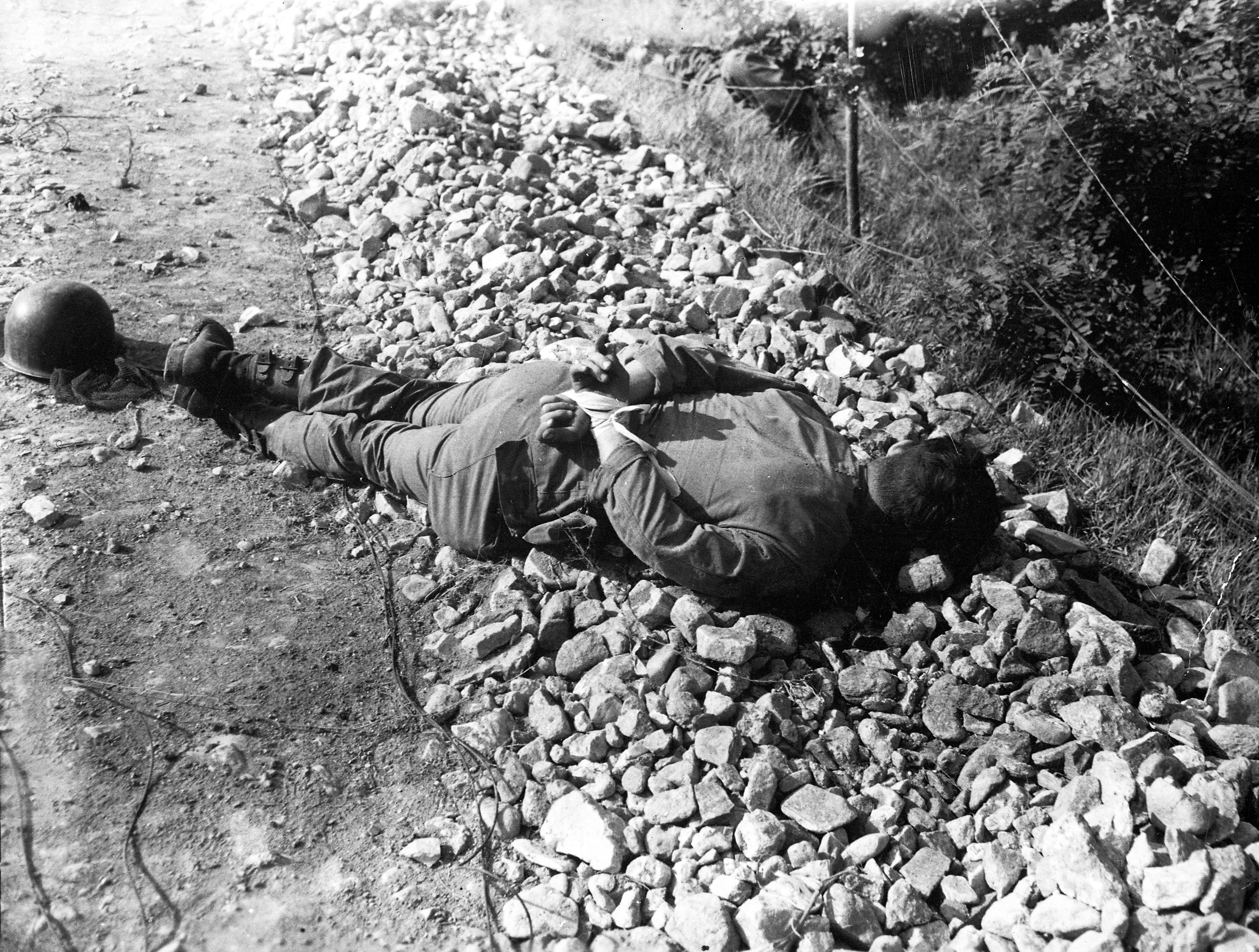
10 July 1950 A U.S. Army POW of the 21st Infantry Regiment bound and killed by North Koreans during the Korean War.

Task Force Smith airlifted into Pusan and then travelled by rail and truck to a position north of Osan, 45 kilometers south of Seoul. Task Force Smith dug in and prepared to engage KPA forces on 4 July. At 08:16 on 5 July, the task force opened fire on a column of 33 KPA T-34/85 tanks, supported by two regiments of infantry. Due to the lack of anti-tank weapons, the task force could only destroy four T-34/85s as the tank column continued south. KPA infantry then attacked Task Force Smith both frontally and around its flanks. Task Force Smith was able to hold off the KPA infantry for six hours, but was forced to withdraw, suffering heavy casualties. During the Battle of Osan, Task Force Smith suffered casualties of 60 killed, 21 wounded and 80 captured, out of a total strength of 540.

The remainder of the 21st Infantry arrived at Chochiwon by 7 July. Chochiwon was located along one of two roads to the Kum River and Taejon. The remnants of Task Force Smith joined the regiment by 8 July. 1st and 3rd Battalions repelled the North Korean advance until 12 July. During the Battle of Chochiwon, the 21st Regiment suffered 531 killed, wounded or missing. On 30 August, the 34th Infantry's 3rd Battalion became the 21st's 2nd Battalion. The regiment fought on the Naktong River line until 19 September. The 24th Division, including the 21st, was awarded a Presidential Unit Citation for its actions between 2 July and 15 September.

After the Inchon landings on 15 September, the KPA forces besieging the Pusan Perimeter began to retreat. The 21st Regiment broke out of the perimeter on 19 September. In a rapid advance northward, it took Waegwan, Kumchon and Taejon. The regiment crossed the 38th parallel north in mid-October. At the peak of its advance on 2 November, the regiment was 17 miles (27 km) south of the Chinese border.

On 3 November, the Chinese People's Volunteer Army (PVA) entered the war. PVA attacks forced UN forces to retreat across the Han River by 3 January 1951. The 21st Regiment fought in the First United Nations Counteroffensive. The regiment then fought in the defense against the Chinese Spring Offensive. C Company Sergeant First Class Ray E. Duke was posthumously awarded the Medal of Honor for actions near Mugok on 26 April. On 27 May, the regiment's headquarters and medical companies earned the regiment another Presidential Unit Citation for their defense against PVA attempts to overrun the regimental command post and aid station at Sanghongjong-ni. The UN renewed the attack in the UN May–June 1951 counteroffensive. During fighting between 14 and 15 November, G Company captured two heavily defended hills against PVA resistance, earning it a Presidential Unit Citation. K Company Private First Class Mack A. Jordan was posthumously awarded the Medal of Honor for his actions near Kumsong on 15 November. These battles resulted in a stalemate between UN forces and the PVA/KPA around the 38th Parallel.

In January 1952, the 24th Division, including the 21st Regiment, was removed from the line and sent to Japan. It became part of the US strategic reserve in the Far East. On 25 July 1953, the regiment returned to South Korea, where it guarded the Geoje POW Camp. The Korean Armistice Agreement was signed on 27 July, and the regiment oversaw POW exchanges at the camp. After the end of Operation Big Switch, the regiment was moved into reserve positions behind the Demilitarized Zone.

==== Post-Korean War service ====
In March 1955, the regiment was sent to forward positions on the DMZ to deter North Korean aggression. On 15 October 1957, the 24th was replaced in line by the 1st Cavalry Division. In 1958, elements of the regiment was sent with the 24th to replace the 11th Airborne Division in Germany. The US Army introduced the Combat Arms Regimental System, and the regiment was reorganized into battle groups. A Company became the regiment's 1st Battle Group at Warner Kaserne in Munich during July 1958. B Company became the regiment's 2nd Battle Group and was assigned to the 25th Infantry Division at Schofield Barracks during February 1957. C Company became the regiment's 3rd Battle Group and was assigned to the 63rd Infantry Division in May 1959. The 3rd Battle Group was inactivated on 1 April 1963. During the same year, the army was reorganized, dividing infantry divisions into brigades composed of three battalions. The 2nd Battle Group became the 2nd Battalion and was transferred to Warner Kaserne. On 15 April 1970, the 24th Division and the two 21st Infantry battalions were inactivated.

==== Vietnam War ====
The 3rd Battalion of the regiment was activated on 10 September 1965 at Fort Devens. It was subordinated to the 196th Light Infantry Brigade. On 26 August 1966, it was sent to South Vietnam. The brigade was attached to the 25th Infantry Division and was based at Tây Ninh. 3rd Battalion fought in Operation Attleboro between September and November 1966. In January 1967, the battalion participated in Operation Cedar Falls. Between February and April, it participated in Operation Junction City. The 196th was then transferred to Chu Lai. On 14 May 1969, medic Daniel J. Shea posthumously earned the Medal of Honor for rescuing wounded soldiers while mortally wounded. 3rd Battalion C Company medic James McCloughan received the Medal of Honor in 2017 for his actions near Tam Kỳ between 13 and 15 May. On 15 July, it was attached to the 23rd Infantry Division until that division's withdrawal from Vietnam in November 1971. The 3rd Battalion then formed Task Force Gimlet, patrolling the "rocket belt" around Da Nang. From 5 to 11 August 1972, Delta Company, 3/21st Infantry undertook the last patrol by U.S. troops in the war with two soldiers wounded by booby traps. The unit was relieved by South Vietnamese soldiers. The battalion was withdrawn from South Vietnam on 23 August 1972 and inactivated in Oakland on the same day.

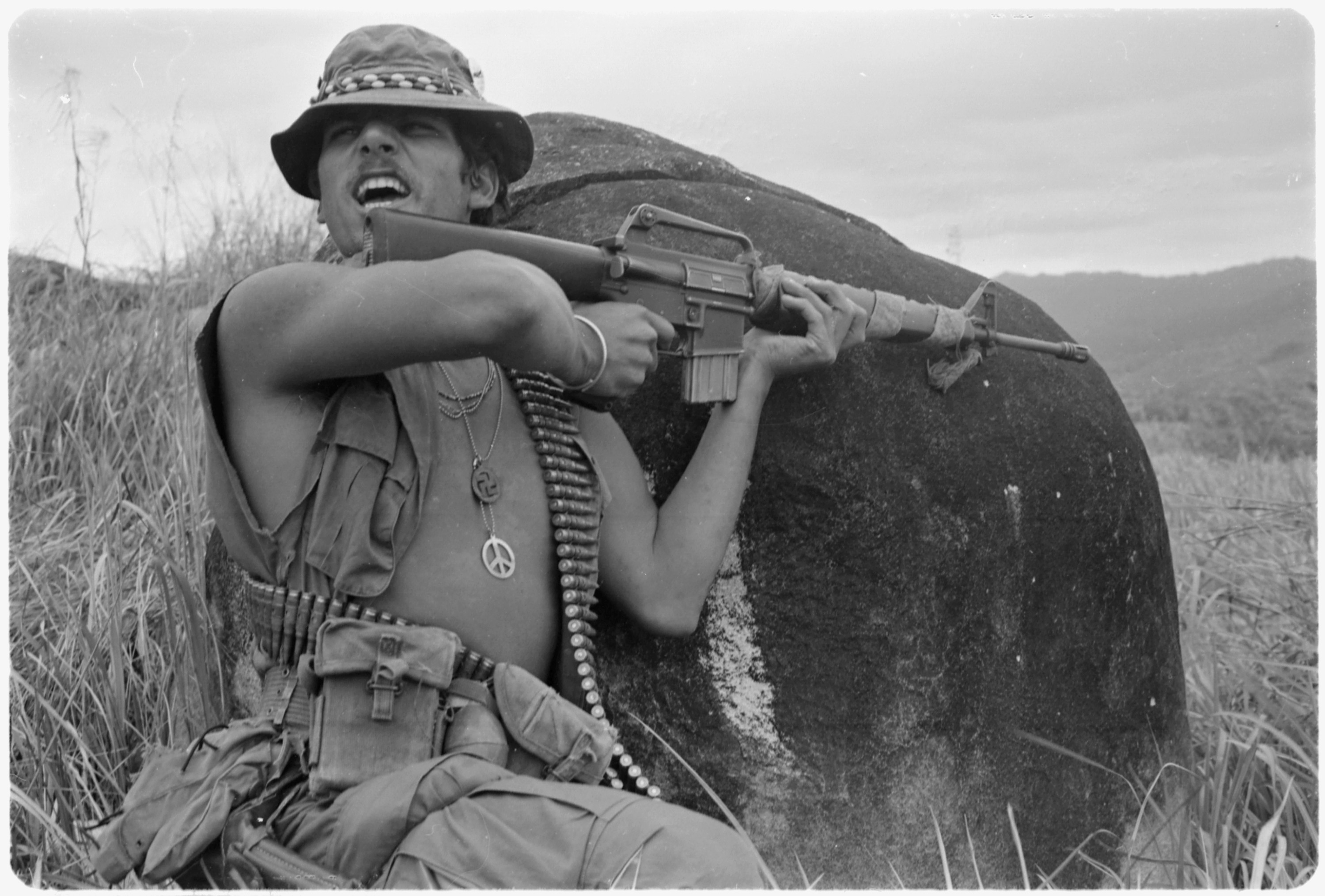
B Company/4th Battalion squad leader Specialist 4 Richard Champion shouting instructions to his squad after taking sniper fire on a patrol southeast of Chu Lai

The regiment's 4th and 5th Battalions were activated at Schofield Barracks on 6 December 1965 to serve with the 25th Infantry Division. However, both battalions were inactivated on 3 January 1966 because the division's deployment schedule would not have allowed the battalions to be prepared for combat. On 1 November 1967, the 4th Battalion was reactivated at Schofield Barracks to become the fourth battalion of the 11th Light Infantry Brigade, which was already serving in Vietnam. 4th Battalion deployed to Vietnam on 14 April 1968 and was based in Đức Phổ District. The battalion also operated west of Tam Kỳ and at Đông Hà. It was attached to the 23rd Infantry Division between 15 February 1969 and the battalion's withdrawal on 28 June 1971. On 26 August 1968, Staff Sergeant Nick Bacon of B Company took command after two platoon leaders were wounded. He led the two platoons against the Viet Cong forces, destroying a bunker and machine gun nest as well as personally killing four Viet Cong soldiers. Bacon then climbed onto a tank deck and gave fire support. For his actions, Bacon was awarded the Medal of Honor. On 28 June 1971, the 4th Battalion was withdrawn from Vietnam and inactivated on the same day at Fort Lewis.

=== Post-Vietnam service ===
On 5 June 1972, the 1st Battalion was reactivated and assigned to the 25th Infantry Division at Schofield Barracks. 2nd Battalion reactivated on 21 June 1975 and was sent to the 24th Infantry Division at Fort Stewart, but was inactivated on 15 December 1987. 3rd Battalion reactivated at Schofield Barracks with the 25th Division and inactivated on 15 July 1995. It reactivated with the 25th Division's 1st Brigade at Fort Lewis on 16 March 2002. 4th Battalion reactivated on 16 January 1986 with the 7th Infantry Division at Fort Ord. It was inactivated on 15 September 1993. 5th Battalion was reactivated on 16 May 1985 also at Fort Ord with the 7th and participated in Operation Just Cause from 1989 to 1990 as well as the 1992 Los Angeles riots in May of that year. It was inactivated on 15 September 1993.

Beginning in 2005 the 2nd Brigade including the 1st Battalion, 21st Infantry underwent reorganization as a Stryker brigade combat team. The brigade arrived in Iraq for a fifteen-month tour of duty in November 2007and was based at Camp Taji northwest of Baghdad. Serving with the Multi-National Division-Baghdad, the brigade was responsible for the rural areas northwest and west of Baghdad with the 1st Battalion operating near Abu Ghraib. The 1st Battalion, working closely with their Iraqi counterparts, was especially successful in eliminating terrorist cells and uncovering and destroying multiple weapons caches. The 1st Battalion returned to Schofield Barracks in February 2009.

In February 2016, soldiers of the regiment's first battalion participated in Exercise Lightning Forge with other units of the 25th Division's 2nd Stryker Brigade Combat Team.

Between 2019 and 2020, 3rd Battalion deployed with 1st Stryker Brigade Combat Team, 25th Infantry Division out of Fort Wainwright, Alaska in support of Operation Inherent Resolve.

On 8 June 2023, 3rd Battalion was inactivated at Fort Wainwright.

In April 2026 the unit was reactivated again at Fort Wainwright as 3rd Battalion 21st Infantry replacing 5-1 Cav.

== Lineage ==
- Constituted 3 May 1861 in the Regular Army as the 2nd Battalion, 12th Infantry
- Organized 20 May 1862 at Fort Hamilton, New York
- Reorganized and redesignated 7 December 1866 as the 21st Infantry
- Consolidated 9–31 August 1869 with the 32nd Infantry (see ANNEX) and consolidated unit designated as the 21st Infantry
- Assigned 29 July 1918 to the 16th Division
- Relieved 8 March 1919 from assignment to the 16th Division
- Assigned 22 October 1921 to the Hawaiian Division (later redesignated as the 24th Infantry and 25th Infantry Division)
- Relieved 5 June 1958 from assignment to the 24th Infantry Division and reorganized as a parent regiment under the Combat Arms Regimental System
- Withdrawn 16 January 1986 from the Combat Arms Regimental System and reorganized under the United States Army Regimental System

=== Annex ===
- Constituted 3 May 1861 in the Regular Army as the 3d Battalion, 14th Infantry
- Organized 27 July 1865 at Fort Trumbull, Connecticut
- Reorganized and redesignated 21 September 1866 as the 32d Infantry
- Consolidated 9–31 August 1869 with the 21st Infantry and consolidated unit designated as the 21st Infantry

== Campaign participation credit ==
- Civil War: Peninsula; Manassas; Antietam; Fredericksburg; Chancellorsville; Gettysburg; Wilderness; Spotsylvania; Cold Harbor; Petersburg; Virginia 1862; Virginia 1863
- Indian Wars: Modocs; Nez Perces; Bannocks; Arizona 1866; Arizona 1867; Arizona 1868; Arizona 1869; Arizona 1870
- War with Spain: Santiago
- Philippine–American War: Zapote River; Luzon 1899; Luzon 1901; Luzon 1902
- World War II: Central Pacific; New Guinea (with arrowhead); Leyte; Luzon; Southern Philippines (with arrowhead)
- Korean War: UN Defensive; UN Offensive; CCF Intervention; First UN Counteroffensive; CCF Spring Offensive; UN Summer-Fall Offensive; Second Korean Winter; Korea, Summer 1953
- Vietnam: Counteroffensive, Phase II; Counteroffensive, Phase III; Tet Counteroffensive; Counteroffensive, Phase IV; Counteroffensive, Phase V; Counteroffensive, Phase VI; Tet 69/Counteroffensive; Summer-Fall 1969; Winter-Spring 1970; Sanctuary Counteroffensive; Counteroffensive, Phase VII; Consolidation I; Consolidation II; Cease-Fire
- Armed Forces Expeditions: Panama
- Operation Uphold Democracy, Port-au-Prince, Haiti, 1995
- Operation Iraqi Freedom, Operation Inherent Resolve and Enduring Freedom (Afghanistan), Global War on Terrorism

== Decorations ==
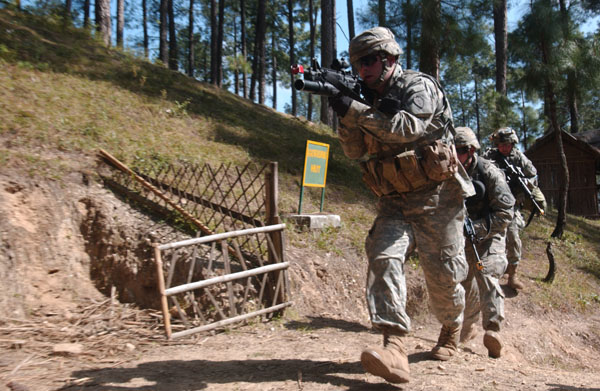
An assault team from C Company, 3rd Battalion, 21st Infantry Regiment clears an objective during a demonstration for Battalion, 5th Group, 5th Gurkha Rifles (Frontier Force) during Exercise Yudh Abhyas

- Valorous Unit Award for OIF 3 August–October 2004 – 2005
- Presidential Unit Citation (Army) for OIF II
- Presidential Unit Citation (Army) for DEFENSE OF KOREA
- Presidential Unit Citation (Army) for SANGHONGJONG-NI
- Valorous Unit Award for TAM KY - TIEN PHUOC
- Navy Unit Commendation for CAM LO
- Philippine Presidential Unit Citation for 17 OCTOBER 1944 TO 4 JULY 1945
- Republic of Korea Presidential Unit Citation for PYONGTAEK
- Republic of Korea Presidential Unit Citation for KOREA

== See also ==
- Battle of Osan
