= Shane Higashi =

Canadian karateka

- Born: Shane Yukio Higashi; October 14, 1940 (age 86); Chemainus, British Columbia, Canada
- Style: Chito-ryu, Karate, Ryukyu Kobudo
- Teachers: Masami Tsuruoka, Tsuyoshi Chitose
- Rank: 10th dan (九段).

Shane Yukio Higashi (born October 14, 1940) is a Canadian born karate instructor and practitioner. He is the current head of The Canadian Chitō-ryū Karate-dō Association, and the Technical Advisor for Karate Canada. Shane Higashi was inducted into the Canadian Black Belt Hall of Fame in 2007.

== Life and career ==
Higashi was born in Chemainus, British Columbia. His family moved to Japan in 1946 and then later returned to Canada in 1956. In 1961, he began studying Karate at 21 years of age under the instruction of Masami Tsuruoka. He became his star pupil, earning his shodan in only one year. In 1964, he became the Grand Champion of the 1st Canadian Open Karate Tournament.

On April 1, 1963, he opened the Higashi School of Karate on Danforth Avenue in Toronto, Ontario, Canada.

In 1965, Higashi received his 2nd Dan from Tsuyoshi Chitose, and then moved back to Japan in January 1966 to continue his training under Chitose. He studied and trained intensively in Japan for seven months, attaining his 4th Dan and a special instructor certificate, issued to only a select few. In 1968 he received his 5th Dan from Chitose, and then, in 1972, he received his 6th Dan.

In 1975 he was designated as the leading authority in Canada for Kobujutsu of the Ryukyu Kobujutsu Hozon Shin Ko Kai by its founder Motokatsu Inoue. Higashi was involved in the formulation of the Canadian Ryukyu Kobujutsu Association in 1995, and currently sits as the National Chief Instructor

In 1979, he received his 7th Dan, and was awarded Kyoshi-go. He was also designated as the leading authority in Canada for Chito Ryu Karate by its founder, Tsuyoshi Chitose. In 1997, Higashi received his 8th Dan from Chitose Soke (the son of the founder and now the head of Chito Ryu). In November 2008, Higashi was awarded his 9th Dan and the title of Hanshi, by Masami Tsuruoka.
