= Count Dante =

American martial artist (1939–1975)

- Born: John Timothy Keehan; February 2, 1939; Beverly, Chicago Illinois, U.S.
- Died: May 25, 1975 (aged 36)
- Style: Karate
- Teacher: Robert Trias

Count Juan Raphael Dante (born John Timothy Keehan; February 2, 1939 – May 25, 1975) was an American martial artist figure during the 1960s and 1970s who claimed he could do extraordinary feats such as Dim Mak.

== Early career ==
Keehan was born in Beverly, Chicago, on February 2, 1939, to a well-to-do Irish American family. His father, Jack, was a physician and director of the Ashland State Bank, and his mother, Dorothy, occasionally appeared on the society pages of the Chicago Tribune. Keehan attended Mount Carmel High School and boxed at Johnny Coulon's 63rd Street gym, and after graduating from high school he joined the Marine Reserves and later the Army, where he learned hand-to-hand combat and jujitsu techniques. He trained under various martial arts masters during the infancy of Western interest in Asian martial arts during the 1950s. One of the early masters he trained under was sensei Robert Trias. After gaining his black belt in karate, Keehan went on to become a sensei himself.

Keehan was the Midwest director of the United States Karate Association (USKA) until 1962. He left that organization in 1964 to form a so-called World Karate Federation. In 1990, a new World Karate Federation unassociated with Keehan's was formed.

In Chicago, Keehan co-promoted America's first full-contact style martial arts tournament at the University of Chicago on July 28, 1963, and hosted many other such tournaments during the 1960s, pairing practitioners of different styles against each other.

== Dan-te ==
Keehan grew disillusioned with conventional karate instruction's focus on ceremony, tradition and protocol over what he felt to be "effectiveness" and began developing his own style that he would promote as "street-effective". Through these efforts, he developed a system that became known as the Dan-te system, "Dance of Death" or sometimes the Kata-Dante. Theoretically, by learning all of the steps of Keehan's "Dance of Death", you would thereby become an effective fighting master.

== "The Deadliest Man Alive" ==
In 1967, Keehan legally changed his name to Count Juan Raphael Danté, explaining the name change by stating that his parents fled Spain during the Spanish Civil War, changed their names, and obscured their noble heritage in order to effectively hide in America from Spaniard anti-royalist communists. (Edmond Dantès is the protagonist of Dumas' 1844 The Count of Monte Cristo.) Keehan was prone to boasts that furthered his reputation, his most notorious one being that he'd participated in secret "death matches" in Thailand and China, winning by killing opponents in front of crowds numbering in the thousands.

He began heavily promoting himself via comic book ads as the Deadliest Man Alive. One had only to mail order his instructional booklet World's Deadliest Fighting Secrets (in which he outlined the "Dance of Death") to also receive a free Black Dragon Fighting Society membership card. These comic book ads account for much of Count Dante's lasting notoriety in pop culture. They read

Yes, this is the DEADLIEST and most TERRIFYING fighting art known to man—and WITHOUT EQUAL. Its MAIMING, MUTILATING, DISFIGURING, PARALYZING and CRIPPLING techniques are known by only a few people in the world. An expert at DIM MAK could easily kill many Judo, Karate, Kung Fu, Aikido, and Gung Fu experts at one time with only finger-tip pressure using his murderous POISON HAND WEAPONS. Instructing you step by step thru each move in this manual is none other than COUNT DANTE — THE DEADLIEST MAN WHO EVER LIVED.

The Black Dragon Fighting Society founded by Count Dante is an American martial arts organization and has no connection with and should not be confused with the Japanese Black Dragon Society, an ultranationalist secret society during the 1930s and 1940s.

== The Dojo Wars ==
The various enmities culminated in the Dojo War incident of April 24, 1970, where Dante and some of his students performed a dojo storm on Green Dragon Society's Black Cobra Hall. According to press coverage, upon entering the school, they claimed to be police officers and attacked the rival dojo's students. The brief battle resulted in the death of one of Dante's friends and fellow sensei, Jim Koncevic.

Former mob lawyer Robert Cooley states in his autobiography When Corruption was King that he represented Count Dante during the trial following the 1970 Dojo War incident. Cooley recalls that Dante was ultimately acquitted but not before both sides were given a stern lecture by the judge citing everyone at fault. Cooley also suggests that Dante was a mastermind in the notorious 1974 Chicago Purolator vault robbery in which the amount of $4.3 million was stolen. While not one of the suspects in the trial, Dante was allegedly questioned by Illinois grand jury and ultimately passed a lie detector test. Dante died shortly before the trial was completed which resulted in the conviction of all but one person involved.

== Death ==
Count Dante died in his sleep of internal hemorrhaging caused by a bleeding ulcer, on May 25, 1975.

== See also ==
- Modern schools of ninjutsu
