= Henry Slomanski =

American karateka (1928–2000)

Henry "Hammering Hank" Slomanski (June 18, 1928 – April 23, 2000) was a karate champion and later the International Commissioner of Karate in the United States. Slomanski began his karate training in Japan while a non-commissioned officer in the U.S. Army. The type of karate practiced by Slomanski was Chitō-ryū. After retiring from the Army, Slomanski became an ordained minister in the Eastern Orthodox Church of the East.

== Biography ==
Henry Slomanski was born in Evansville, New Jersey on June 18, 1928. He joined the U.S. Army at the age of 16 in 1944 as a minor, as many underage kids did at that time. In May 1945 he served in Italy during the final days of World War II in Europe. Stationed on the Italian-Yugoslav border immediately after the war, he shot and killed his first man, a red partisan trying to cross the border. He served in both the occupation forces in Germany and Japan. Over six feet two inches tall and possessed of superb physical fitness, Slomanski rose through the ranks to end his military career as a Command Sergeant Major, having served in airborne infantry, ranger (commando), and special forces units. As his gravestone at Arlington National Cemetery clearly indicates, Slomanski served in combat in World War II, the Korean War and the Vietnam War, retiring from the Army in 1966.

Slomanski was awarded three Purple Hearts, one Silver, and a Bronze for his exceptional leadership as well as injuries sustained while serving in Korean War.

While on military assignment in Japan, Slomanski began his training in karate under the guidance of Dr. Tsuyoshi Chitose, a karate master. An outstanding student, Slomanski went on to become the karate champion of Japan in 1953. In 1956, he was named the International Commissioner of Karate in the United States.

Among the notable students of Slomanski over the years, two of the most famous would be Elvis Presley and Dan Inosanto (Dan widely known as Bruce Lee's close friend and training partner).

Hank awarded Elvis his first black belt in 1960. And while Presley's legitimacy for his rank over the years had come into question in martial arts circles, many that trained with Hank have stated that if anyone (including Elvis) ever earned a black belt from Hank, you can bet it was earned. Hank tested Elvis hard and tried to break him but found out that Elvis had a true "fighter's spirit".

Dan Inosanto was already a well-rounded martial artist and tough man in his own right when he came to Hank Slomanski, but sought him out for supplemental training (this was before Dan met Bruce Lee) because he had heard of Hank's reputation from others as the guy to go to. Hank was among the toughest of the tough, who just happened to be a great martial artist. Dan has stated he learned quite a bit from Hank.

After his retirement from the military, Slomanski studied at the Maranatha Eastern Orthodox Bible Seminary and later became an ordained minister in the Eastern Orthodox Church of the East. Slomanski died in Richmond, Virginia in April 2000 at the age of 71.
