= Chintō =

Kata practised in karate

- Other names: Gankaku, Jin Do or Jin Tae
- Martial art: Karate
- Place of origin: Okinawa, Ryūkyū Kingdom
- Creator: Unknown, first known teacher: Chintō (Annan)

Chintō (鎮東) (In Shotokan, Gankaku (岩鶴)) is an advanced kata practiced in many styles of karate. According to legend, it is named after a stranded Chinese sailor (or pirate), sometimes referred to as Annan, whose ship crashed on the Okinawan coast. To survive, Chintō kept stealing from the crops of the local people. Matsumura Sōkon, a Karate master and chief bodyguard to the Ryūkyūan king, was sent to defeat Chintō. In the ensuing fight; however, Matsumura found himself equally matched by the stranger, and consequently sought to learn his techniques.

Its understood the kata Chintō was well known to the early Tomari-te and Shuri-te schools of karate. Matsumura Sōkon was an early practitioner of the Shuri-te style. When Gichin Funakoshi brought karate to Japan, he renamed Chintō (meaning approximately "fighter to the east") to Gankaku (meaning "crane on a rock"), possibly to avoid anti-Chinese sentiment of the time. He also included the use of high side kicks (yoko keri keage) instead of the original front kicks (mae- geri keage) and modified the actual pattern of movement, or embusen, to a more linear layout, similar to the other Shotokan kata. It is sometimes said that Chintō should be performed while facing eastwards due to its name, however, this could equally be a reference to its origins and the legend of Sōkon and Chintō.

The kata is very dynamic, employing a diverse number of stances (including the uncommon crane stance), unusual strikes of rapidly varying height, and a rare one-footed pivot. Today, Chintō is practiced in many karate styles like: Isshin-ryū, Wado-ryū, Shūkōkai, Isshin Kempo, Chitō-ryū, Shōrin-ryū, Shitō-ryū, Okinawa Kenpo, Shotokan, Koei-Kan, Gensei-ryū, Goshin Kagen Goju Matsubayashi-ryū, Bushikan-Ryu Karate, and Yōshūkai. Chinto is also practiced in Tang Soo Do Soo Bahk Do where it’s known as Jin Do or Jin Tae.
