= Michael G. Foster =

American martial artist (1940–2021)

- Born: April 19, 1940; Jamestown, New York, U.S.
- Died: February 11, 2021 (aged 80)
- Other names: Mike Foster
- Style: Yoshukai Karate
- Teachers: Yamamoto, Mamoru
- Rank: 10th dan karate

Other information
- Website: theyoshukaikarate.com

Michael G. Foster (19 April 1940 – 11 February 2021) was a U.S. karate pioneer and the founder and head of Yoshukai International, a world-wide organization of Yoshukai Karate schools. Yoshukai is a Japanese karate style adapted from Chito-ryu by Yoshukai founder Mamoru Yamamoto.

== Early days ==
Mike Foster was born in Jamestown, New York, an industrial and farming community in Western New York state in 1940. Foster developed into an athlete in high school and played football, among other sports. He joined the United States Air Force in 1956, seeking opportunities for advancement and travel. He completed basic training at Blackman, Texas, and in 1957 was stationed at Ituzuke Air Force Base near Fukuoka, Japan.

== Yoshukai history ==
At Ituzuke Air Force Base, Foster first studied judo, and later karate with Hiroko Watanabe Sensei, a Goju Ryu instructor who taught at the Itazuke Administration Annex base gym. Watanabe felt that Foster was a promising student and suggested that he study with Mamoru Yamamoto, later noted as founder of Yoshukai Karate but then still affiliated with Tsuyoshi Chitose's Chito-ryu. In 1964 Foster returned to Japan to test for second degree black belt and spent three weeks training at Yamamoto's dojo. He then returned to Japan in September 1964 to live and train in Yamamoto's dojo for approximately nineteen months.

Yoshukai insignia

Foster returned to the U.S. in 1966 as 4th degree black belt, and was named the Chief Representative of the U.S.A. Yoshukai Karate Association by Yamamoto. In this capacity, Foster established karate schools and headed schools in the USA which were part of the U.S. Chito-ryu Karate style. According to John Corcoran, Mike Foster and John Pachivas can be credited as responsible for establishing karate in the state of Florida.

In 1970 following Yamamoto's split from the Japanese Chito-kai Karate Federation, Foster left the U.S. Chito-kai, taking many schools under his direction with him and creating the Yoshukai Karate organization in 1971. Foster remained in the U.S. director position until 1980 when he left and founded his own Yoshukai International Karate Association. At this time Hiroyuki Koda assumed directorship of the U.S. Yoshukai Karate Association (USYKA), remaining under the umbrella of Mamoru Yamamoto. In 1989 after a lawsuit, Mike Foster was awarded the right to use the name "Yoshukai" openly and that others could not restrict him from using the brand name "Yoshukai."

Foster opened his first dojo in the U.S. in the mid-sixties at Tampa, Florida. Beginning in 1967, he established accredited Yoshukai Karate programs in Florida colleges and universities including St. Leo College, Florida State University, University of South Florida, University of Tampa and Florida Atlantic University. From Tampa he moved to Orlando, Florida, where he kept a dojo during the early seventies. During the late seventies and eighties Foster maintained a dojo in Daytona, Florida. In the early nineties he relocated to Titusville, Florida, where he shared a hombu dojo (headquarters) for seven years with Aikido Sensei Tom Walker. Foster continued to instruct senior grades at his hombu dojo in Titusville until 2008, when he retired from active teaching for health reasons.

== Career ==
Foster's association with Yamamoto, one of Chitose's top students and a tough fighter in Southern Japan, produced one of the top fighters in the US in the sixties. Foster's skills in kumite would succeed in Japan, as well, enabling him to win the Southern All Japan title. Although specific wins are unclear, Chito-ryu and Black Belt Magazine sources list him as a United States kumite champion from 1966 through 1970. In 1973 Mike Foster was the subject of a feature article in Black Belt Magazine.

During the course of his career, Mike Foster was:

- All-Service Karate Champion in Japan
- Southern All-Japan Champion in 1965
- Three-time USKA Grand National Champion
- U.S. International Karate black-belt division winner in 1970, withdrawing from the championship title bout
- Florida Karate State Champion, 1967 to 1975
- Duisburg Euro-Cup Karate Champion in 1978.

In addition, Foster was a founding member of Canadian National Karate Association, Commissioner of the Southeast Professional Karate Commission, a member of the Official Certification Committee of the AAU, Coach of the Amateur U.S. Team for World Championships in Europe and again in Long Beach, California. He was invited by the German Karate Union (HDU) and sponsored by West German Government to teach karate in West Germany.

Mike Foster holds an Instructor Degree from the Ministry of Education in Japan. As far back as the sixties, Foster's adaptation of the traditional Chito-ryu style for U.S. full-contact tournament fighting made the Yoshuaki style very advanced for its time. Due to Foster's success as a practitioner and instructor, Yoshukai International has established and maintains dojos all over the world, including the U.S., Canada, Puerto Rico, Germany, Latvia, Australia, New Zealand and South Africa.

== See also ==
- Yoshukai Karate
- Chito-ryu
- Okinawan kobudo
