= James H. Diamond =

United States Army Medal of Honor recipient

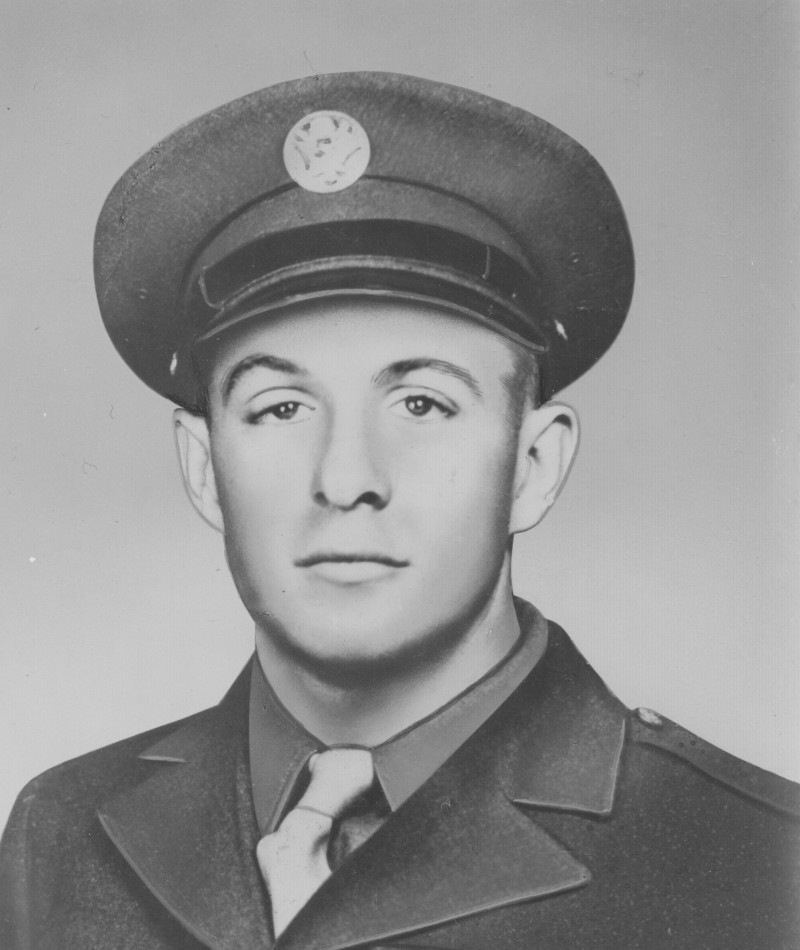
- Diamond c. 1943
- Born: April 22, 1925; New Orleans, Louisiana
- Died: May 14, 1945 (aged 20); Mintal, Mindanao, the Philippines
- Burial place: Evergreen Cemetery, Gulfport, Mississippi
- Military career
- Allegiance: United States of America
- Branch: United States Army
- Service years: 1943 - 1945
- Rank: Private First Class
- Units: 21st Infantry Regiment, 24th Infantry Division
- Conflicts: World War II
- Awards: Medal of Honor

James H. Diamond (April 22, 1925 – May 14, 1945) was a United States Army soldier and a recipient of the United States military's highest decoration—the Medal of Honor—for his actions in World War II.

== Biography ==
Diamond joined the Army from Gulfport, Mississippi in September 1943, and by May 8, 1945, was serving as a private first class in Company D, 21st Infantry Regiment, 24th Infantry Division. On that day and the following six days, at Mintal, Mindanao, the Philippines, he repeatedly distinguished himself by his actions in battle and by volunteering for hazardous assignments, such as evacuating wounded and repairing a bridge under heavy fire. On May 14, he was killed after running through intense hostile fire to reach an abandoned machine gun during a mission to evacuate wounded soldiers. For these actions, he was posthumously awarded the Medal of Honor ten months later, on March 6, 1946.

Diamond, aged 20 at his death, was buried in Evergreen Cemetery, Gulfport, Mississippi.

== Medal of Honor citation ==
Private First Class Diamond's official Medal of Honor citation reads:

As a member of the machinegun section, he displayed extreme gallantry and intrepidity above and beyond the call of duty . When a Japanese sniper rose from his foxhole to throw a grenade into their midst, this valiant soldier charged and killed the enemy with a burst from his submachine gun; then, by delivering sustained fire from his personal arm and simultaneously directing the fire of 105mm. and .50 caliber weapons upon the enemy pillboxes immobilizing this and another machinegun section, he enabled them to put their guns into action. When 2 infantry companies established a bridgehead, he voluntarily assisted in evacuating the wounded under heavy fire; and then, securing an abandoned vehicle, transported casualties to the rear through mortar and artillery fire so intense as to render the vehicle inoperative and despite the fact he was suffering from a painful wound. The following day he again volunteered, this time for the hazardous job of repairing a bridge under heavy enemy fire. On 14 May 1945, when leading a patrol to evacuate casualties from his battalion, which was cut off, he ran through a virtual hail of Japanese fire to secure an abandoned machine gun. Though mortally wounded as he reached the gun, he succeeded in drawing sufficient fire upon himself so that the remaining members of the patrol could reach safety. Pfc. Diamond's indomitable spirit, constant disregard of danger, and eagerness to assist his comrades, will ever remain a symbol of selflessness and heroic sacrifice to those for whom he gave his life.

== Awards and decorations ==
Pfc Diamond was awarded the following during his service

Badge	Combat Infantryman Badge		
1st row	Medal of Honor Bronze Star Medal		
2nd row	Purple Heart	Army Good Conduct Medal	American Campaign Medal
3rd row	Asiatic-Pacific Campaign Medal with arrowhead device and two campaign stars	World War II Victory Medal	Philippine Liberation Medal
Unit awards	Philippine Presidential Unit Citation		

== See also ==
- List of Medal of Honor recipients
- List of Medal of Honor recipients for World War II
