= Yoshukai Karate =

Japanese martial art

Yōshūkai Karate
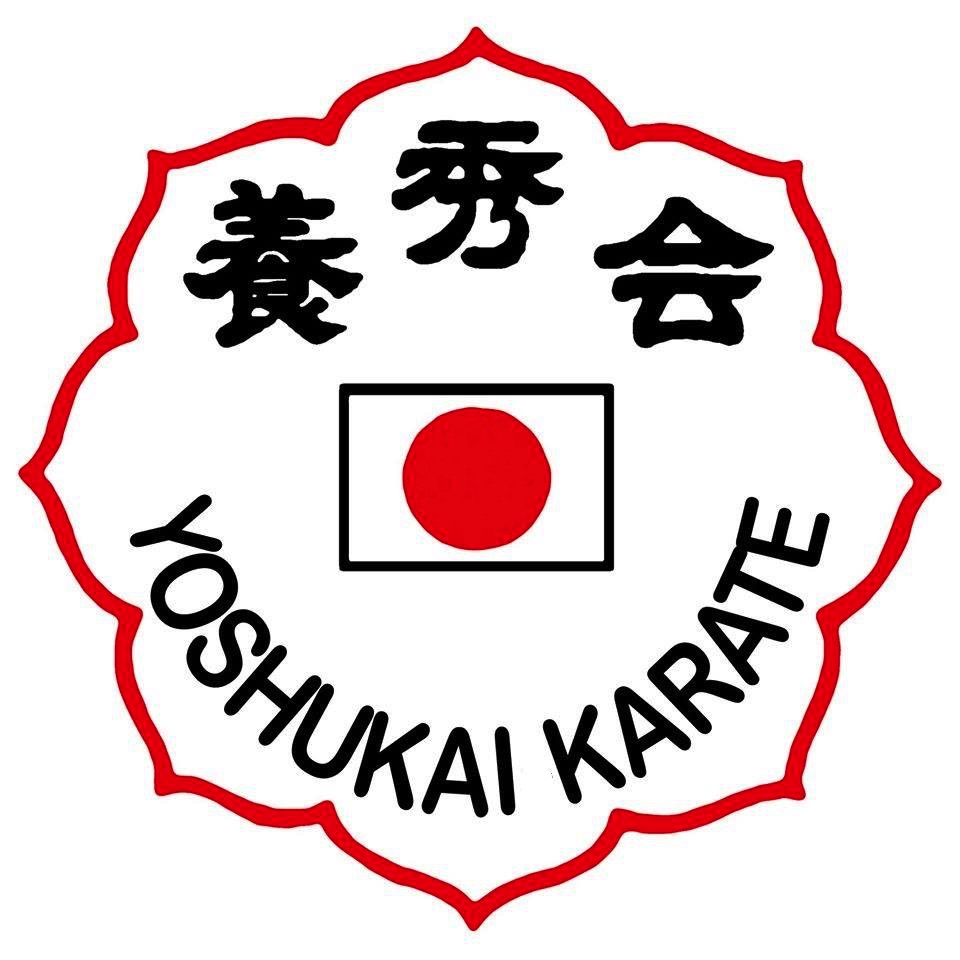
- Yoshukai Karate patch
- Also known as: Yoshukan
- Focus: Striking
- Hardness: Partial Contact. It is not allowed to strike someone's head or body below the groin such as in MMA or Boxing.
- Country of origin: Japan
- Creator: Mamoru Yamamoto
- Famous practitioners: Mamoru Yamamoto, Mike Foster, Hiroyuki Koda, Mike Sadler, Rayburn Nichols
- Parenthood: Chito-ryu
- Ancestor arts: Shorin-ryu, Shorei-ryu, Chinese martial arts, indigenous martial arts of the Ryūkyū Islands (Naha-te, Shuri-te, Tomari-te)
- Olympic sport: 2020 olympics karate was a sport.

Yoshukai (養秀会, Yōshūkai) is a Japanese style of Karate–dō. Karate-do. Karate-do translates as "Way of the Empty Hand." The three kanji (Japanese symbols) that make up the word Yoshukai literally translate as "Training Hall of Continued Improvement." However, the standardized English translation is "Striving for Excellence." Yoshukai Karate has been featured in Black Belt Magazine. Yoshukai karate is a separate Japanese style from Chito-ryu (which still retains its strong Okinawan roots). Kata, kobudo, kumite, and all karate aspects are drawn from the Founder, Mamoru Yamamoto. Yoshukai is a newer derivative Japanese style.

== Origins of Yoshukai Karate ==
The body of fighting and self-defense techniques which became Japanese Karate-do is thought to have originated about a thousand years ago in India and spread from there to China, Okinawa and finally to Japan in the early 1900s. Gichin Funakoshi (Funakoshi Gichin) and his son Gigo (Yoshitaka Funakoshi, 1906–1945), founded Shotokan karate. Shotokan is considered to be most responsible for the systemization and introduction of karate to Japan. Tsuyoshi Chitose was a school student of Funakoshi. Later when he travelled to Japan he assisted Funakoshi. Gichin Funakoshi asked Tsuysohi Chiitose to teach Masatoshi Nakayama (who became Chief Instructor of the Japanese Karate Association). Dr. Tsuyoshi Chitose, developed Chito-ryu karate from a combination of Shorin-ryu and Shorei-ryu karate styles. After moving from Okinawa to Japan in 1922, Chitose began teaching karate in Kumamoto, Japan. He refined the Okinawan techniques based on his medical knowledge as a medical doctor and officially founded his own style of karate in 1946, in 1952 naming it Chito-ryu, meaning "1,000 year-old style."

In the late fifties, Chitose's top ranking student and protégé was Mamoru Yamamoto (Yamamoto Mamoru). Mr. Yamamoto was given the dojo name of Yoshukan by Dr. Chitose. Bill Dometrich (2006; http://www.chito-ryu.com/index2.html) reports of difficulty between Dr. Chitose and Mr. Yamamoto with Yamamoto withdrawing (some say he was expelled). Mr. Yamamoto adapted new fighting techniques and traditional weapons from Okinawa from Chito-Ryu. After leaving the Chito-Kai Federation in 1971, Yamamoto became founding a new style of karate known as Yoshukai Bill Dometrich states the separation in his 2006 book (Karate, the Endless Quest; pp. 230–234). In addition, interviews with Mike Foster, Mike Sadler, and others confirmed these stories.

== Mamoru Yamamoto ==
Mamoru Yamamoto (later called Katsuo) (born 10 July 1938, d. 12 February 2017) began his formal training in the martial arts in Miyakonojo, Japan. He first studied judo, but began training in the Chito-ryu style of karate under Chitose at the age of fifteen. In 1959, Yamamoto and his wife Sumiko opened their first dojo in Kitakyushu, Japan in the Fujitani Judo Club. In the early 1960s, Chitose gave Yamamoto permission to start his own branch of Chito-Ryu karate under the name of Yoshukan, and in 1963 Chitose changed the third kanji of their branch's name from kan – meaning to stand alone – to kai – meaning association, indicating a potential for growth within the organization.

During this early period, Yamamoto worked with Mas Oyama of Kyokushinkai Karate to develop the rules for Japanese full contact sparring to replace the sun dome tournament rule of the time. This rule meant that competitors must spar at full speed but could not make contact with one another, which made judging of fighting very subjective. One competitor might move faster but the other could be more powerful, and it was up to the judge to determine which might win in the exchange of techniques. This development of new rules led to the modernization of tournament fighting in both Japan and the U.S.

Yamamoto was considered a tough fighter and top competitor in Japan and held the title of All-Japan Karate Open Tournament Champion from 1958 to 1960. In the early days of his dojo, he established his school through a practice called dojo yabe in which a martial artist visited neighboring schools and fought with its top practitioners. The winner established their school as stronger, and if a school was badly defeated, they often closed their doors and stopped teaching.

Yamamoto represented Japanese Karate at the Canadian International Exposition in 1967, and also demonstrated Yoshukai Karate at the World's Fair in Japan in 1970. Yamamoto and some of his students, including Mike Foster, accompanied Chitose on a promotional visit to Canada in 1967, where they conducted demonstrations, a clinic, and presided over the Canadian National Karate Association tournament. This trip was organized by Mas Tsuruoka, widely recognized as the father of Canadian Karate and, later, the founder of Tsuruoka Ryu.

In 1971 Mamoru Yamamoto withdrew from the Japanese Chito-kai Karate Federation. Bill Dometrich was sent to speak with Mr. Yamamoto because he "had elevated himself in authority and importance to the same level as Chitose Sensei. No one had ever done that before. Chitose Sensei had no Japanese students who would confront Yamamoto about his breach of etiquette, even on the telephone" (Dometrich, 2006; p. 230). Bill Dometrich met with Mr. Yamamoto and it was indicated that it was time for him to move on. In his departure, Yamamoto took with him the dojos established by his students in the United States.

== Mike Foster ==
Mike Foster (born 19 April 1940) was an American serviceman stationed in 1957 at Ituzuke Air Force Base, Japan. Foster first studied judo, and later karate with Hiroko Watanabe, a Goju Ryu instructor who taught at the Itazuke Administration Annex base gym. Watanabe felt that Foster was a promising student and suggested that he study with Mamoru Yamamoto who was then still affiliated with Tsuyoshi Chitose's Chito-ryu. In 1964 Foster returned to Japan to test for second degree black belt and spent three weeks training at Yamamoto's dojo. He then returned to Japan in September 1964 to live and train in Yamamoto's dojo for approximately nineteen months.

Foster returned to the U.S. in 1966 as 4th degree black belt and became recognized as one of the top fighters in the United States. He was named the director of the U.S.A. Yoshukai Karate Association by Yamamoto, and in this capacity established and headed karate schools in the United States which became part of the U.S. Chito-ryu Karate Federation. He returned to Japan on other occasions to study for a total of ten years under Yamamoto, during which time Yamamoto separated from the Chito-ryu Federation. Foster remained in the U.S. director position until 1980 when he stepped down and founded his own Yoshukai International Karate Association (YIK). In 1989 after a lawsuit, Mike Sadler was awarded the right to use the name; hence, Mike Foster could use "Yoshukai International Karate Association."

Foster opened his first dojo in the U.S. in the mid-sixties at Tampa, Florida, and shortly afterward established the first of several Yoshukai Karate schools associated with colleges and universities at St. Leo College, Florida. From Tampa he moved to Orlando, Florida, where he kept a dojo during the early seventies. During the late seventies and eighties Foster maintained a dojo in Daytona, Florida. In the early nineties he relocated to Titusville, Florida, where he shared a hombu dojo (headquarters) for seven years with aikido Tom Walker. Foster continued to instruct senior grades at his hombu dojo in Titusville until 2008, when he retired from active teaching for health reasons.

== Hiroyuki Koda ==
Hiroyuki Koda (Koda Hiroyuki) (1944–1997) arrived in the United States in the fall of 1969 from Fukuoka, Japan. Koda was an instructor what became Yoshukai, and was expected to assist with the establishment of Yoshukai schools in the U.S. He located in Florida to work within dojos established by Mike Foster, and in 1971 Koda and his American wife Gwen Lisk Koda opened their first dojo in Lincoln, Illinois.

Yoshukai became official 1973. Koda affiliated with the new U.S.A. Yoshukai style under Mamoru Yamamoto and Mike Foster continued to assist with establishing and developing schools in the United States. With the assistance of Yoshukai black belt Rayburn Nichols, he moved his family to Birmingham, Alabama, and named his organization Mid-South Yoshukai. In 1978 Hiroyuki Koda assumed the U.S.A. director position vacated by Mike Foster and renamed the Mid-South Yoshukai to the "U.S. Yoshukai Karate Association (USYKA)". In 1982, the Koda family moved to Texas, and in 1987 to Montgomery, Alabama, where Koda set up a honbu dojo (headquarters).

In 1997, Koda died from pancreatic and liver cancer, and his eldest son, David Yuki Koda, took over the directorship duties of the US Yoshukai Karate Association.

== Mike Sadler ==
Mike Sadler (1948–2020) spent his youth in Japan studying Shotokan karate and judo at the Kodokan. He met Yamamoto and later became third in rank and command of Katsuoh Yamammoto's U.S. Yoshukai organization (after Yamamoto and Koda). Sadler was responsible for establishing Yoshukai karate in Alabama and promoted hundreds of black belts during his decades with Yamamoto. He is the founder of Shingo-ha Yoshukai which focuses on stances, distances, angular movements, striking arts, joint taking, and throwing.

== Kumite ==
Yoshukai kumite or sparring style is classified as full contact. Both Mamoru Yamamoto and Mike Foster adapted the traditional Chito-ryu technique to meet the changing requirements of tournament competition, and in the sixties and seventies, this adaptation made the Yoshukai style very successful and advanced for its time.

Yoshukai uses mainly forward, side and natural stances and technique that emphasizes lack of regression in movement. Outside Japan, techniques and stances are adapted from Japanese karate to fit taller Westerners with longer legs and higher hara or center of gravity. Although Yoshukai is considered a full-contact style, students are also trained to participate in light- to medium-contact sparring within the dojo to develop strategy and control of technique.

== Kata ==
Traditional kata or forms from Chito-ryu (and occasionally other styles) are adapted to meet the philosophy and style of Yoshuaki Karate within the various organizations of the system. This list of kata includes traditional kanji script as best available:

Name	Kanji	Description
Nijushichi (Nijuhichiko)	二十七	27 Movements
Zenshin Kotai	前進後退	Advancing and Retreating
Heian Kihon 1–4 (H-Forms)	平安	Peaceful Mind, 1–4
Shihohai	四方拝	Four Quarters
Tai Ho Jitsu 1 – 5	-	
Seisan	正整 (十三)	Correct Arrangement (Thirteen Hands)
Niseishi	二十四歩	Twenty-four Hands
Rohai Sho	鷺牌 小	Vision of a Crane (minor)
Rohai Dai	鷺牌 大	Vision of a Crane (major)
Sochin	荘鎮	Tranquil Force
Tenshin	転身	Twisting Body Motion
Mugen (Yamamoto kata)	無限	Endless
Bassai	披塞	To Penetrate a Fortress
Chinto	鎮東	Subdue the East
Kusanku	公相君	Viewing the Sky/Night Fighting
Sanshiryu	三十六歩	Thirty-six Hands/Dragon
Ryusan	龍山	Dragon Spiraling Upward
Sanchin	三戰	Three Battles
Tensho	転掌	Rolling Palms
Tai Ho Jitsu 1 – 10	-	-
Hen Shi Ho Jitsu 1 – 50	-	-
Hanten	-	-
Rinten	-	-
Kakete	-	To advance against the opponent
Te Waza		Upper body throwing technique
Koshi Waza		Mid body throwing technique
Ashi Waza		Foot, lower body throwing technique
Ne Waza		Ground technique
Nage Waza	-	Throwing technique

== Kobudo ==
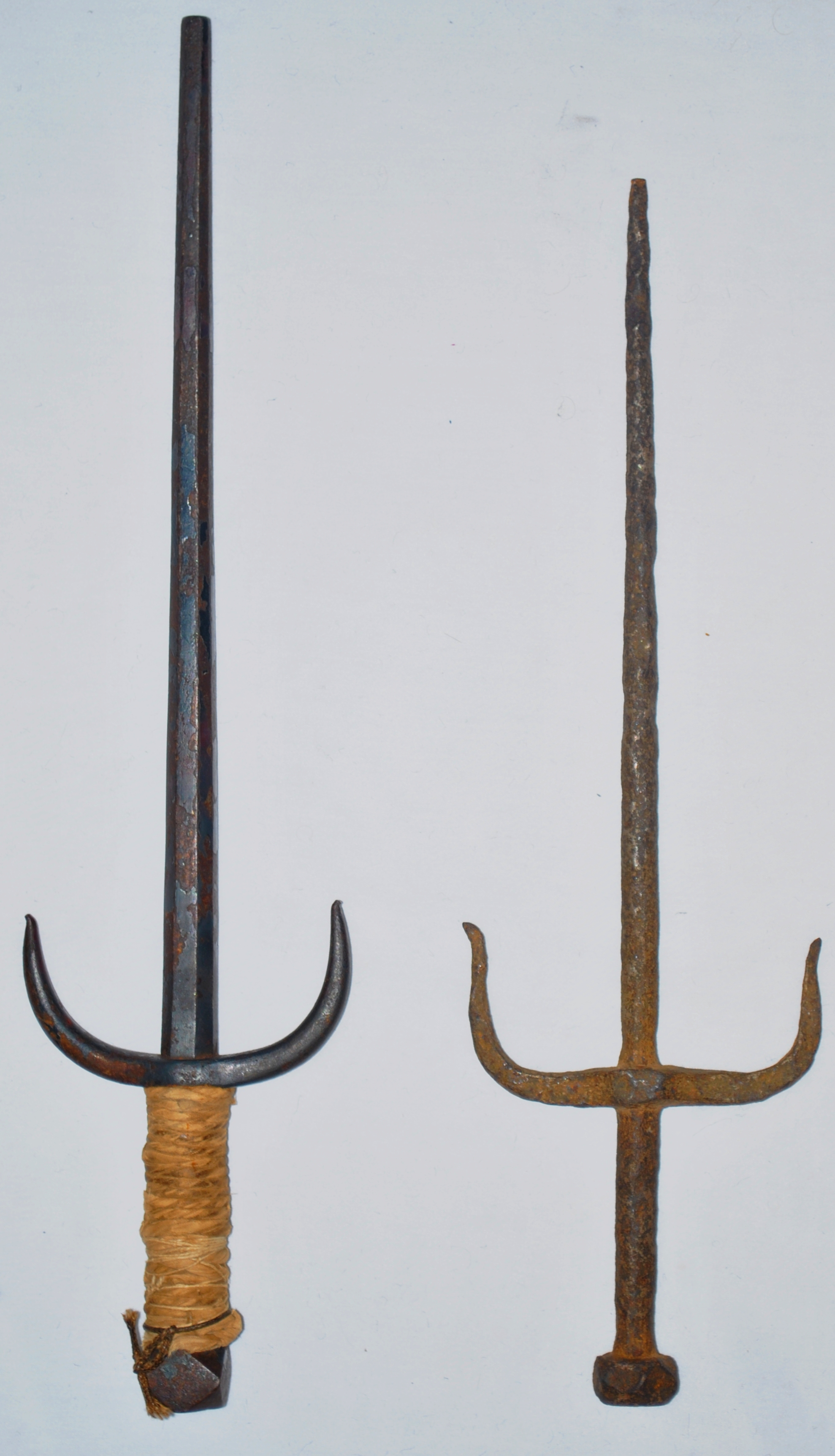
Two sai

Kobudo translates as "old martial arts ways" but has taken on the connotation of being a reference to weapons arts (bukijutsu). Yoshukai karate uses a number of Okinawan weapons which were originally farm tools converted into defensive implements. Yoshukai study includes traditional Okinawan kobudo as an extension of karate technique, and mastering the use of martial arts weapons may be required for advancing in rank. These weapons include the Nunchaku, Bō, Sai, Kama, Tonfa, Tessen, and sometimes the Katana or Samurai sword.

== Yoshukai Karate organizations ==
In the 21st century, the Yoshukai Karate style is represented by numerous local, regional and international organizations, some of which are listed below.

=== Yoshukai International ===
Yoshukai (養秀会) International was the karate organization founded by Michael G. Foster in 1977 and derived from Yoshukai karate. Yoshukai International is adapted for the different body type of U.S. and European practitioners. In Mike Foster's Yoshukai International, stances and techniques were modified to incorporate Foster's ideas about weapon alignment and elimination of regression. Mike Foster died in 2020.

Foster studied with Yamamoto in Japan for a period of ten years and in 1966 brought the system to the United States. In 1977 Mike Foster left Yamamoto's organization and established the Yoshukai International Karate Association. At the same time Hiroyuki Koda established the U.S. Yoshukai Karate Association (USYKA).

Foster was noted as a karate champion in the early days of his career, and after retirement from active competition, remained a premiere karate official and teacher in America. Other noted champions and officials associated with the style include Larry Pate (retired), Calvin Thomas, Mike Smith, Donnie Hair and Tracy Moorehead. Yoshukai International at one point had dojos all over the world, including the U.S., Canada, Puerto Rico, Germany, Latvia, Australia, New Zealand, and South Africa.

Depending on the source, the outline of the crest patch represents a cherry blossom or possibly Yata no Kagami (八咫鏡), the sacred mirror of Japan which stands for wisdom and honesty. The three kanji symbols that make up the word "Yoshukai" across the top of the crest (養秀会), literally translated, mean: Training Hall of Continued Improvement. The flag in the center of the crest is the Nisshōki (日章旗 "sun flag") or Hinomaru (日の丸 "sun disc") and the kanji symbol superimposed on it (忍) is "Nin" which stands for patience (a later addition to the patch).

Dojo Kun or rules are (numbers 2–6 were adopted from Shotokan):

1. To uphold the Dojo name
2. To seek perfection of character
3. To be faithful
4. To endeavor in all things
5. To respect others
6. To refrain from violent behavior

Most dojos within Yoshukai International used four belt colors without stripes to recognize the standard kyu (below black belt) and dan (above black belt) ranks, although some dojo use belts with stripes to indicate the specific ranks. Many years of disciplined study are required for belt advancement, and increase in rank is approved or denied based on specific stringent criteria judged by a panel of more highly ranked judges. Alexandria Plumer, an American studying under Gerry Blank in Los Angeles, is the youngest female in the world to achieve black belt status in Yoshukai Karate. Plumer achieved her first-degree black belt in 1997 at the age of 9-years-old. Grant Clements, now an Audio Engineer and Music Producer in Nashville, TN accomplished the same feat at 8-years old in 2004. Due to Mike Foster's success as a practitioner and instructor, Yoshukai International in its "zenith" established schools all over the world, including throughout the United States, Canada, Puerto Rico, Germany, Latvia, Australia, New Zealand, and South Africa.

==== Yoshukai Karate International ====
Yoshukai Karate International was formed on June 28, 2008, due to differences in management philosophy between Mike Foster and the Yoshukai International's separately incorporated testing board. The board continues to function as a not-for-profit corporation doing business as Yoshukai Karate International. The Yoshukai Karate International original board of directors consist of 11 former senior instructors from YIKA. These members include president and chairman of the board, Michael McClernan Hachi-dan, Vice-president Robert Bush Hachi-dan, secretary/treasurer Wiliam "Tiger" Moore Hachi-dan, Board Members: John Matthews Sichi-dan, Ricky Copeland Sichi-dan, Michael Myer Rokyu-dan, Dickie Cromwell Sichi-dan, Christina McClernan Sichi-dan, Lee Farrell Sichi-dan, and Michael Mendelson Rokyu-dan, Eddie Machen Rokyu-dan. Michael Myer later split and formed his own organization (American Yoshukai).

=== U.S. Yoshukai ===
U.S. Yoshukai Karate is one of two main branches that grew out of Yoshukai karate in the U.S. David Koda's U.S. Yoshukai Karate Association dojos are located in the southern part of the United States (Alabama, Kentucky, Georgia and Tennessee) with the headquarters located in Montgomery, Alabama.

In 1973, the Yoshukan branch of Chito-kai became Yoshukai Karate, an independent karate style. The Yoshukai Karate organization grew quickly as students reached black belt status and began opening schools throughout Alabama and surrounding states. Its growth was further accelerated when several instructors from other styles transferred their entire schools to the organization. In 1975 Koda assumed directorship of United States Yoshukai schools under Mamoru Yamamoto and renamed his organization U.S. Yoshukai Karate.

In 1997, after Koda died of pancreatic and liver cancer, his eldest son, David Yuki Koda, took over the directorship of the US Yoshukai Karate Association, though managerial duties remained with Gwen Koda until 2000, when she passed these duties to David Koda's wife, Adrienne Koda.

=== World Yoshukai Karate Kobudo Organization ===
At Katsuoh Yamamoto's request, Hiroaki Toyama and Mike Culbreth established the World Yoshukai Karate Kobudō Organization (WYKKO) in 2000 as an extension of the Japanese Yoshukai organization. Yoshukai America, which was renamed World Yoshukai, is directly managed under the headquarters of Yoshukai Japan and its offices are located in Pensacola, Florida, and Dothan, Alabama. World Yoshukai is the only U.S. organization directly administered by Yoshukai Japan. The organization is led by the director and Hiroaki Toyama (vice president of Yoshukai) and Mike Culbreth (vice president of Yoshukai). World Yoshukai now has more than 1,000 members in more than 30 branches throughout the United States, including Florida, Alabama, Texas, Georgia, California, Missouri, Nebraska and New Mexico.

=== Yoshukai Karate, Canada ===
In 1993 Sensei Mark Hepburn (shodan) and his wife Shelley (brown belt) opened a Chito Ryu dojo in Langley, British Columbia, Canada. From 1995 to 1996 Hepburn trained frequently with Sensei Nick Nibler, a 4th dan black belt with Mike Foster's Yoshukai International Karate group in Seattle, Washington. In 1996 Hepburn attended a clinic conducted in Seattle by Sensei Mike Foster (7th dan and founder of Yoshukai International Karate) and subsequently affiliated his dojo directly to Sensei Mike Foster. Also in 1996 Sensei Robertson of Toronto, Ontario joined Yoshukai International bringing with him several dojos in Ontario and Quebec. Sensei Robertson left Sensei Foster's Yoshukai International Karate in 2004 to form his own group, Yoshukan Karate. To date the highest ranked black belt for Mike Foster's Yoshukai International Karate in Canada and Canadian Head Instructor is Sensei Mark Hepburn, rokudan shihan (6th dan shihan). To this date (2016) Yoshukai Karate – Canada currently has two dojos, both in British Columbia; one in Surrey (main dojo) and the other one in the Township of Langley (Aldergrove dojo).

=== Yoshukan Karate Association ===
The Yoshukan Karate Association (YKA) was formed in 2004 in Mississauga, ON, Canada. The association was recognized by the National Karate Association (now Karate Canada) under the auspices of Sport Canada, an arm of the Government of Canada. The YKA is led by Kancho (director) Earl Robertson, 8th Dan, Hanshi grade, and supported by Kyoshi Louise Provencher (7th Dan), Renshi Robert Kalinowicz (6th Dan), Shihan Rebecca Khoury (4th Dan), Shihan Zeljko Violoni (4th Dan), Peter Bakomihalis (4th Dan), Elizabeth Gormley (4th Dan), Shihan Omer Gojak (4th Dan), Sean Donahue (4th Dan), Shihan Charles Mayer (4th Dan) and Matthaues Baurenberger (4th Dan).

The system is an amalgamation of two primary karate systems (Chito Ryu Karate & Yoshukai International Karate); and also offers the study of Japanese budo arts including Judo, Kobudo and Iaido. Robertson was the Honbu-Cho (chief instructor) for Yoshukai International Karate in Canada from 1996 to 2004 and holds senior ranks in Yoshukai International Karate (6th Dan-2004, Shihan-1998) under Kaicho Mike Foster and 7th Dan, Kyoshi under Kaicho Masaru Inomoto, a direct student of Tsuyoshi Chitose. Robertson also holds a 5th Dan from the National Karate Association under Hanshi Masami Tsuruoka and 4th Dan, Shidoin diploma directly from Tsuyoshi Chitose and a Godan (5th Degree Black Belt) in Ryu Kyu Kobudo Hozon Shinkokai under Hanshi Devorah Dometrich and ranks in Muso Shinden Ryu Iaido and Kodokan Judo.

The association operates various dojo across Ontario and Quebec and is a member in good standing with both Karate Ontario and Karate Canada. Kancho Robertson was formerly a vice president of the Karate Ontario Association and vice-chairman of the provincial technical committee. In 2019 Kancho Robertson was inducted into the Canadian Karate Association Black Belt Hall of Fame.

=== Yoshukai Germany ===
Mike Foster was invited by German karate pioneer Peter Trapski to conduct demonstrations in Germany in the late seventies and entered and won the Duisburg Euro-Cup competition in 1978. In the same year, Otto Rumann established the first German Yoshukai school in Dortmund, Germany, and later expanded to other cities. He now maintains his hombu dojo (headquarters) in Dortmund, and directs other schools in Hildesheim, Berlin, and in Hagen, Germany.

German Yoshukai schools fall under the leadership of Yoshukan Dortmund. Dojos are a members of Yoshukai-International Karate Association and also of the German Karate Federation.

=== Yoshukai Latin America ===
William "Bill" Solano was born in 1942 in Aguadilla, Puerto Rico, and was raised in the U.S. His first experience in the martial arts was in 1958 in New York City in the art of Jujutsu. In 1969 he began the study of Kung Fu in lower Manhattan, N.Y. In 1972 he moved to Daytona Beach, Florida, where he began studying Yoshukai Karate with Mike Foster. At the end of 1975, Solano returned to Puerto Rico and established his first dojo, where he continued to practice the Yoshukai Karate style until 1981. In 1991 full directorship of the Puerto Rico Yoshukai organization was assumed by Miguel Alejandro, with schools in Cupey, Carolina, Cidra, and two in Trujillo Alto. In 2009 Alejandro formally established Yoshukai Latin America.

=== Yoshukai Australasia ===
Tom Somerville, Neil Frazer and Warwick Lobb were instrumental in establishing Yoshukai Karate in New Zealand and later in Australia. Tom Somerville was a New Zealander who lived in the United States and trained with Mike Foster's students Charles Scanlan and Kevin Bradford in New Jersey in the mid seventies. He returned to New Zealand and in 1979 set up a dojo at the University of Canterbury. In the early 1980s, Neil Frazer and Warwick Lobb traveled from New Zealand to New Jersey to complete their black belt training, and Neil Frazer took over running the Canterbury club with assistance from Warwick. In 1990 Dave Leathwick started a club in Palmerston North known as the Tokomaru Dojo, and in 2004 Darel Hall started the third New Zealand club in Wellington.

Neil Frazer maintains a dojo in Sydney, Australia and continues to direct Yoshukai Australasia. The dispersed nature of New Zealander karateka means that New Zealand Yoshukai practitioners maintain their training in Malaysia, Canada, France and England. The organization operates a Facebook.com group to provide news and communications.

=== Yoshukai Latvia ===
The Neguss martial arts club was founded in Yurmala by Eric Annuskans and Sergej Lukatch in autumn 1995 with specialization in karate. Sergej Lukatch is a long-time student of Shihan Otto Rumann, who lived and trained in the Yoshukai Germany Honbu Dojo in Dortmund for several years before moving to Latvia in 1995. He is now the Head-Instructor for Yoshukai-Karate in the baltic region.

Initially the Neguss martial arts club worked as an affiliate of Riga's Budo Center, but in 1997 the club affiliated with Yoshukai, historically linking with Chito-ryu. On 3 April 1999, the club was accepted into the International Yoshukai Karate Association by Mike Foster. The Yoshukai-Karate branch of Latvia is part of the European Yoshukai group under the leadership of Shihan Otto Rumann. The Neguss club continues to represent Yoshukai Karate in Latvia.

=== Shingo-ha Yoshukai ===
Shingo-ha Yoshukai originated from Yoshukai Karate. Yoshukai Karate was founded by Katsuoh "Mamoru" Yamamoto in after he separated from Dr. Chitose Tsuyoshi, the founder of Chito-ryu. Yamamoto adopted many top students into his ranks to include Dr. Mike Sadler, Mike Foster, Rayburn Nichols, and Yuki Koda [34]. Over the course of time, these individuals (save for Yuki Koda) left Yamamoto to form their own organizations for various reasons. Dr. Mike Sadler (10th Dan, Meijin) formed Shingo-ha Yoshukai Karate-do. After Mike Sadler's passing in 2020, Shingo-ha Yoshukai leadership was appointed to Hanshi and Hachi-dan Scott Tomlinson and Hanshi and Hachi-dan Alexander Brice. Both were appointed Kaicho by Mike Sadler prior to his passing.

== See also ==
- Okinawan kobudo
