= Robert Trias =

American karate pioneer (1923–1989)

- Historical photo of Robert Trias
- Born: March 18, 1923; Tucson, AZ
- Died: July 11, 1989 (aged 66); Phoenix, AZ
- Style: Shuri-ryū Karate
- Teacher: Tung Gee Hsiang
- Rank: 10th dan (degree) black belt

Other information
- Notable students: Count Dante

Robert Aguirre Trias (March 18, 1923 – July 11, 1989) was an American karate pioneer, founding the first karate school in the mainland United States and becoming one of the first known American black belts. He also developed Shuri-ryū karate, an eclectic style with roots in internal Chinese kung-fu called Xing Yi Quan, and indirectly some Okinawan karate.

== Life before karate ==
The son of Mexican-Americans Jesus B. Trias (1895–1966) and Dolores Aguirre Trias (1896–1984), Robert Trias graduated from Nogales High School in Nogales, Arizona in 1941. He was employed by Southern Pacific Company as a boilermaker apprentice from 1937 to 1939 and as a boilermaker from 1939 to 1942.

== Introduction to karate ==
Robert Trias enlisted in the United States Naval Reserve in Phoenix, Arizona during World War II, on September 22, 1942. After completing recruit training, he attended Advanced Naval Training School Naval Station Treasure Island in San Francisco, CA, where he trained as a machinist. Trias was then temporarily attached to a patrol squadron at Section Base Morro Bay in San Luis Obispo County before returning to Treasure Island in September 1943.

By the summer of 1944, Trias was deployed to the South Pacific, where he participated in the Battle of Saipan. By September 1944, he was Machinist's Mate First Class Trias. On Tulagi, in the Solomon Islands, Trias tried his hand as a middleweight boxer. It is said that he met Tung Gee Hsiang, a Chinese missionary of Chan (Zen) Buddhism, while on Tulagi. Hsiang often watched Trias work out and imitated his boxing footwork, and he asked to practice with Trias. Trias refused because Hsiang was "just a tiny little guy," but Hsiang was persistent and at last Trias agreed to spar with him. Hsiang gave Trias "the biggest thrashing of his life" and Trias then asked Hsiang to instruct him in the martial arts. Trias returned home to the United States in November 1945.

== Karate in the U.S. ==
In late 1945, shortly before Trias left the Navy in January of the following year, he began teaching martial arts in his backyard. He later opened the first public karate school operated by a Caucasian in the United States mainland in Phoenix, Arizona, in 1946. Trias served as an officer of the Arizona State Highway Patrol from 1946 to 1961 utilizing his self-defense knowledge on duty and teaching his fellow officers. In 1948 he founded the United States Karate Association (USKA), the first karate organization on the American mainland. Jointly with John Keehan, Trias hosted the first national karate tournament in the United States, called the 1st World Karate Tournament, at the University of Chicago Fieldhouse in late July 1963 in Chicago, IL. This event was re-titled the USKA Nationals in 1966 and the USKA Grand Nationals in 1968. His rules for tournament competition are still used today with only slight variation.

During the development of his system, Trias utilized various names for his teachings, including Shuri Karate Kenpo, Goju-Shorei-Ryu, and Shorei-Goju Ryu, reflecting a synthesis of Okinawan, Japanese, and Chinese martial arts influences accumulated from the 1940s through the 1980s. While Trias identified the traditional Okinawan system of Motobu-Ryu as the foundational core of his curriculum, the style—formally designated as Okinawan Shuri-ryu in 1964 at the suggestion of Japanese masters Yasuhiro Konishi and Makoto Gima—incorporates distinct technical overtones from Chinese Xingyiquan (Hsing-Yi). Consequently, martial arts historians and critics have noted technical divergence between Okinawan Shuri-ryu and mainstream Okinawan lineages such as modern Goju-Ryu or historical Shorei-ryu. Following Trias's death in 1989, his curriculum and lineage continued to be propagated across the United States through several independent organizations, including the International Shuri-Ryu Association, the United States Karate Alliance, the United States Karate-Do Kai, the Professional Karate Commission, and Kondo No Shokai.

== Career accomplishments ==
Robert Trias was responsible for the following developments in karate in United States:

- 1955 - Wrote the first rules for karate competition
- 1955 - Conducted the first karate tournament
- 1958 - Wrote the first textbook
- 1959 - Made the first instructional film
- 1963 - Conducted the first world karate championships
- 1968 - Conducted the first professional karate tournament

== Published works ==
Trias authored: (Note: Other than the 1973 revised edition of The Hand Is My Sword: A Karate Handbook, all were self-published)

- The Hand Is My Sword: A Karate Handbook (1958; revised 1973)
- Karate Is My Life (1963)
- The Pinnacle of Karate (1980)
- The Supreme Way (1983)
- Render Yourself Empty (1984)

== Honors ==
Trias is a two time inductee to the Black Belt Magazine Hall of Fame. His first induction was a Black Belt Editor's Award, in the class of 1979. His second induction was an Honorary Award, in the class of 1989, the year of his death, posthumously honoring his legacy.

== Legacy ==
Trias formed the United States Karate Association in 1948, which continued after his passing until 1989. An arm of the USKA was the Trias International Society, which honored the outstanding competitors of the USKA. The Trias International Society froze all new inductions after Master Trias' passing. Trias International members carried on the tradition by forming extended halls of fame such as USKK Bushido International Society, USKA (alliance) Hall of Fame, Hawkes International Society, Bowles International Society, Rabino Shuri-Te Society, PKC Elite, and the International Warrior Society.

== Death ==
Trias died from a stint of reoccurring illnesses. Including a number of infections and stage 2 cancer complications exaggerated by an unspecified preexisting condition on July 11, 1989, leaving multiple branches of the Shuri-Ryu system. His daughter, Roberta Trias-Kelly, became the traditional inheritor of Shuri-Ryu. However, most of the highest ranks and Trias-appointed Chief Instructors followed Johnny Pachivas of Miami, Florida, who held Shuri-ryu style-headship for a period of 11 years until his death in February 2000. Pachivas was then followed by Robert Bowles who formed the International Shuri-Ryu Association.
