= United States Karate Association =

- Company type: Martial Arts Organization
- Industry: Karate
- Founded: 1948
- Founder: Robert Trias
- Headquarters: Phoenix, Arizona
- Area served: Worldwide
- Key people: Roberta Trias-Kelley, John Pachivas, George Anderson, David Jordan, James Hawkes, Cathy Davis, Joe Dupaquier, Buster Cotten
- Owner: Robert Trias
- Divisions: Organization of karate instructors, tournaments, demonstrations

The United States Karate Association) (USKA) was the first karate organization on the mainland United States, founded by Robert Trias in 1948.

The USKA became one of the largest associations of karate instructors in the nation, and through this organization Trias was also instrumental in setting up and promoting some of the first karate tournaments in the US in 1955, as well as national and worldwide competitions. The USKA rules for tournament competition are still used today in the United States with only slight variation.

At its height the USKA had more than a half-million members worldwide and, beginning in 1963, conducted an annual national championship competition in the United States. This competition was called the USKA National Championship in 1966 and became the USKA Grand National Championship in 1968.

Trias died in 1989 of cancer, leaving the Shuri-ryu system to his daughter Roberta Trias-Kelley and precipitating a struggle for succession within the USKA. Both John Pachivas, regional USKA director for the Southeastern US, and George E. Anderson (1931-2009), president of the United States Amateur Karate Federation, produced documents naming themselves as Trias' successor. After some confusion, David Jordan and James Hawkes, now deceased, founded a separate organization (United States Karate Alliance). As of 2024, the Alliance organization is managed by a board of several 6-8th Dan members. Cathy Davis, Joe Dupaquier and Buster Cotten are among the most active leaders.
