= Chitō-ryū =

Style of karate

Chitō-ryū Karate (千唐流空手)

- Tsuyoshi Chitose in Peggy's Cove, Nova Scotia
- Country of origin: Okinawa, Japan
- Creator: Dr. Tsuyoshi Chitose
- Parenthood: indigenous martial arts of the Ryūkyū Islands (Naha-te, Shuri-te, Tomari-te)

Chitō-ryū (千唐流) is a style of karate founded by Dr. Tsuyoshi Chitose (千歳 强直, Chitose Tsuyoshi), (1898-1984). The name of the style translates as: chi (千) - 1,000; tō (唐) - China; ryū (流) - style, school, "1,000 year old Chinese style." The character tō (唐) refers to the Tang dynasty of China. The style was officially founded in 1946.

Chitō-ryū is generally classified as a Japanese style because Chitose formulated and founded Chitō-ryū principally while living in Kumamoto, Japan. However, some modern practitioners feel it is better categorized as an Okinawan style given that its roots and techniques are firmly grounded in and derived from traditional Okinawan Tōde (唐手). This belief is warranted since the style's founder, Tsuyoshi Chitose, received first the rank of Judan, in 1958, and then the rank of Hanshi, in 1968, from the Zen Okinawa Karate Kobudo Rengo Kai (All Okinawa Union of Karate-do and Kobu-do).

== Founder ==
Tsuyoshi Chitose (千歳 剛直, Chitose Tsuyoshi) (Okinawan: Chinen Gua) was born on October 18, 1898, in the town of Kumochi, Naha City, Okinawa Prefecture. He came from a martial arts lineage—his maternal grandfather was Matsumura Sōkon (松村 宗棍). While in Okinawa, Chitose grew up studying the art of karate (唐手, Tang hand), now written 空手 (empty hand), as well as kobudō. In 1921, he moved to mainland Japan to study medicine. Chitose developed Chitō-ryū using his understanding of physiology to adjust traditional techniques to make them both more effective and less detrimental to the bodies of long-term practitioners. Chitose died in 1984 at the age of 86.

Chitose created Chitō-ryū by combining the strength techniques from Shuri-te (see also Shōrin-ryū and Shōrei-ryū), with those of Naha-te. The influence of Tomari-te is present but less than the other foundation styles.

=== Teachers ===
- Aragaki Seishō (新垣 世璋)

Chitose began his training in Tote, under Aragaki Seishō in 1905. He was seven years old and continued to train with Seisho until 1913/1914. While there is some discrepancy as to whether Chitose's first kata was Sanchin or Seisan, his book "Kenpō Karate-dō" states that he learned Sanchin from Aragaki for seven years before being taught another. Also attributed to his training with Aragaki Seishō are the kata Unshu, Seisan, Niseishi, and possibly Shihōhai. Aragaki was also a famous weapons master, leaving behind several bo and sai kata including Aragaki-no-kun, Aragaki-no-sai and Sesoku-no-kun. One of Aragaki's most famous students was Higaonna Kanryō, a major influence of the Gōju-ryū style who was also one of Chitose's primary teachers.

- Higaonna Kanryō (東恩納 寛量)
- Chōtoku Kyan (喜屋武 朝徳)
- Hanashiro Chomo (花城長茂)
- Choyu Motobu
- Sanda Chinen

== Signature aspects ==
Signature aspects of Chitō-ryū include:

1. an emphasis on shime (しめ)—a contraction of the muscles in the lower part of the body to generate additional strength and stability in stances,
2. the use of shibori (絞り, "to squeeze")—twisting contraction of the muscles in a specific area (often the arms) aimed at generating strength,
3. rapid rotational movements—particularly with the hips, and
4. at advanced levels, frequent use of movement off the line of attack—tai sabaki (体捌き).

== Kata ==
The kata of Chitō-ryū are very concise and they reflect the unique and diverse training experiences of the founder. Many Chitō-ryū kata bear the same name as other traditional Okinawan kata, but the kata itself is typically very different from the original or standard version. Some of these kata may have only one or two signature moves that relate it to the original, and in other cases the kata are completely different except in name. There are some exceptions to this; Chitō-ryū versions of Seisan, Bassai and Chintō are nearly identical to the original Shōrin-ryū forms as taught by Chōtoku Kyan. Overall, the higher-level kata of Chitō-ryū show a decisively strong Chinese influence compared to other Karate systems. Additionally, outside and above of the standard syllabus are kata such as Unsu and Hoen which are very fluid complex kata that are undoubtedly derived from a strong Chinese martial arts influence.

=== Shihōhai ===
Shihōhai (四方拝, "four-direction salute") is a kata peculiar to Chitō-ryū. There is some dispute as to the origin of this kata in the Chitō-ryū syllabus, some sources claim the kata comes from Chitose's first teacher, Aragaki Seishō.^{,} Chitose's own book, "Kempō Karate-dō" states that he learned this kata from Hanashiro Chōmo at Sōgen-ji. Historically, it has been handed down from Chitose that this kata was used in the royal ceremonies of the Ryūkyū Kingdom. The "salutation to all four sides" was of great significance during these ceremonies. Some Chitō-ryū groups practice an extended dai (大) version that contains a few additional techniques. Ryūsei Karate-do, a style derived from Chito-Ryu, also includes a version of Shihōhai.

=== Niseishi ===
The version of Niseishi (二十四歩, "twenty-four steps") shō (小, "small") or dai (大, "large") found in Chitō-ryū is unlike other versions of Niseishi. The kata actually bears a closer resemblance to a Fujian White Crane form called Hakutsuru. There are two versions of this kata in the Chitō-ryū syllabus, a shō (小, "small") form and a dai (大, "large") form. The dai version contains an additional sequence of movements not found in the shō version, but otherwise the kata are identical. The origins of the kata are credited to Chitose's first teacher, Aragaki Seishō. Niseishi is commonly used in preparation for training in Sanchin kata. Chitose also made modifications to the breathing techniques in the kata. There is a set of eleven Niseishi kaisetsu (解説, "explanation") techniques which are drawn from movements in the kata and are executed with a partner. These kaisetsu cover a variety of techniques including striking, kansetsu-waza (joint locking), kyūsho-waza (pressure point techniques) and take-downs.

=== Seisan ===
Seisan (正整, "correct arrangement") is a kata found in both Naha-te and Shuri-te lineages. The Chitō-ryū version most resembles the Shuri-te version passed on by Chōtoku Kyan. The kanji used in Chitō-ryū translates as: sei (正) - "correct"; san (整) - "arrangement or position". Traditionally, however, the kanji used for Seisan is 十三, or "thirteen". Seisan is possibly one of the oldest kata in Okinawa. Although not practiced in every style, Seisan appears in all three major Karate lineages in Okinawa--Shōrin-ryū, Gojū-ryū and Uechi-ryū.

=== Bassai ===
Bassai (抜塞) One of the most common kata in the Shōrin-ryū lineages, this kata is traditionally said to have originated with Sōkon Matsumura. The kanji used for Bassai are batsu (抜) - "to extract or remove"; sai (塞) - "close, shut, or cover". The accepted translation used for Bassai is "To Storm a Fortress". Although nothing in the two kanji translates to fortress, the character sai (塞) is used as part of words for fortress or stronghold, as in bōsai (防塞, "fort"). According to Chitose's book, "Kempō Karate-dō", he learned Bassai from Chōtoku Kyan. Chitō-ryū Bassai closely resembles Matsubayashi-ryū Passai as well as Seibukan Bassai, which are other styles in the Kyan/Arakaki lineage. Kyan learned his Bassai from a Tomari village master named Oyadomari Kokan. The version practiced by Chitō-ryū is very similar to the Oyadomari Bassai. Although Chitō-ryū Bassai is from Tomari village, it bears a striking resemblance to the Shuri versions of Bassai (the Bassai-dai from Shotokan, Shitō-ryū, and Shuri-ryū) are examples of the Shuri Bassai). The main difference between the Shuri version and the Tomari version are that the Shuri versions are done primarily with closed fists, while the Tomari versions are primarily open handed.

=== Chintō ===
Chintō (鎮東) is another kata common to the Shōrin-ryū lineages. It includes jumping, jumping kicks and intricate hand techniques. The Chitō-ryū version is done in a north–south pattern, unlike many other versions of Shōrin-ryū Chintō which are done at a north-west to south-east pattern.

=== Sōchin ===
While sharing a name with kata from other styles, the Chitō-ryū version of Sōchin (荘鎮) is completely different and seems to be Chitose's own creation. Distinctive elements of the Chitō-ryū version include defense and attack to all four sides and the bull like posture with the arms.

=== Rōhai ===
Rōhai (鷺牌) shō (小, "small") or dai (大, "large") in Chitō-ryū is a kata completely different from those in other styles, and it seems to be Chitose's own creation. It borrows from Fujian White Crane with movements similar to the Chitō-ryū Niseishi. It is a mix of closed fisted and open handed techniques with a one-kneed stance at the very beginning.

=== Tenshin ===
Tenshin (転身) is a complex kata with many twisting, dodging movements and complex timings. It is unique to the style in both name and form and is not found outside of Chitō-ryū derived styles. It was probably created by Chitose and doesn't seem derived from other kata.

=== Sanseiru ===
The name of the kata Sanseiru (三十六歩, "thirty-six steps") is pronounced irregularly. The pronunciation seems to be based on the Mandarin Chinese (三十六 sānshíliù). It seems, from comparing this kata to kata from other styles, that this is a version of the Shōrin-ryū lineage Gojūshiho (54 steps), which can be found in Shitō-ryū, or various Shōrin-ryū styles. It may be simply a shortened version of this kata.

=== Kusanku ===
The opening of the Chitō-ryū version of Kusanku (公相君) is nearly identical to the opening of the classical Shōrin-ryū versions found in other lineages. However, after these initial moves, the kata departs drastically. There are two versions that are commonly practiced, the sho and dai versions. The dai version doubles the length of the kata.

=== Ryūsan ===
Ryūsan (龍山, "Dragon mountain") is meant to mean "dragon climbing the mountain". It is not found in any other styles of karate outside of Chitō-ryū (except for Patrick McCarthy's Koryū style, but there is debate about where his kata comes from). It is completely open handed from beginning to end with stabbing fingers, ridge hand and knife-edge blocks and palm strikes. The stance transitions are complex with the trailing leg sometimes pulling up and creating a shorter seisan-dachi, which is unlike other kata in the style. There is a signature movement in the middle of the kata where the karateka stands on one leg, thrusts one hand straight up and one hand straight down, and then switches legs and hands. It is this movement that gives the kata its name.

=== Sanchin ===
Like Niseishi, Sanchin (三戦, "Three battles") is a very old kata that is also generally acknowledged as originating in southern China from the Fujian White Crane style of martial art. In Chinese styles this form is practiced with the use of open hands throughout, while in Chitō-ryū there is significant use of closed hands (fist). Ideally, it is supposed to take no less than seven minutes to perform properly and focuses on highly developed use of breathing techniques and shime. In Chitō-ryū, Sanchin is generally considered a senior dan kata, and is usually only required at levels above yondan.

=== Kihon Kata ===
- Zenshin Kotai (前進後退)
- Shime no Dosa (しめの形)
- Empi Kihon Dosa (基本の猿臂)
- Ni Juu Shichi Ko (二十七手技)
- Seiken no Migi Hidari (正拳の右・左)
- Shi Ho Wari (四方割)
- Kihon Kata Ichi (基本形一)
- Kihon Kata Ni (基本形二)
- Kihon Kata San (基本形三)
- Kihon Dosa Ichi
- Kihon Dosa Ni
- Kihon Dosa San
- Kihon Dosa Yon

=== Bunkai ===
- Niseishi Kaisetzu (二十四解説)
- Ju ni ko
- Nage no Kata
- Henshuho
- Hangeikiho/Hogeikiho
- Uketeho
- Hantenho
- Rintenho
- Tehodoki
- Seiken no Tori

=== Additional Kata ===
- Wansu
- Ananko
- Tensho
- Unsu
- Seichin
- Hoen
- Rochin
- Gung-fu no Kata

=== Kobudō kata associated with Chitō-ryū ===
- Sakugawa no Kun
- Shushi no Kun
- Sesoko no Kun
- Chinen no Bo
- Maezato-ryū
- Tawada-ryū
- Yabiku-ryū
- Chitō-ryū

== Chitō-ryū crest ==
The Chitō-ryū crest is an identifiable symbol, often worn by Chitō-ryū practitioners regardless of affiliation as a badge. The design was based on the original crest of the Japan Karatedo Federation (財団法人 全日本空手道連盟, Zaidan Hōjin Zen Nippon Karate-dō Renmei) founded by Toyama Kanken, of which Chitō-ryū is a member. There are four main parts to the Chitō-ryū crest:

- The outline of the crest represents Yata no Kagami (八咫鏡), the sacred mirror of Japan which stands for wisdom and honesty.
- The disc in the center of the crest is the Hinomaru (日の丸, "sun disc"). The sun is the cultural symbol of Japan, and the national symbol seen on the flag of Japan.
- The Japanese characters seen on the crest are 千唐流 空手道. These are read as Chitō-ryū karate-dō. Sometimes the characters may indicate a region such as "All U.S." (全米国, Zen Beikoku) or "All Japan" (全日本, Zen Nippon).
- The fourth element is no longer used on the crest of the Japan Karatedo Federation. It is known as "Clasping of the Hands in the Circle". The fingers clasping hands in a circle is representative of the way of karate. Many Eastern philosophies understand the belief in life as a continuity or a continual flow as seen in the mathematical symbol, the circle, a line without beginning or end. Within that circle lie two hands clasping together in apposition. Where one ends the other begins, continuously chasing each other year after year. The seasons are an example of contrasts; summer, winter, spring, and fall. Karate can also be seen to be like the seasons; hard and direct, soft and circular. It takes these two contrasting feelings to make a whole and, in the same way, karate requires a person to be hard and direct, soft and circular. Only when a student has mastered these two elements does he or she really know the way of karate.

== Shōwa ==
Shōwa (唱和) is the code of Chitō-ryū practitioners. It is often recited at the beginning & end of classes.

Japanese	Transliteration	English translation	French Translation
我々空手道を修行するものは 常に、武士道精神を忘れず 和と忍をもって成し そして、努めれば必ず達す	Ware Ware Karate-do oh Shugyo Surumonowa, Tsuneni Bushido Seishin oh Wasurezu, Wa to Nin Oh Motte Nashi, Soshite Tsutomereba Kanarazu Tassu.	We who study karate-do, Will never forget the spirit of the warriors way. With peace, perseverance and hard work, We will reach our goal.	Nous qui étudions le Karaté-do Nous ne devons jamais oublier l'esprit du Guerrier Dans la paix, la persévérance et le travail Nous atteindrons notre but sans faute.

== Chitō-ryū around the world ==
=== Canada ===
Chitō-ryū is a popular mainstream karate style in Canada. There are almost 60 Chito-ryū dojo in 8 of Canada's 10 provinces. Chitose first visited Canada in 1967, accompanied by protégé Mamoru Yamamoto (who would later go on to found Yōshūkai Karate-dō). This trip was organized by Masami Tsuruoka, recognized as the father of Canadian karate by Black Belt Magazine, who was then head of Chitō-ryū in Canada. During this trip, Chitose presided over events at the Canadian National Karate Tournament in Toronto and conducted clinics at dōjō across Canada. The current head of the Chitō-ryū style, the son of Chitose, continued this practice, conducting clinics in Canada for Chitō-ryū practitioners approximately every other year. However, in 2008, a rift occurred between the Canadian Chito-ryū Karate-dō Association and the Japanese parent organization. The result was that the Canadian association and approximately three quarters of the Canadian dōjō agreed to separate from Japan and became independent. Dōjō in British Columbia, Alberta, Saskatchewan, Prince Edward Island and Nova Scotia remain associated with the parent organization in Japan.

The Canadian Chitō-ryū Karate-dō Association is now an independent organization headed by Shane Higashi, who formerly held the titles Kyōshi (教士) and the Vice Sō-honbuchō (総本部長) for Chitō-ryū. Higashi was recently awarded the title of Hanshi (範士) and 10th dan (十段). Higashi studied under Masami Tsuruoka, becoming his first black belt student, and also briefly lived with and studied under Chitō-ryū founder Chitose. Higashi and Tsuruoka were inducted into the Canadian Black Belt Hall of Fame in 2007 and 2006, respectively. The others, who chose to remain loyal to the Japanese parent organization, formed the new organization Chito Ryu Canada ICKF. Chris Taneda, Kyoshi and 7th Dan, is their most senior instructor.

=== Australia ===
The International Chito-Ryu Karate-do Federation of Australia (ICKFA) is the governing association for Chitō-ryū dōjō in Australia.

Chitō-ryū was introduced to Australia by Vance Prince in 1969, after studying in Toronto, Ontario, Canada under Shane Higashi. He trained for three months in Kumamoto, Japan under Tsuyoshi Chitose. His first dōjō was the North Sydney Leagues Club. Over the next six years Prince trained and qualified six black belt students, who went on to establish clubs throughout Australia. Prince was also a founding member of the Federation Of Australia Karate-Do Organisations.

In the late 1970s Bill Ker was appointed president and honbuchō (本部長) for Chitō-ryū in Australia. He later gained the rank of 4th dan (四段). In 1991 Ker retired from active involvement in Chitō-ryū. Upon his retirement, Brian Hayes was appointed president and honbucho by Chitose.

In November 2004, Michael J Noonan was appointed to represent Chitose and the ICKF in Australia as honbucho. Noonan was Bill Ker's student from 1980 until his retirement. In 1985 he travelled to Japan and became a direct student of the 2nd Generation Soke, a relationship that he has continued. Noonan currently teaches at the Tasseikan dōjō in Sydney and has been granted the rank of 7th dan (七段) and title of Kyoshi. In 2023 Noonan was appointed Advisor to the 3rd Generation Soke and made the Technical Director of Europe. He has held seminars in the US, Scotland, Ireland, Norway and Germany, as well as his home country of Australia, and has also instructed in Japan and Canada. Other notable senior instructors supporting Noonan in his role include; Mark Snow, 5th dan Renshi; Martin Phillips, 5th dan, Renshi and Head of Kobujutsu for Australia; Sandra Phillips 5th dan Renshi and National Coach, Adam Higgins, 4th dan, Shihan.

=== United States ===
==== United States Chitō-ryū Karate Federation ====
The United States Chitō-ryū Karate Federation is an independent non-profit federation of Chitō-ryū dōjō in the United States. It was established by William J. and Barbara E. Dometrich. The hombu-dōjō is located in Covington, Kentucky.

==== U.S.A. Yoshukai Karate Association ====
The U.S.A. Yoshukai Karate Association is a karate association headed by Michael G. Foster. Yoshukai is a Japanese karate style adapted from Chitō-ryū by Mamoru Yamamoto. Foster was originally named the Director of the U.S.A. Yoshukai Karate Association in 1966 by Mamoru Yamamoto, when it was affiliated with the United States Chitō-ryū Karate Federation. In this capacity, Foster established and headed a number of karate schools which were then part of the United States Chitō-ryū Karate Federation. The dōjō became independent Yoshukai schools 1971.

==== Koshin-ha Chitō-ryū Karate Association ====
The Koshin-ha Chitō-ryū Karate-do Association was formed in 2004 by several senior ranking American Chitō-ryū practitioners. Unlike many martial arts organizations run by a single person, the Koshin-ha is governed by two groups of individuals: senior practitioners (known collectively as the Shihan-kai), and dōjō chief instructors (known collectively as the Shibu-kai).

== Bibliography ==
- Kempo Karate-dō — Universal Art of Self-Defense (拳法空手道一般の護身術) by Tsuyoshi Chitose, ISBN 0-9687791-0-7. The seminal textbook by the founder of Chitō-ryū Karate-dō.
- The Endless Quest — The Autobiography of an American Karate Pioneer by William J. Dometrich, ISBN 0-9687791-1-5.
