= Camp Wood (military base) =

U.S. military base in Japan

Camp Wood was a U.S. military base, located at the southern end of Japan, near Kumamoto.

== Former use ==
The camp's buildings once housed a Japanese cavalry unit.

The 24th Division was stationed here during the occupation of Japan until the start of the Korean War.

Americans stationed in Japan post-World War II were rated by ability in their closeness to MacArthur. Camp Wood was the farthermost post in Japan and the poorest class soldiers were stationed here.

Camp Wood, near Kumamoto, was the post Korea armistice station for half of the 187th Airborne Regimental Combat Team—The Rakkasans. One of the most famous and highly decorated such units in the history of the US Army. The other part of the 187th occupied the installation at Bepu. The 187th survives in the 101st Airborne as the 3rd Brigade.

US military dependents had a one-building 12-grade school, Cub and Brownie with Boy Scouts and Girl Scouts. The Boy Scout troop 38 won the Far East Council camping competition held at Kagoshima Bay in 1954. Children were vaccinated with Gamma Globulin during the polio scare.

There was a nine-hole golf course with black cinder "greens".

Frequent earth tremors sourced from nearby Mt. Aso which could be seen glowing most nights. Children made trips to Mt. Aso and various places...shrines, tea farms, a TB sanatorium.

The 187th paratroopers were dropped at the Oyonohara drop zone for training jumps by the Thai Air Force.

In 1955, the 187th gyroscoped back to Fort Bragg, NC. They were replaced by the 508 ARCT .

== Famous residents ==
- Kenneth R. Shadrick, first reported American casualty of the Korean War.
- Dr. John Charles Nemeth, eventual Eagle Scout from the beginning at Camp Wood, former Georgia Tech faculty member, VP of Oak Ridge Associated Universities, and CEO and Executive Director of Sigma Xi, The Scientific Research Honor Society.
- Sgt Major John Nemeth, one of 204 soldiers to earn CIBs in three wars (WWII, KOREA, and VIET NAM), three accompanying Purple Hearts, three Bronze Stars with V and Oak leaf clusters, and the Silver Star.
