= Shuri-ryū =

Eclectic martial arts system developed by Robert Trias

- Focus: Striking and eclectic
- Hardness: Hard and soft
- Country of origin: United States
- Creator: Robert Trias
- Famous practitioners: Pat Miletich, Mark Northcutt, Eric Guadiana
- Parenthood: Karate (Goju-ryu, Shito-ryu, Shotokan), Xingyiquan, Judo

Shuri-ryū (首里流) karate is an eclectic martial arts system developed by Robert Trias (1923–1989), reportedly the first American to teach a form of karate in the mainland United States, who opened his first public dojo in 1946 in Phoenix, Arizona.

== History ==
Shuri-ryū is a style that has a lineage coming from a variety of sources, including karate. Other influences include xingyiquan.

Trias was first introduced to karate while in the Navy during World War II when he was stationed in the Solomon Islands. In 1944, Robert Trias met Tung Gee Hsing and began training with him. Hsing practiced the Chinese system of xingyiquan and had reportedly cross-trained with Motobu Chōki in the Okinawan village of Kume Mura several years previously. Later, Trias reportedly studied with Hoy Yuan Ping in Singapore in 1944.

In addition to these teachers, Trias learned from other martial arts teachers, such as Yajui Yamada (judo), Gogen Yamaguchi (Gōjū-ryū), Roy Oshiro (Gōjū-ryū), Yasuhiro Konishi (Shindō jinen-ryū), Makoto Gima (Shotokan, Shitō-ryū), and others. Both Konishi and Gima served as mentors to Trias instead of in a formal teacher-student relationship. Konishi recognized and countersigned Trias's promotion certificate to 9th Dan by the USKA in the 1960s. Gima recognized Trias as the 10th Dan in 1983.

== Techniques ==
In addition to the punches, blocks, and kicks of karate, Shuri-ryū also incorporates joint locks, takedowns and throws, and kobudō (traditional weapons). Shuri-ryū follows a system of teachings called the Haryu, which are identifiers of the system.

Shuri-ryū also has several short combinations. These include 26 ippon (ippon kumite kata); 10 taezu (taezu naru waza); 30 kihon; eight sen-te motions; and seven kogeki-ho ho. In addition, there are training exercises including form sparring (kata kumite), focus stance sparring (kime dachi kumite), free exercise (jiyū undō), and free sparring (jiyū kumite).

== Kata ==
Shuri-ryū has three form exercises called Taikyoku Ichi, Ni, and San to prepare the student to learn the 15 core forms (kata):

- Wansu
- Anaku
- Naihanchi Shō (Tekki Shodan)
- Empi Shō (Wanshu)
- Sanchin
- Tsue Shō
- Bassai Dai
- Gopei Shō
- Danenn Shō
- Naihanchi Ni (Tekki Nidan)
- Nandan shō (Nijūshiho / Niseishi)
- Kankū Shō (Kusanku Shō)
- Tekatana
- Naihanchi San (Tekki Sandan)
- Tensho

There are other variations of Sanchin and Tenshō. The senior sensei of Shuri-ryū also teach several other forms, such as Shudoso and art, which teach Hakutsuru Shodan, Nidan, Sandan, and Yondan.

== Ranks ==
The Shuri-ryū Style uses a belt system to designate rank. The ranking system was written out in The Pinnacle of Karate by Trias, which called for 8 ranks below black belt (Kyu) and 10 above (Dan). Some schools award various informal ranks in the interim.

- White (8th Kyu – hachikyu, unless additional informal ranks are included)
- Interim Ranks (Informal ranks of Orange, Gold, "Black Dot", and/or various stripes are awarded at some schools)
- Yellow (7th Kyu – shichikyu, student officially becomes a member of the Shuri-ryū Style)
- Blue (6th Kyu – rokukyu)
- Green (5th Kyu – gokyu)
- Purple (4th Kyu yonkyu)
- Brown (3rd Kyu – sankyu, 2nd Kyu – nikyu, 1st Kyu ikkyu)
- Black (1st Dan – shodan through 10th Dan – judan)

At each rank, the students, depending on rank (blue = 1 mile, purple and beyond = 2 miles) must pass the running activity, lift 10 or 15 lb weights 75 times over the head (depending on gender), perform 500–1000 front kicks, and perform various hand technique exercises.

Upon receiving the rank of Yellow Belt, the student officially becomes a member of the Shuri-ryū Style. The student may wear a white and green patch showing the emblem of the system. At the rank of Black Belt, the student may wear a black and green system patch. If awarded the position of Assistant Chief Instructor, a red circle (and sometimes a half-sun) is added. Once receiving the position of Chief Instructor, the full-style emblem is worn, consisting of a red circle, a red sun, and a black pine tree on a green background.

== Chief Instructors ==
At the time of his death in 1989, Trias had designated 8 Chief Instructors and 3 assistant Chief Instructors of the Shuri-ryū system to perpetuate Shuri-ryū: Roberta Trias-Kelley, the late John Pachivas, Robert Bowles, the late Ridgely Abele, Pete Rabino, the late Michael Awad, Dale Benson, and the late Dirk (Yozan) Mosig. Others had previously been named to this position, but had subsequently resigned or were removed (Phillip Koeppel, Victor Moore, Randy Holman, John Hutchcroft)

Traditionally, a karate system was owned by the family of the founder. Upon Trias's death in 1989, his daughter, Roberta Trias-Kelley, inherited the Shuri-ryū system as a Style Head. While Dirk Mosig followed her leadership, the majority of members did not. In 1995, John Pachivas appointed Robert Bowles as style head of Shuri-ryū. Bowles founded the International Shuri-ryū Association (ISA), and has subsequently named new Chief Instructors and Assistant Chief Instructors in his organization. Shuri-ryū stylists can be found in the United States Karate-Do Kai (USKK), an organization founded by Phillip Koeppel. Michael Awad has appointed several new Chief Instructors from the USKK group.

The instructors below are either written out to be Chief Instructors in "The Pinnacle of Karate" or are affiliated with the ISA, USKK, and TWKA.

=== Trias Appointed Chief Instructors ===
- Roberta Trias-Kelley PhD (menkyo kaiden), 10th Dan, Arizona
- Robert Bowles, 10th Dan, Indiana
- John Pachivas (deceased),10th Dan, Florida
- Ridgely Abele (deceased), 9th Dan, South Carolina
- Pete Rabino, 9th Dan, California
- Dale Benson, 9th Dan, Arizona
- Michael Awad (deceased), 9th Dan, Ohio
- Dirk Mosig PhD (deceased), 8th Dan, Nebraska

=== Trias Appointed Assistant Chief Instructors ===
- James McLain (deceased) ("half sun" Assistant Chief Instructor), 9th Dan, Tennessee
- Wendi Dragonfire ("half sun" Assistant Chief Instructor), 9th Dan, Netherlands
- Rudy Pavletic (deceased) ("half sun" Assistant Chief Instructor), Indiana
- Joseph W. Walker (deceased), 9th Dan, Illinois/Texas
- Johnny Linebarger, 8th Dan, Arizona
- Tony Bisanz, 9th Dan, Arizona

=== ISA Affiliated Chief Instructors ===
- Robert Bowles, 10th Dan, Indiana
- Ridgley Abele (deceased), 9th Dan, South Carolina
- Dale Benson, 9th Dan, Arizona
- Joseph W. Walker (deceased), 9th Dan, Illinois/Texas
- Sandra Bowles, 9th Dan, Michigan
- George Sheridan Jr., 9th Dan, Indiana
- Tony Bisanz, 9th Dan, Arizona
- Glenn Wallace, 9th Dan, Indiana
- Dennis Wagner (deceased), 8th Dan, Indiana
- Johnny Linebarger, 8th Dan, Arizona
- Vitus Bilking (deceased), 8th Dan, Denmark
- Lon Bradfield, 9th Dan, Colorado
- Niels Larsen, 8th Dan, Denmark
- Luis Lugo, 9th Dan, Florida
- Gus Lugo, 8th Dan, Florida
- Joe Pounder, 7th Dan, Wisconsin
- Todd Sullivan, 6th Dan, Indiana
- Joey Johnston, 6th Dan, Illinois
- Donna Judge, 9th Dan, Florida
- John R. Venson, 9th Dan, Illinois
- Rick Scoppe, 7th Dan, South Carolina

As of July 2026.

=== ISA Affiliated Assistant Chief Instructors ===
- Brenda Armentrout, 8th Dan, Indiana
- Reginald Venson, 7th Dan, California
- John Wong, 7th Dan, Florida
- Amanda Kaufman, 6th Dan, Ohio
- Anna Gorman, 5th Dan, New Mexico
- Rodolpho Rodriguez, 7th Dan, Venezuela

as of July 2026

=== USKK Affiliated Chief Instructors ===
- Michael Awad (deceased), 9th Dan, Ohio
- David Hamann, 9th Dan, Ohio
- Richard Awad, 7th Dan, Ohio

=== USKK Affiliated Assistant Chief Instructors ===
- James McLain (deceased), 9th Dan, Tennessee
- Nate England, 6th Dan, Ohio
