= Karate Canada =

Organization

Karate Canada, National Karate Association (NKA)
- Founded: 1964
- Founder: Mas Tsuruoka
- Type: Sports association
- Purpose: Development of karate as a sport in Canada
- Location: Canada
- Region served: Canadian provinces and territories
- Website: karatecanada.org

Karate Canada is the national association representing the sport of Karate in Canada. Formerly the National Karate Association (NKA) of Canada, the organization was founded by Masami Tsuruoka.

== History ==
In 1964, Masami Tsuruoka and four other karate instructors incorporated the association in the cities of Toronto, Winnipeg, Calgary, Montreal and Quebec City, and Tsuruoka was elected the first president of the organization. The NMA was organized to promote and develop the art of traditional karate in Canada into a respected sport and to provide a framework for Canadian competitors to gain international recognition.

In March 2009 the NKA assembled its National Council, chairs of key committees, athlete representatives and select provincial and territorial representatives for a strategic planning retreat where they voted to investigate changing the name of the organization to Karate Canada.

Today Karate Canada represents several traditional karate styles active in Canada. Karate Canada includes all ten provinces and two territories and is recognized as the national sport governing body of karate in Canada by the Canadian Federal Government. It is partially funded through Sport Canada. Each province and territory has a local organization which represents their interests and concerns at the national level, and is responsible for the standards and development of traditional karate within their respective provincial or territorial jurisdictions.

Karate Canada is the only national Canadian karate organization recognized by the Canadian Olympic Committee (COC) and the Pan American Games. Karate Canada conducts annual competitions, and the winners are the only karate athletes recognized as national champions by the COC and Sport Canada.
