= Chatan Yara =

Okinawan karateka

- Born: 1668; Shuri, Ryūkyū Kingdom
- Died: 1756 (aged 87–88)
- Style: Te
- Teacher(s): Wong Chung-Yoh, Kusanku

Other information
- Notable students: Peichin Takahara

Chatan Yara (北谷 屋良, Chatan Yara; 1668–1756), also known as Ueekata, and Yomitan Yara, is credited with being one of the first to disseminate martial arts (te) throughout Okinawa Island. Yara is most noted for teaching Takahara Peichin who would later become the sensei (mentor) of Sakugawa Kanga (1733-1815), the father of Okinawan karate. Depending on Sakugawa's birth date, Yara may have been his teacher also (based on the kata he taught).

Yara was from Chatan Village, on Okinawa Island.

There is a popular Shito-Ryu kata named 'Chatanyara Kushanku', the kata was taught to Teruo Hayashi by Nagamine Shoshin. Chatanyara kushanku is one of many variants of the popular 'Kushanku' family of katas taught on Okinawa.

== Biography ==
According to most accounts, Yara's parents sent him to China at the age of 12 under the advice of his uncle to study the Chinese language and the martial arts. It was here he mastered the use of the bō and sai under the guidance of his teacher Wong Chung-Yoh.

Shortly after returning to Shuri around 1700, Yara came to the assistance of a woman being harassed by a samurai. First avoiding the samurai's sword attacks, Yara acquired an eku (oar) from a nearby boat and successfully disarmed and killed the samurai. Soon after this rescue, he was recruited by local officials to teach his martial art to the local community for the purpose of self-defense.

Chatan Yara is credited as the originator of the popular (Chatan) Yara Kusanku, Chatan Yara no Sai (iron truncheon), and Chatan Yara no Kon (6 foot staff) kata that are commonly found in Okinawan martial arts. His son, known as Yara Guwa ("Little Yara") is the developer of the well-known Yara Guwa no Tonfa kata.

== See also ==
- Pechin
