= Ryukyu Kobudo =

Style of Okinawan martial arts

- Focus: Weaponry
- Country of origin: Okinawa Prefecture, Japan
- Creator: Taira Shinken
- Parenthood: Ryukyu Kobujutsu Research Association
- Official website: https://www.ryukyu-kobudo.net/

Ryukyu Kobudo is the branch of Okinawan Kobudo developed and systemized by Taira Shinken under the Ryukyu Kobudo Hozon Shinko Kai association.

Ryukyu Kobudo uses the following weapons: Bō (in various lengths), Sai, Eku, Kama, Tinbe-Rochin, Tekko, Nunchaku, Tonfa and Surujin.

== Ryūkyū Kobudo Hozon Shinko Kai ==
The Ryūkyū Kobudo Hozon Shinko Kai (Society for the Promotion and Preservation of Ryukyuan Kobudo) was founded after World War II by Taira Shinken.

It is a recreation of the Ryukyu Kobujutsu Research Association founded by his teacher Yabiku Moden in 1911 and disbanded during the Second World War.

The Society preserves the kata learned by Moden:

- karate from Ankō Itosu
- Yamanni-ryū style bojutsu from Sanda Chinen
- kobudo from Tawata nu Meigantu
- sai from Sanda Kanagusuku

Taira named Eisuke Akamine (1 May 1925 - 13 Jan 1999) as his successor and the second President for Ryūkyū Kobudo Hozon Shinko Kai. He was later succeeded by Hiroshi Akamine, the third President. Hiroshi Sensei decided to start his own association in 2011 (see below). The present Head of the association is Sensei Yukio Kuniyoshi. He was the chief instructor in the Eisuke Akamine Dojo in Tomigusuku, Okinawa until the death of Akamine Dai sensei (1999) and is practicing at Kochinda Dojo, Okinawa.

== Ryūkyū Kobudo Shimbukan ==
In 2011 Akamine Hiroshi resigned as the President of the Ryukyu Kobudo Hozon Shinko Kai and formed the Ryukyu Kobudo Shimbukan association, which practice in the Nesabu Shimbukan Dojo in Tomigusuku.

== Ryukyu Kobudo Tesshinkan ==
The Ryukyu Kobudo Tesshinkan was created by Tamayose Hidemi in 1999 with permission to create from his Sensei Eisuke Akamine. Tamayose had achieved his 7th degree black belt at the time, and has since achieved 9 Dan under the Okinawa Ken Kobudo Renmei. He teaches Kobudo around the world via seminar as well as his home dojo in Tomigusuku Okinawa. His United States Branch (NKKF) was awarded the USA Honbu title in 2001. His Son, Tetsushi is slated to presidency of the Tesshinkan in the near future.
