= Higa Peechin =

Okinawan karateka

Higa Peechin (比嘉 親雲上) (1790–1870), also known as Machuu Hijaa (マチュー ヒジャー), was a prominent martial artist in Ryūkyūan history. He is considered a foundational influence on the development of karate and kobudo, particularly bōjutsu. The little Pechin (親雲上, Peechin) denoted his status within the scholar-official class of the Ryūkyū Kingdom. A resident of Hamahiga island, Higa is traditionally believed to have studied quan fa under Chinese emissaries, including Zhang Xue Li and Wanshu. However, Ryūkyūan history relied heavily on oral tradition prior to the 20th century, making it difficult to distinguish historical fact from legend.

Despite standing only 5 feet 2 inches (157 cm) and weighing approximately 140 pounds (64 kg). Higa was legendary for his physical strength. Storied claim he possessed "forearms like tree trunks" and could crush coconuts with his bare hands. According to folklore, Higa successfully defended against both Japanese pirates and head-hunters from Formosa (Taiwan) using his bō, never losing a battle.

There has been significant historical confusion regarding Higa’s lineage. While often mistakenly cited as the teacher of Takahara Peechin (who taught Sakugawa Kanga), this is chronologically impossible- Takahara (1683-1760) died 30 years before Higa was born.

Higa was among the first to codify a formal system of kata and techniques. His legacy persists in several weapon katas still practiced today, especially those involving the tonfa, sai, and bō.

Historical records, such as Taira Shinken's Ryukyu Kobudo Taikan (1964), suggest there may have been an earlier martial artists from Hamahiga with a similar title. He lived from 1663 to 1738 and demonstrated Tode and Saijutsu to the 5th Tokugawa shogun.

== See also ==
- Pechin
