= Kuwa =

Kuwa or KUWA may refer to:

== Places ==
- old name of Dhrangadhra (princely State) in (British) India
- alternative spelling Quba (also Guba), city in Azerbaijan, capital of the :
  - Quba Rayon (district) of Azerbaijan
  - Quba Khanate (1726–1806), a quasi-independent principality

== Other uses ==
- Kuwa (桑, ”morus”)
  - Japanese destroyer Kuwa, two destroyers of the Imperial Japanese Navy
- Kuwa (鍬, ”hoe”)
  - Kuwa (weapon), one of the many Okinawan weapons, based on a hoe
- KUWA, an American radio call sign
- Kuwa language (disambiguation)

== People with the name ==
- George Kuwa (1885–1931), Japanese and American Issei film actor of the silent era
- Yousif Kuwa (1945–2001), Sudanese revolutionary and politician
