= Okinawan kobudō =

Weapons systems of Okinawan martial arts

Okinawan Kobudō
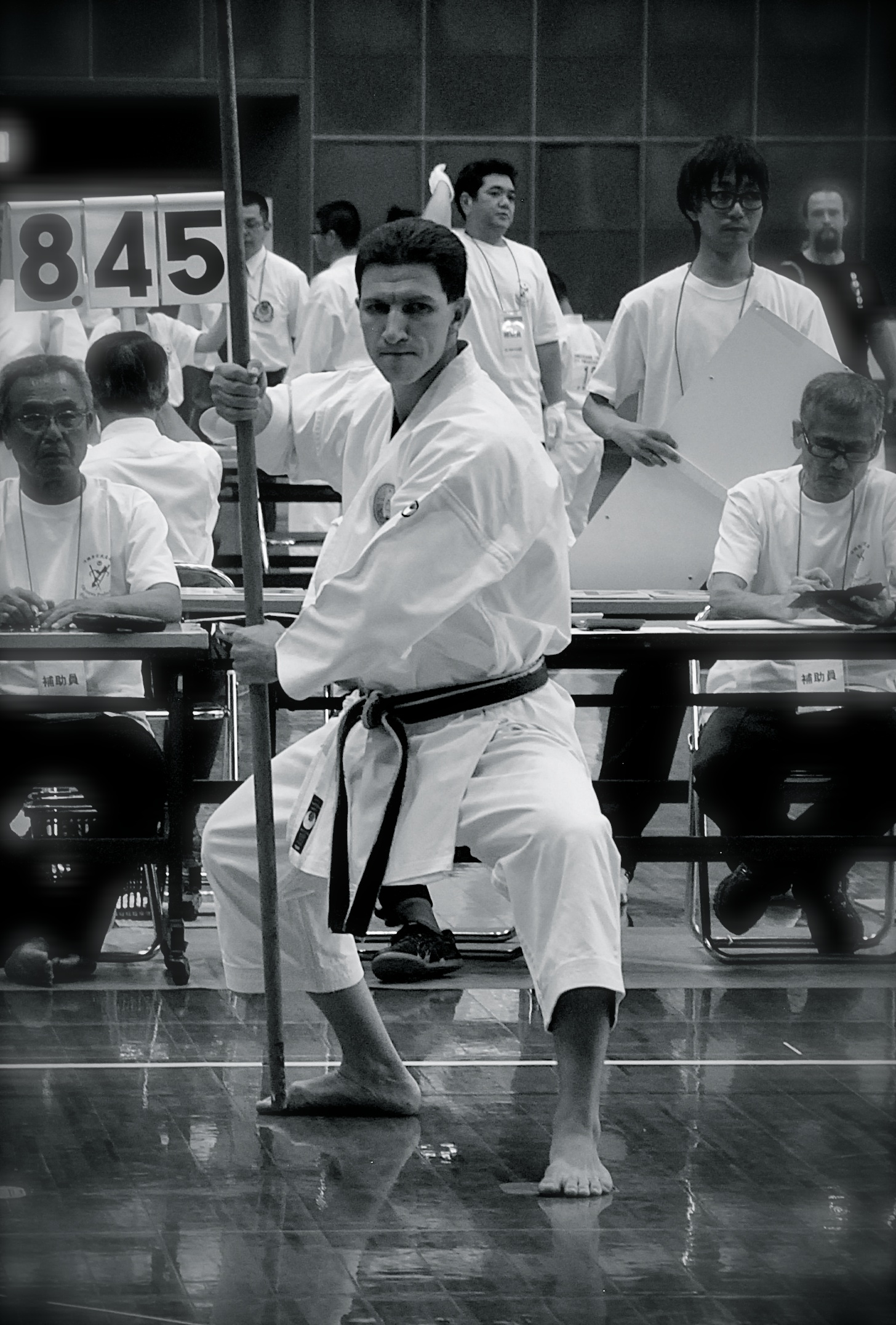
- World Kobudo Championships 2015
- Focus: Weapons
- Hardness: No contact
- Country of origin: Ryukyu Kingdom
- Olympic sport: No

Okinawan kobudō (沖縄古武道), literally "old martial way of Okinawa", is the weapon systems of Okinawan martial arts.

== Etymology and definition ==
Okinawan kobudō is a Japanese term that can be translated as "old martial way of Okinawa". It is a generic term coined in the twentieth century.

Okinawan kobudō refers to the weapon systems of Okinawan martial arts. These systems can have from one to as many as a dozen weapons in their curriculum, among them kon (six foot staff), sai (short-handled trident), tonfa (handled club), kama (sickle), and nunchaku (two rope- or chain-connected sticks), but also the tekko (knuckledusters), tinbe-rochin (shield and spear), and surujin (weighted chain). Less common Okinawan weapons include the tambo (short stick), the hanbō (middle length staff) and the eku (boat oar of traditional Okinawan design).

Okinawan kobudō is distinguished from the general term kobudō, which refers to all Japanese martial arts that predate the Meiji Restoration.

== History ==
It is a popular story and common belief that Okinawan farming tools evolved into weapons due to restrictions placed upon the peasants by the Satsuma samurai clan when the island was made a part of Japan, which forbade them from carrying arms. As a result, it is said, they were defenseless and developed a fighting system around their traditional farming implements. However, modern martial arts scholars have been unable to find historical backing for this story, and the evidence uncovered by various martial historians points to the Pechin Warrior caste in Okinawa as being those who practiced and studied various martial arts, rather than the Heimin, or commoner. It is true that Okinawans, under the rule of foreign powers, were prohibited from carrying weapons or practicing with them in public. But the weapons-based fighting that they secretly practiced (and the types of weapons they practiced with) had strong Chinese roots, and examples of similar weapons have been found in China, Thailand and Indonesia pre-dating the Okinawan adaptations.

Okinawan kobudō systems were shaped by indigenous Okinawan techniques that arose within the Aji, or noble class, and by imported methods from China and Southeast Asia. The majority of Okinawan kobudō traditions that survived the difficult times during and following World War II were preserved and handed down by Taira Shinken (Ryūkyū Kobudō Hozon Shinkokai), Chogi Kishaba (Ryūkyū Bujustsu Kenkyu Doyukai), and Kenwa Mabuni (Shito-ryū). Practical systems were developed by Toshihiro Oshiro and Motokatsu Inoue in conjunction with these masters. Other noted masters who have Okinawan kobudō kata named after them include Chōtoku Kyan, Shigeru Nakamura, Kanga Sakukawa, and Shinko Matayoshi.

Okinawan kobudō arts are thought by some to be the forerunner of the bare hand martial art of karate, and several styles of that art include some degree of Okinawan kobudō training as part of their curriculum. Similarly, it is not uncommon to see an occasional kick or other empty-hand technique in an Okinawan kobudō kata. The techniques of the two arts are closely related in some styles, evidenced by the empty-hand and weapon variants of certain kata: for example, Kankū-dai and Kankū-sai, and Gojūshiho and Gojūshiho-no-sai, although these are examples of Okinawan kobudō kata which have been developed from karate kata and are not traditional Okinawan kobudō forms. Other more authentic Okinawan kobudō kata demonstrate elements of empty hand techniques as is shown in older forms such as Soeishi No Dai, a bo form which is one of the few authentic Okinawan kobudō kata to make use of a kick as the penultimate technique. Some Okinawan kobudō kata have undergone less "modern development" than karate and still retain much more of the original elements, reflections of which can be seen in even more modern karate kata. The connection between empty hand and weapon methods can be directly related in systems such as that formulated in order to preserve both arts such as Inoue/Taira's Ryūkyū Kobujutsu Hozon Shinko Kai and Motokatsu Inoue's Yuishinkai Karate Jutsu. M. Inoue draws direct comparisons between the use of certain weapons and various elements of empty hand technique such as sai mirroring haito/shuto waza, tonfa reflecting that of uraken and hijiate, and kama of kurite and kakete, as examples. The footwork in both methods is interchangeable.

== Weapons and kata ==
Okinawan kobudō was at its peak some 100 years ago and of all the authentic Okinawan kobudō kata practiced at this time, only relatively few, by comparison, remain extant. In the early 20th century, a decline in the study of Ryūkyū kobujutsu (as it was known then) meant that the future of this martial tradition was in danger. During the Taishō period (1912–1926) some martial arts exponents such as Yabiku Moden made great inroads in securing the future of Ryūkyū kobujutsu. Many of the forms that are still known are due to the efforts of Taira Shinken who travelled around the Ryūkyū Islands in the early part of the 20th century and compiled 42 existing kata, covering various types of Okinawan weapons. Whilst Taira Shinken may not have been able to collect all extant Okinawan kobudō kata, those he did manage to preserve are listed here. They do not include all those from the Matayoshi, Uhuchiku and Yamanni streams however.

=== Bō ===
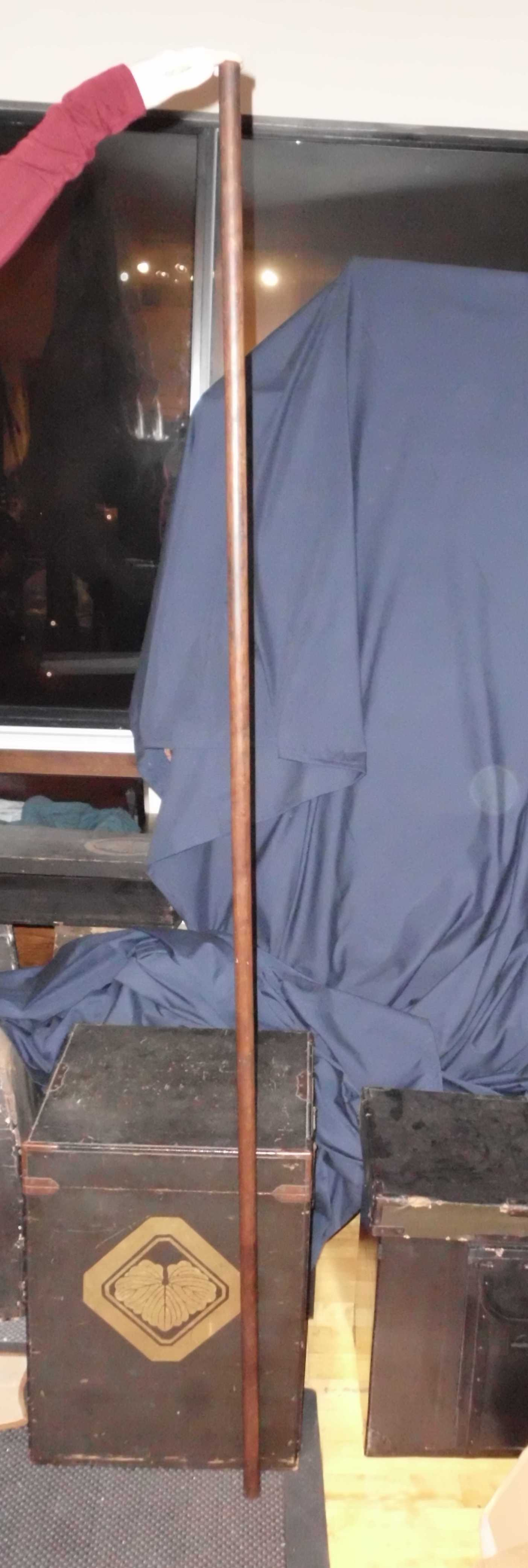
Bō staff

The bō is a six-foot long staff, sometimes tapered at both ends. It was perhaps developed from a farming tool called a tenbin: a stick placed across the shoulders with baskets or sacks hanging from either end. The bo was also possibly used as the handle to a rake or a shovel. The bo, along with shorter variations such as the jo and hanbō could also have been developed from walking sticks used by travelers, especially monks. The bo is considered the 'king' of the Okinawa weapons, as all others exploit its weaknesses in fighting it. The bo is the earliest of all Okinawan weapons (and effectively one of the earliest of all weapons in the form of a basic staff), and is traditionally made from red or white oak. Notable bō kata (froms) include:

- Shishi No Kun (or Shushi No Kon)
- Ufugusuku No Kun

=== Sai ===
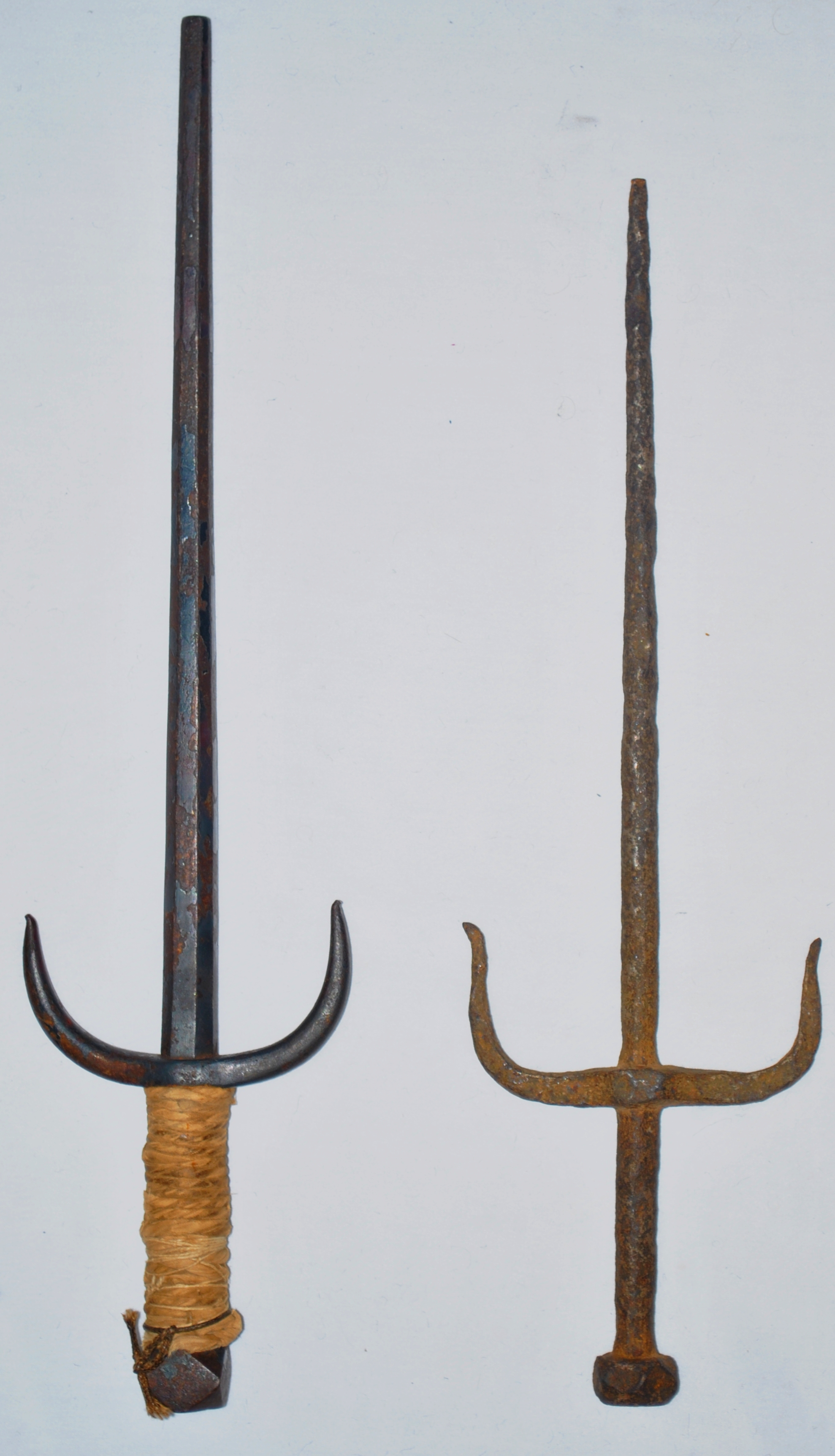
Sai

The sai is a pointed melee weapon resembling a short-handled trident, sometimes mistakenly believed to be a variation on a small, hand-held rake. This is highly unlikely as metal on Okinawa was in short supply at this time and a stick would have served this purpose more satisfactorily for a poor commoner. The sai appears similar to a short sword, but is not bladed, being only sharp at the points of the prongs. The weapon is made of metal with the main prong's length dependent upon the forearm of the user. The two shorter side prongs on the opposite sides of the main prong are used for catching, trapping, and breaking other weapons such as a sword or bo. A version of the weapon known as nunti sai or manji sai (due to its appearance resembling the swastika kanji) has the two shorter side prongs point in the opposite directions.

=== Tonfa ===
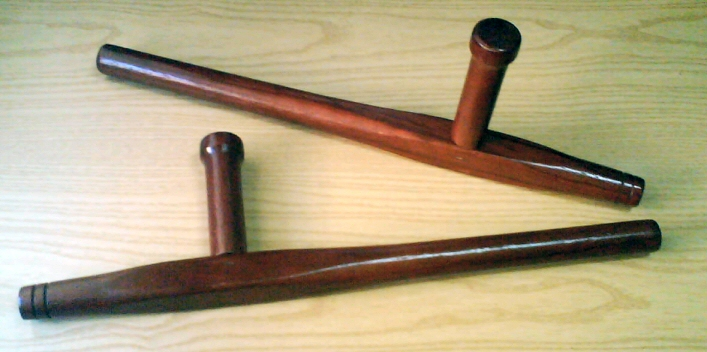
Tonfas

The tonfa may have originated as the handle of a millstone used for grinding grain. It is traditionally made from red oak, and can be gripped by the short perpendicular handle or by the longer main shaft. As with all Okinawan weapons, many of the forms are reflective of "empty hand" techniques. The tonfa is more readily recognized by its modern development in the form of the side-handle police baton, but many traditional tonfa techniques differ from side-handle baton techniques. For example, tonfa are often used in pairs, while side-handle batons generally are not.

=== Kama ===
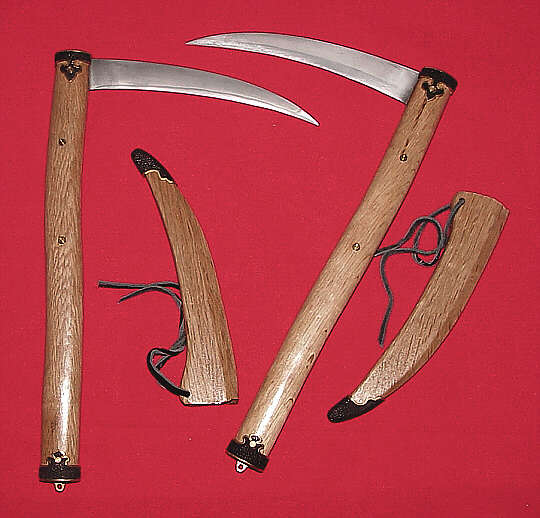
Kama

The kama is a traditional farming sickle, and considered one of the hardest to learn due to the inherent danger in practicing with such a weapon. The point at which the blade and handle join in the "weapon" model normally has a nook with which a bo can be trapped, although this joint proved to be a weak point in the design, and modern day examples tend to have a shorter handle with a blade that begins following the line of the handle and then bends, though to a lesser degree; this form of the kama is known as the natagama. The edge of a traditional rice sickle, such as one would purchase from a Japanese hardware store, continues to the handle without a notch, as this is not needed for its intended use.

=== Nunchaku ===
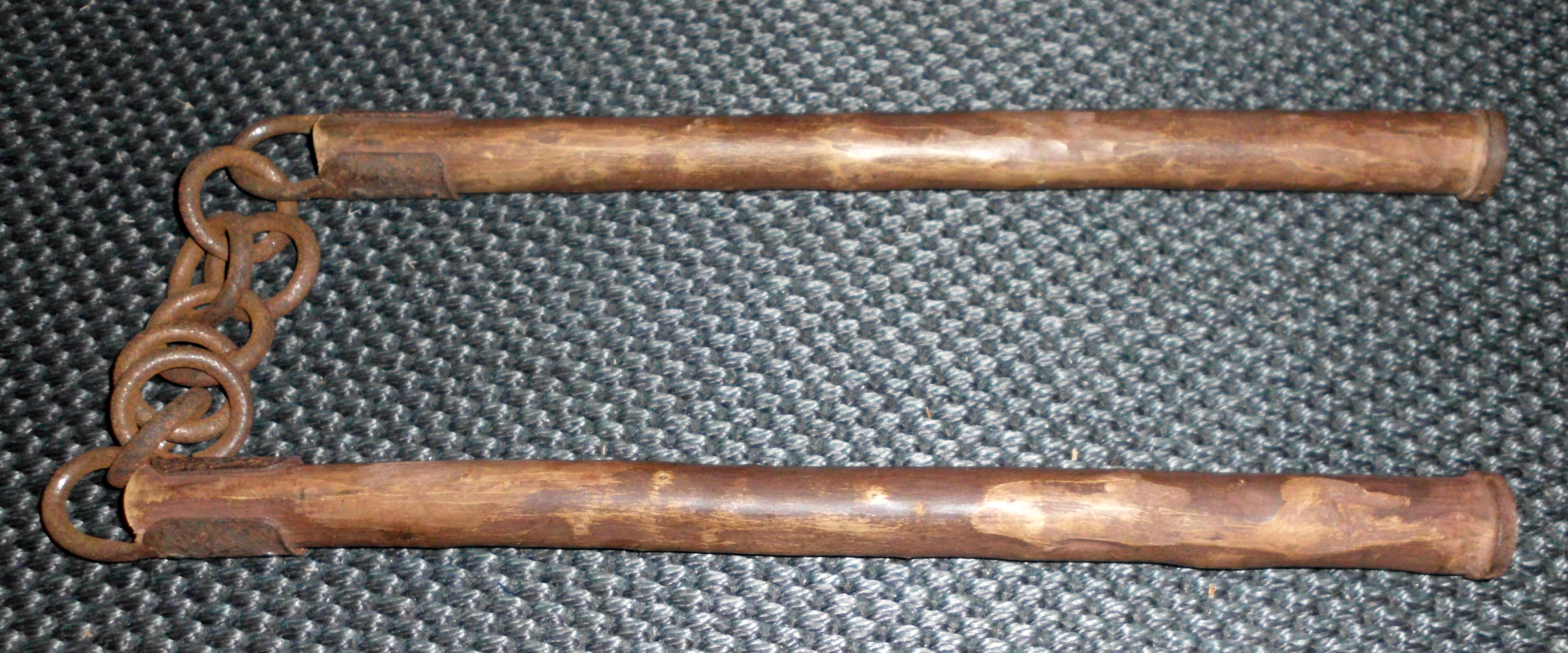
Nunchaku

A nunchaku is two sections of wood (or metal in modern incarnations) connected by a cord or chain. There is much controversy over its origins: some say it was originally a Chinese weapon, others say it evolved from a threshing flail, while one theory purports that it was developed from a horse's bit. Chinese nunchaku tend to be rounded, whereas Okinawan ones are octagonal, and they were originally linked by horse hair. There are many variations on the nunchaku, ranging from the three sectional staff (san-setsu-kon, mentioned later in this article), to smaller multi-section nunchaku. The nunchaku was popularized by Bruce Lee in a number of films, made in both Hollywood and Hong Kong. This weapon is illegal in Canada, Australia (unless a permit is held) and parts of Europe.

=== Eku ===
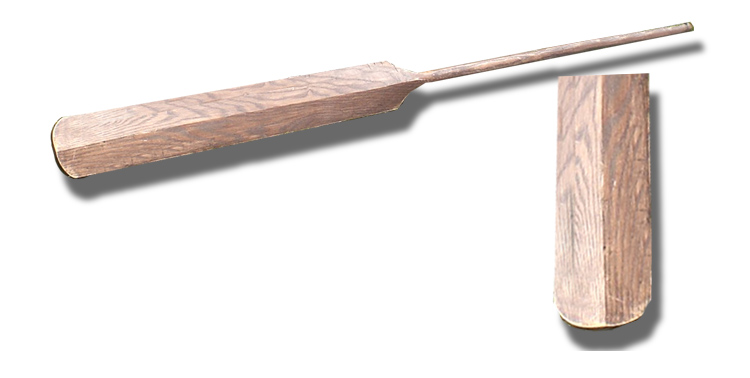
Eku

The Okinawan style of oar is called an eku (this actually refers to the local wood most commonly used for oars), eiku, iyeku, or ieku. Noteworthy hallmarks are the slight point at the tip, curve to one side of the paddle and a roof-like ridge along the other. One of the basic moves for this weapon utilizes the fact that a fisherman fighting on the beach would be able to fling sand at an opponent. While not having the length, and therefore reach, of the bō, the rather sharp edges can inflict more penetrating damage when wielded properly. Notable eku kata (forms) include:

- Tsuken Akachu No Eiku De (Also called as Chikin Akachu No Eiku De)

=== Tinbe-rochin ===
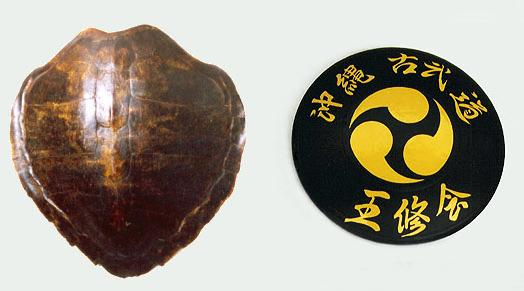
Traditional shields used in kobudō

The tinbe-rochin consists of a shield and spear. It is one of the least known Okinawan weapons. The tinbe (shield) can be made of various materials but is commonly found in vine or cane, metal, or archetypically, from a turtle shell (historically, the Ryūkyū Islands' primary source of food, fishing, provided a reliable supply of turtle shells). The shield size is generally about 45 cm long and 38 cm wide. The rochin (short spear) is cut with the length of the shaft being the same distance as the forearm to the elbow if it is being held in the hand. The spearhead then protrudes from the shaft and can be found in many differing designs varying from spears to short swords and machete-style (seiryuto) implements.

=== Sansetsukon ===
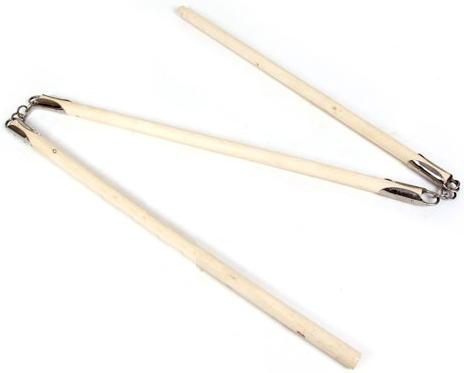
Sansetsukon

The sansetsukon is similar to a nunchaku, but has three sections of wood (or metal in modern incarnations) connected by a cord or chain.

=== Kuwa ===
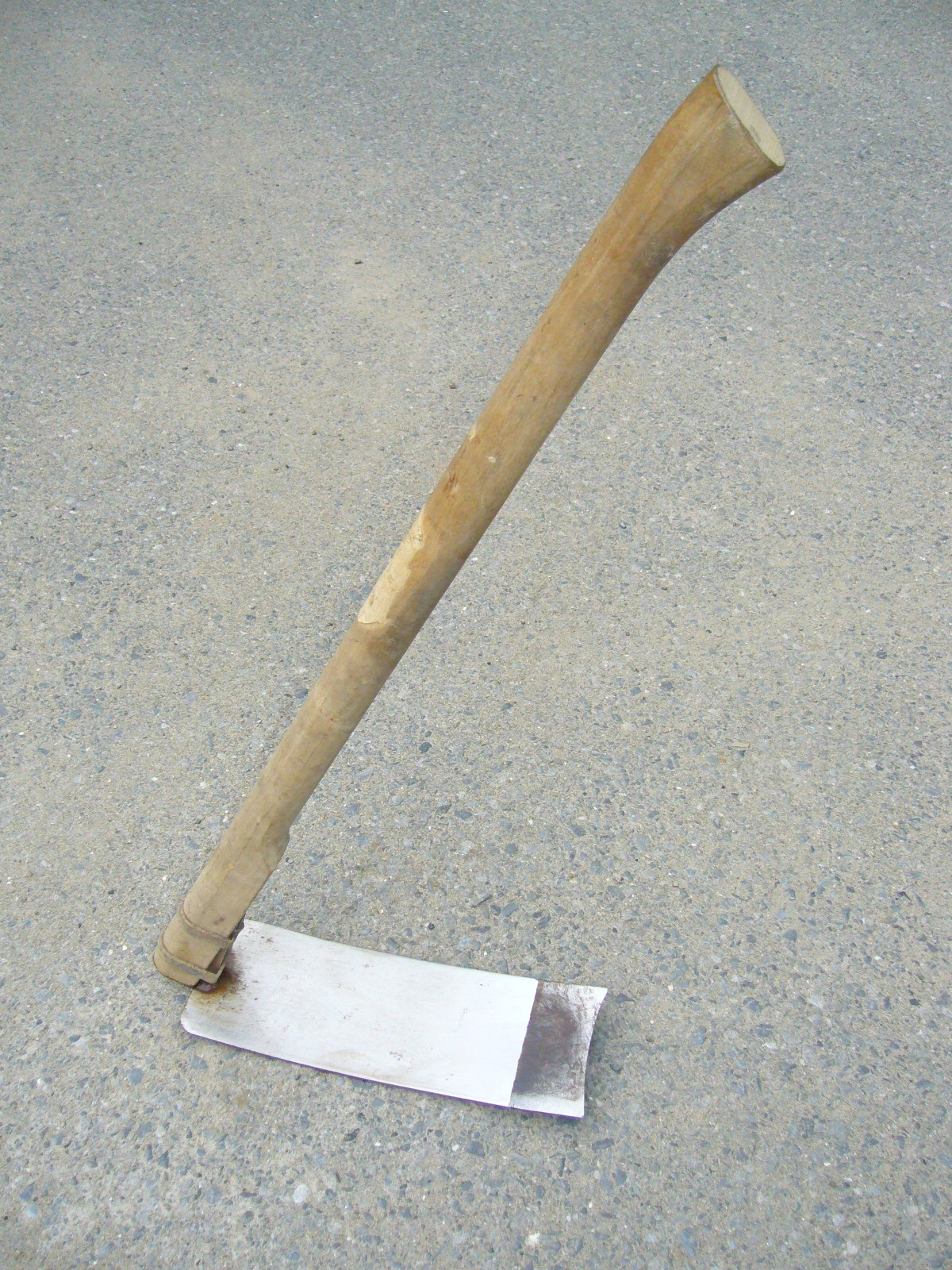
Kuwa

The hoe is common in all agrarian societies; in Okinawa, the kuwa has been also used as a weapon for as long as there have been farmers. Compared to garden-variety hoes, the handle tends to be thicker and usually shorter, both due to Okinawan stature, and the fact that much of the agriculture takes place on hillsides where long handles would be a hindrance. A classic shape of blade is a simple rectangle of steel with a sharp leading edge, but may also be forked with tines. Notable kuwa kata (forms) include:

- Kata Matayoshi No Kuwa Nu De

=== Tekko ===
Tekkō

The tekko or tecchu is a form of knuckleduster, and primarily takes its main form of usage from that of empty-hand technique, whilst also introducing slashing movements. The tekko is usually made to the width of the hand with anything between one and three protruding points on the knuckle front with protruding points at the top and the bottom of the knuckle. They can be made of any hard material but are predominantly found in aluminium, iron, steel, or wood.

=== Suruchin ===
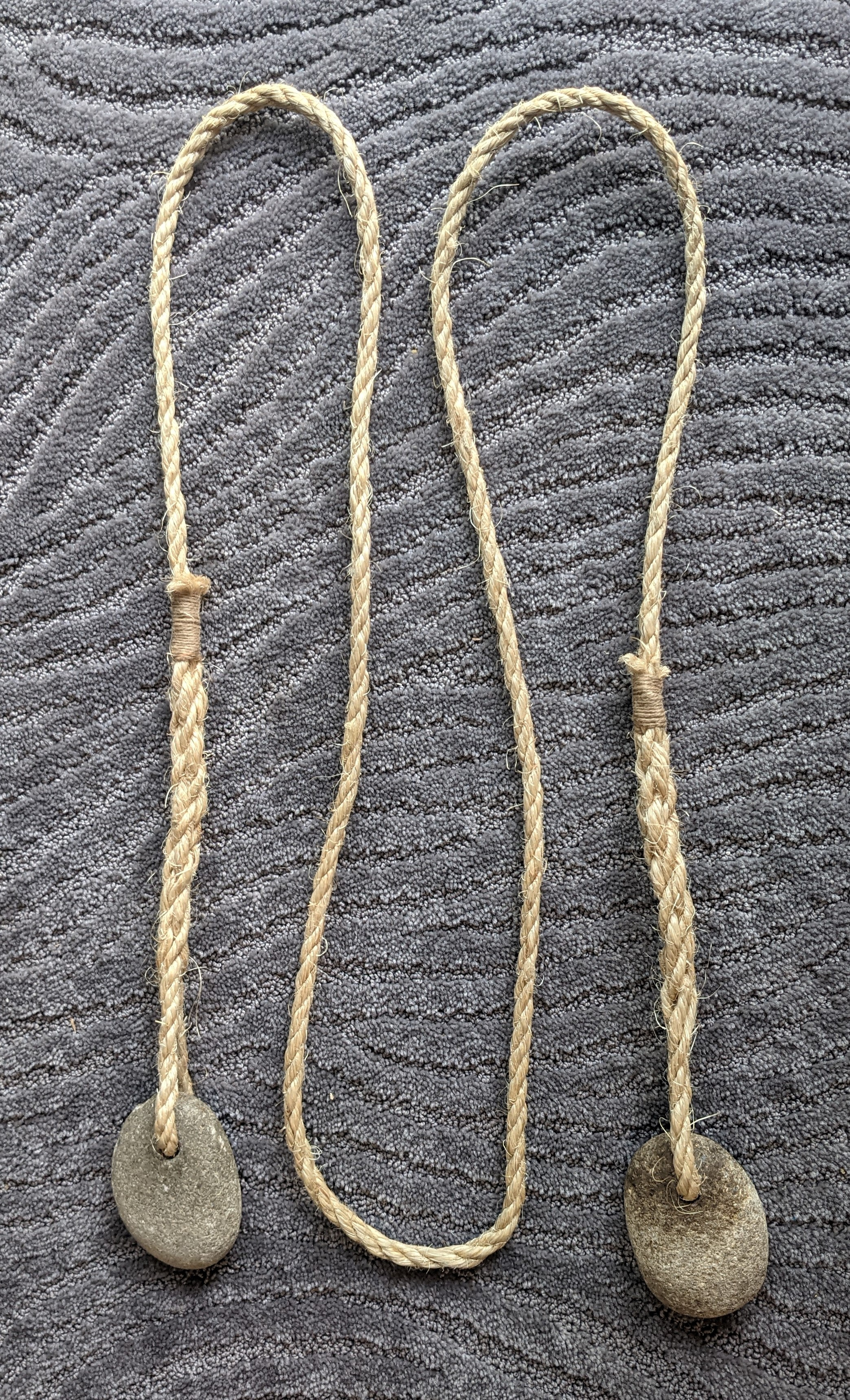
Suruchin

The suruchin consists of a weighted chain or leather cord and can be found in two kinds: 'tan suruchin' (short) and 'naga suruchin' (long). The lengths are about 150–152 cm and 230–240 cm respectively. It is a weapon which can be easily hidden prior to use, and due to this fact can be devastatingly effective. In the modern era, found with a bladed instrument at one end and a weight at the other, the surujin techniques are very similar to those of the Meteor Hammer or Rope Dart. Leather cords are used for practice or kumite, whereas chains are favored for demonstration, but rope (most commonly of hemp) was the original material used. Notable suruchin kata (froms) include:

- Nagai Kusari, Mijikai Kusari
- Matayoshi Kobudō: Suruchin no Toseki

=== Nunti Bo ===
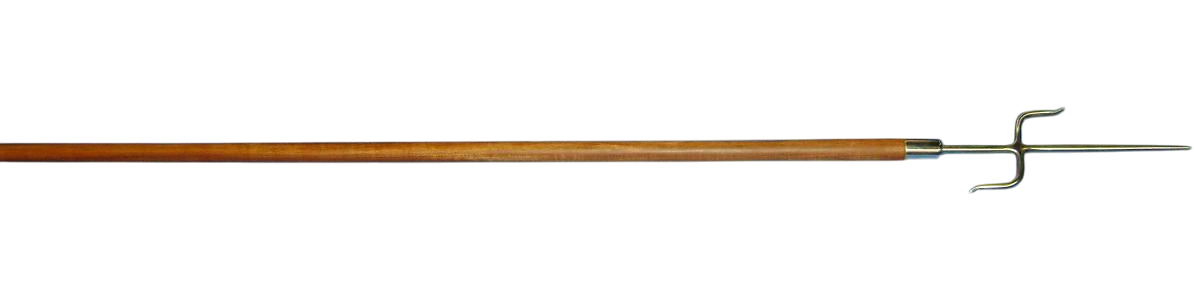
Nunti Bō

The Nunti Bō (貫手棒, lit. "Piercing-Hands Bō") is similar to a spear, but typically composed of a bo with a manji-shaped sai mounted on the end. Similar to the trident and the trishula. Notable nunti bō kata (froms) include:

- Kata Nunti Sho, Kata Nunti Dai

=== Tambo ===
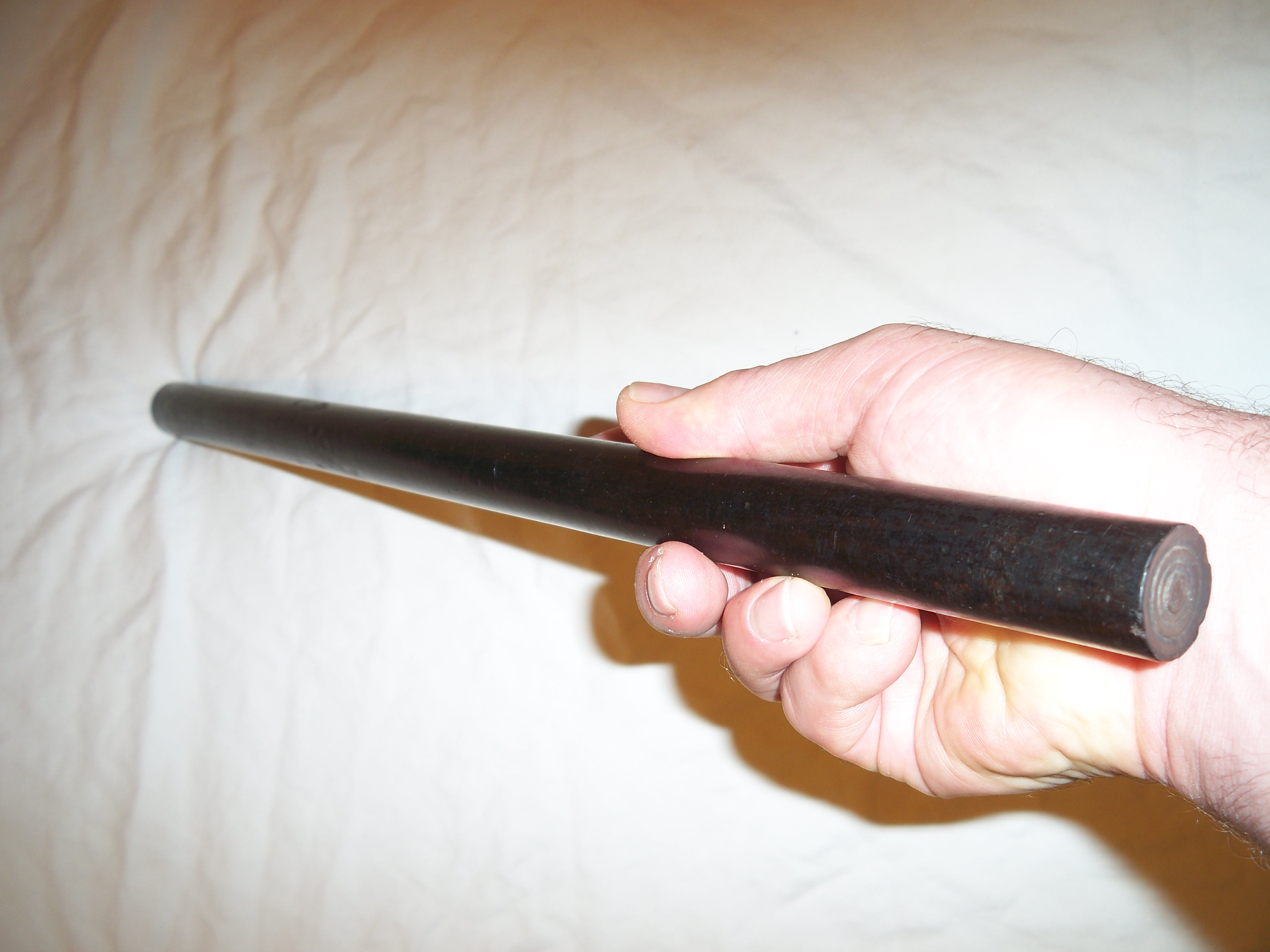
Tambō

The tambo, sometimes spelled tanbo, is a short staff (compared to a bo, or a hanbo) made of hardwood or bamboo. Its length is determined by measuring from the tip of the elbow to the wrist. Tambo can be used in pairs.

=== Hanbō ===
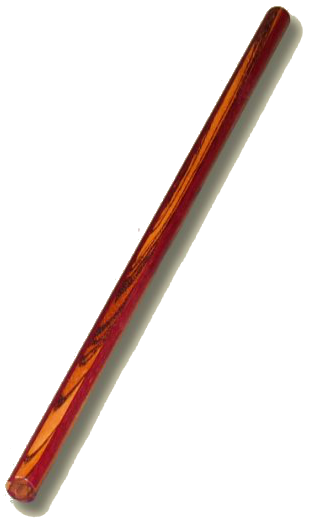
Hanbō

The hanbō is a middle length wood or bamboo stick, used for striking and joint locking techniques. It measures about 90 cm, or can be made taking into account the length from the hip to the ankle.

== Comparison of Okinawan kobudō styles ==
This table compares styles of Okinawan kobudō. The weapons practiced by each style are listed. The styles listed below may practice strictly weapons, or may practice another martial arts (usually karate) as well.

Generally, weapons systems are not automatically formalized as karate systems. Some karate systems include weapons standard in their curriculum, while others may offer weapons training optionally. Some individual schools may teach additional weapons not necessarily taught by others in their system.

Although many karate systems do not include weapons, individual schools may choose to teach Okinawan kobudō. These karate systems may or may not be listed here.

Comparison of Okinawan kobudō styles
Style	Primary martial art	Origin	Required	Weapons														
Style	Primary martial art	Origin	Required	Bo	Sai	Tonfa	Kama	Nunchaku	Eku	Tinbe-Rochin	Sansetsukon	Nunti	Kuwa	Tekko	Yari	Suruchin	Nunti Bo	Tichu
Chitō-ryū	Karate	Japan and Okinawa, Taishō period (1912-1926)	?	Yes	Yes	Yes	Yes	Yes						Yes				
Keichu-ryū	Karate	United States, ?	?	Yes	Yes	Yes	Yes		Yes									
Isshin-ryū	Karate	Okinawa, period (1952-1956)	Yes	Yes	Yes	Yes												
Matayoshi	Okinawan kobudo	Okinawa, Taishō period (1912-1926)	?	Yes	Yes	Yes	Yes	Yes	Yes	Yes	Yes	Yes	Yes	Yes		Yes	Yes	
Ryūei-ryū	Karate	Okinawa, Taishō period (1912-1926)	Yes	Yes	Yes	Yes	Yes	Yes	Yes	Yes		Yes			Yes	Yes		
Motobu-ryū	Karate	Okinawa, Taishō period (1912-1926)	?	Yes	Yes	Yes	Yes	Yes	Yes	Yes					Yes			
Ryūkyū	Okinawan kobudo	Okinawa, Taishō period (1912-1926)	?	Yes	Yes	Yes	Yes	Yes	Yes	Yes	Yes			Yes		Yes		
Shōrin-ryū	Karate	Okinawa, Taishō period (1912-1926)	Yes	Yes	Yes	Yes	Yes	Yes	Yes				Yes	Yes				
Shuri-ryū	Karate	Okinawa, Taishō period (1912-1926)	?	Yes	Yes	Yes	Yes	Yes	Yes									
Tokushinryu	Okinawan kobudo	Okinawa, Taishō period (1912-1926)	?	Yes	Yes	Yes	Yes	Yes	Yes	Yes	Yes	Yes		Yes	Yes		Yes	Yes
Yamanni ryu	Okinawan kobudo	Okinawa, Taishō period (1912-1926)	?	Yes	Yes	Yes	Yes	Yes	Yes									
Yoshukai Karate	Karate	Japan and Okinawa, Taishō period (1912-1926)	Yes	Yes	Yes	Yes		Yes										
Meibukan Goju-ryū Gojukai	Karate	Okinawa	Yes	Yes	Yes													
Ufuchiku Kobudo (Ryukyu Dento Kobujutsu Hozon Budo Kyokai)	Okinawan kobudō	Okinawa	Yes	Yes	Yes	Yes	Yes	Yes	Yes	Yes	Yes	Yes	Yes	Yes	Yes	Yes	Yes	Yes
Shorei Goju Ryu	Karate	Okinawa	No	Yes	Yes	Yes	Yes	Yes	Yes	No								
Seiyo Shorin-ryū	Karate	Okinawa	Yes	Yes	Yes	Yes	Yes	Yes	Yes	No	Yes	Yes	Yes	Yes	Yes	Yes	Yes	Yes
Matsubayashi-ryū	Karate	Okinawa	Yes	Yes	Yes	Yes	Yes							Yes				

== See also ==
- Karate
- Matayoshi Kobudo
- Pechin/Peichin
- Ryukyu Kobudo
- Yamanni ryu
- Ufuchiku Kobudo
