= Ufuchiku Kobudo =

Form of Okinawan martial arts

Ufuchiku-Ryu
- Also known as: Ufuchiku-Den
- Focus: Okinawan kobudō
- Country of origin: Okinawa, Ryukyu Kingdom
- Creator: Kanagusuku Sanda Ufuchiku
- Famous practitioners: Shosei Kina, Saburo Tokashiki, Masanobu Kina, Kaishu Isa, Kiichi Nakamoto, Shin'yei Kyan

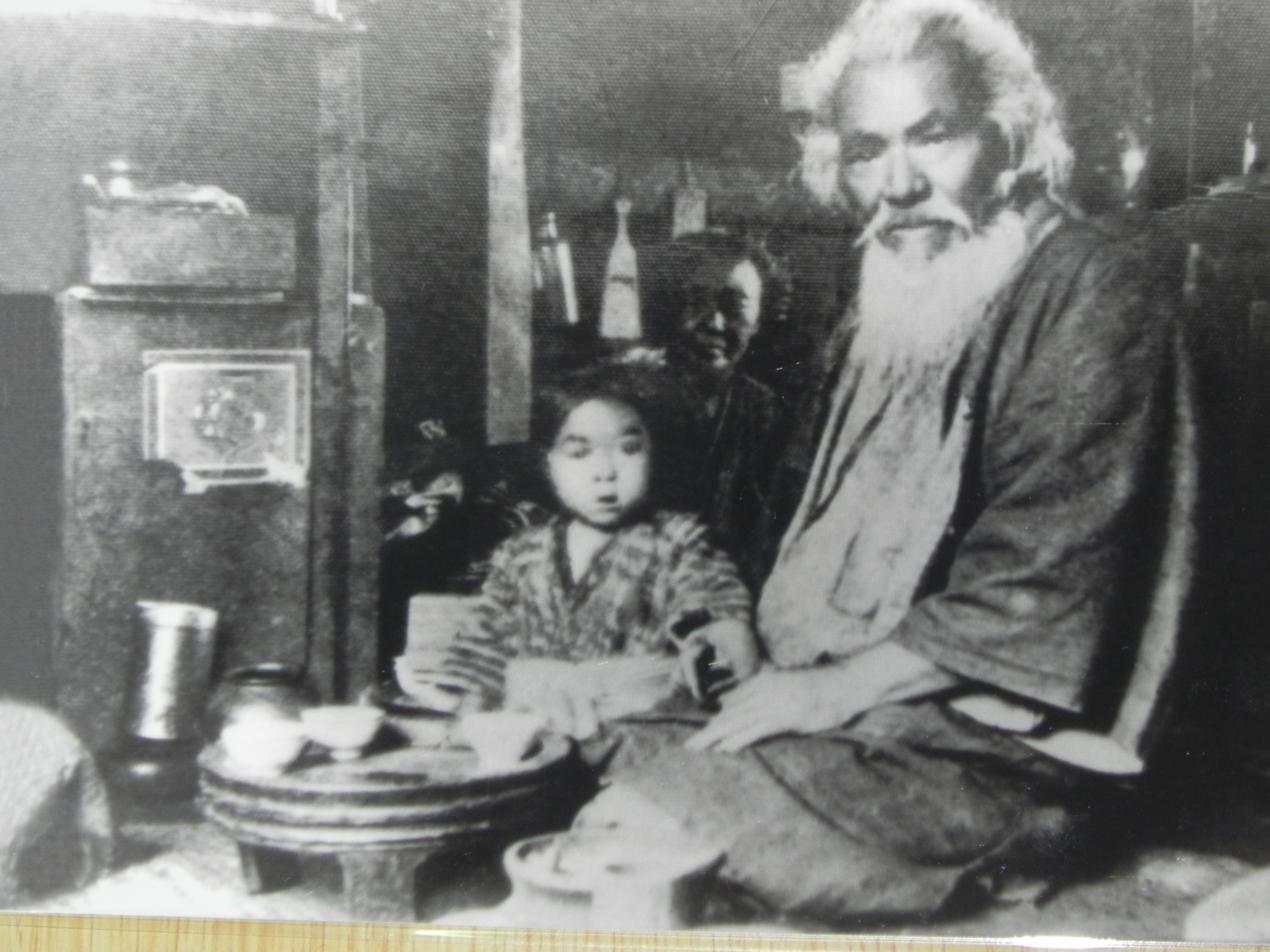
Kanagusuku (2)

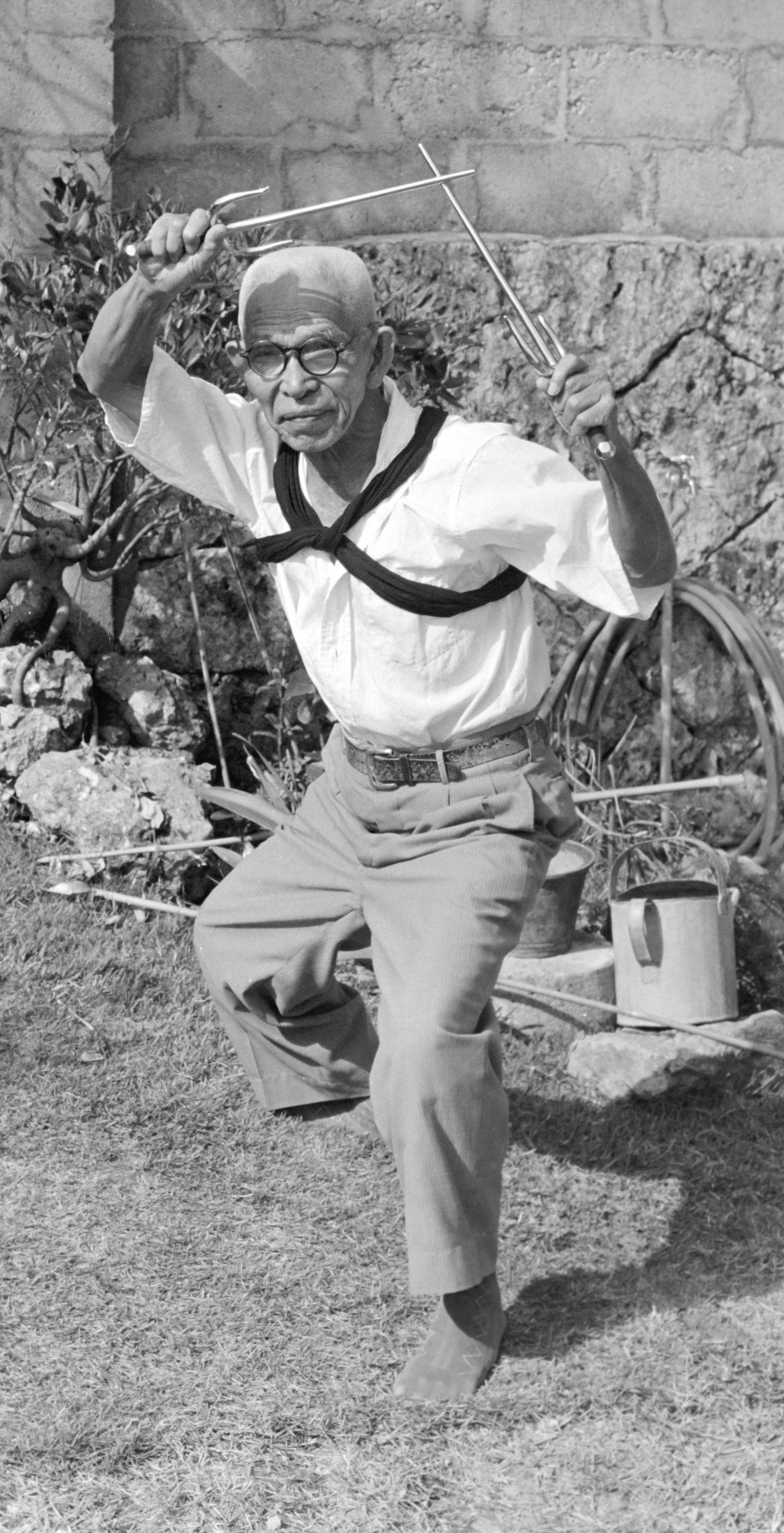
Kina Shosei 1961

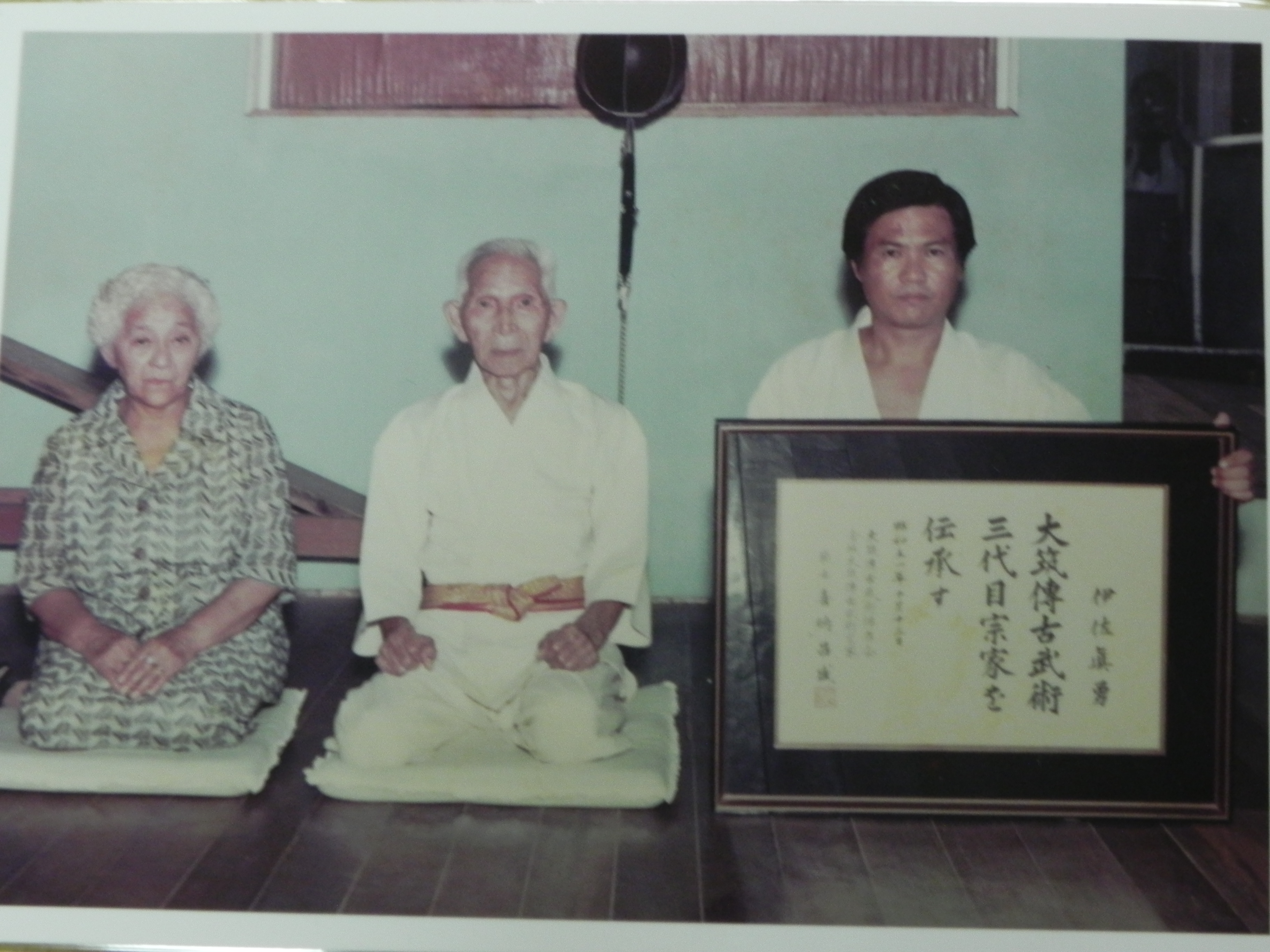
Isa Kaishu sokeship with Iha Kiyo and Kina Shosei

Ufuchiku kobudo (大筑古武術) sometimes referred to as ufuchiku kobujutsu or ufuchiku-den is a form of Okinawan kobudō. In this form, the main weapon is the sai, and other weapons such as bō, eku, tuifa (or tonfa), nunchaku, tekko, teko, techu, nuntesu, kama, gusan, sanjakubo, kusarigama, nawa, uchibo, surujin, kyushakubo, nuntesu bo, jingasa, renkuwan, sansetsukun, naginata, tessen, and tanbo are studied as secondary weapons.

== History ==
Ufuchiku Kobudo was founded by an Okinawan named Kanagusuku Sanda (1841–1921), or in Japanese, Kinjo Sanda. He was a police commissioner (ufuchiku) by trade, hence the name of the style. Although his actual teachers are unknown, he did hint to have studied some under Ishimine Peichin, although not confirmed. He also acquired much of his weapons knowledge on the streets of Okinawa dealing with criminals. He served as a guard to the last Okinawan king, Sho Tai, and he accompanied him to Edo as part of the Ryukyu entourage and serving as the overseer of the royal horses. Kanagusuku Ufuchiku has several students including Gibo Kamado, Gusukuma Rio, Kanagusuku Shinko, Tokashiki Saburo, Yabiku Moden, Hisataka Kori, and Shosei Kina just to name the known ones. This is a rare system and rarely taught even in Okinawa.

== Lineage ==
Upon Kanagusuku Ufuchiku's death, Shosei Kina (1882–1981) became the second generation Soke or head master, even though he was the youngest and most junior of all the students. Kina first learned saijutsu from men in his village as a teen in Shimabuku,, excelling in Tsuken Shitahaku no Sai and Chatan Yara no Sai, but he began his training in ufuchiku kanagusuku in 1906, wherein he furthered his understandinog of use of the sai and jo/gusan and was exposed to the twenty-five weapons of Kanagsuku's kobujutsu. Shosei Kina Okinawan students consisted of Shinyei Kyan, Shoshin Kina, Masanobu Kina, Kantoku Izumikawa, Seishin Higa, Kaishu Isa and Kiichi Nakamoto among others. Kina became a member of the Okinawa Kobudo Kyokai in 1961 and its continuation as the Okinawa Karate Kobudo Rengokai in 1968 from which he was awarded the 10th Dan Rank. In October 1975, Kina Sensei founded the Ufuchiku-den Ryūkyū Kobujutsu Hozonkai and served as its first President with Kaishu Isa assigned as the Vice-President.

== Ryukyu Dento Kobujutsu Hozon Budo Kyokai ==
Shinyei Kyan was the senior karate and saijutsu student of Shosei Kina; having started his training at the age of 10 in 1922. He was highly involved with participating in the Okinawa Kobudo Kyokai (later known as the Zen Okinawa Karate and Kobudo Rengokai) with Kina Sensei, attending meetings and performing at demonstrations together in the 1960s. Kyan Sensei learned his bojutsu from Kanki Izumikawa and Oshiro Chojo of Yamanni-ryu in the late 1920s. As everyone knows he was also an early member of the Matsubayashi dojo of Nagamine Shoshin, passing his Saijutsu and bojutsu down to the dojo members. Kyan Sensei began a very prestigious career in politics in the late 1960s through the 1980’s (he had previously been an educator). Following his retirement from national politics in the late 1980s, he again was able to take up more time with his passion of karate and kobudo. In January 1993, he was awarded the title and rank of Hanshi 9th Dan by the Okinawa Dento Kobudo Hozonkai (which was led by Nakamoto Masahiro Sensei), and the following year on July 28, 1994, he formed his own kobudo organization, the Ryukyu Dento Kobujutsu Budo Hozon Budo Kyokai in order to pass on his own kobudo consisting of Yamanni-ryu bojutsu, Ufuchiku Saijutu, and other weapons from various teachers. Following his death on July 16, 1997, Nakamoto Kiichi, who had also been a Saijutsu student of Kina Shosei in the 1970’s and then Kyan Sensei, was named as the 2nd President of the organization on October 28, 1997. Nakamoto Sensei founded a dojo, the Okinawakan, to preserve Kyan’s kobudo alongside other kobudo he has learned from other sources over the years and well as his Goju-ryu which he learned directly from Chojun Miyagi and later Eichii Miyazato. Nakamoto's kobudo being taught is also now being called Ufuchiku Kobudo as recognition to Kyan's and Nakamoto's time with Shosei Kina. Nakamoto Sensei had received his 10th dan from Shinyei Kyan before Kyan Sensei passed away. Nakamoto runs the association out of his dojo the Okinawakan, which is headquartered in Okinawa City, Okinawa.

== Ufuchiku-den Ryūkyū Kobujutsu Hozonkai ==
Isa Kaishu began his training under Shosei Kina in karate in August 1952 alongside his older sempai. At the age of 19 in 1962, Shosei Kina offered to take Isa Sensei to train under his sempai and more experienced practitioner of Sanda Kanagusuku, Saburo Tokashiki (1877-1967) who was considered a recluse. Kanagusuku's grand-daughter, Kiyo Iha, told Mark Bishop, whose mother-in-law was Iha's closest friend, that she remembers Tokashiki as a senior student of Kanagusuku visiting her grandfather's home and recounted the story of Tokashiki's training being so intense that Kanagusuku accidentally cut open his face during training to avoid Tokashiki's advances. Isa Sensei became Tokashiki's student and trained with him until his death in 1967, learning more details of the total system of Kanagusuku's bukijutsu containing the 25 weapons that Shosei Kina mentioned in his interview and karamiti. In May 1971, Shosei Kina presented Isa Sensei a menkyo kaiden of full proficiency and listing all the weapons of Kanagusuku Kasshin Ryukyu Kobujutsu system. In October 1976, a ceremony was held at the Epicopal church where Shosei Kina attended church and Masanobu Kina taught a karate class with many attendants including Kiyo Iha representing the Kanagusuku family, and Shosei Kina presented Kaishu Isa with a certificate of Sokeship, making him the 3rd soke of Ufuchiku-Den Ryukyu Kobujutsu. In January 1981, just prior to his death Kina Sensei passed his Ufuchiku-Den ryukyu Kobujutsu Hozon Kai organization to Shosei Kina in a formal ceremony, making Isa Sensei the 2nd president. The current vice president of the organization is Masahiro Kinjo, who has trained under Isa Sensei for over 30 years. Isa is a Buddhist priest by profession and spends a great deal of time with his official duties, however he does teach out of his dojo called the Shōrin-ryū Karate Kobudō Shūdōkan located in Okinawa. Isa Sensei's Kobujutsu students include Moriatsu Tamai, Masahiro Kinjo and Walt Young. In November 2023, Walt Young was awarded a Shibu menjyo to open a branch of the Hozon Kai in Virginia, USA.

== Rengeikan Dojo ==
Another of Shosei Kina's senior students was his nephew, Masanobu Kina (1929–1975), who founded his own dojo, the Rengeikan. Masanobu Kina trained Itsou/Yabu-ha Shorin-ryu karate and Ufuchiku-kobujutsu saijutsu under his uncle; in his youth Shorinji-ryu karate under Chotoku Kyan who was a friend of his grandfather; kamajutsu with Matsutaro Ire Sensei; and bojutsu, sai, nunchaku, and tonfa from men in his village growing up. However, his students referred to his kobudo collectively as Ufuchiku kobudo. Masanobu Kina had several foreign students such as Robert Teller, Ron Nix and Anthony Marquez who trained with him in Okinawa in the late 1970's/early 1980's before his unfortunate drowning. Kina Masanobu Sensei’s kobudo included Kuwae no Kun (also known as Tsui Sashi Ume no Kun), Shirotaru no Kun, Shishi no Kun, Kina no Sai, Ufuchiku no Sai (Kina Shosei Sai I), Soken no Sai, Kina no Tonfa, Kina no Nunchaku, Goshin Kama no Te, and Kobo Kama no Te.
