= Japanese destroyer Kuwa =

Two Japanese destroyers have been named Kuwa (桑, ”morus”):

- Japanese destroyer Kuwa (1918), an Enoki-class destroyer of the Imperial Japanese Navy launched in 1918 and sold in 1932
- Japanese destroyer Kuwa (1944), a Matsu-class destroyer of the Imperial Japanese Navy launched in May 1944 and sunk in December 1944

== See also ==
- Kuwa (disambiguation)
