= Nunchaku =

Traditional East Asian weapon

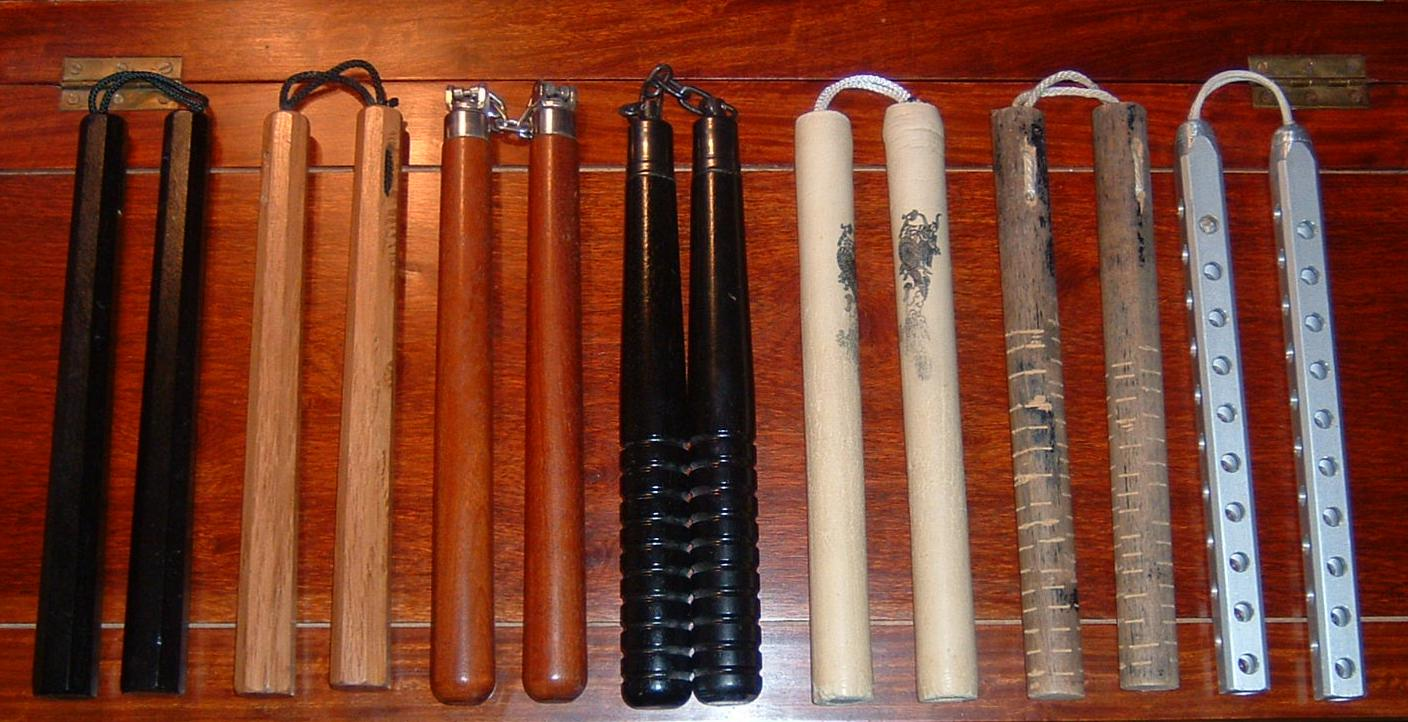
- Various types of nunchaku.

Chinese name
- Traditional Chinese: 雙節棍
- Simplified Chinese: 双节棍
Transcriptions
Standard Mandarin
- Hanyu Pinyin: Shuāngjiégùn
Yue: Cantonese
- Jyutping: soeng1 zit3 gwan3

Alternative Chinese name
- Traditional Chinese: 雙截棍
- Simplified Chinese: 双截棍
Transcriptions
Standard Mandarin
- Hanyu Pinyin: Shuāngjiégùn

Second alternative Chinese name
- Traditional Chinese: 兩節棍
Transcriptions
Hakka
- Romanization: nng chat kun

Japanese name
- Katakana: ヌンチャク
Transcriptions
- Romanization: nunchaku

The nunchaku (/nʌnˈtʃækuː/, US: /nənˈtʃɑːkuː/) (Japanese: ヌンチャク); (Chinese 双节棍, Shuāngjiégùn), also referred to as dual-section stick, nunchuks (/ˈnʌntʃʌks/), nunchucks, chainsticks, or chuka sticks in English, is a traditional East-Asian martial arts weapon consisting of two sticks (traditionally made of wood), connected to each other at their ends by a short metal chain or a rope. The sticks are approximately 30 cm or 12 inches long, and the rope 7.6 cm or 3 inches long. A person who has practiced using this weapon is referred to in Japanese as nunchakuka (ヌンチャク家, nunchakuka).

The nunchaku is most widely used in Southern Chinese kung fu, Okinawan kobudo and karate. It is intended to be used as a training weapon, because practicing with it enables the development of quick hand movements and improves posture.

Modern nunchaku may be made of metal, plastic, or fiberglass rather than the traditional wood. Toy versions and replicas, not intended to be used as weapons, may be made of polystyrene foam or plastic. Possession of this weapon is illegal in some countries, except for use in professional martial arts schools.

The origin of the nunchaku is unclear. One traditional explanation holds that it was originally invented by Chinese Emperor Taizu of Song as a weapon of war, initially named Grand Ancestor Coiling Dragon Staff (大小盤龍棍/太祖盤龍棍, daai6 saai3 pun4 lung4 gwan3/taai3 zo2 pun4 lung4 gwan3). Another weapon, called the tabak-toyok, native to the northern Philippines, is constructed very similarly, suggesting that it and the nunchaku are descended from the same instrument.

In modern times, the nunchaku and the tabak-toyok were popularized by the actor and martial artist Bruce Lee, and by Dan Inosanto. Lee famously used nunchaku in several scenes in the 1972 film Fist of Fury. When Tadashi Yamashita worked with Lee on the 1973 film Enter the Dragon, he enabled Lee to further explore the use of the nunchaku and other kobudo disciplines. The nunchaku is also the signature weapon of the character Michelangelo, one of the Teenage Mutant Ninja Turtles.

== Etymology ==
The Ryukyuan word nunchaku (ヌンチャク) likely originated from the Min Chinese word of "nng chat kun" (兩節棍), literally "double-section stick" or "two-section stick." Another name for this weapon is "nūchiku" (ヌウチク).

In the English language, nunchaku are often referred to as "nunchucks". It is a variant of a word from the Okinawan language, which itself may come from a Min Chinese word for a farming tool, neng-cak. Other terms In English include dual-section stick, nunchuks (/ˈnʌntʃʌks/), nunchucks, chainsticks, or chuka sticks.

== Origins ==
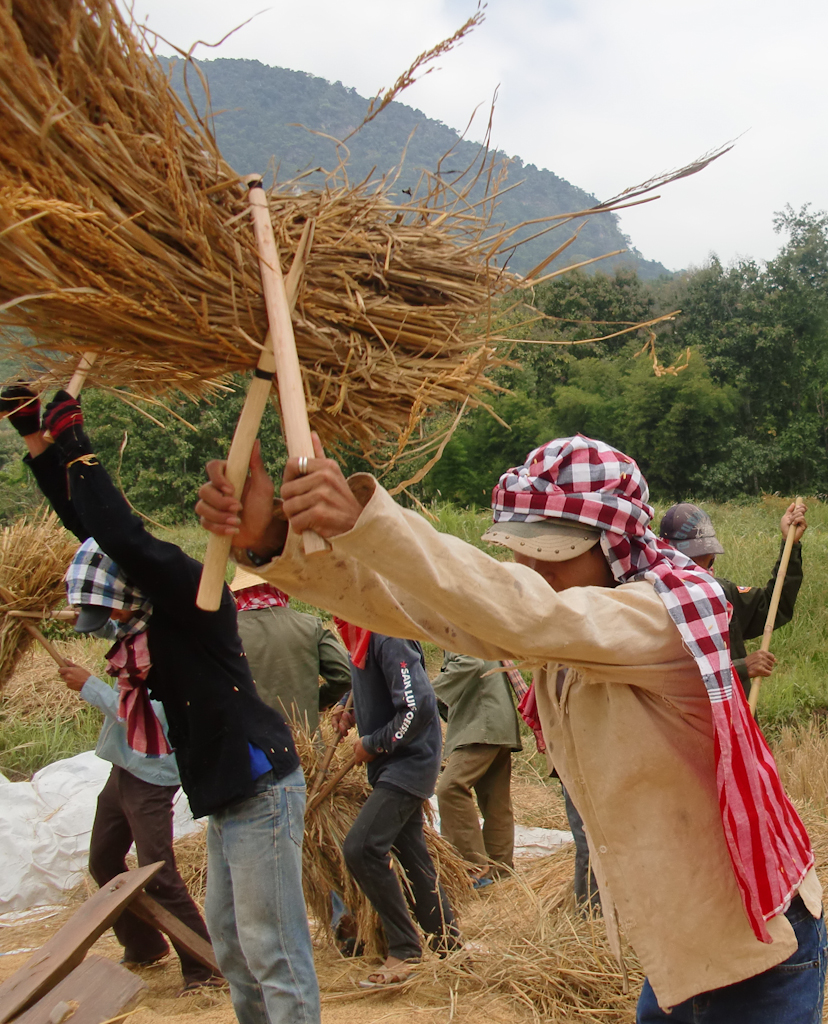
A South-East Asian rice threshing tool similar in design to nunchaku.

The first written record of nunchaku-like weapon was the Chinese military compendium of 武經總要; Wujing Zongyao compiled during the Northern Song dynasty:

"鐵鏈夾棒，本出西戎，馬上用之，以敵漢之步兵。其狀如農家打麥之枷，以鐵飾之，利於自上擊下，故漢兵善用者巧於戎人。"

Translation:

"Two sticks connected by metal chain, originated from Xirong, used on horses in combat against Han infantry, shaped similarly to flails used by farmers to thresh wheat, iron-decorated, easy to strike below from above, Han soldiers who were able to master could exercise with excellence against the Xirongs."

One popular belief is that nunchaku in its contemporary form was originally a short South-East Asian flail. A near variant to the nunchaku called tabak-toyok exists in the northern Philippines, which was used to thresh rice or soybeans. Alternative theories are that it was originally developed from an Okinawan horse bit (muge) or from a wooden clapper called hyoshiki carried by the village night watch, made of two blocks of wood joined by a cord. The night watch would hit the blocks of wood together to attract people's attention, then warn them about fires and other dangers.

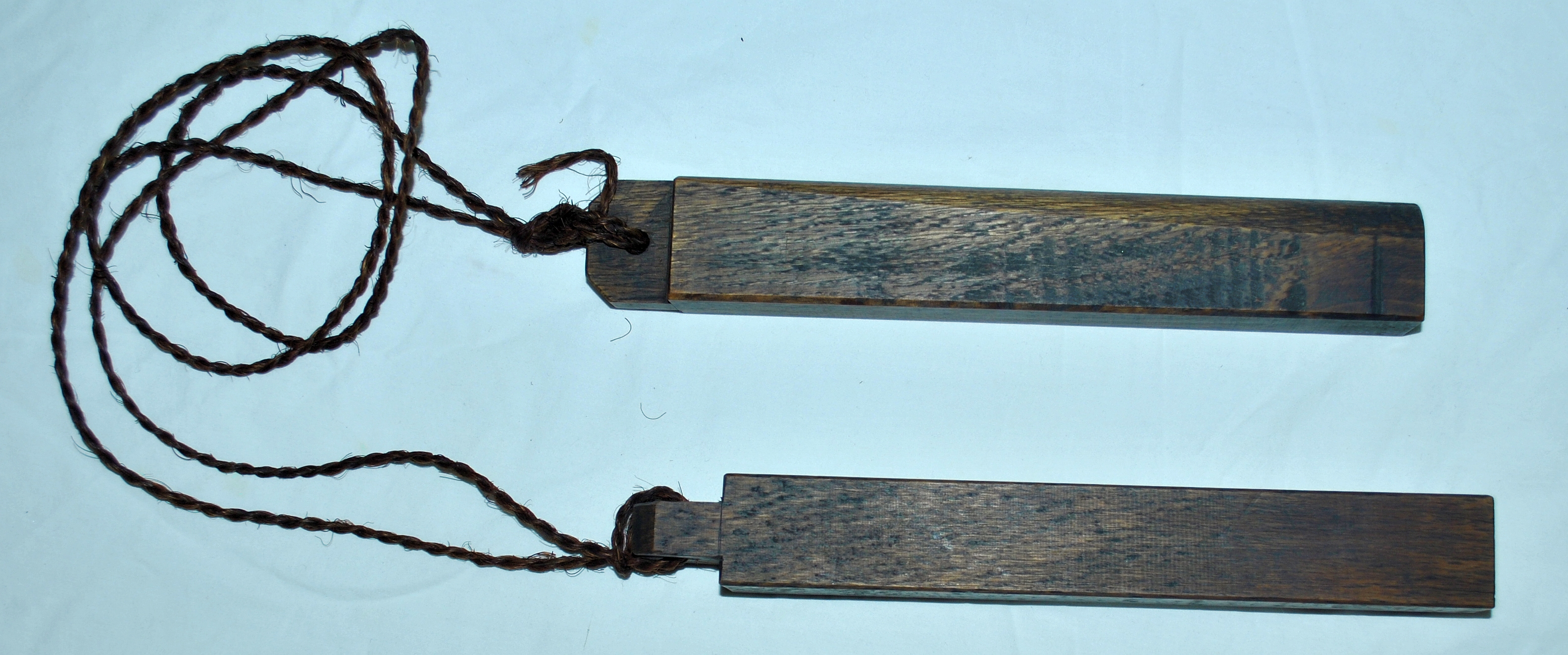
Hyoshiki (wooden clappers)

An oft-repeated claim is that the nunchaku and other Okinawan weapons were tools adapted for use as weapons by peasants who were forbidden from possessing conventional weapons, but available academic sources suggest this is likely a romantic exaggeration created by 20th century martial arts schools. Martial arts in Okinawa were practiced exclusively by the aristocracy (kazoku) and "serving nobles" (shizoku), but were prohibited among commoners (heimin).

== Parts ==
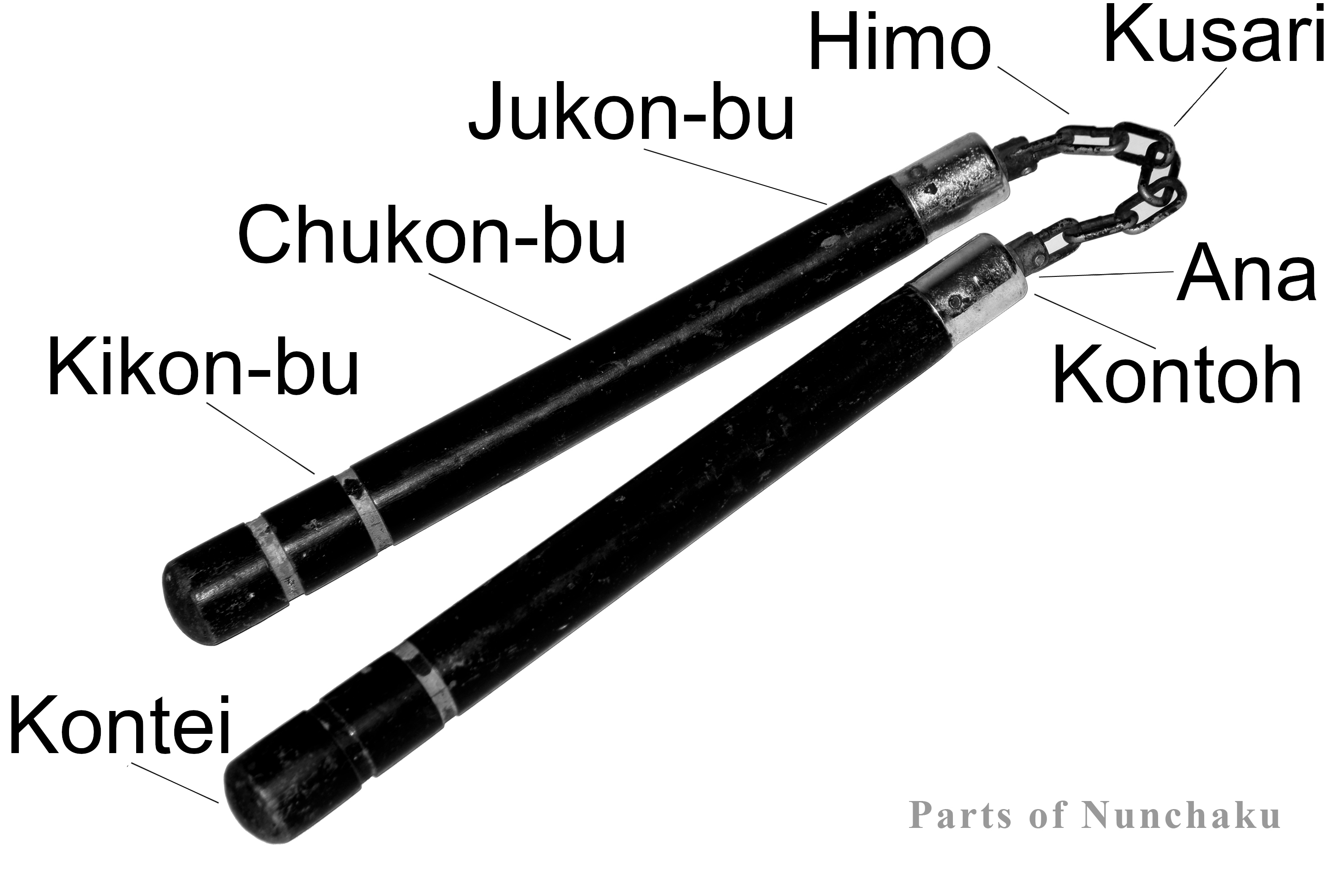
Parts of nunchaku

In Japanese,

- Ana 穴: the hole on the kontoh of each handle for the himo to pass through—only nunchaku that are connected by himo have an ana.
- Himo 紐: the rope, which connects the two handles of some nunchaku.
- Kusari 鎖: the chain, which connects the two handles of some nunchaku.
- Kontoh: the top of each handle.
- Jukon-bu: the upper area of the handle.
- Chukon-bu: the center part of the handle.
- Kikon-bu: the lower part of the handle.
- Kontei: the bottom of the handle.

== Construction ==
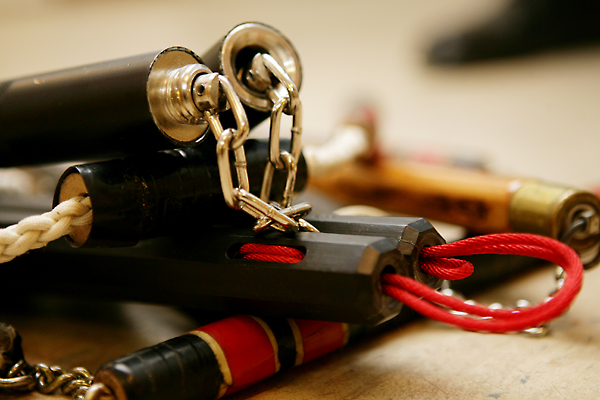
Close-up image of the kontoh (top) of two nunchaku, showing the kusari (chain) on one, and the himo (rope) and ana (hole) that the himo goes through on the other.

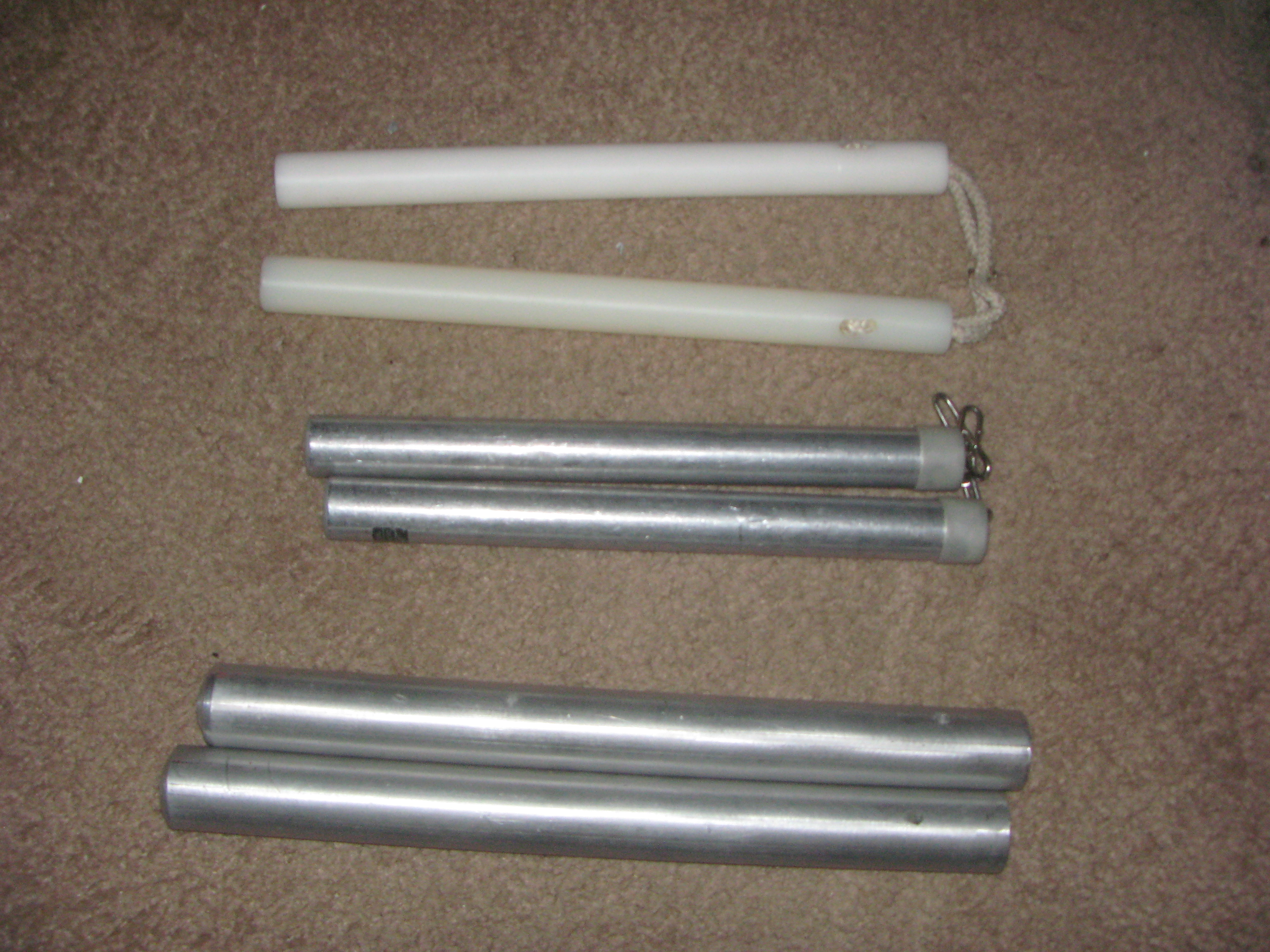
Uncommon nunchuks made of solid nylon, hollow aluminum, and solid metal (unlinked)

Nunchaku consist of two sections of wood connected by a cord or chain, though variants may include additional sections of wood and chain. In China, the striking stick is called "dragon stick" ("龍棍"), while the handle is called "yang stick" ("陽棍").

The rounded nunchaku is comparatively heavy and used for training, whereas the octagonal nunchaku is used for combat. Ideally, each piece should be long enough to protect the forearm when held in a high grip near the top of the shaft. Both ends are usually of equal length, although asymmetrical nunchaku exist that are closer to a traditional flail.

The ideal length of the connecting rope or chain is just long enough to allow the user to lay it over his or her palm, with the sticks hanging comfortably and perpendicular to the ground. The weapon should be properly balanced in terms of weight. Cheaper or gimmicky nunchaku (such as glow-in-the-dark versions) are often not properly balanced, which prevents the performer from performing the more advanced and flashier "low-grip" moves, such as overhand twirls. The weight should be balanced towards the outer edges of the sticks for maximum ease and control of the swing arcs.

Traditional nunchaku are made from a strong, flexible hardwood such as oak, loquat or pasania.

== Formal styles ==
The nunchaku is most commonly used in Okinawan kobudō and karate, but it is also used in Korean hapkido and Filipino eskrima. (More accurately, the Tabak-Toyok, a similar though distinct Philippine weapon, is used, not the Okinawan nunchaku). Its application is different in each style. The traditional Okinawan forms use the sticks primarily to grip and lock. Filipino martial artists use it much the same way they would wield a stick: striking is given precedence. Korean systems combine offensive and defensive moves, so both locks and strikes are taught. Other proprietary systems of Nunchaku are also used in Sembkalah (Iranian Monolingual Combat Style), which makes lethal blows in defense and assault.

The Nunchaku is usually wielded in one hand, but it can also be dual wielded. It can be whirled around, using its hardened handles for blunt force, as well as wrapping its chain around an attacking weapon to immobilize or disarm an opponent. Nunchaku training has been said to increase hand speed, improve posture, and to condition the hands of the practitioner. Therefore, it makes a useful training weapon.

== Freestyle ==
Freestyle nunchaku is a modern style of performance art using nunchaku as a visual tool, rather than as a weapon. With the growing prevalence of the Internet, the availability of nunchaku has greatly increased. In combination with the popularity of other video sharing sites, many people have become interested in learning how to use the weapons for freestyle displays. Freestyle is one discipline of competition held by the World Nunchaku Association. Some modern martial arts teach the use of nunchaku, as it may help students improve their reflexes, hand control, and other skills.

== Legality ==
In a number of countries, possession of nunchaku is legally restricted, ranging from prohibiting carrying them concealed in public to outright banning any form of possession. Nearly all such regulations were created in the 1970s after a wave of popularity attributed to their appearance in the Bruce Lee martial arts films and related media. This popularity led to them being commonly found in the possession of delinquent youths and petty criminals. This combination of popular media exposure creating the impression of danger and lethality, and their perceived popularity with undesirable classes of society, led to legal restrictions being passed. Later legal challenges led to closer examination of nunchaku's actual use in criminal behavior, and have found that most of these laws were likely not warranted. For example Judge Pamela Chan in 2018's Maloney v. Singas concluded "there is virtually no evidence that nunchakus are associated with, or have been used to engage in, criminal conduct."

In Australia, a state or territory approval in a B709B form is required to lawfully import any nunchaku made of hard materials. They are classified as prohibited weapons in New South Wales.

Norway, Canada, Russia, Poland, and Spain are all known to have significant restrictions.

In Germany, nunchaku have been illegal since April 2006, when they were declared a strangling weapon.

In England and Wales, public possession of nunchaku is heavily restricted by the Prevention of Crime Act 1953 and the Criminal Justice Act 1988. However, nunchaku are not included in the list of weapons whose sale and manufacture is prohibited by Schedule 1 of the Criminal Justice Act 1988 (Offensive Weapons) Order 1988 and are traded openly (subject to age restrictions).

In Scotland, laws restricting offensive weapons are similar to those of England and Wales. However, in a case in 2010, Glasgow Sheriff Court refused to accept a defence submission that nunchaku were not explicitly prohibited weapons under Scottish law, although the defendants were acquitted on other grounds.

The use of nunchaku was, in the 1980s and 1990s, censored from UK rebroadcasts of American children's TV shows such as ThunderCats and Teenage Mutant Ninja Turtles cartoons and films. The UK version of ThunderCats edited out nunchaku used by the character Panthro. Teenage Mutant Ninja Turtles needed to be edited, the nunchaku used by Michelangelo were edited, until they were replaced by a grappling hook. The UK version of the video game Soul Blade was also edited, replacing the character Li Long's nunchaku with a three-sectioned staff.

In Hong Kong, it is illegal to possess metal or wooden nunchaku connected by a chain, though one can obtain a license from the police as a martial arts instructor, and rubber nunchaku are still allowed. Possession of nunchaku in mainland China is legal.

In the United States, regulations on nunchaku vary by state as well as county and city jurisdictions. Some states do not apply any restrictions, while other state laws and local ordinances continue to prohibit carrying nunchaku in specific situations, such as on school grounds or in government facilities, or if carrying in public as a concealed weapon. Broader prohibitions were passed in the 1970s for the reasons outlined above, but many have since been repealed or overturned. State-level nunchaku bans on possession were initially passed in New York, Arizona, California, and Massachusetts, but only the Massachusetts ban remains:

- New York's nunchaku ban was ruled unconstitutional in the 2018 case Maloney v. Singas.
- The state of Arizona previously considered nunchaku to be a "prohibited weapon", making mere possession illegal, with the sole exception of nunchaku-like objects that are manufactured for use as illumination devices. A constitutional challenge failed, but Arizona legalized nunchaku in 2019.
- California prohibited nunchaku with exceptions for professional martial arts schools and practitioners, but the ban was repealed in 2021.
- Massachusetts law classifies nunchucks as "dangerous weapons", with an exemption for use in martial arts, and anyone found carrying them without proper authorization may face criminal charges.

== Law enforcement use ==
Nunchaku have been employed by a few American police departments for decades, especially after the popular Bruce Lee movies of the 1970's. For instance, in 2015, police in the small town of Anderson, California were trained and deployed to use nunchaku as a form of non-lethal force. They were selected because of their utility as both a striking weapon and a control tool.

Orcutt Police Nunchaku (OPN) had been adopted by more than 200 law enforcement agencies in the USA. Even though it could be used as a striking weapon, it was mainly used as a grappling implement on the wrists and ankles for pain compliance. They were very effective in that regard but improper use has been associated with injuries like wrist and limb breaks that led to them being phased out.

TASERs have become the preferred non-lethal weapon for most departments.

== Notable organizations ==
- World Nunchaku Association
- Hong Kong Nunchaku Association
- Nunchaku Association of India
- Palestinian Nunchaku Federation

== See also ==
- Arnis
- Butterfly sword
- Flail
- Meteor hammer
- Sai
- Tabak-Toyok
- Three-section staff
- Two-section staff
