= Kuwa language =

Kuwa is an alternative name of the Tangsa language of Myanmar and India.

Kuwaa is a language of Liberia.
