= Kuwa (weapon) =

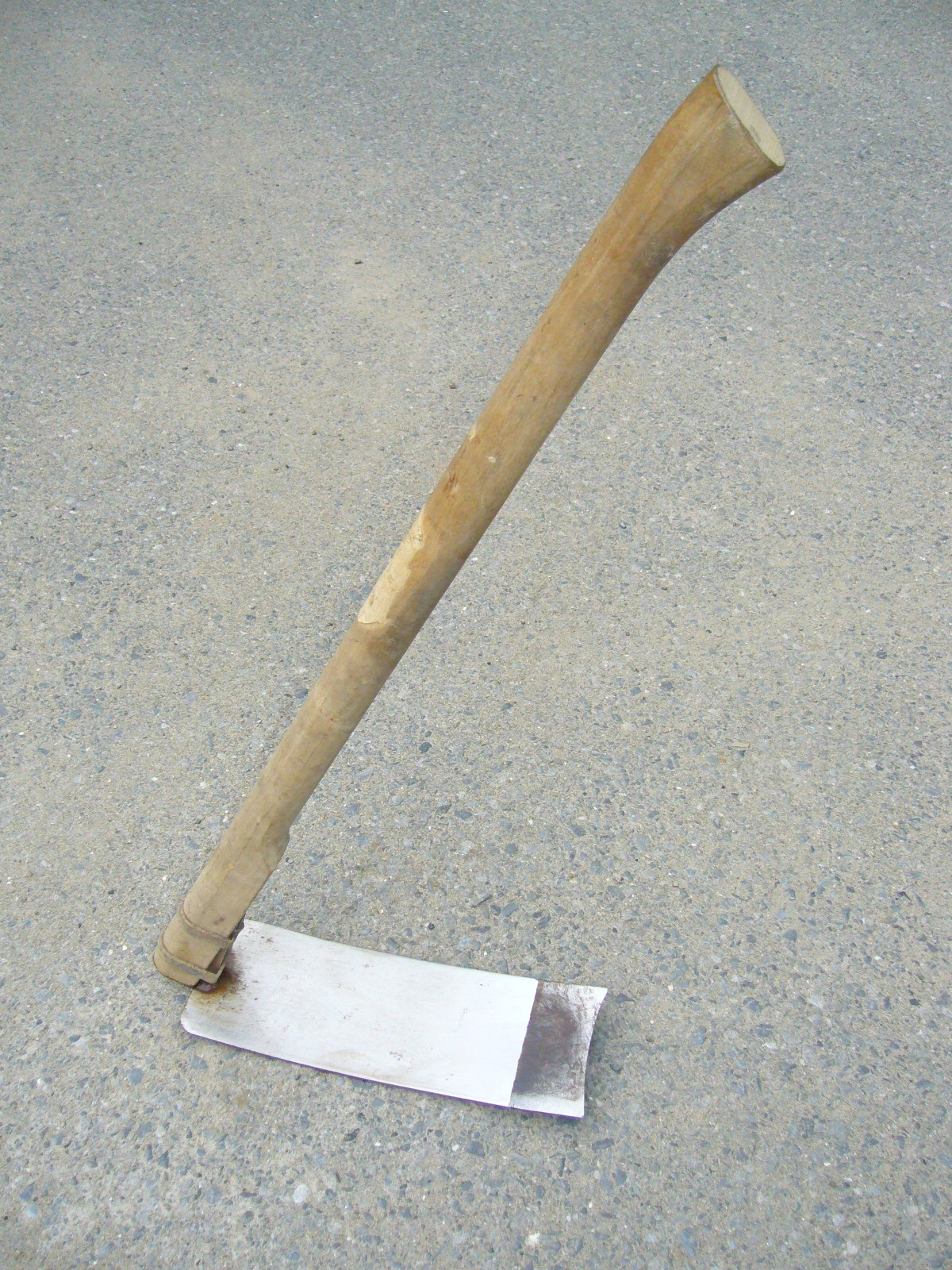
Kuwa (Japanese hoe).

The Kuwa is an Okinawan and Japanese weapon shaped like a gardening tool of the same name. The gardening tool kuwa is shaped like an adze and used similarly to a hoe. The weapon kuwa is used in Okinawan kobudō.
