= Taira Shinken =

Okinawan karateka

Shinken Taira (平 信賢, Taira Shinken; 1897–1970) was a Japanese martial artist, born as Shinken Maezato (前里 信賢, Maezato Shinken) in 1897 on Kume island in the Ryūkyū archipelago.

== Early life ==
He was the second son in a family of three boys and one girl. He was placed for adoption as a child (not an uncommon practice in old Japan). In his early life he took on his mother's maiden name of Maezato. Taira worked in the sulfur mines in Minamijima. He suffered a badly broken leg when he was trapped in a mine shaft collapse, which caused permanent damage to his leg.

== Karate ==
In 1922, after traveling to Tokyo to find work, he was introduced to Gichin Funakoshi, a fellow Okinawan and karate instructor. In 1929, Taira began his studies of Ryūkyū kobudō under Moden Yabiku.

In 1932 after studying kobudō for three years and karate for 10 years, he received permission from his masters to open his own dōjō. Taira began to teach karate and kobudō in the springs resort town of Ikaho, Gunma Prefecture.

In 1934, Taira became a student (deshi) of Kenwa Mabuni.

In 1940 Taira opened a kobudō dōjō in Naha, Okinawa. He also opened dojo in Kantō and Kansai, two major districts of central Japan.

== Taira's legacy ==
In the post-war era, even in Okinawa, the number of kobudo students was much lower than the number of karate students. To revitalize Okinawan kobudō study, in 1955 he established the Ryūkyū Kobudō Hozon Shinkokai as a continuation of Moden Yabiku's Ryukyu Kobujutsu Society.

In 1960, Taira was granted a shihan in the Nihon Kobudō Kenkyujo, and in 1963, he was made vice-president of the International Karate Kobudō Federation. On July 1, 1964, he was promoted to hanshi by the Japan Kobudō Federation. He was the first president of the Ryukyu Kobudō Preservation and Promotion Society(July 1970).

After his death in September 1970, Taira was succeeded in Ryūkyū Kobudō Hozon Shinkokai in Okinawa by Eisuke Akamine and in mainland Japan by Inoue Motokatsu.

Taira created the nunchaku kata taught in Ryukyu kobudō Maezato no Nunchaku.

Taira is credited with composing Maezato no Tekko, a kata using metal horse stirrups. The name Maezato relates to his birth name. He continued his studies in kobudo cataloging over 40 traditional weapons kata from around Okinawa.
