= Peichin Takahara =

Japanese karateka

- Born: 1683; Akata-Chō\Southern Shuri, Ryūkyū Kingdom
- Died: 1760
- Style: Ch'uan Fa
- Teacher(s): Chatan Yara,

Takahara Pēchin (高原 親雲上) was an early karate practitioner. Pēchin (親雲上) was a social class of the Ryūkyū Kingdom.

The principles of the dō ("way"), as explained by Takahara Pēchin, are: 1) ijō, the way-compassion, humility, and love. 2) katsu, the laws-complete understanding of all techniques and forms of karate, and 3) fo dedication-the seriousness of karate that must be understood not only in practice, but in actual combat. The collective translation is: "One’s duty to himself and his fellow man."

He was the first teacher of Sakugawa Kangi, the father of Sakugawa Kanga.
