= Tekkō =

Japanese weaponized stirrups and horseshoes

A stirrup or D-shaped tekko

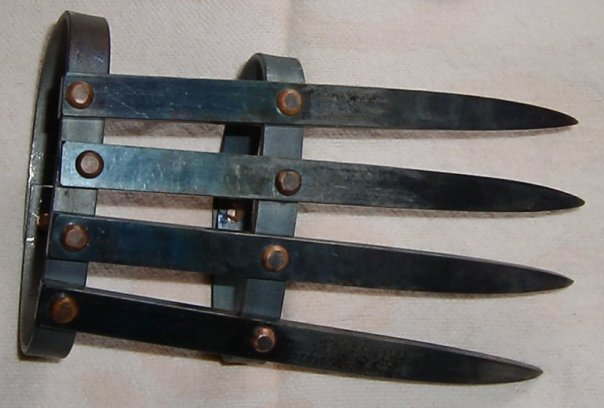
A clawed tekko-kagi

The tekkō (鉄甲; lit. "iron", "armor") are weaponized stirrups and horseshoes which originated in Okinawa, Japan, and they fall into the category of "fist-load weapons". By definition, a fist-load weapon increases the mass of the hand so that, given the physical proportionality between the fist's momentum and its mass, it increases the force the bearer can deliver. Some fist-load weapons may also serve, in the same manner, as the guard on a sword, to protect the structure of the bearer's hand.

A variant of the weapon known as tekkō-kagi (手甲鉤, lit. "back of the hand hooks") is characterized by four iron nails like bear claws attached to a metal ring. Worn over the hands, the claws could be used for scraping and striking. It is used for both offensive and defensive purposes as the wielder can slash and defend with natural hand motions. Additionally, with proper technique, it could be used for ensnaring and disarming weapons.

== History ==
The tekko evolved after five stages of development. The first, called the "yawara", consisted of nothing more than a stick or rod, held in the inside the hand. The "chize kun bo", a stick with a loop of rope, which the user could attach to the hand for control, came second. Third, the "tekko" resembled the "chize kun bo" but, rather than a rope, had a sharpened wooden extension of the stick, which fit between the first or second finger. An Okinawan tool to help fisherman weave, or haul in their nets without cutting their hand on coral, or a long hairpin used by Okinawan Bushi called a "kanzashi", quite possibly served as the inspiration for this design. The tekko appeared in hardwood form, and as soft molded metal so as to greater increase the mass of the hand.

The fourth stage, or "tek chu", allowed for increased function over its predecessors in that it "extended beyond the clenched fist", "a distinct advancement in the evolution of fist-loaded weaponry". The design consisted either of a wooden stick carved with a wooden extension with a finger hole, or of a metal rod with a metal finger ring. The bearer held the rod in hand, and ensured their grip by putting their index or middle finger through the ring, which often bore a protruding carved or metal spike.

Tecchū, a traditional okinawan weapon to be held in the fist, securing the position by putting ones middle or index finger through the ring.

Use of the true "tekko" per se started with the "horseshoe tekko". Because weapons were banned in Okinawa, the Okinawans sought to put otherwise agricultural implements to martial use. "The use of the horseshoe appears to have originated when Bushi in Okinawa used the shoes of their horses as makeshift weapons to defend themselves against surprise attack." "They simply put a horseshoe into the hand to punch with" (Ryukyu Hon Kenpo Kobjutsu Federation). Held as a "U" with the hand in the middle, the two ends extended outwards.

Practitioners also tied two horseshoes together directly facing and overlapping each other. This design provided greater hand mass, and defensive guard, but resulted in larger weapons, not easily concealed, and more difficult to learn. The improved horseshoe tekko featured the two horseshoes welded together. However, the popularity of the horseshoe tekko faded, as attention turned to the smaller, more concealable horse stirrup.

== Construction ==
Artisans crafted the traditional stirrup upon which the modern design evolved from either wood or metal and were often made from a piece of flat bar, bent into a horseshoe shape and held together by a bolt, to form a "D" shape. For weapons application, would-be combatants sometimes enhanced the design by embedding additional bolts into the horseshoe shape, to inflict greater injury. Other styles of tekko exhibit sharp protrusions at either end and three spikes representative of the position of the knuckles.

As the most recent incarnation, the stirrup version remains the favorite of a predominance of kobudo practitioners. Controversy surrounds the stirrup tekko. because many kobudo practitioners liken them to "brass knuckles", the possession of which the jurisdiction of many states prohibit as concealed weapons. Owning, and carrying this brass knuckles, often has legal ramifications.

However, "brass knuckles" have finger dividers; stirrup tekko do not. Although many kobudo practitioners claim that brass knuckles evolved from the tekko, brass knuckles more closely resembles the handle of the Western "trench knife". One cannot always distinguish between the appearance of the tekko and that of the knives. Westerners came in contact with Okinawan martial art in the 1940s. The trench knife, and Western brass knuckles, date back to World War I (with pictures of the "brass knuckle handle" trench knife dating back to 1917).

Another controversy surrounds the desire of some kobudo practitioners to revive the horseshoe tekko. Differing schools advocate for the stirrup or horseshoe. Although advocates for the stirrup tekko emphasize near consensus, the horseshoe tekko practitioners concern themselves not so much with the forward evolution of the weapons as with the preservation of the original Okinawan cultural "jutsus" or "art forms".

Advocates of the horseshoe version argue that the design best suits the functions as passed down in traditional kata for the weapon. Specific features of the horseshoe tekko, not found in the stirrup version, allow for new and interesting applications to emerge. In form and function, the horseshoe tekko more closely resembles a specialized knife such as a "double knife," a miniature "moon knife" or "duck knife".

Unlike "brass knuckles" that rely primarily on "bludgeoning", the horseshoe tekko emphasizes "shielding against" (blocking) and "hooking" (capturing) incoming weapons attack, as well as "stabbing" an opponent or "hooking" anatomically vital points.

== Current practitioners ==
Current practitioners of tekko kata include those in the lineage of Master Taira Shinken also called Ryukyu kobudo, which features the kata Maezato no tekko. Other tekko kata include Maezato no tekko (Ryu Kon Kai), Akamine, Takemyoshi, Miyazato, Kakazu, Kaneigawa, and Matayoshi (odo). The kata include heavy use of slashing and stabbing movements. The tekko of Okinawan kobudo (weapons kata) can be used to grip, squeeze and impale various parts of the anatomy at close quarters.

The use of tekko remains an eclectic weapon used by select martial artists to practice discipline, and to express an ancient form of art. Current experts in the area usually will not teach the discipline unless the prospective student already has displayed appropriate demeanor over the course of many years for the training in other martial arts areas.

== See also ==
- List of martial arts weapons
- Brass knuckles
- Deer horn knives
- Vajra-mushti
