= Motokatsu Inoue =

Japanese martial artist

Motokatsu Inoue (1918-1993) was a Japanese martial artist, noted as the Grandmaster of Yui Shin Kai and Ryukyu Kobujutsu The first man to be awarded 'Hanshi' (Menkyo Kaiden) by Taira Shinken.

== Life and career ==
Inoue was born in Tokyo, the son of a general and grandson of Katsura Taro, former prime minister of Japan. He began training in martial arts at an early age, taught by the security specialist at his family home, Soke Seiko Fujita (1898-1966), who was headmaster of Kōga-ryū Ninjutsu and considered the last true Ninja. Inoue later trained under Yasuhiro Konishi and Taira Shinken where he studied the weapons practice of Ryūkyū Kobujutsu Hozon Shinkokai. Inoue went on to found his own style of karate called Yui Shin Kai.

Inoue published a number of pamphlets and a three volume set of books detailing Kobudo kata which were published in Japan. A number of his works were also later published in English.
