= Tinbe-rochin =

Okinawan arms and armor

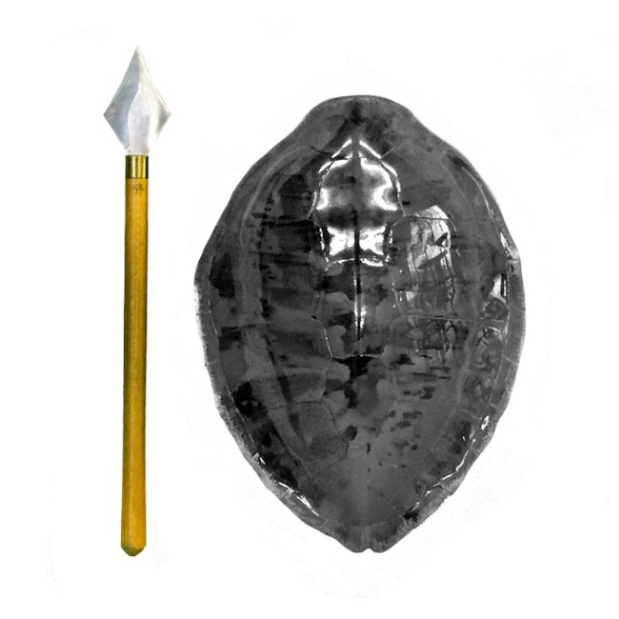
Tinbe and Rochin weapon set

Tinbe and Rochin in use

The term Tinbe-Rochin refers to an arms and armor combination of a short spear (rochin, ローチン) and a shield (tinbe or tinbei, ティンベー). It is one of the least well-known Okinawan weapon systems. The tinbe can be made of various materials but is commonly found in vine, cane, metal, or turtle shell. The shield size is generally about 45 cm long and 38 cm wide. The length of the rochin is usually equivalent to the length of the forearm and can be found in many differing designs varying from spears to short swords and machete-style (seiryuto) implements. In use, the techniques tend to be circular in order to avoid excessive contact with the shield. The short spear is predominantly used in an upward stabbing motion, piercing armor under the rib cage, armpits, and throat although dependent upon the type of Rochin used, slashing motions can also be employed.
