= Kūsankū =

18th-century Chinese martial artist

Kung Hsiang Chun
- Born: unknown Qing China
- Died: unknown
- Other names: Kusanku
- Style: Quan-fa (Kempo)

Other information
- Notable students: Chatan Yara

Kusanku (クーサンクー) or Kung Hsiang Chun (公相君) was a Chinese martial artist who is said to have visited Okinawa during the Ryukyu Kingdom in the mid-18th century. He performed a martial art called quan-fa (拳法) in Ryukyu, which is believed to have contributed to the later development of kempo, and then later karate.

According to "Ōshima Records" (大島筆記, 1762) by Yoshihiro Tobe, on April 26, 1762 (lunar calendar), a ship carrying Ryukyuan envoys set sail for Satsuma (present Kagoshima Prefecture). On the way, however, it was caught in a storm and drifted ashore on Ōshima, a small island in Tosa (present Kochi Prefecture). The crew consisted of 52 people, including Shiohira Pēchin Seisei (潮平親雲上盛成).

The book, "Ōshima Records," is a record of interviews conducted by Tōbe Yoshihiro, a Confucian scholar of the Tosa Domain, with the crew members, and contains a detailed description of the domestic situation in Ryukyū in the mid-18th century, including descriptions of Kūsankū and Quan-fa (literally, fist method).

The book describes a recent visit to Ryukyu by a Chinese martial arts master named Kung Hsiang Chun, who demonstrated a martial art called quan-fa. The "recent" refers to the year 1756, when the Qing Dynasty's envoy visited Ryukyu, and it is commonly believed that Kung Hsiang Chun may have been a military officer on this envoy's mission. Kung Hsiang Chun is the Okinawan dialect for Kusanku.

There is no mention anywhere of a relationship with karate or his teaching of quan-fa to the people of Ryukyu, but this book has been repeatedly mentioned in connection with karate because it is one of the few references to bare-knuckle martial arts in the Ryukyu Kingdom period.

According to Tobe, "Kung Hsiang Chun" is a title in praise of the man and not his real name. Hence, the identity of Kung Hsiang Chun is unknown, although various guesses have been made to this day.

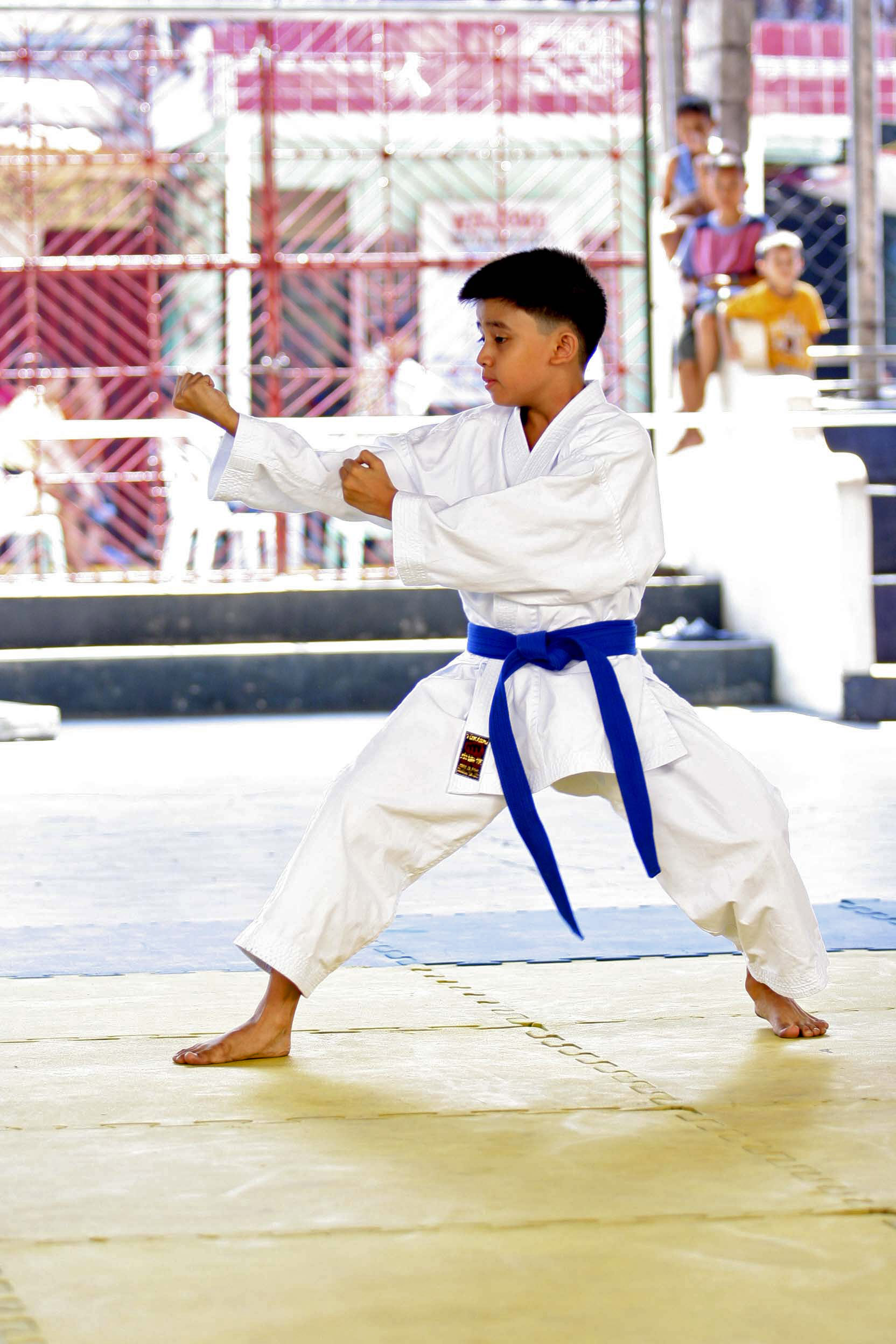
Young karateka performing Kūsankū-shō

The karate kata "Kūsankū" is said to be a kata taught by Kung Hsiang Chun, but there are no primary historical documents to prove this, the only evidence is the name of the kata and oral tradition. This kata was passed down from Kung Hsiang Chun's student Chatan Yara. Many variations of Kusanku kata exist, however the most unique one is known as "Chatanyara no Kusanku" in Matsubayashi-ryu, Shito-ryu and Isshin-ryu, this version was passed on by a student of Chatan Yara known as Kanga Sakugawa, and then to Bushi Matsumura. The kata of Matsubayashi-ryu, Shito-ryu and Isshin-ryu remain unaltered by Anko Itosu. Unlike the Kushanku Dai (Kosokun Dai and Kanku Dai) and Kushanku Sho (Kosokun Sho and Kanku Sho).
