= Eku =

Ancient Japanese weapon

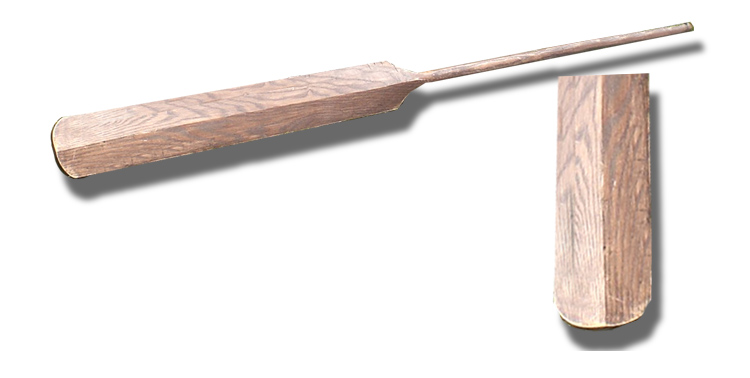
Example of an oak eku 72" long with closeup of round end and ridged spine on top side

An eku (sometimes spelled eiku or ieku) is an ancient weapon of Okinawan kobudō. Its first intended purpose is as an oar.

== See also ==
- Culacula
- Taiaha
