= Sakugawa Kanga =

Karateka

Kanga Sakugawa 佐久川 寛賀
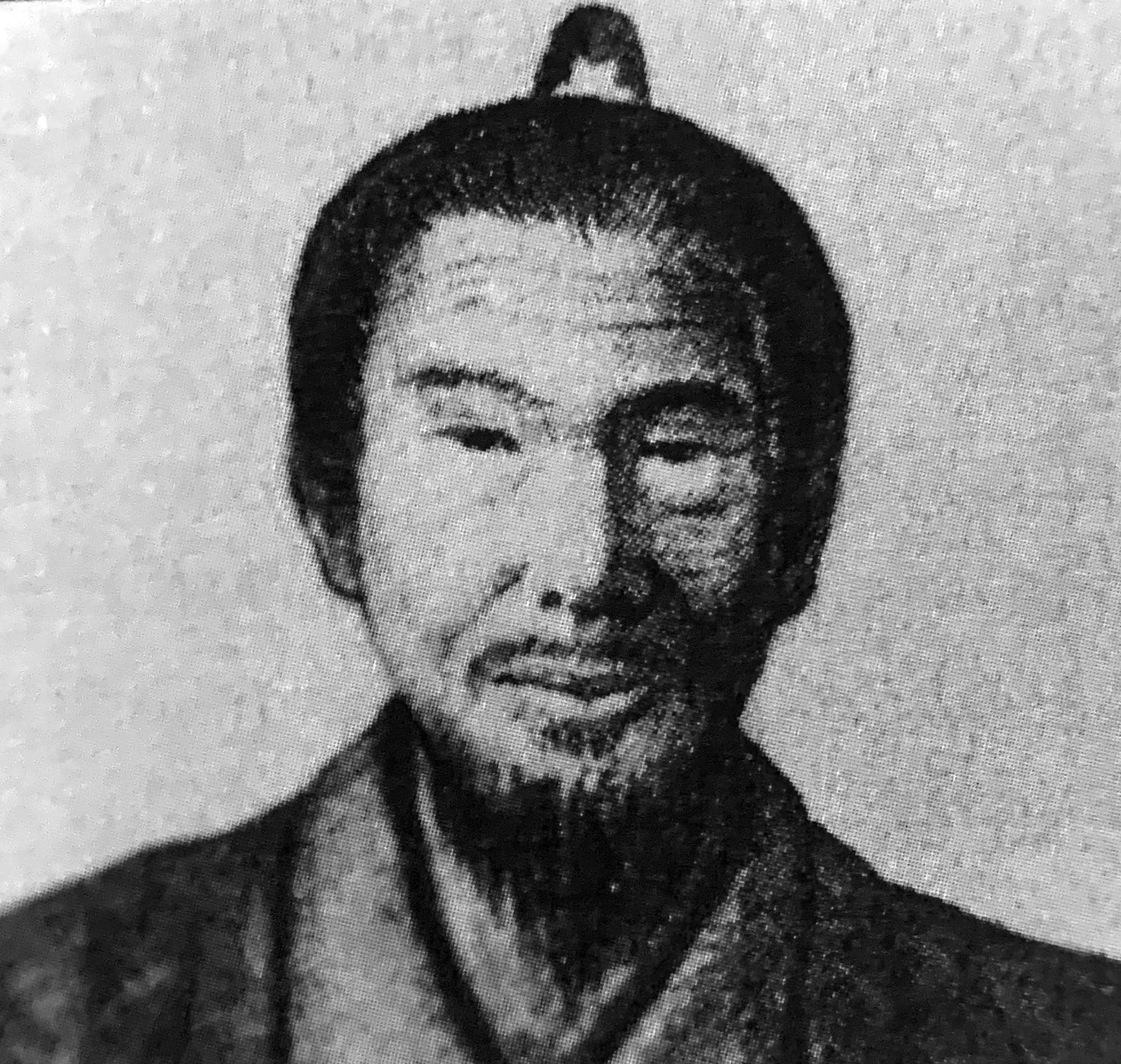
- Born: 1786; Akata village, Shuri, Ryūkyū Kingdom
- Died: 1867 (aged 80–81)
- Other names: Sakugawa Satunushi, Tode Sakugawa
- Style: Te
- Teachers: Kūsankū, Kangi Sakugawa

Other information
- Notable students: Sōkon Matsumura, Bushi Tachimura

Kanga Sakugawa (佐久川 寛賀, Sakugawa Kanga; 1786 - 1867), also Sakugawa Satunushi and Tode Sakugawa, was a Ryūkyūan martial arts master and major contributor to the development of Te, the precursor to modern Karate.

== Karate-do ==
Kanga "Tode" Sakugawa trained under his father Kangi Sakugawa. Kangi Sakugawa began his training as a student of a Ryūkyūan monk, Peichin Takahara. After six years of training, Takahara suggested that Kangi Sakugawa train under Kusanku, a Chinese master in Ch'uan Fa. Kangi Sakugawa spent six years training with Kusanku, and began to teach his son Kanga. Kanga became such an expert that people gave him the nickname Tōde ("Chinese Hand"). Kanga Sakugawa then spread what he learned to Ryūkyū in the 1810s. Kanga Sakugawa's most famous student, Matsumura Sōkon, went on to develop the Shuri-te which later develop into a number of karate styles including Shotokan, Shito-ryu, and Shōrin-ryū.

== Meeting with Kusanku ==
Oral tradition describes Sakugawa as a mischievous youth, some stories say that he was walking near a river one day when he saw an older Chinese gentleman gazing upon the water. As a prank, he went to push the man into the river and instead was grabbed by that man in an iron grip. The man turned out to be the Chinese martial artist Kusanku. Kusanku chastised the youth but then a student of Kusanku introduced him to Tode Sakugawa, then Kusanku offered to instruct him further in Chinese martial arts. Sakugawa consulted with his instructor at the time, Takahara, who encouraged him to learn from the Chinese master.

== Influences on modern Karate ==
Kanga Sakugawa's most famous student, Matsumura Sōkon, went on to develop Shuri-te which later develop into a number of karate styles including Shotokan, Shito-ryu, Wado-ryu and Shōrin-ryū.
