= Sai (weapon) =

Pointed melee weapon from Okinawa

Two modern sai

The sai (Japanese: 釵, lit. 'hairpin'; Chinese: 鐵尺, lit. 'iron ruler', or Sau cha 手叉 lit. 'hand-fork' in Cantonese) is a pointed melee weapon from Okinawa. It was historically utilized in martial arts such as Okinawan kobudō and southern Chinese martial arts, and has been absorbed into the curriculum of many modern martial arts. The sai is primarily used for poking, striking, parrying and disarming opponents. It consists of a dull-tipped metal main prong, that projects from a one-handed handle, two shorter metal side prongs, which project from opposite sides of the base of the main prong and point in the same direction as it, and a blunt metal pommel fixed to the bottom end of the handle. The sai came to international attention when Okinawan kobudō and karate reached international popularity in the mid-20th century.

== History ==
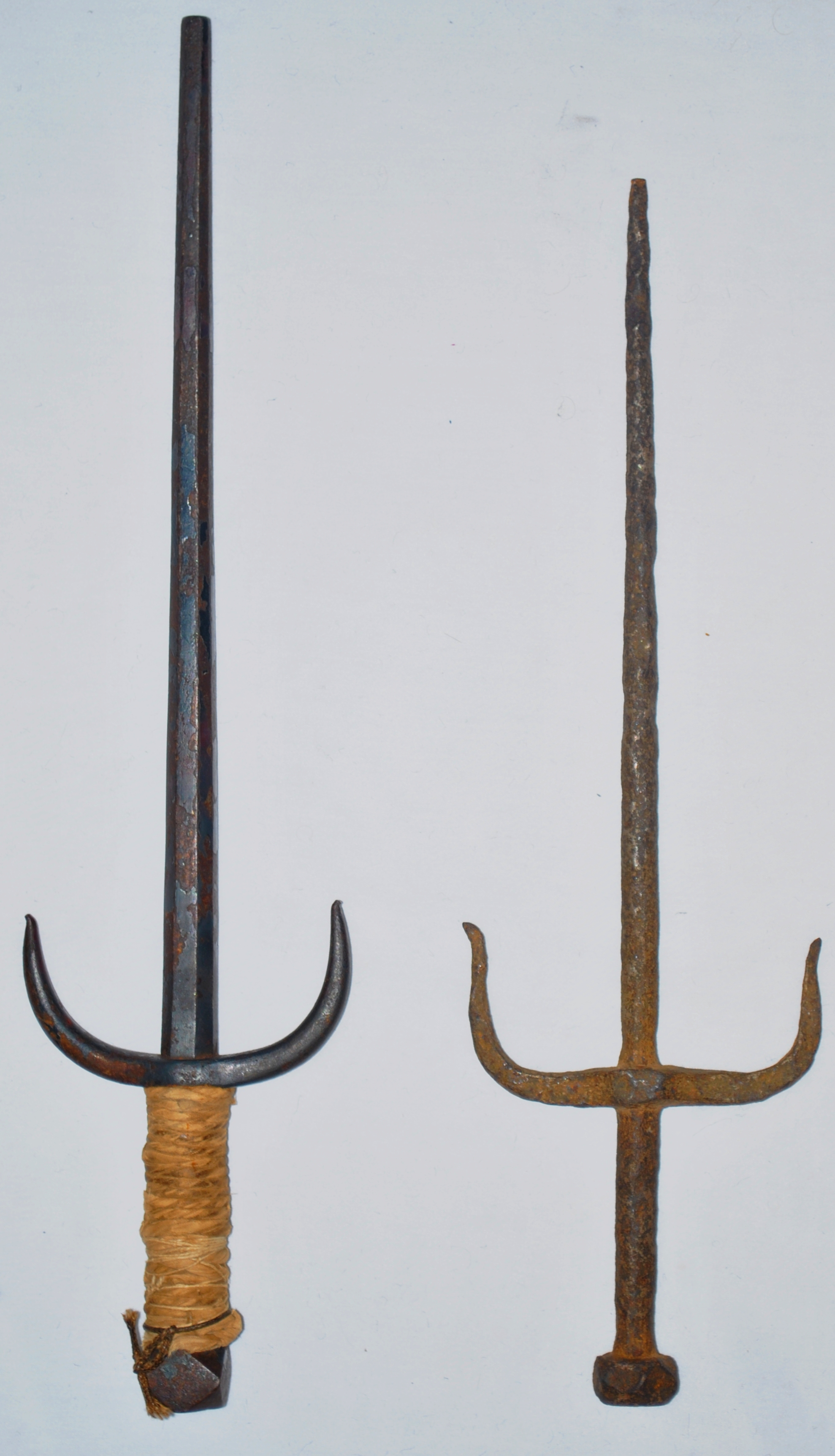
An antique sai (left) and an antique tekpi (right)

Before the creation of the sai in Okinawa, similar weapons were already being used in other Asian countries including India, Thailand, China, Vietnam, Malaysia, and Indonesia. The basic concept of this kind of weapon was brought to Okinawa over time from one or several of these places. However, the sai is the Okinawan take on this weapon concept, and should not be mixed with other similar weapons.

Some sources theorize that this weapon concept may be based on the Indian trisula, an ancient Hindu-Buddhist symbol that may have spread along with Hinduism and Buddhism into South-East Asia. The word trisula itself can refer to either a long or short-handled trident.

In Okinawa, the sai was used by the domestic police (ufuchiku) to arrest criminals and for crowd control. Use of the sai in Okinawan kobudō was approved in 1668 by Moto Chohei, an Okinawan prince.

Japan had a similar weapon, the jitte, which was originally used as a blunt weapon by guards in the Shogun's palace, and it was subsequently issued to senior officials as a badge of office. Edo period examples of the jitte typically have only a single hook. The relationship between the sai and jitte is unclear.

== Etymology and Morphology ==
Because there is no morphological plural in Japanese, the word "sai" refers to either a single weapon or multiple. Nicho sai refers to a kata that uses two sai, while sancho sai kata refers to kata using three sai. However, as a loanword in English, it is not necessary to follow Japanese morphology, so it is also acceptable to pluralize the word with a terminal -s, as is the standard practice for making plural nouns in English morphology.

== Parts (in Okinawan) ==
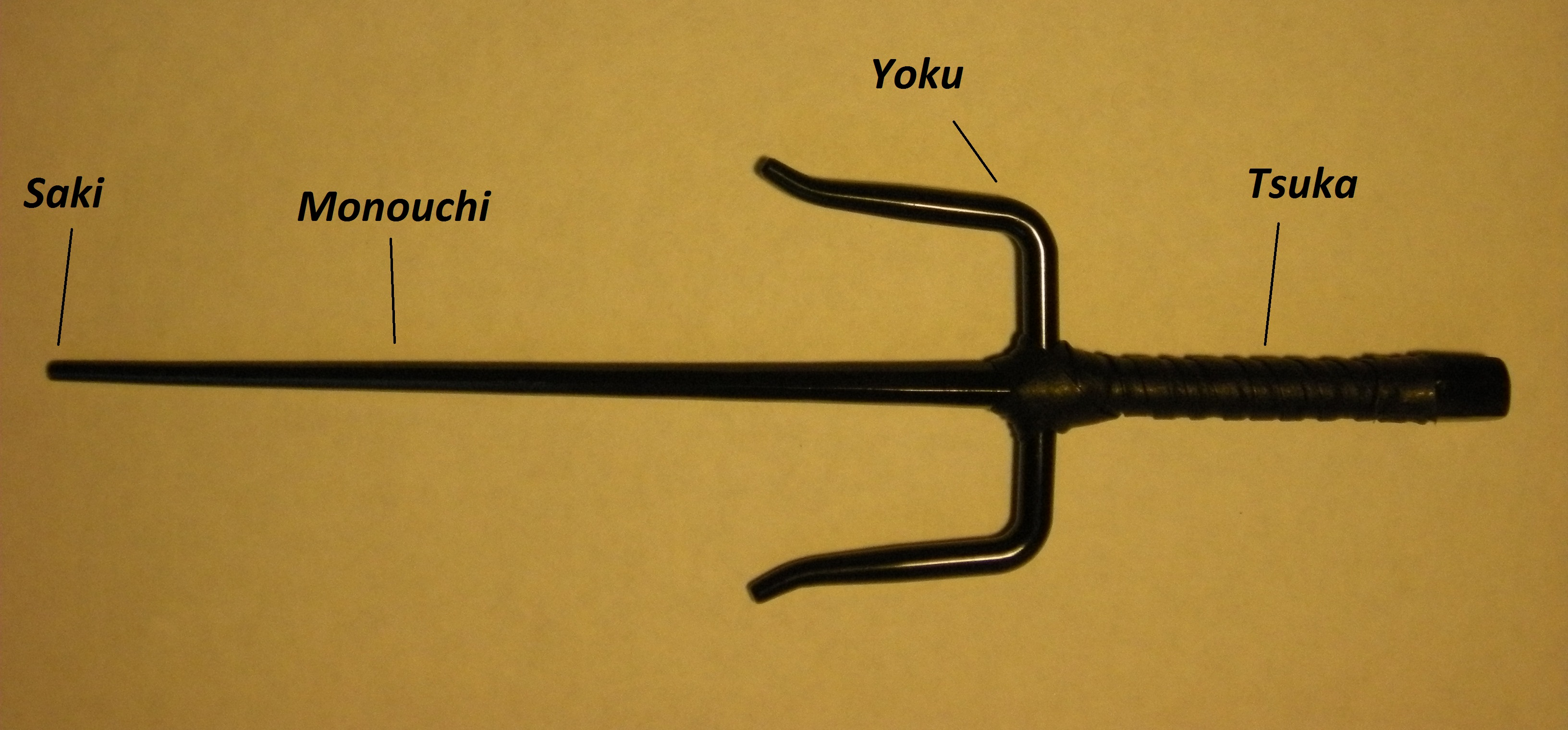
Parts of a modern sai

- Monouchi, the metal main prong of the sai, that is either round or faceted.
- Saki, the sharp point of the main prong.
- Yoku, the two shorter metal side prongs of the sai, which usually point in the same direction as the main prong, with the exception of the manji sai developed by Taira Shinken, which has the direction of one of the side prongs reversed, causing the weapon to be reminiscent of a swastika (manji).

A modern manji sai

- Tsume, the sharp points of the two side prongs.
- Moto, the center point between the two side prongs.
- Tsuka, the one-handed handle of the sai, which is usually wrapped with different materials or given different treatments to add more grip to it.
- Tsukagashira, the blunt metal pommel of the sai.

== Technique ==
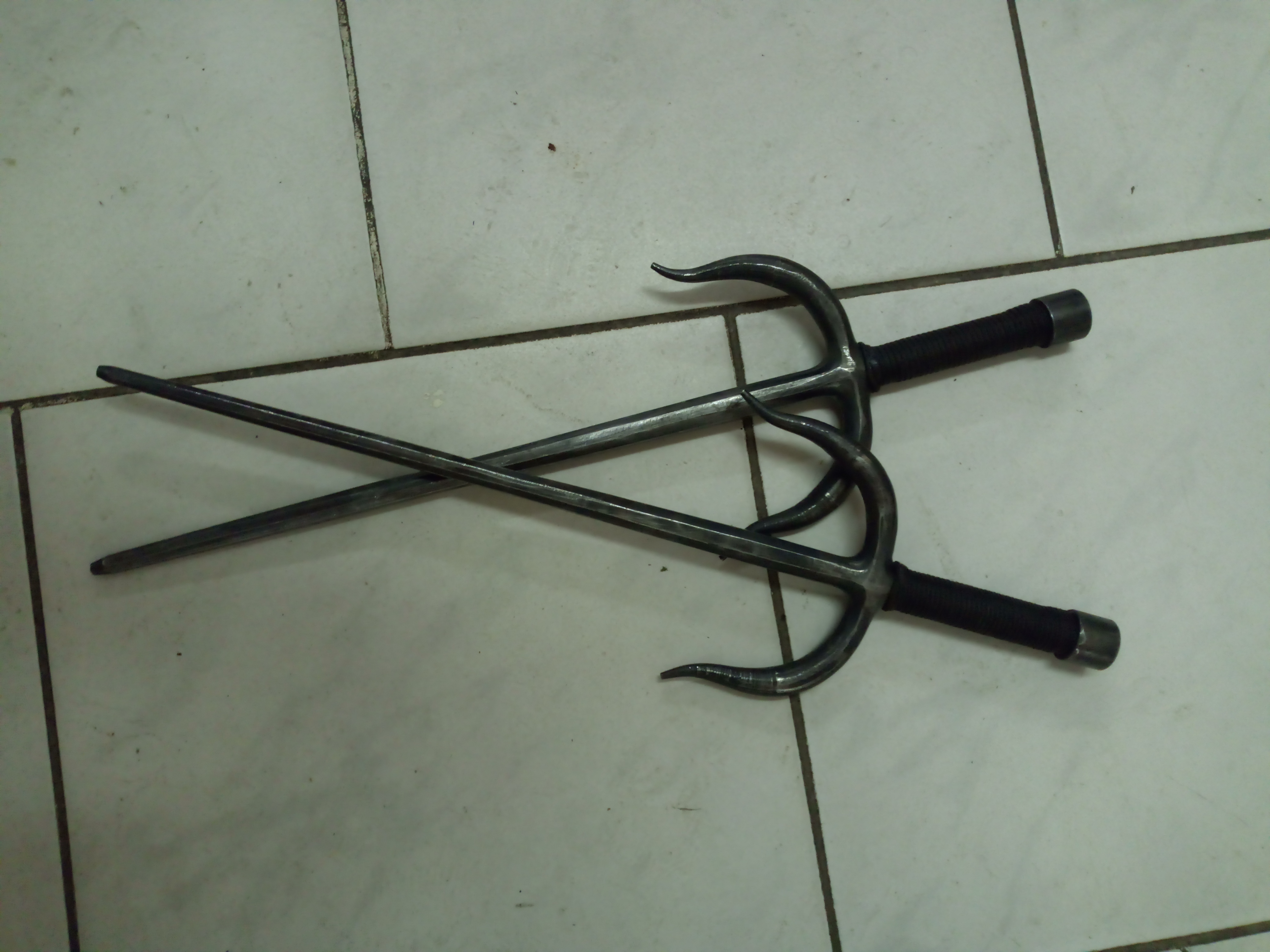
A pair of modern sai

The sai is a weapon typically wielded in pairs, with one in each hand. In modern Okinawan Kobudo, five kata (choreographed patterns of movements in martial arts) are commonly taught, including two kihon kata.

The utility of the sai is given away by its distinctive trident-like shape. It is a weapon primarily used for fast stabbing and striking, but being very versatile, it has many other uses as well. These include a variety of blocks, parries and captures against attackers from all directions and height levels. Use of the main prong, the smaller side prongs, and the pommel is emphasized, as well as rapid grip changes for multiple fast stabs and strikes.

One commonly depicted technique in sai kata is the use of one of the sai's side prongs to entrap an opponent's weapon and then disarm them of it. Some variations of the sai have the two side prongs pointing inwards towards the main prong to facilitate this maneuver. While this does not completely immobilize the attacker, it encumbers them in close quarters.

== In popular culture ==
The sai is known in American comic books as the signature weapon of Elektra, a ninja femme fatale anti-hero. Her creator, Frank Miller, described their utility for her:

It's referred to as a karate weapon, since the power of almost every karate blow can be amplified with it. [...] It's called a sai. Since it makes every karate blow more powerful, it would be a natural weapon for a woman to use. It makes her able to reach further. Since she's smaller than most of her opponents, this is the sort of weapon that would help her.

Dual sai are also the signature weapons of Raphael of the Teenage Mutant Ninja Turtles.

== See also ==
- Okinawan kobudō
- Tekpi
- Nunti Bō
- Trident

== Bibliography ==
- Decker, Dwight R. (1982). "Frank Miller: A Talk with the Writer Artist of Daredevil". The Comics Journal (70, Winter 1981-1982): 68–95.
