= Pechin =

Rank in the Ryukyu Kingdom aristocracy

Pechin (親雲上, Pēchin), or Pekumi (親雲上, Pēkumi), historically 大やこもい Opoyakomoi, was a rank among the Yukatchu class of the former Ryukyu Kingdom (modern-day Okinawa, Japan), above the rank of Satunushi and below the rank of Ueekata. As scholar-officials, they often served in administrative positions in the Ryukyuan government. Placed in the upper class, the Pechin would often travel with a servant at their side.

There were three ranks of Pechin: Chikudun Pechin (筑登之親雲上), Satunushi Pechin (里之子親雲上), and Pekumi or Pechin.

== See also ==
- Arakaki Seishō
- Gushiken surname
- Okinawa Prefecture
- Pechin Higa
- Pechin Takahara
- Ryukyuan people
