= Grapple (tool) =

Hook or claw used to catch or hold something

A grapple is a hook or claw used to catch or hold something. A ship's anchor is a type of grapple, especially the "grapnel" anchor.

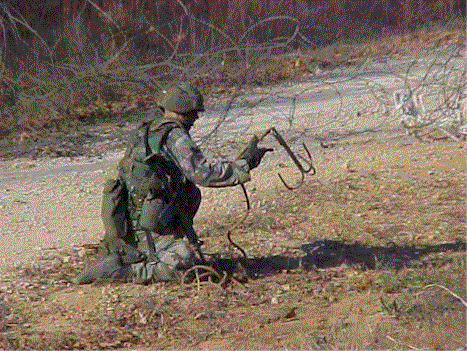
A soldier loading a hook.

A throwing grapple, kaginawa (or "grappling hook" ) is a multi-pronged hook that is tied to a rope and thrown/launched to catch a grip, as on a parapet or branch of a tree. It may also be used in a boat to "drag" the bottom of a waterway to hook debris or to find missing objects.

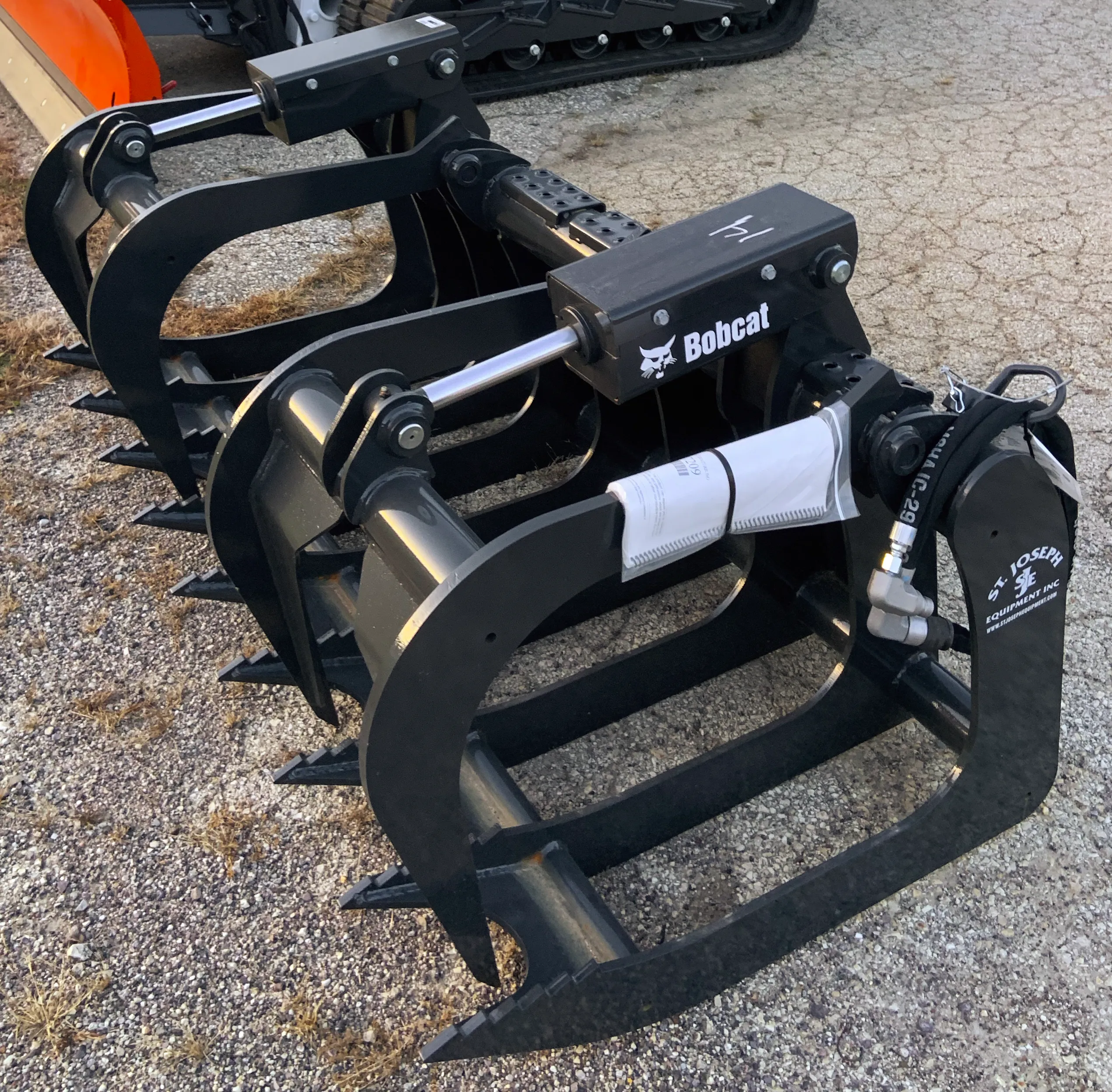
Skid-steer grapple

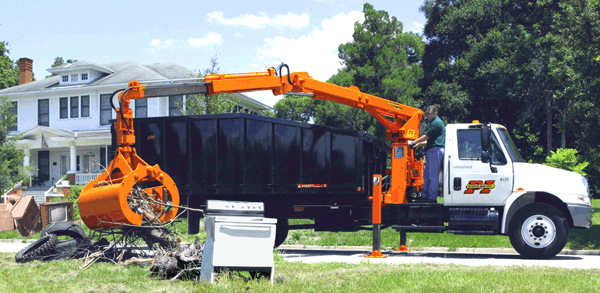
Grapple truck

In logging and other engineering vehicles, a grapple is a hydraulically powered claw with two or more opposing levers that pinch a log or other materials, usually to lift or drag them.

The logging grapple used in swing yarding is not moved by hydraulics but by cables. To open and close the tongs of the grapple, two cables are used. One is tensioned and the other is slacked off to move the tongs. A third cable goes back to the tail hold then to the yarder. This third cable is used to pull the grapple out into the setting and to create tension for lifting the grapple in the air.

A grapple can be mounted to a tractor or excavator with a movable arm that may lift, extend/retract, and move side-to-side (pivot or rotate). Some machines also have a separate control for rotating the grapple.

Simpler grapple machines consist of a hydraulically liftable fork, rake ("grapple rake"), or bucket and a movable, opposing "thumb" (one or more hooks or levers) that enclose and grip materials for lifting or dragging. A "demolition bucket" or "multi-purpose bucket" on a loader may also operate as a grapple whereby the bottom and rear side of the bucket are hinged and can be forced apart or together with hydraulic cylinders.

A lifting grapple is a type of hardware that can be attached to most large, heavy, or bulky objects to provide a feature on the item to which material handling equipment can attach. Lifting grapples sometimes double as tie downs, allowing heavy items to be held firmly in place by providing a point to which ropes or chains can be attached to the item to hold it in place.

The term grapple is also used in the surfboard industry to refer to a leash connector.

A police grappler is a device that attaches the front bumper of a police car to the rear wheel of another vehicle, by way of heavy-duty nylon straps. It is used during a police pursuit to slow and stop a fleeing vehicle.

== See also ==
- Kyoketsu-shoge
- Piton
- Robot end effector
- Skidder, especially with a grapple claw
