= Peton =

Peton may refer to:

- Piton, a metal spike to aid climbing
- A 5-face in a polytope
- Howard le Peton (1895–1981), Welsh-born Irish cricketer
