= Kusarigama =

Traditional Japanese weapon

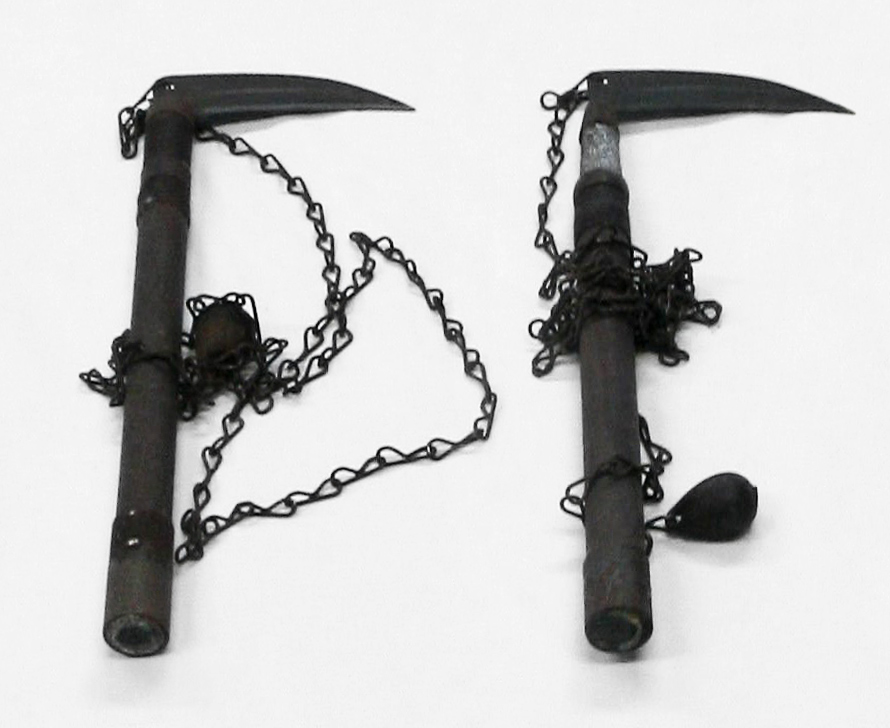
Two kusarigama

A kusarigama (Japanese: 鎖鎌; lit. "chain-sickle") is a traditional Japanese weapon that consists of a kama (the Japanese equivalent of a sickle or billhook) on a kusari-fundo – a type of metal chain (kusari) with a heavy iron weight (fundo) at the end. The kusarigama is said to have been developed during the Muromachi period. The art of handling the kusarigama is called kusarigamajutsu.

== History ==
The researcher Nawa Yumio believes that the kusarigama was based on the jingama, a tool that resembles a sickle, which was used to cut through a horse's ropes in the case of a fire. The jingama could also be used as a weapon and according to Nawa, the tool might have been combined with a konpi (棍飛), which is a chain that contained a weighted end and a chain around the user's wrist. People would wield the weapons with both hands to protect their horses against criminals. Another theory is that the kusarigama is based on the tobiguchi (ja:鳶口), which is a type of axe that had a "stout haft and a short pick-like blade".

There is no evidence of the kusarigama being used as a battlefield weapon in mass combat. Swinging its long chain could endanger allies and it would be ineffective against armor. The weapon is at its most useful when wielded against an opponent who attacks with a sword; it is not as useful against a longer weapon such as a spear, a naginata, or a bō. Perhaps, it was carried as a backup weapon, being light weight and compact. It is likely that the kusarigama was common during the Edo period, used against swordsmen and as a training weapon, but it was first created during the Muromachi period.

From the 12th century, until the time of the Tokugawa shogunate, many fighters specialized in the use of the weapon. One of these fighters was Yamada Shinryukan, a man who defeated many swordsmen; he was trapped in a bamboo grove by Araki Mataemon and killed. Yamada did not have enough room in the bamboo grove to swing around the chain of his kusarigama. The weapon has been used by ninja. The kusarigama has also been used as a "plaything for warriors with time on their hands, and a means of attracting rural students who wished to do something unique in their local festivals". Samurai women used the weapon as well.

The schools of kenjutsu, jūjutsu, and naginatajutsu taught kusarigamajutsu, the art of handling the kusarigama. It combined the aspects of kamajutsu, kusarijutsu, and fundojutsu. Kamajutsu refers to the kama (sickle), kusarijutsu refers to the chain, and fundojutsu refers to the weight. Kusari-fundo refers to the chain combined with the iron weight.

A handle of a kusarigama is surrounded by raden, which is a lacquer wood inlay that contains pieces of mother-of-pearl. The handle often has metal bands or strips for reinforcement at either end.

Ellis Amdur’s book Old School: Essays on Japanese Martial Traditions retells a myth about the origin of the kusarigama. In the story, a farmer who used a farming sickle to cut his rice plants was attacked by a samurai. The farmer used the sickle with a chain attachment to defeat the warrior. According to Amdur, trapping an opponent with the chain is not effective, and a farmer's sickle would be an awkward weapon. He also states that there is no evidence for peasant use of the kusarigama or that it was derived from a farmer's tool. However, Donn F. Draeger mentions in his book Comprehensive Asian Fighting Arts that the sickle, referring to the kama, was originally used for agriculture and later became used as a weapon.

== Methods of use ==
Attacking with the weapon usually entailed swinging the weighted chain in a large circle over one's head, and then whipping it forward to entangle an opponent's spear, sword, or other weapon, or immobilizing their arms or legs. This allows the kusarigama user to easily rush forward and strike with the sickle.

There are three types of kusarigama. The first type has a weapon in the shape of a sickle that has a chain attached to the end of its shaft. The use of the first type depends on the ryū (school), with the weapon being held in either hand and its chain and weight being held in the other hand to be swung at the other person. Depending on how easy it is to see the weapon's weight move, "it can be deflected or blocked". One hit with the kusarigama is typically not able to stop someone from attacking and the weight needs to be "reeled in" by the wielder again so that a second attack can be made. The second type of kusarigama has the chain "attached at the base of the blade" and it is much more powerful than the first type. The second type allows the wielder to use quick attacks and it can continue to be used if the weapon is deflected. It only takes one hand to operate the second type and the other hand can be used for another form of combat. The third type "has a straight blade, hafted at right angles, with a handguard set at the blade side". The chain is attached to the weapon's base and it is controlled with both hands, similar to the first type of kusarigama.

== Modern use ==
Issue 9 of This Is Japan by The Asahi Shimbun stated, "Maybe, the most unusual Japanese martial art is that which employs the kusarigama. The fact that it has survived through history gives mute testimony to its effectiveness. Yet, the casual observer, untrained in its use, would be apt to regard it as a foolish toy." A book by Tadashi Yamashita that teaches people how to use the Okinawan kusarigama was advertised in the magazine Black Belt in the 1980s.

== Legality ==
In the Republic of Ireland, the kusarigama is classified as an illegal offensive weapon. The Firearms and Offensive Weapons Act 1990 in Ireland does not allow the kusarigama, and other similar weapons, to be manufactured, imported, or sold. These actions can result in imprisonment for up to seven years.

== See also ==
- Chain weapon
- Chigiriki
- Kaginawa
- Kusari-fundo
- Kyoketsu-shoge
- Okinawan kusarigama, Okinawan chain and sickle weapon
