= Kama (tool) =

Japanese farming implement and weapon

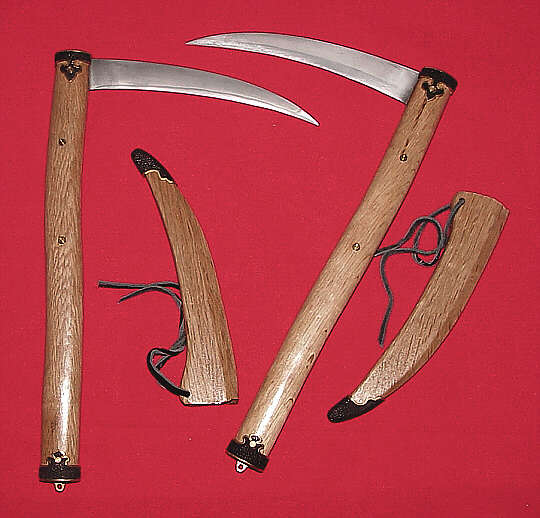
Kama

The kama (鎌 or かま) is a traditional Japanese farming implement similar to a sickle or billhook used for reaping crops and also employed as a weapon. It is often included in weapon training segments of martial arts. Sometimes referred to as kai or "double kai," kama made with intentionally dull blades for kata demonstration purposes are referred to as kata kai.

== History ==
Before being improvised as a weapon, the kama was widely used throughout Asia to cut crops, mostly rice. It is found in many shapes and forms in Southeast Asia and is particularly common in martial arts from Malaysia, Indonesia and the Philippines. From one or both of these areas, the kama was brought to Okinawa and incorporated into the martial art of te (hand) and later karate (empty hand). It also spawned the use of the kusarigama and the Kyoketsu Shoge.

Ellis Amdur criticizes in his book Old School: Essays on Japanese Martial Traditions the theory that the kama was derived from a farmer's sickle. Sickle-like weapons like kamayari (sickle spear) however existed since Kamakura period.

== Technique ==
The kama can be used either as a single half or in pairs. Both the point and sharpened edge of the metal blade are called into use, Okinawan kata suggesting that it could also be used to block, trap and disarm an opponent's weapon. The point at which the blade and handle join in the "weapon" model normally has a nook with which a staff can be trapped. The edge of a traditional rice sickle, such as one would purchase from a Japanese hardware store, continues to the handle without a notch, as this is unneeded for its intended use. The hard edge of the blade would be kept razor-sharp to enable efficient cutting of crops, though this is sometimes a cause of training accidents by unskilled wielders, for whom blunt training versions of the weapon are created.

== See also ==
- Okinawan weapons
- Kusarigama
- Kamaitachi
