= Okinawan kusarigama =

Chain and sickle weapon

Okinawan kusarigama is a rare chain (鎖) and sickle (鎌) weapon found in the Okinawan kobudō weapons set. A noted modern practitioner of the weapon was Seike Toma, a student of Chōtoku Kyan and a teacher of Seikichi Odo.

Differing from the kusarigama of the Japanese archipelago in anatomy and techniques, the use and design of the Okinawan kusarigama also varies depending on stylistic preferences or individual choices. The most common design, also known colloquially as "flying kamas", is where the chain (usually replaced with a rope) is attached to the bottom of the handle in the form of a loop. Another variation is where two kama are joined with a rope attached to the bottom of each. There also exists another, reminiscent of Japanese kusarigama but with a sickle smaller in size.

== Sources ==
- Tadashi Yamashita. Kusarigama: The Flashing Art of the Sickle Weapon. Burbank, Cal.: Ohara Publications, 1986. ISBN 978-0-89750-108-8
