= Piton =

Metal tool used in rock climbing

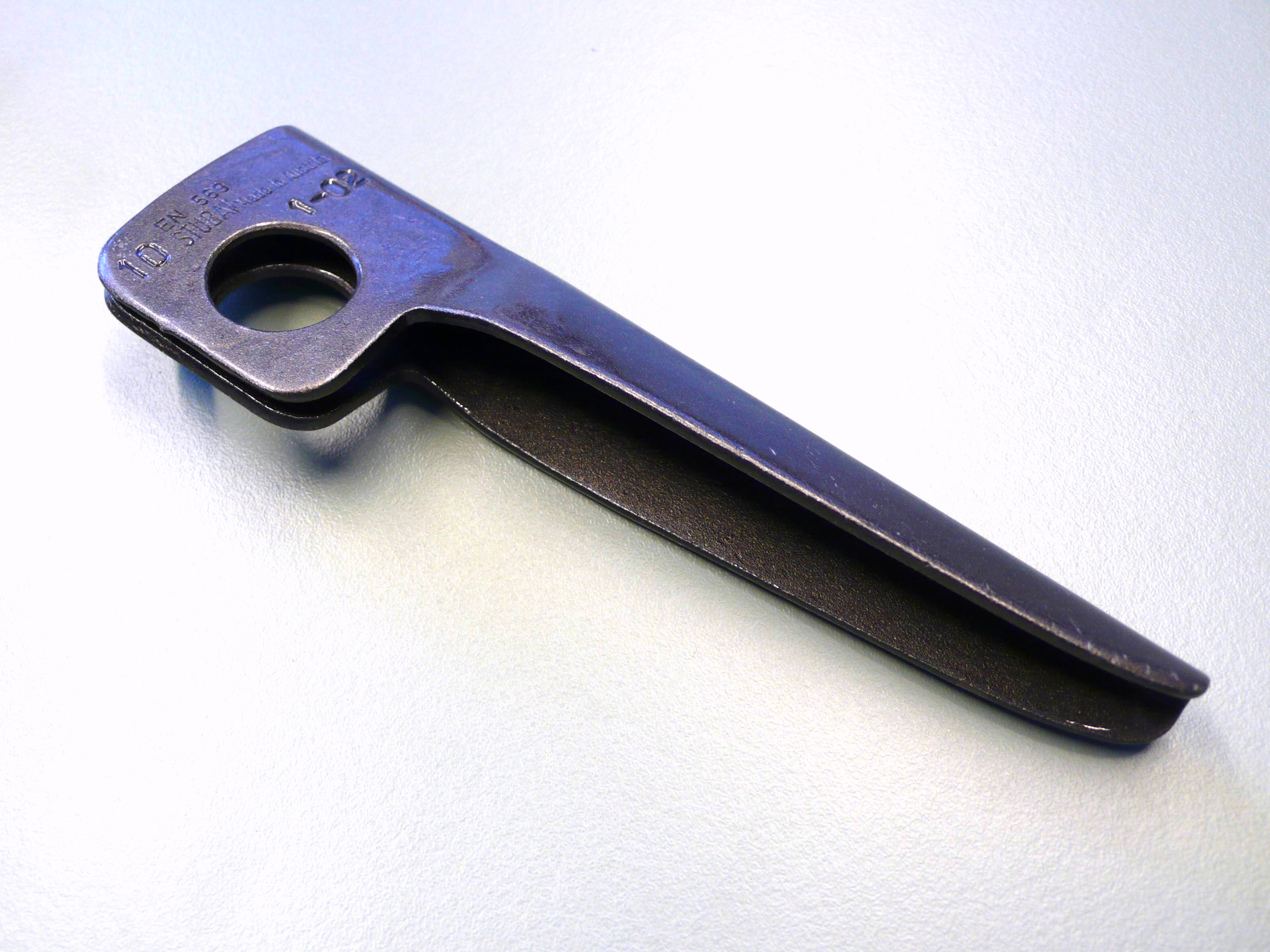

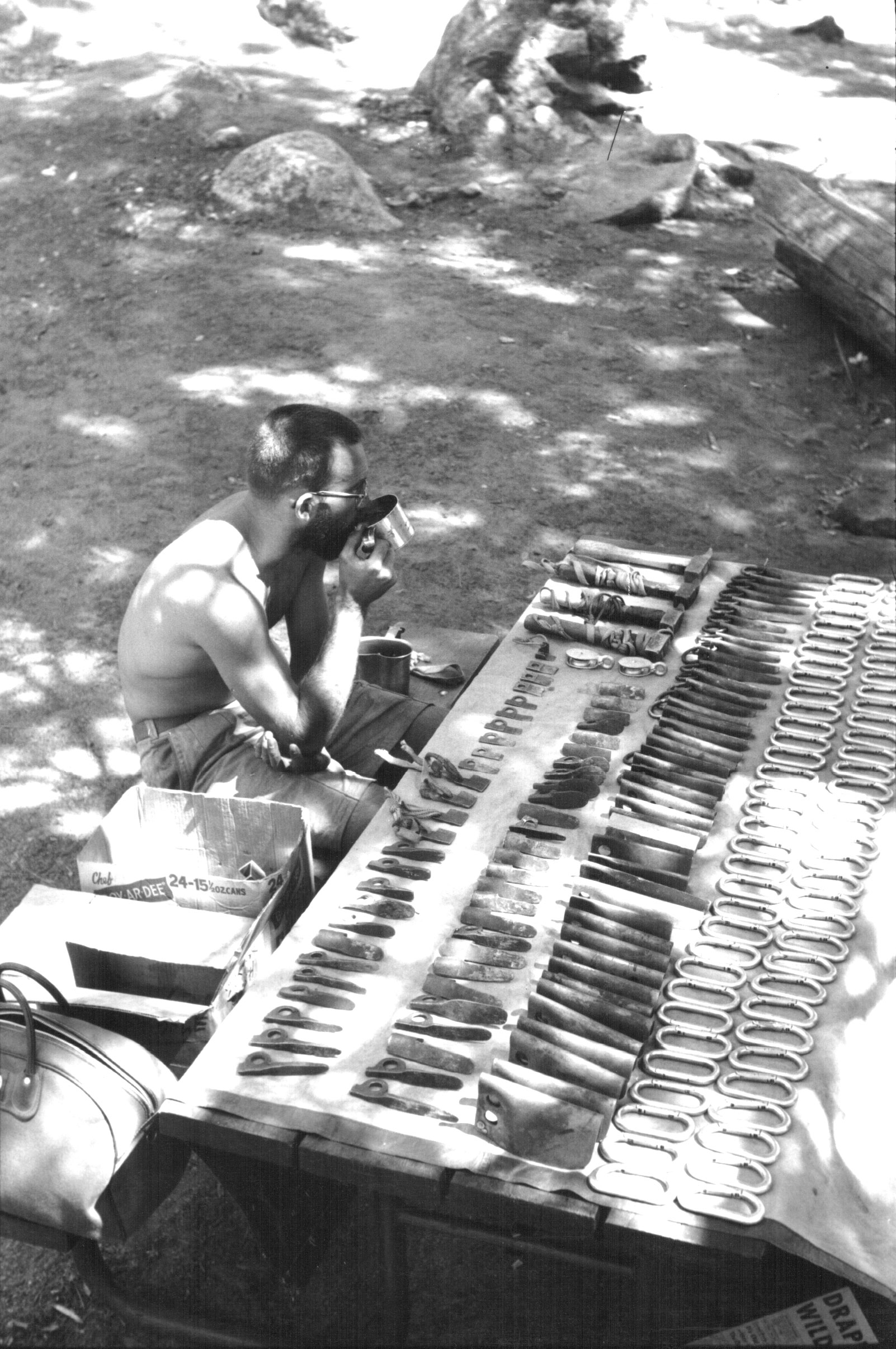
1960s-era pitons, including: knifeblades, lost arrows, bugaboos, ring angles, and bongs

A piton (/ˈpiːtɒn/; also called pin or peg) is a metal spike (usually steel) that is driven into a crack or seam in the climbing surface using a climbing hammer, and which acts as an anchor for protecting the climber from falling or to assist progress in aid climbing. Pitons are equipped with an eye hole or a ring to which a carabiner is attached; the carabiner can then be directly or indirectly connected to a climbing rope.

Pitons were the original form of protection and are still used where there is no alternative, especially in big wall climbing and aid climbing. Repeated hammering and extraction of pitons damage the rock, and climbers who subscribe to the clean climbing ethic avoid their use as much as possible. With the popularization of clean climbing in the 1970s, pitons were largely replaced by faster and easier-to-use clean protection, such as nuts and camming devices. Pitons are still found in place (as "fixed" pitons) on some established free climbing routes, as fixed belay station anchors, in places where nuts or cams do not work; and are used on some hard aid climbs.

== Types ==
Pitons are sized and manufactured to fit a wide range of cracks. From small to large, the most common are:

- RURP (Realized Ultimate Reality Piton) – a tiny piton the size of a postage stamp used in thin, shallow seams. It was designed by Tom Frost and Yvon Chouinard in 1959 and was manufactured by Chouinard Equipment in the 1960s. It is not a strong piece, and is mainly used for aid climbing, although it can feature as protection on extreme free routes (e.g. Rurp The Wild Berserk (E6 6b) at The Brand, Leicestershire, UK).
- Beak – hooking pitons with the ability to hook, which can be placed without a hammer. Known often as Birdbeaks named for Jim Bridwell whose nickname was "The Bird".
- Knifeblade – also known as a bugaboos, are thin straight pitons, that work in thin, deep cracks.
- Lost Arrow – also known as a wedge piton, was designed by John Salathé and Yvon Chouinard (named after Salathé's ascent of Lost Arrow Spire), is a hot-forged, tapered piton for medium-sized cracks.
- Angle – A piton made of steel sheet bent into a "U", "V", or "Z" shape; works well for larger cracks, where the steel deforms elastically as the piton is placed.
- Bong – The largest pitons are angles made from sheet aluminum called a bong, named for the sound they produce while being hammered into place (or dropped). Largely replaced by camming units and nuts (chocks) that perform better and without damaging the rock.
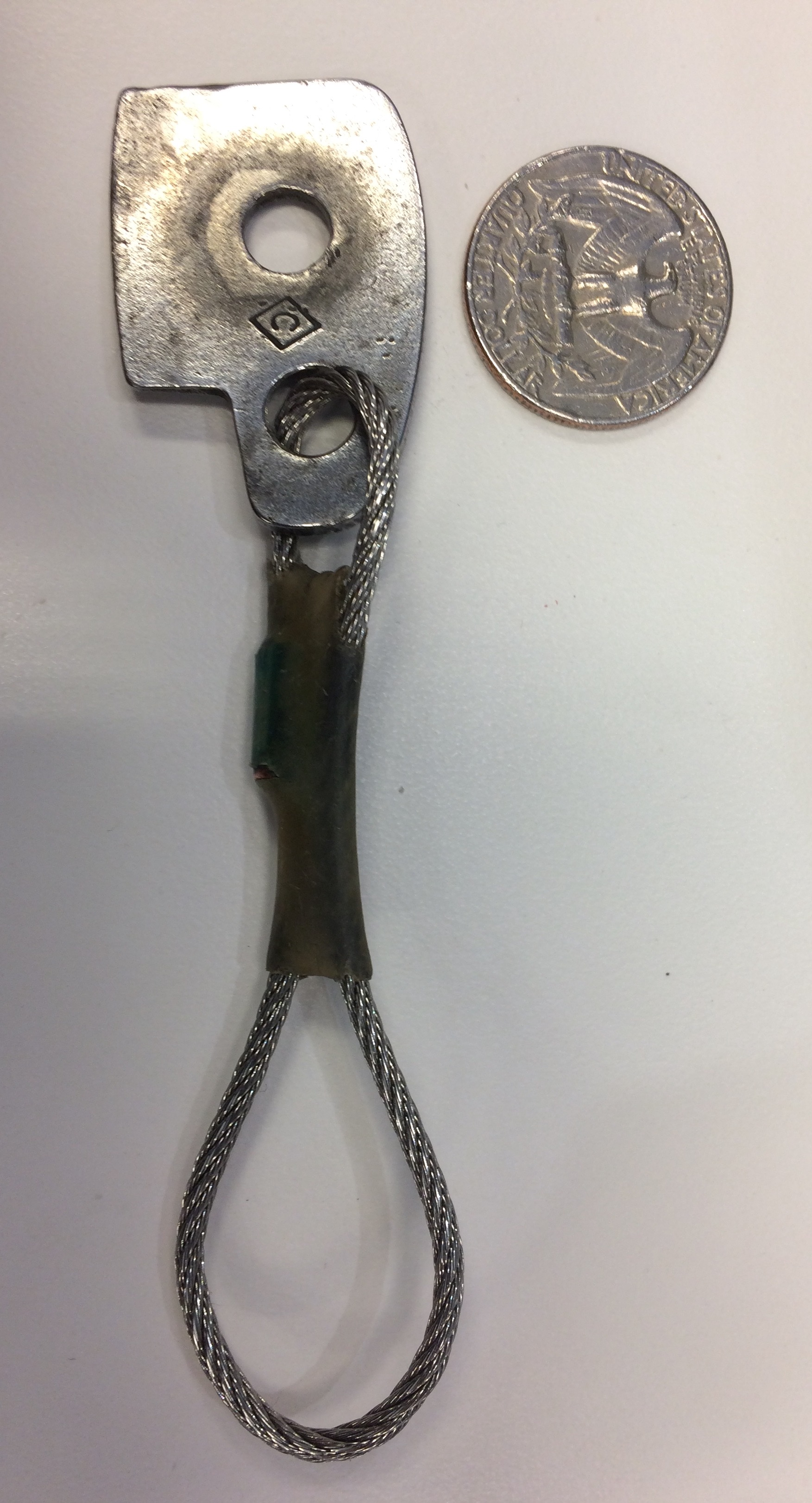
Wired Chouinard RURP

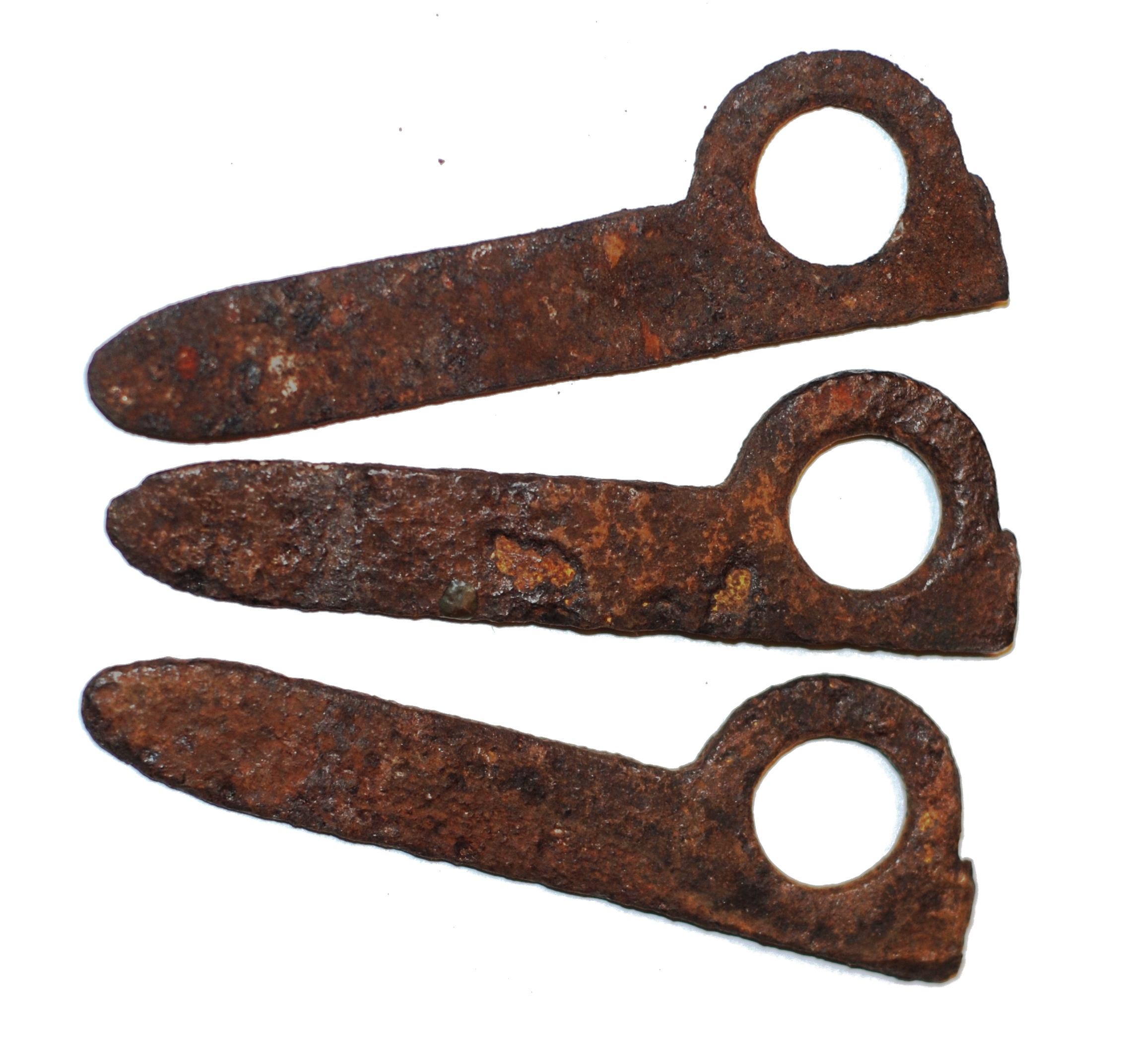
Knifeblade pitons

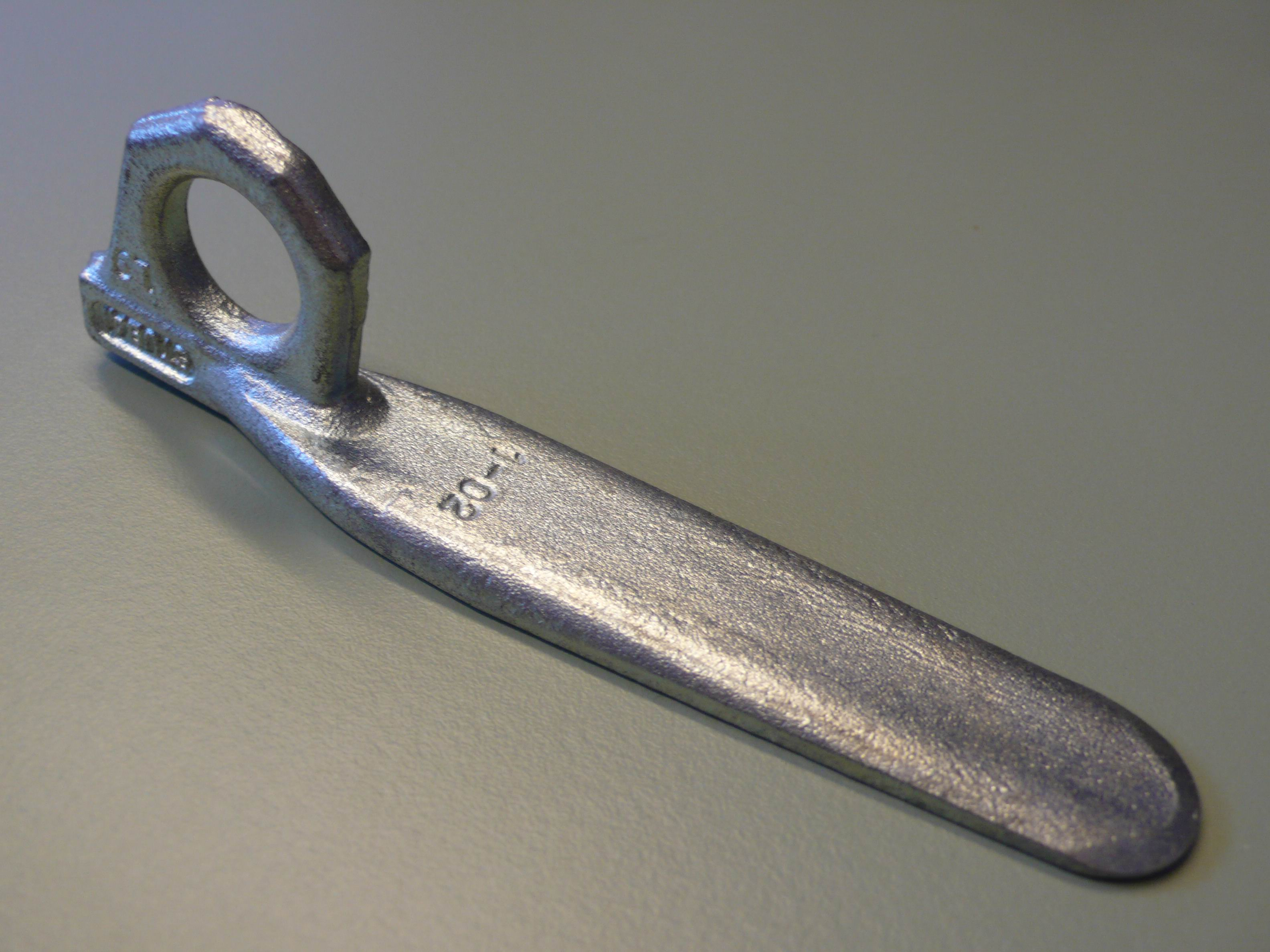
Soft Metal Lost Arrow

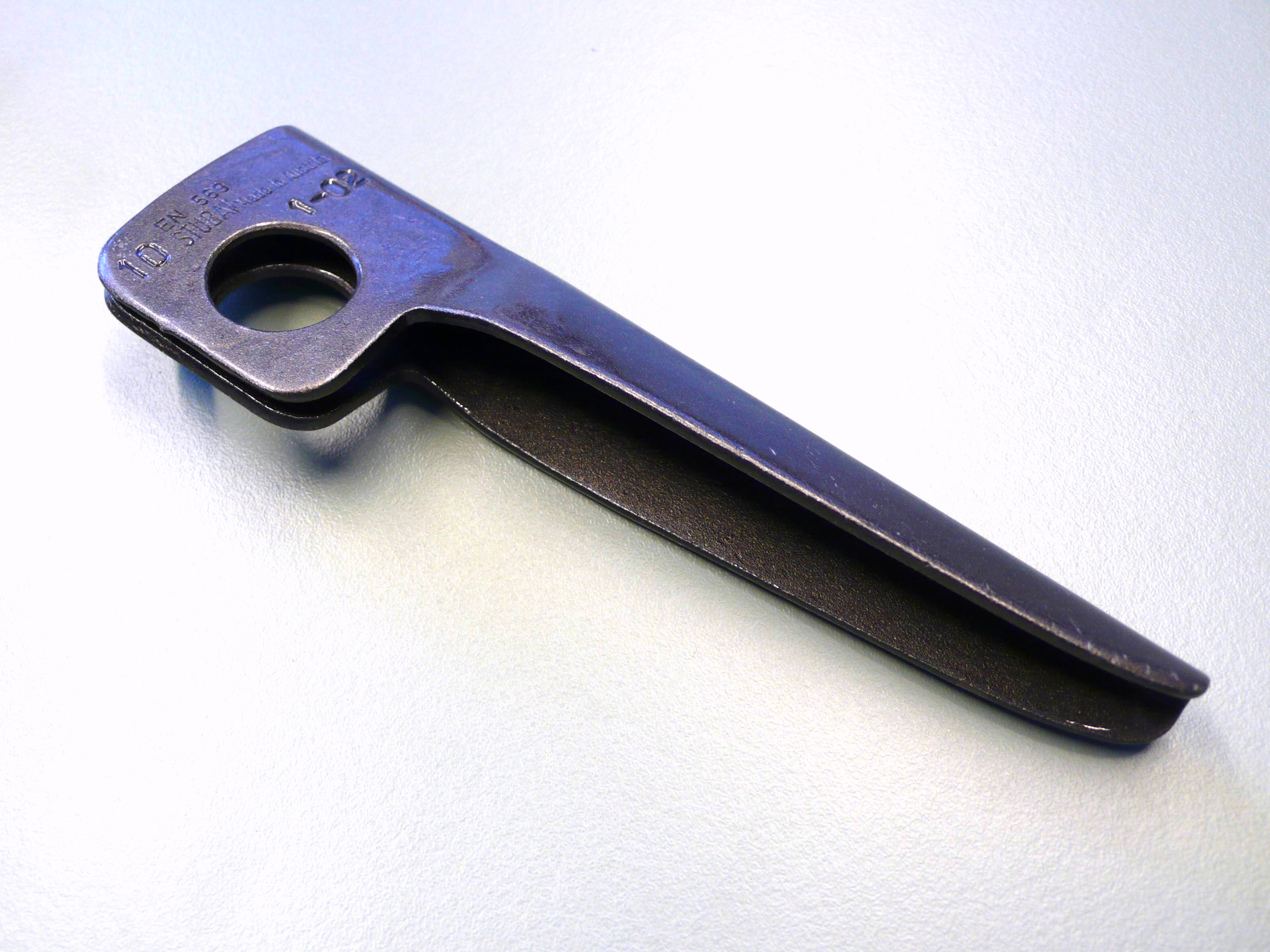
Medium size Angle

== Development ==
Early pitons were made of malleable iron and soft steel and would deform to the shape of a crack when hammered into the rock, which worked well in the irregular cracks found on European limestone. Soft pitons are difficult to remove without damaging the piton, so they were left in place and became fixed anchor points on a climb.

During the exploration of the hard granite in Yosemite Valley in the 1950s and 1960s, it was found that soft pitons did not work well. The long routes developed in Yosemite made it impractical and costly to fix routes, and the soft pitons were not durable enough to be placed and removed more than a few times. Pitons needed to be removed and used again on subsequent pitches, sometimes many times. Leaving gear in place went against the ethics of many climbers. John Salathé pioneered designs using hardened steel which were much tougher than the European pitons. Salathé's pins, which he developed for a climb of the Lost Arrow, resisted deformation and were easier to remove and reuse, and were durable enough to be reused indefinitely.

== See also ==
- Aid climbing
- Big wall climbing
- Bolt
- Copperhead
- Grappling hook
- Kaginawa
- Kyoketsu-shoge
- Rock climbing equipment
