= Plumett AL-52 =

- Type: Pneumatic mortar
- Place of origin: United Kingdom

Service history
- Used by: See users

Production history
- Manufacturer: Plumett Ltd

The AL-52 is a compressed air launcher of British origin manufactured by Plumett Ltd. The AL-52 is capable of launching grappling hooks for the likes of special forces and line throwing. The AL-52 can also be mounted on the ground for launching heavier payloads.

== Users ==
- Ireland - Irish Special Forces
- United Kingdom - UKSF
