= Nesta (charity) =

British nonprofit innovation promotion organization

Coordinates: 51.5165°N 0.1086°W

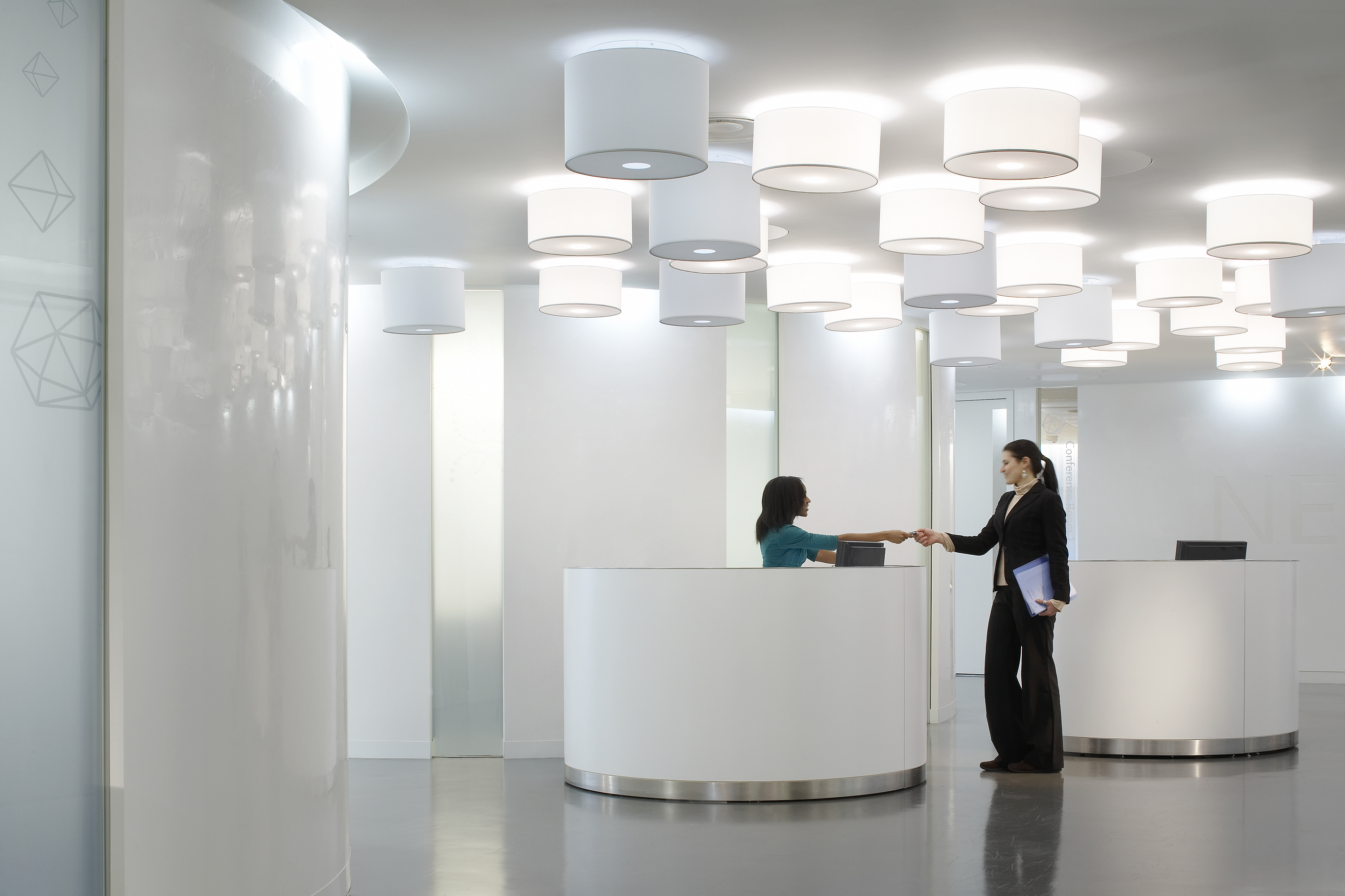
- Nesta headquarters
- Formation: 1998; 28 years ago
- Type: Charity
- Purpose: Innovation
- Headquarters: Victoria Embankment; London, EC4; United Kingdom
- Website: www.nesta.org.uk

Nesta (formerly NESTA, National Endowment for Science, Technology and the Arts) is a British foundation, registered as a charity, which supports innovation.

Nesta was originally funded by a £250 million endowment from the UK National Lottery. The endowment is managed through a trust, and Nesta uses the interest from the trust to meet its charitable objects and to fund and support its projects.

== History ==
NESTA was set up in 1998 by an independent endowment established by an Act of Parliament, the National Lottery Act 1998. Its creation had been a Labour Party manifesto promise. It was originally established as a non-departmental public body and its board of trustees were appointed by the Secretary of State for Culture, Media and Sport. NESTA's first chairman was Lord Puttnam, who had advocated for its creation, while Jeremy Newton was appointed chief executive.

At the onset of operations, substantial funding was provided to NESTA from the proceeds of the recently-established National Lottery; its £200 million fund generated £10 million annually in interest. NESTA sought to use its fund to assist talented individuals in developing their ideas and, where practical to do so, to pursue commercial opportunities for them. By 2001, its grants had been grouped into three distinct programmes, focused on Invention and Innovation, Education, and Fellowships.

In 2002, NESTA was awarded £95 million from the Department for Culture, Media and Sport. In 2003, Sir Chris Powell was appointed as NESTA's new chairman while Jonathan Kestenbaum became chief executive two years later.

In 2006, it was arranged that an additional £75 million of Lottery funding would be provided to NESTA over the following five years. In the mid-to-late 2000s, the organisation's commercial activities were reorganised. Specifically, its work to support individual innovators was deemphasised to focus on national capacity and systems related to innovation. In 2007, the organisation agreed to invest £3 million over three years into the Manchester Innovation Fund.

In October 2010, the coalition government announced that it would transfer NESTA's status from an executive non-departmental public body to a new charitable body. That same year, government funding for the organisation was terminated following the Comprehensive Spending Review 2010.

In April 2012, following the appointment of chief executive Geoff Mulgan, the body became an independent charity, shortening its name to Nesta. In conjunction with this change, Nesta shifted its focus to innovation for public benefit, and expanded its activities in both the public and voluntary sectors.

In April 2013, it was announced that the Behavioural Insights Team (BIT) would be partially privatised as a mutual joint venture. On 5 February 2014, BIT's ownership was split equally between the British government, Nesta, and its employees; to this end, Nesta provided £1.9 million in financing and services.

In 2016, Nesta received a $300,000 grant from the Global Innovation Fund to carry out research on market failures in aquaculture in Bangladesh and India.

Following the appointment of Ravi Gurumurthy as its chief executive in December 2019, Nesta announced their new 10-year strategy in March 2021 which focuses on three core missions: sustainability, health inequalities and the education attainment gap.

In February 2024, Nesta publicly called for the British government to change how it operates and funds various programmes to focus on multidisciplinary teams, pursuing continuous improvement, and avoiding the front-loading of funding before viability and value have been proven.

== Operations ==
Nesta and the Nesta Trust are registered as charities in England and Wales, and Nesta is registered in Scotland.

Following Nesta’s new 2030 strategy, Nesta primarily operates in the following three areas:

- A Sustainable Future: Nesta’s programmatic focus is on reducing household emissions by 28 per cent versus 2019 levels, helping to ensure the UK is on track to reach zero by 2048. They will also explore how to improve the UK’s productivity levels.
- A Healthy Life: Nesta is focusing on increasing long-term health whilst narrowing health inequalities. In order to halve the UK’s obesity rate by 2030, Nesta is primarily focusing on tackling food environments. Their secondary focus is expanding the evidence bank on the link between loneliness and ill health.
- A Fairer Start: Nesta is focusing on improving outcomes for low-income children. Nesta aims that, by 2030, the UK will have eliminated the school readiness gap between those born into deprivation and their peers, with similar gains at age 16 among students receiving free school meals.

== Management ==
Ed Richards chairs the organisation. Ravi Gurumurthy is the organisation's chief executive.

== See also ==
- Behavioural Insights Team
- Co-production (approach)
- Hidden innovation
