= Yamada Shinryukan =

Japanese swordsman

Yamada Shinryukan was a semi-famous swordsman following the Edo period of the 17th century of Japan. Shinryukan was a noted teacher of the kusarigama (Which consists of a kama with a long chain with a weight at one end attached to it.) who killed many rival swordsmen. Shinryukan was finally defeated when he fought against the swordsman Araki Mataemon.
