= Hidden innovation =

Innovation not recognized by traditional indicators

Hidden innovation or invisible innovation refers to innovation that is not captured or recognised by traditional indicators such as research and development (R&D) spending or number of patents. The term generally refers to innovation that takes place outside science & technology sectors, which are the primary sectors which invest in formal R&D and patents. For example, although technological innovations are often developed in the oil & gas sector through oil exploration activities, these innovations are unaccounted for in innovation metrics because oil exploration is not counted as formal R&D. Other types of innovation, including social innovation, can be classed as hidden innovation.

Although originally coined in the 90s by Diana Hicks and Sylvan Katz in their research on the hidden research system involving hospital researchers, and Mike Hopkins research on genetic testing within the UK healthcare system, the concept of hidden innovation has most recently been promoted by NESTA, in their "Innovation Gap" Report, published October 2006. A later report, called "Hidden innovation", further expands on the concept and identifies four types of hidden innovation:

1. Innovation that is the same or similar to activities that are measured by traditional indicators, but which is excluded from measurement.
2. Innovation without a major scientific/technological basis, such as innovation in organizational forms or business models.
3. Innovation created from the novel combination of existing technologies and processes.
4. Locally developed, small-scale innovations that take place 'under the radar' and are therefore unrecognised or accounted for.
