= Howard le Peton =

Welsh-born Irish cricketer (1895–1981)

Personal information
- Full name: Howard Guerin le Peton
- Born: 19 January 1895; Pwllheli, Caernarvonshire, Wales
- Died: 19 September 1981 (aged 86); Wisbech, Cambridgeshire, England
- Batting: Right-handed

Domestic team information
- Years: Team
- 1921: Ireland

Career statistics
Competition	First-class
Matches	1
Runs scored	16
Batting average	16.00
100s/50s	–/–
Top score	16
Catches/stumpings	–/–
- Source: Cricinfo, 1 January 2022

Howard Guerin le Peton (19 January 1895 in Pwllheli, Wales – 19 September 1981 in Wisbech, Cambridgeshire, England) was a Welsh-born Irish cricketer. A right-handed batsman, he played just once for the Ireland cricket team, a first-class match against Scotland in August 1921.

He served with the Royal Dublin Fusiliers during the First World War.
