= Kaginawa =

Japanese climbing tool

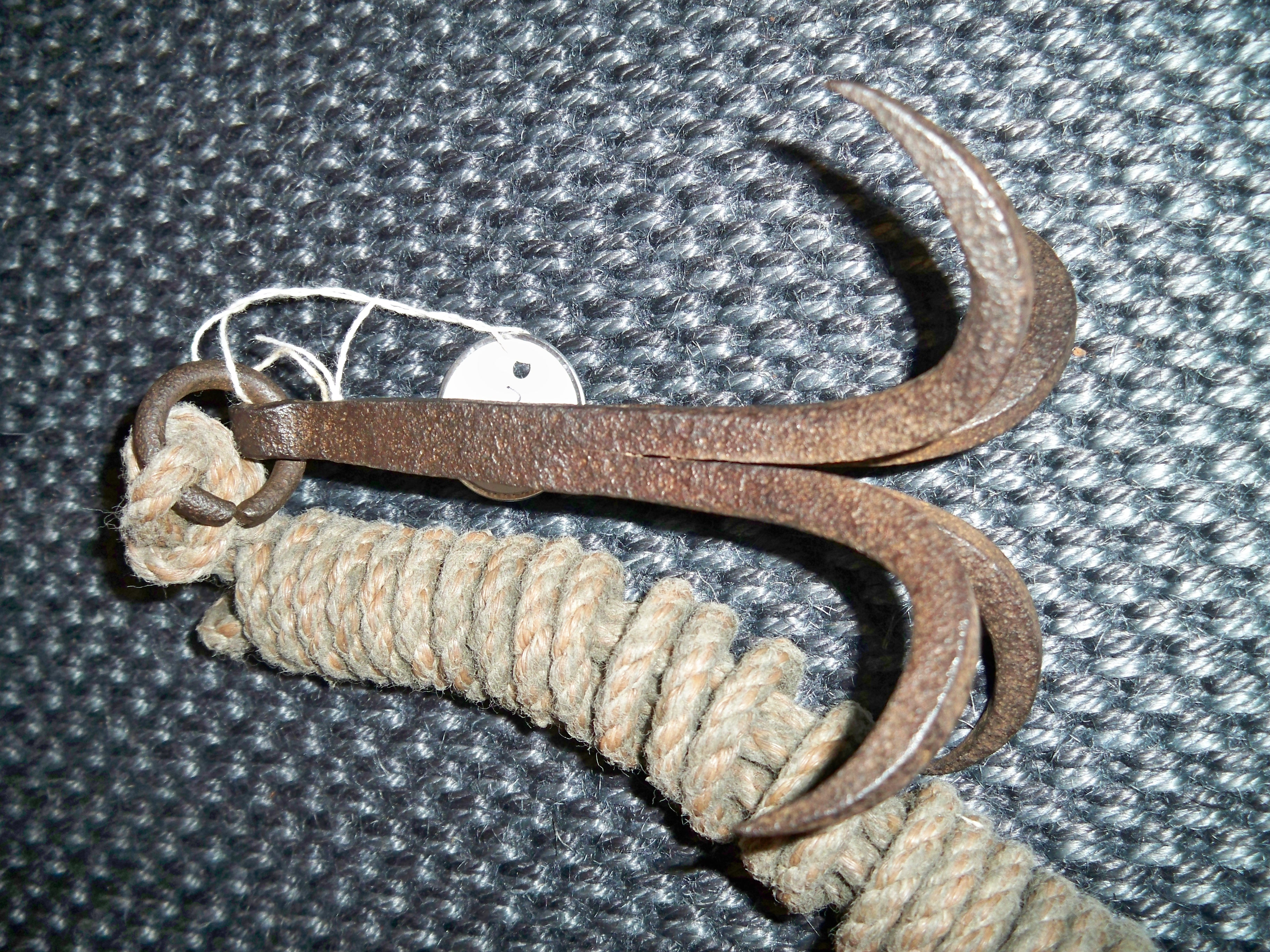
Antique Japanese iron kaginawa climbing hook

Kaginawa (鈎縄 or 鉤縄; lit. "hook-rope") is a type of grappling hook used as a tool in feudal Japan by the samurai class, their retainers, foot soldiers and reportedly by ninja. Kaginawa has several configurations, from one to four hooks. The hook would be attached to a rope of varying length; this was then used to scale a rather large wall, to secure a boat, or for hanging up armor and other equipment during the night. Kaginawa were regularly used during various sieges of miscellaneous castles. The rope was attached to a ring on one end which could be used to hang it from a saddle.

== See also ==
- Kyoketsu-shoge
- Piton
