= Grappling hook =

Device with multiple hooks attached to a rope

Grappling hook / Grapnel
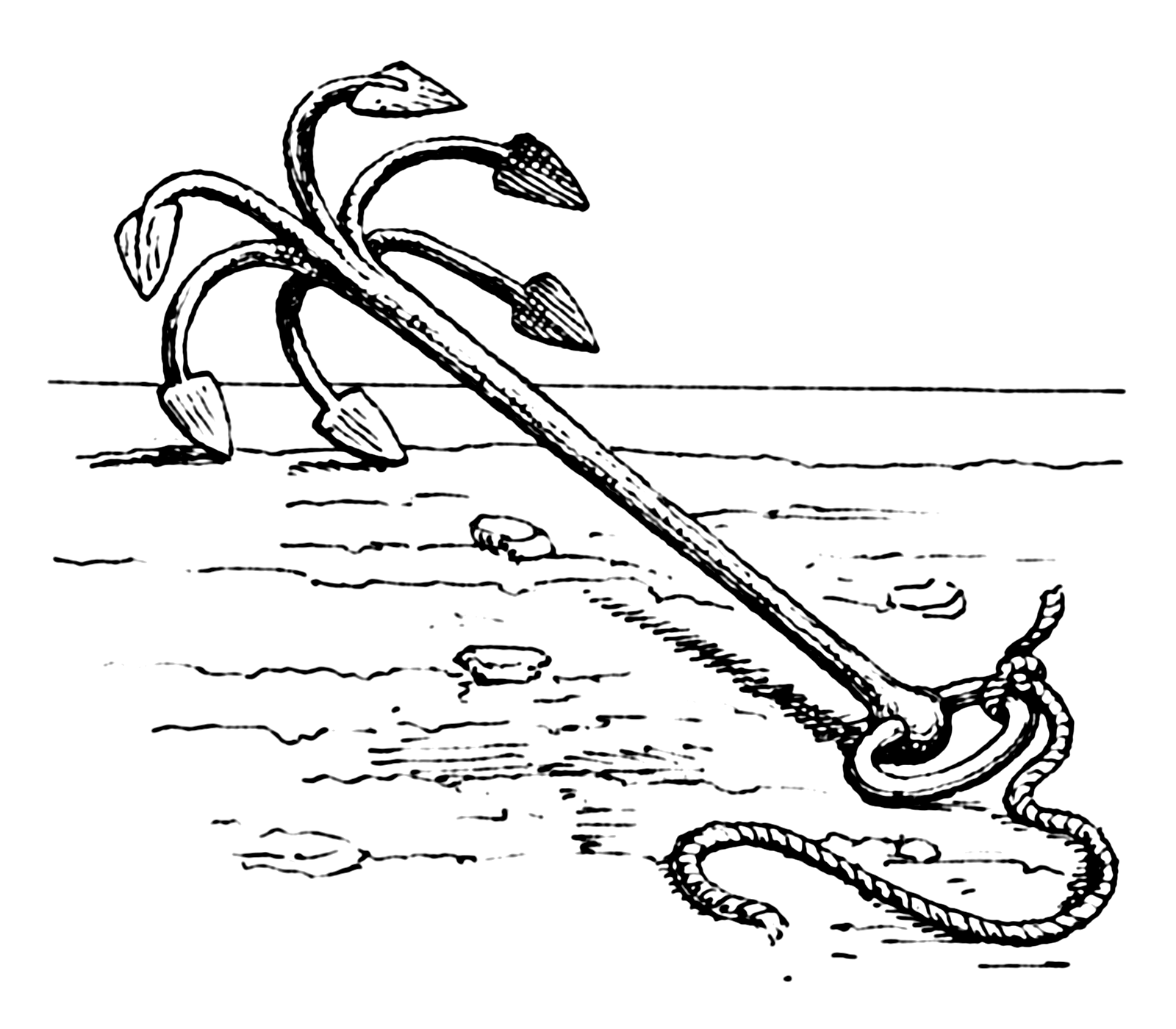
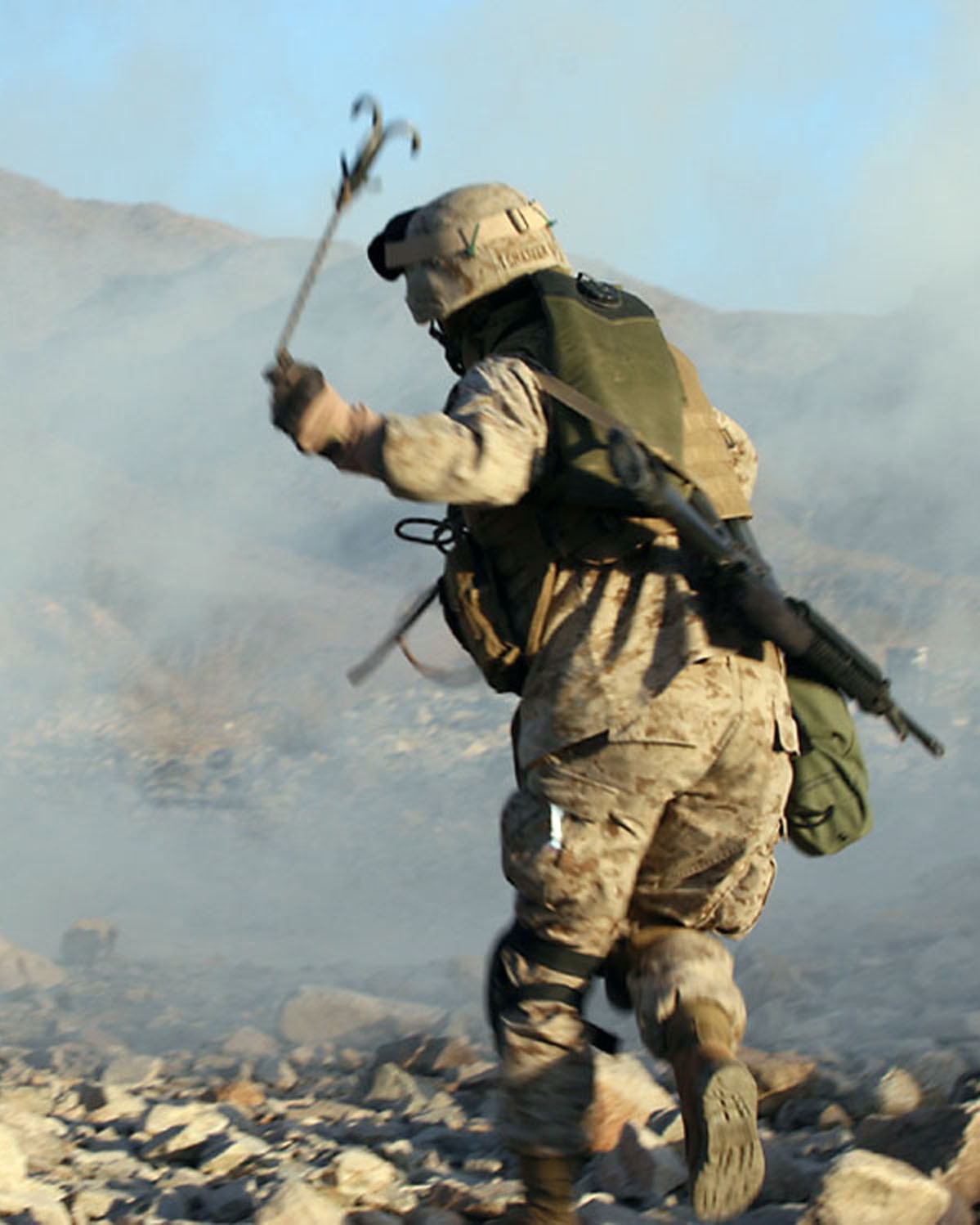
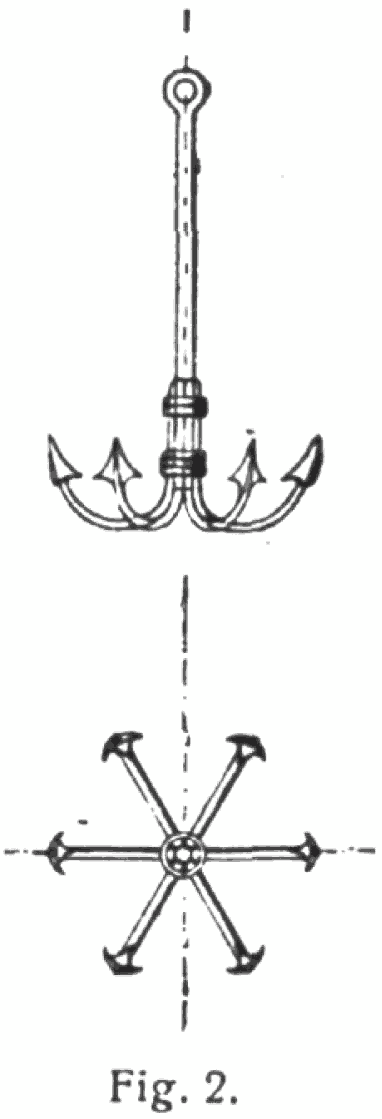
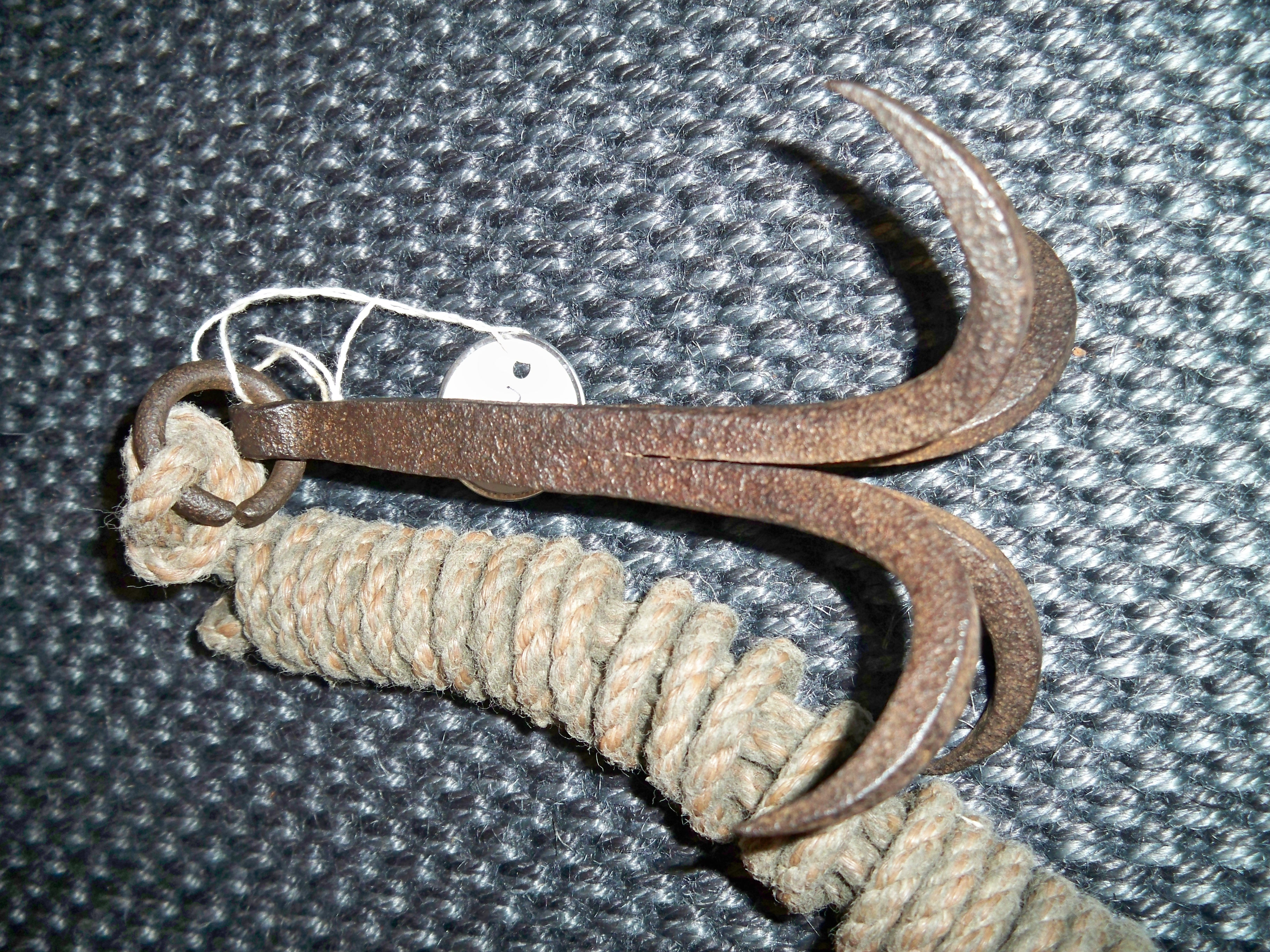
- Upper left: Sketch of a boarding grapnel
- Upper right: Soldier swinging grappling hook
- Lower left: Six-hooked boarding grapnel
- Lower right: Feudal Japanese grappling hook: kaginawa

A grappling hook, or grapnel, is a drag-looking device intended for grappling onto something. It typically has multiple hooks (known as claws or flukes) attached to a rope or cable; it is thrown, dropped, sunk, projected, or fastened directly by hand to where at least one hook may catch and hold on to objects. Generally, grappling hooks are used to temporarily secure one end of a rope. They may also be used to dredge for submerged objects.

The device was invented by the Romans in approximately 260 BC. The grappling hook was originally used in Naval warfare to catch ships rigging so that they could be boarded.

== Design ==
A common design has a central shaft with a hole ("eye") at the shaft base to attach the rope, and three or four equally spaced hooks at the end, arranged so that at least one is likely to catch on some protuberance of the target. Some modern designs feature folding hooks to resist unwanted attachment.

=== Grapple gun ===
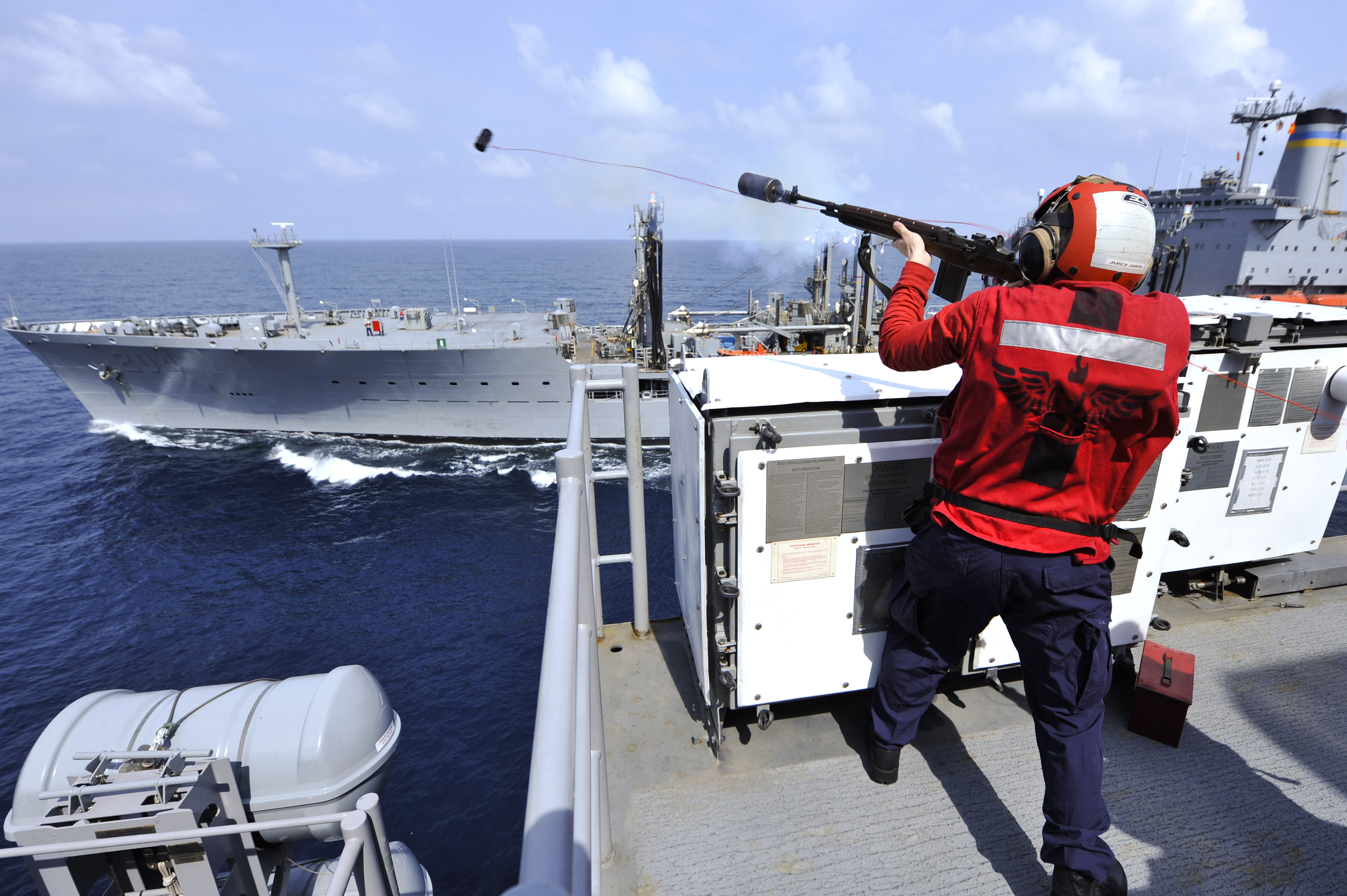
Boarding shot line fired from a rifle with muzzle cup

Most grappling hooks are thrown by hand, but some are propelled via compressed air, gunpowder, or rockets, either from dedicated grapple guns, or line throwers, such as the Plumett AL-52, or from conventional weapons, such as mortars, or guns with the appropriate muzzle device.

== Applications ==
=== Entring (boarding) ===
Traditionally, grappling hooks have been a tool of naval boarding, used to grapple the rigging or railing of enemy ships, and allow boarding parties to climb over. This tactic also transcends onto land, where it is used to climb over obstacles and for entering buildings.

Historically there have been big boarding grapnels, swung from the rigging of ships, also known as boarding drags (German: Enterdregge, Swedish: änterdragg).

Grappling hooks were used by soldiers at the D-Day landings to aid in climbing the cliffs at the Normandy beaches. Some were rocket-propelled and launched from mortars.

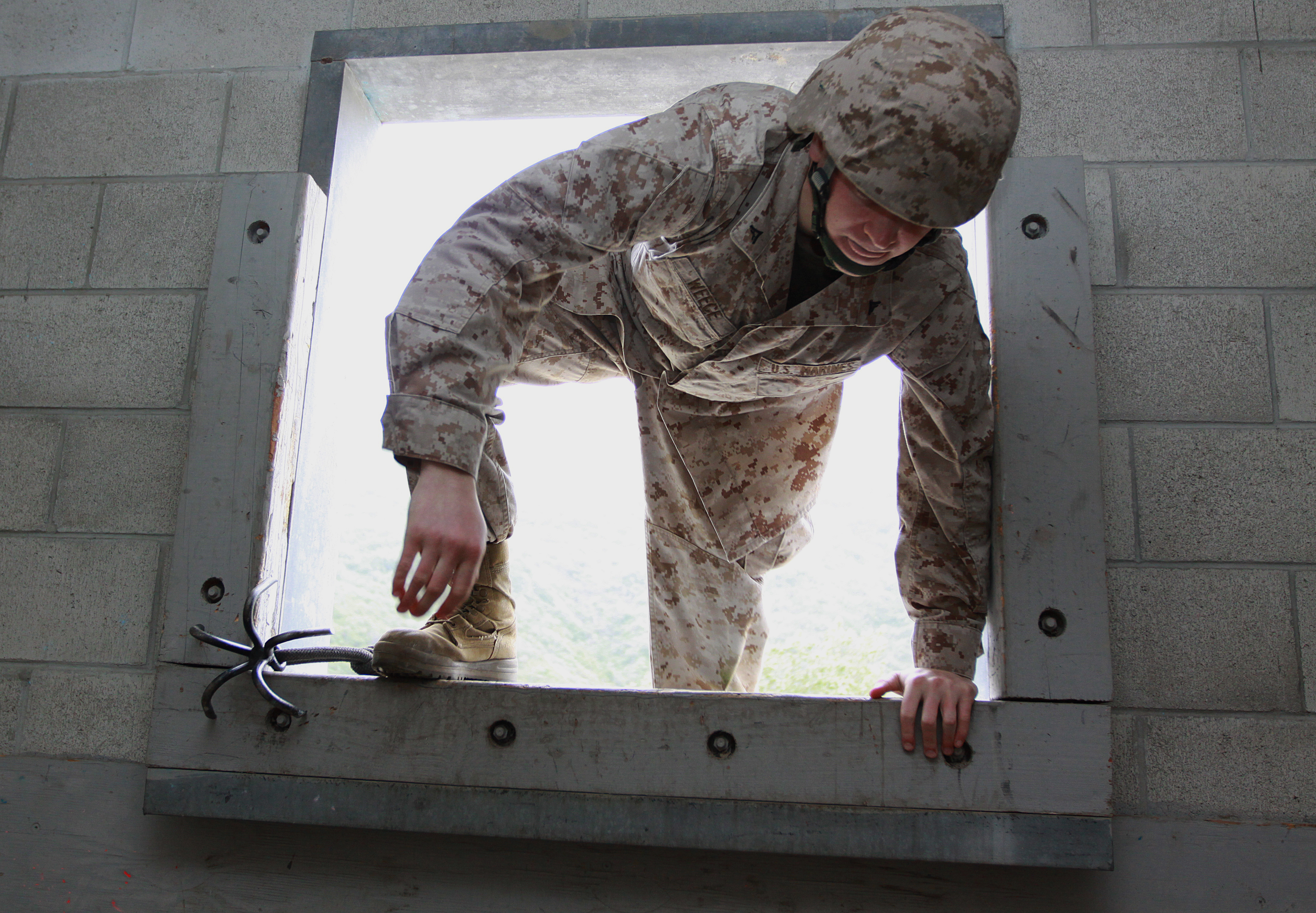
Window entry via grappling hook

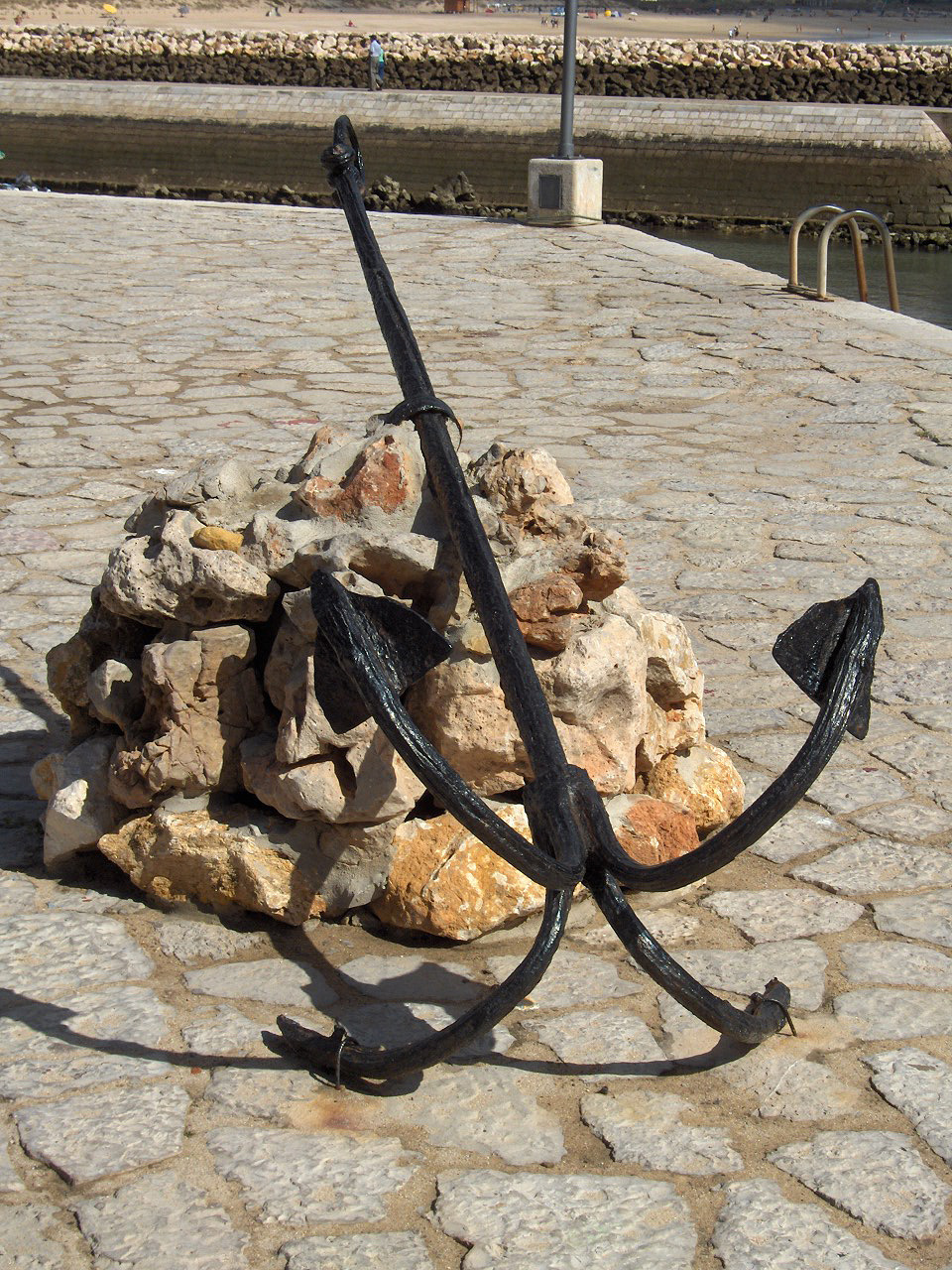
Large boarding drag

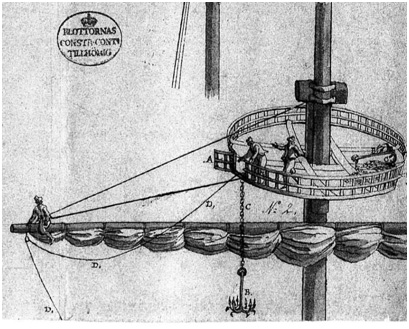
Illustration from a Swedish manual for a boarding drag (1698–1715)

=== Clearance ===
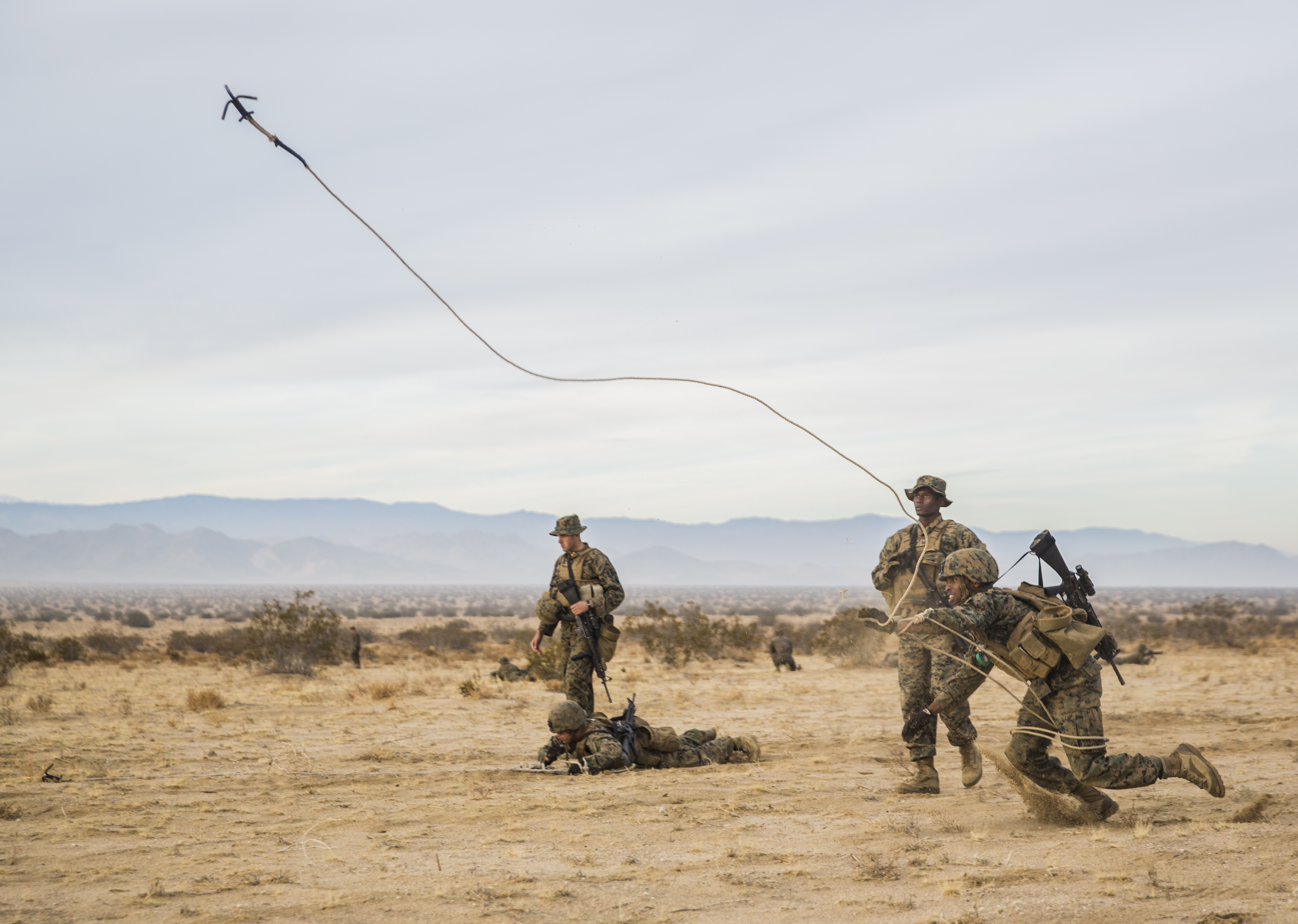
A hook being used for demining

Grappling hooks are used by combat engineers to breach tactical obstacles. When used as such, the grappling hook is launched in front of an obstacle and dragged backwards to detonate tripwire-fused land mines, and can be hooked on wire obstacles and pulled to set off booby traps on the wire. A grapnel can clear up to 99% of the trip-wires in a single pass.

The rifle-launched grapnel (LGH), a single-use grappling hook placed on the end of an M4/M16 rifle, is used for this purpose. A crossbow-launched version has also been produced.

=== Snagging ===
In World War I, the Russian pilot Alexander Kazakov once unsuccessfully attempted to use a grappling hook to bring down a German spy plane.

During World War II British and German ships towed grappling hooks in the hope of snagging or damaging enemy submarines, a tactic also employed by the Japanese.

=== Maritime ===
As well as the grapnel anchor, grapnels are used in the removal and repair of subsea cables. Large cable layer ships drag huge grapnels across the seabed until they snag a cable. They typically have four evenly spaced hooks.

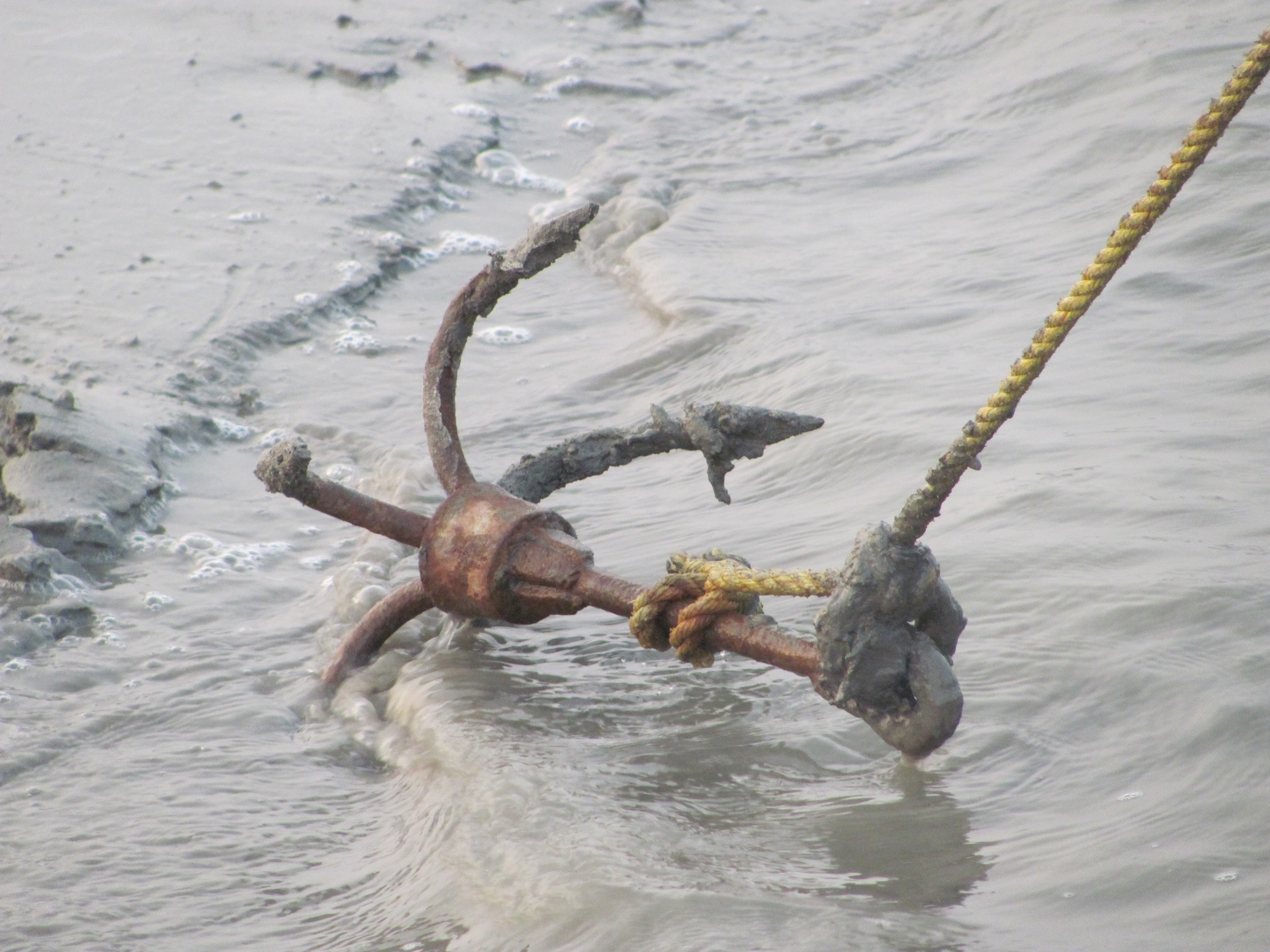
Grapnel anchor

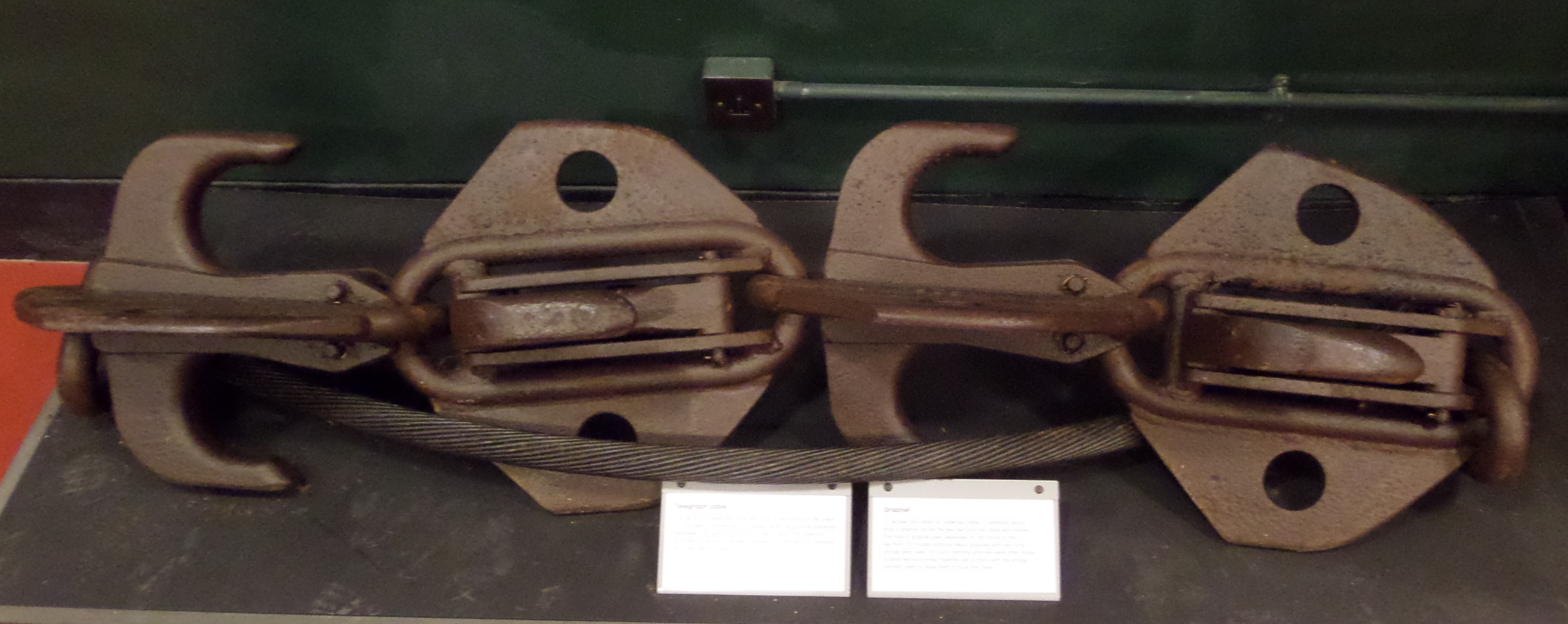
A chain grapnel – used to recover a cable from the seabed

== In popular culture ==
Grappling hooks, grapple guns, and their many variants have been a staple in many video games, such as Bionic Commando, Assassin's Creed and as a signature tool in the Tomb Raider series; as well as some cartoons like Phineas and Ferb. A particularly well known use of grappling hooks in video games is the Hookshot, from the popular Nintendo series, The Legend of Zelda. First appearing in the 1992 title A Link to the Past, it went on to become a staple of numerous games in the series. A grappling hook is the main transportation mode throughout the Just Cause video game franchise.

== See also ==
- Dragon beard hook
- Grapple (tool)
- Kaginawa
- Kyoketsu-shoge
- Line thrower
