= Ellis Amdur =

American writer

Ellis Amdur (born March 27, 1952, in Pittsburgh, Pennsylvania) is a writer, an American practitioner of martial arts and as of 2024, retired crisis intervention trainer. He has dedicated much of his life to studying and teaching classical Japanese martial traditions. He has published a number of books on martial arts, on crisis intervention, hostage negotiation, and fiction.

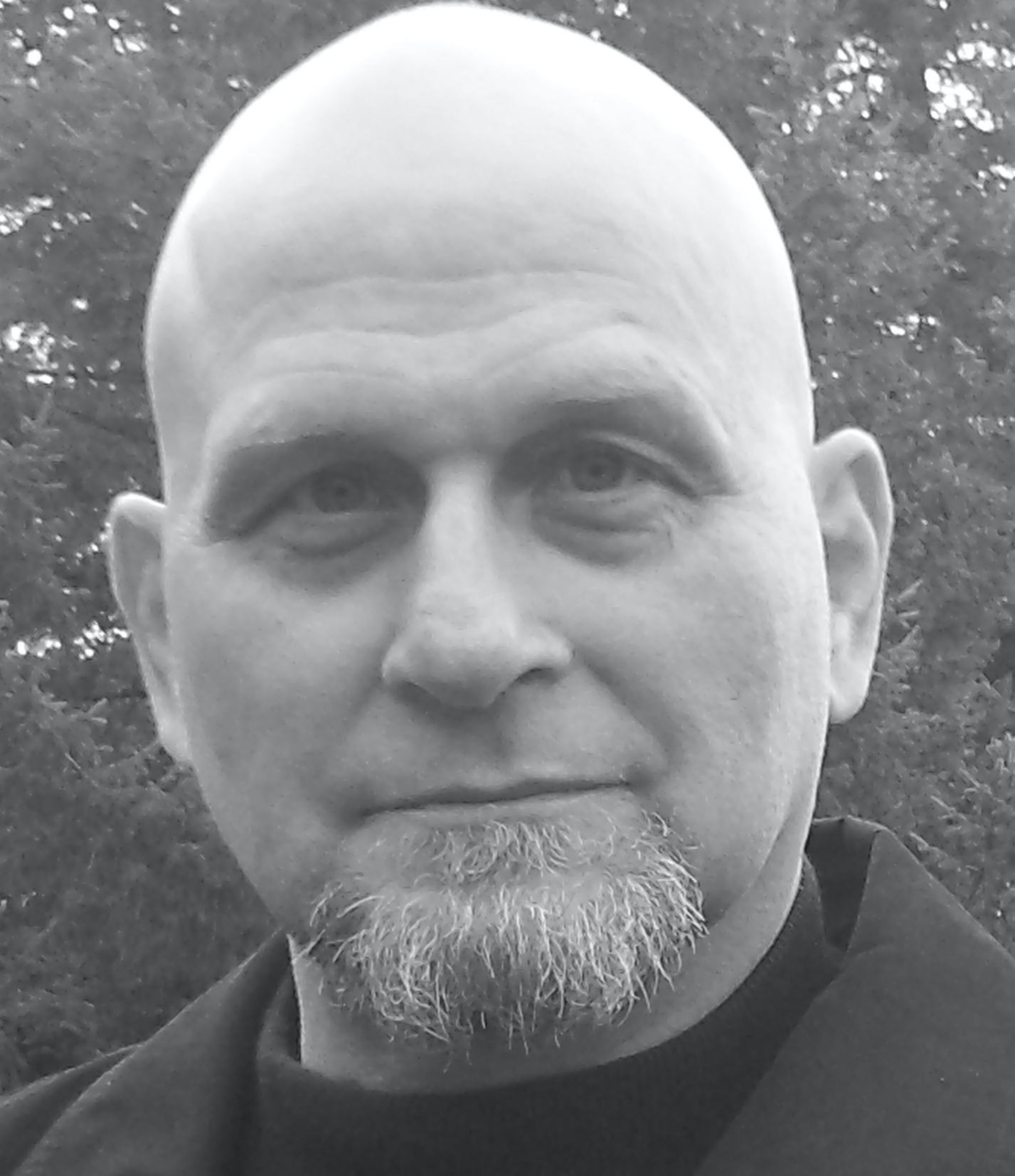

== Career ==
Amdur began his study of martial arts in 1968, learning karate and traditional Chinese arts. He started training in aikido in 1973, and after moving to New York, lived in Terry Dobson and Ken Nisson’s Bond Street Dojo. He also started training daily at Yamada Yoshimitsu's New York Aikikai school of aikido. After gaining a degree in psychology, Amdur traveled to Japan in 1976. He continued training in aikido there at the World Aikido Headquarters, and also at the dojos of Kuwamori Yasunori and Kuroiwa Yoshio. He regards Kuroiwa as his most significant influence in aikido. He entered the Tenshin Bukō-ryū Heihō and Araki-ryū, two traditional koryu in the mid-1970's. He is shihan (full instructor) in both these arts, one of only a few non-Japanese to attain teaching licenses in any koryu. He has also studied judo, Muay Thai and xingyiquan. In recent years, Amdur has continued his training in several areas: a study of 'internal strength' paradigms, as suited to use within traditional Japanese combative arts; Arrestling, a mixed martial art specifically for law enforcement, created by Don Gulla; Amdur's 'new-old' development, Taikyoku Araki-ryu in which, in collaboration with established groups of expert martial artists, one or more 'modules' of Araki-ryu are studied in depth, and applied to the environment where the particular group functions (competitive grappling and law enforcement being two examples).

Parallel to his martial arts career, Amdur is a pioneer in the field of crisis intervention. Amdur developed and taught courses on tactical communication for law enforcement and corrections as well as social services and businesses. He has trained nearly one thousand agencies worldwide and authored numerous profession-specific books on these topics, blending his real-world experiences with psychological insight and rigorous research. His work is distinctive for weaving personal anecdotes—often intense or unconventional—with well-grounded principles.

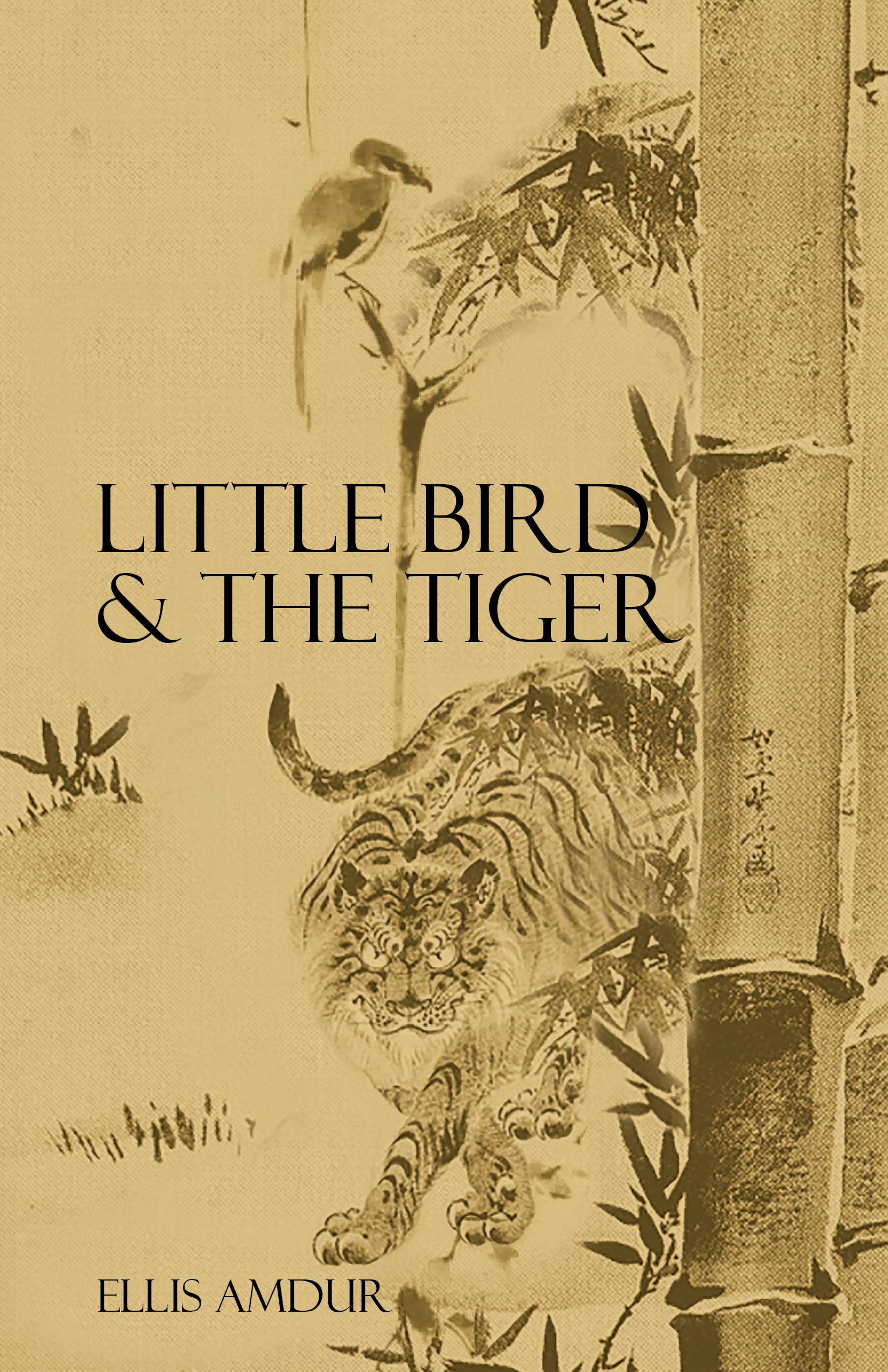

== Works ==
Amdur is the author of several books on the martial arts (Dueling With O-Sensei, Hidden in Plain Sight, Old School, The Phenomenologist, Roots Still Cracking Rock, ) as well as nineteen profession-specific books on crisis intervention, crisis negotiation, hospice social work and the art of psychotherapy, which are published under his own Edgework Publishing imprint. In addition, he has also published four works of fiction:

- Girl with the Face of the Moon - WINNER: First Place in the Mystery/Thriller category of the 2023 Writer's Digest 11th Annual Self-Published E-Book Awards & READER'S VIEW: First Place Award - 2023/24 Historical Fiction Classic
- Lost Boy
- Little Bird & The Tiger - WINNER: First Place in the Mainstream/Literary Fiction category of 2023 Writer’s Digest Self-Published Book Awards
- Along with Neal Stephenson, Charles C. Mann, and Mark Teppo, the graphic novel, Cimarronin.
