= Kyoketsu-shoge =

Double-edged Japanese blade

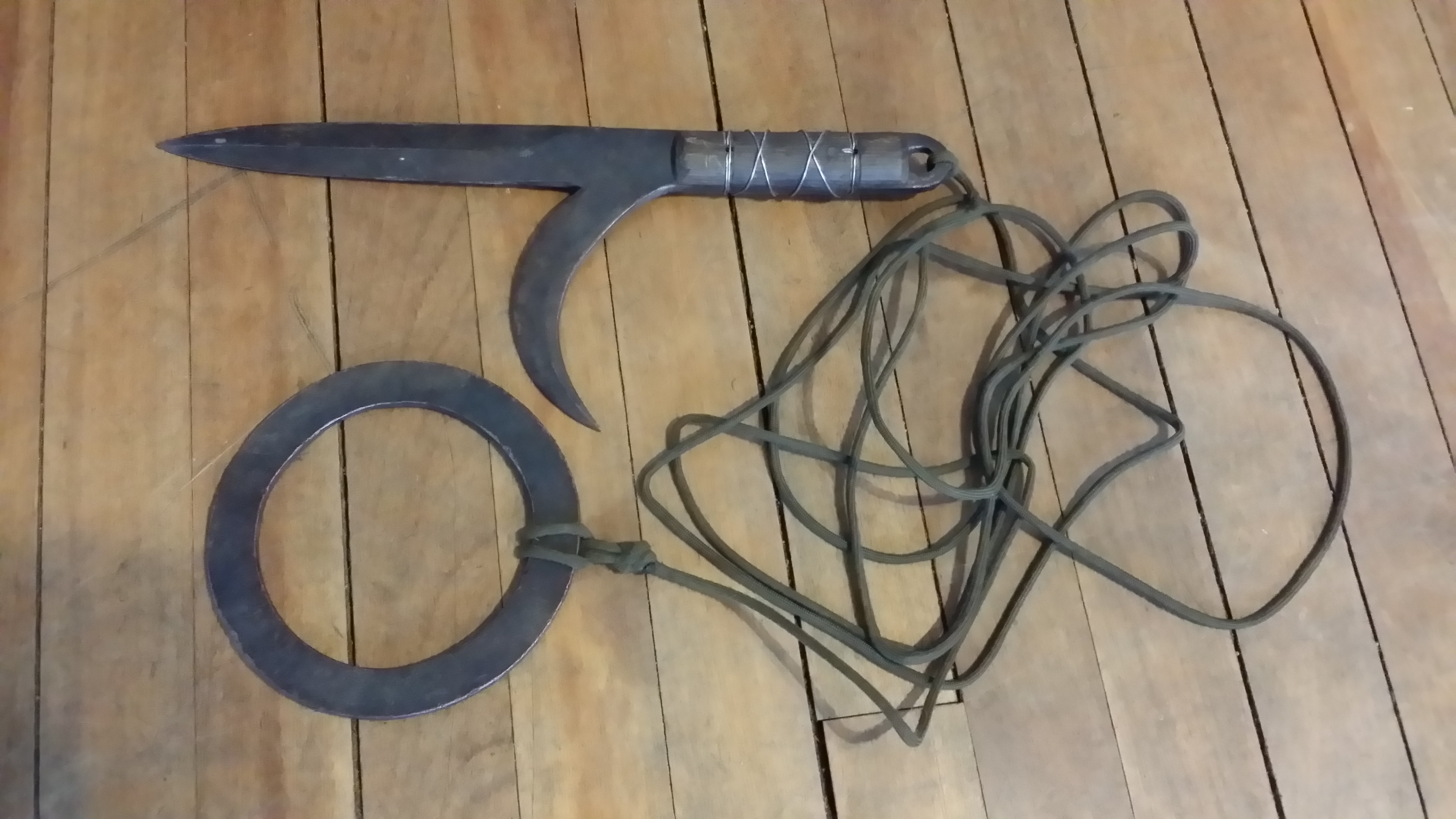

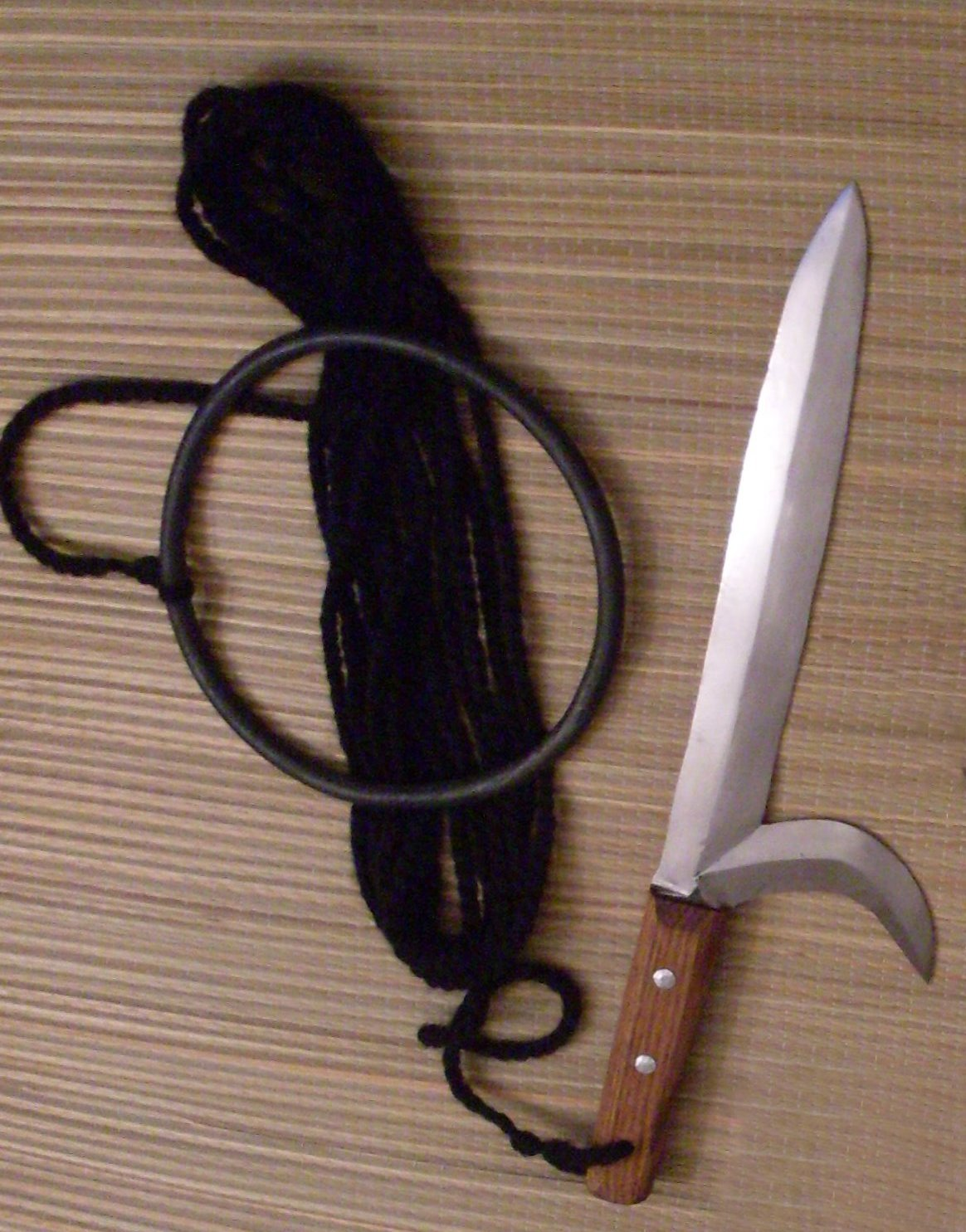
Kyoketsu-shoge

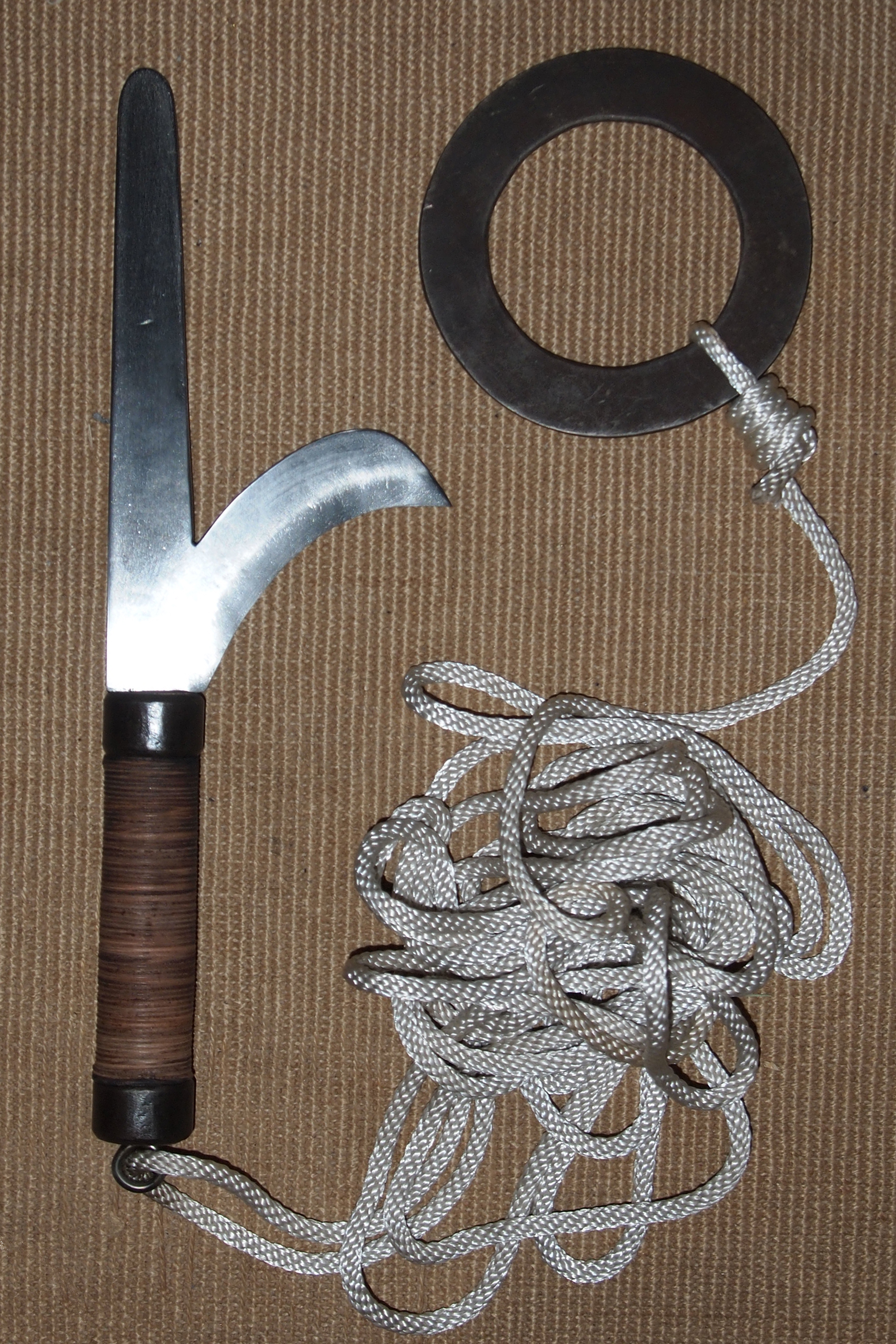
Kyoketsu-shoge

The kyoketsu-shoge (Japanese: 距跋渉毛; lit. "long-distance wandering hair") is a double-edged blade, with another curved blade attached near the hilt at a 45–60 degree angle. This is attached to approximately 10 to 18 feet (3–5 m) of rope, chain, or hair which then ends in a large metal ring. Likely used by ninja of the Iga province, it is thought to be a forerunner to the later more widely known kusarigama (sickle and chain). Ninja were often recruited from the class of rural peasantry who resided on remote farmland, and the tool's resemblance to farming equipment and high versatility gave it many benefits in stealth combat.

The kyoketsu-shoge has a wide range of uses. The blade could be used for slashing as well as thrusting stabs. The chain or cord, sometimes made from human hair or horsehair for strength and resiliency, could be used for climbing, ensnaring an enemy, binding an enemy and many such other uses. The long range of the weapon combined a cutting tool along with the capability to strike or entangle an enemy at what the user perceived to be a "safe" distance out of the way. When skilled with this weapon, it could be used to entangle a sword and pull it from an opponent's hands, rendering them harmless. The kyoketsu-shoge cord and ring was sometimes used to wrap around an enemy's legs and trip them.

Typically the round ring was flat rather than round in cross section to provide a firmer grip and a more sturdy frame, as the ring was also used for strikes and deflective blows in use. This tool was also used as a climbing aid, and it could be thrown and lodged in corners.

== Legality ==
In the Republic of Ireland, the "kyoketsu shoge, being a length of rope, cord, wire or chain fastened at one end to a hooked knife" is prohibited under the Firearms and Offensive Weapons Act 1990.

== In popular culture ==
- In the cartoon show G.I. Joe: Renegades, a modified chain version was used by Jinx and Storm Shadow during “The Return of the Arashikage, Parts 1 and 2”
- In the movie Ninja Assassin, a modified chain version of this weapon is used as Raizo's main weapon.
- In the movie Game of Death II, Lee Chen-kwok (李振國) / Bobby Lo (盧博比) uses one to cross a laser beam floor.
- In the first season of Netflix series Daredevil, the blade is used with great skill by the Japanese warrior Nobu.
- In the manga Spirit Circle, Fone uses this weapon to attack Stona.

== See also ==
- List of martial arts weapons
