= Chain weapon =

Weapon made from objects attached to a chain

A chain weapon is a weapon made of one or more heavy objects attached to a chain, sometimes with a handle. The flail was one of the more common types of chain weapons associated with medieval Europe, although some flails used hinges instead of chains.

== In Japan ==
Various chain weapons were used in feudal Japan. Recognised fighting arts with such weapons include gekigan-jutsu (using a ball and chain), chigiriki-jutsu (using a ball and chain on a short stick), and kusarigama-jutsu (employing a chain-ball-sickle weapon). Ninja were expert at handling kusarigama, the composite sickle and chain with a ball being small enough to be easily concealed, and which was used to haul an enemy close enough to be dispatched by a thrust or slash of the razor-sharp kama. The shoge was a ring with a sickle-like knife on a chain that could be used to pierce armor, grapple, and to entangle the legs of man and horse. The chigiriki was a staff with a weighted chain on the end. The manriki-gusari was a double weighted chain. The nunchaku was a short chain with two short wooden sticks on the ends, although it was principally a farming tool rather than a weapon, at least until much later.

== Gallery ==
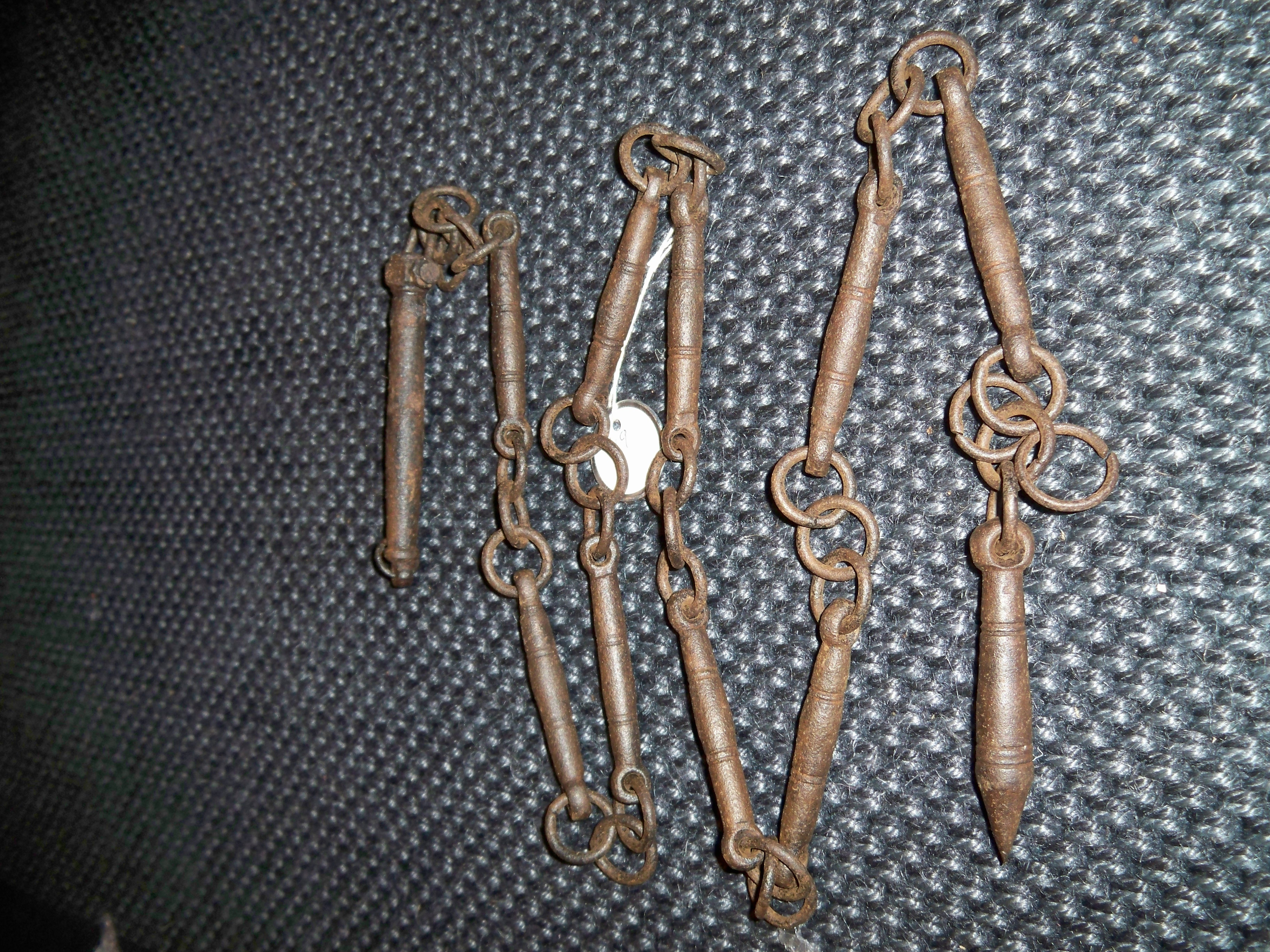
Asian chain whip

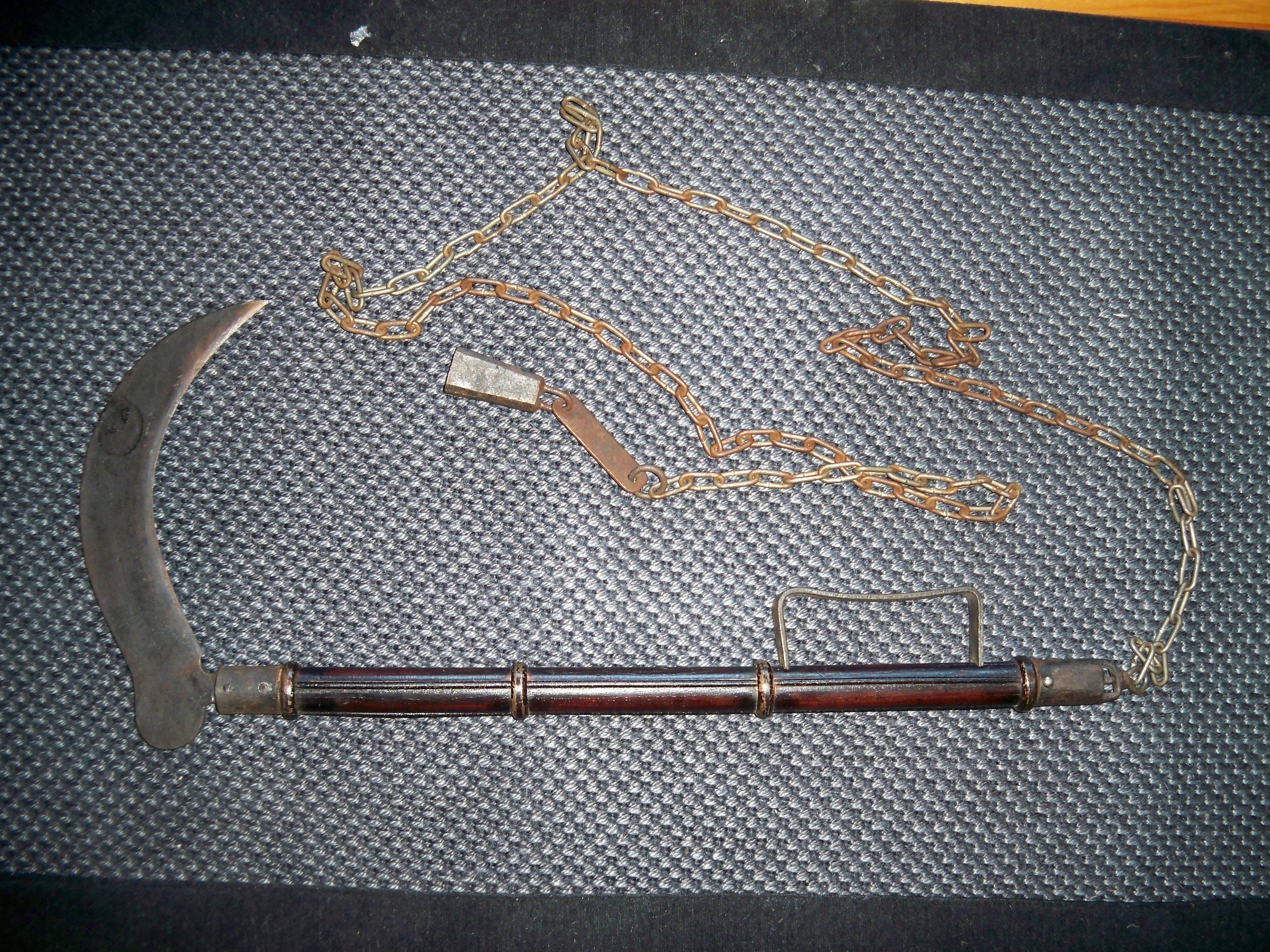
Japanese sickle weapon with a chain and iron weight attached "kusarigama"

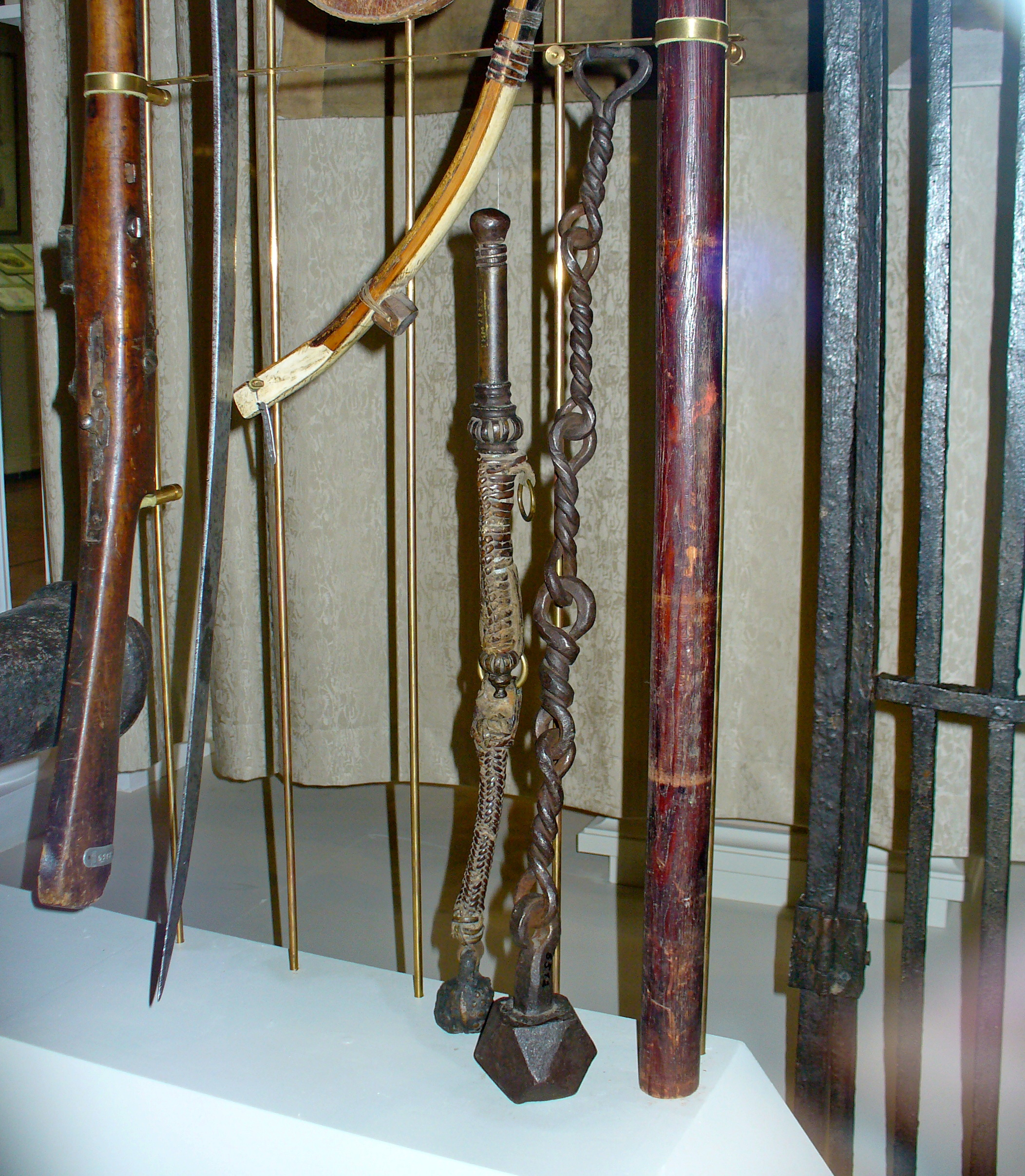
Russian flails, 18th century

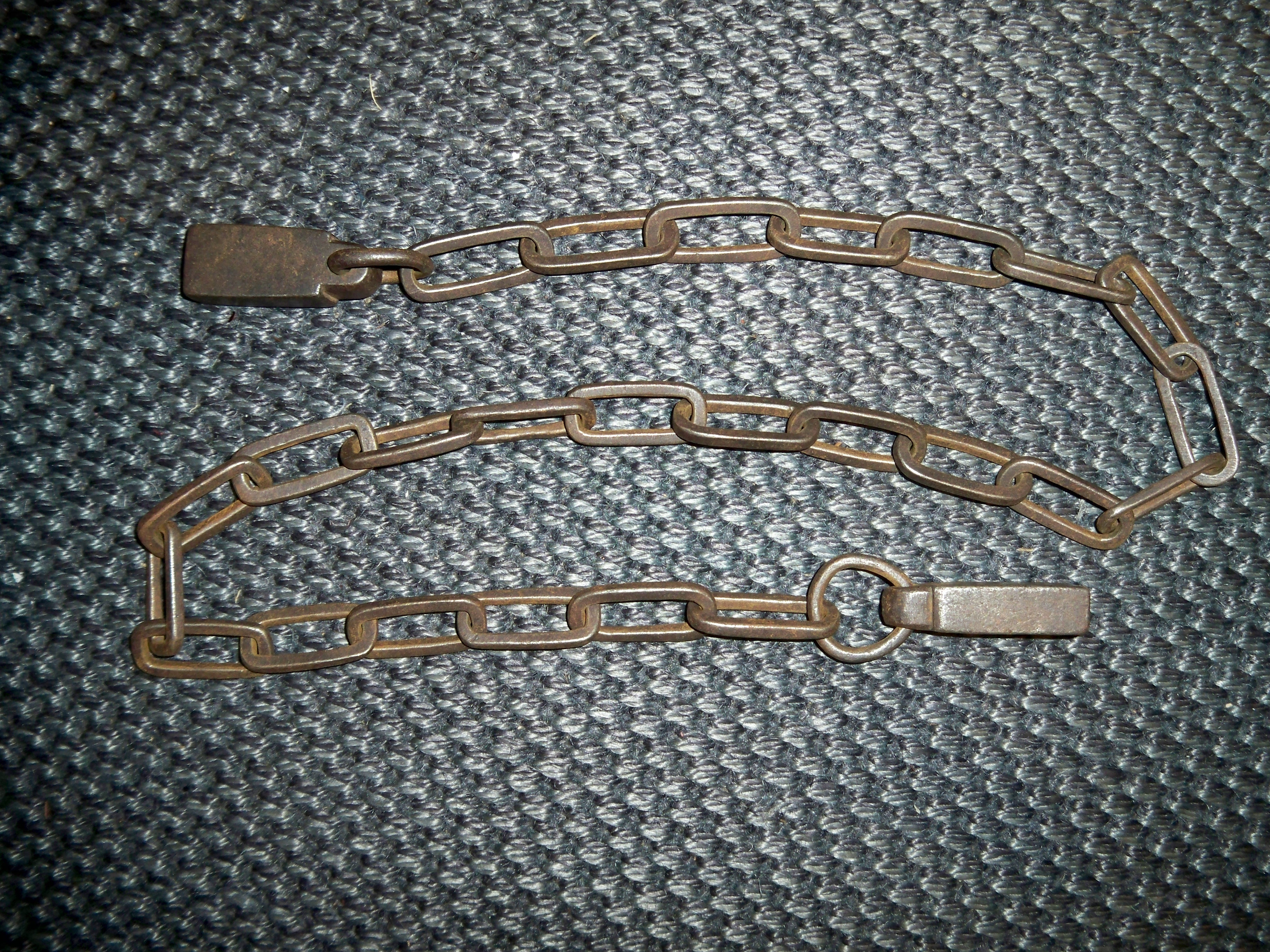
Antique Japanese chain weapon "manriki"

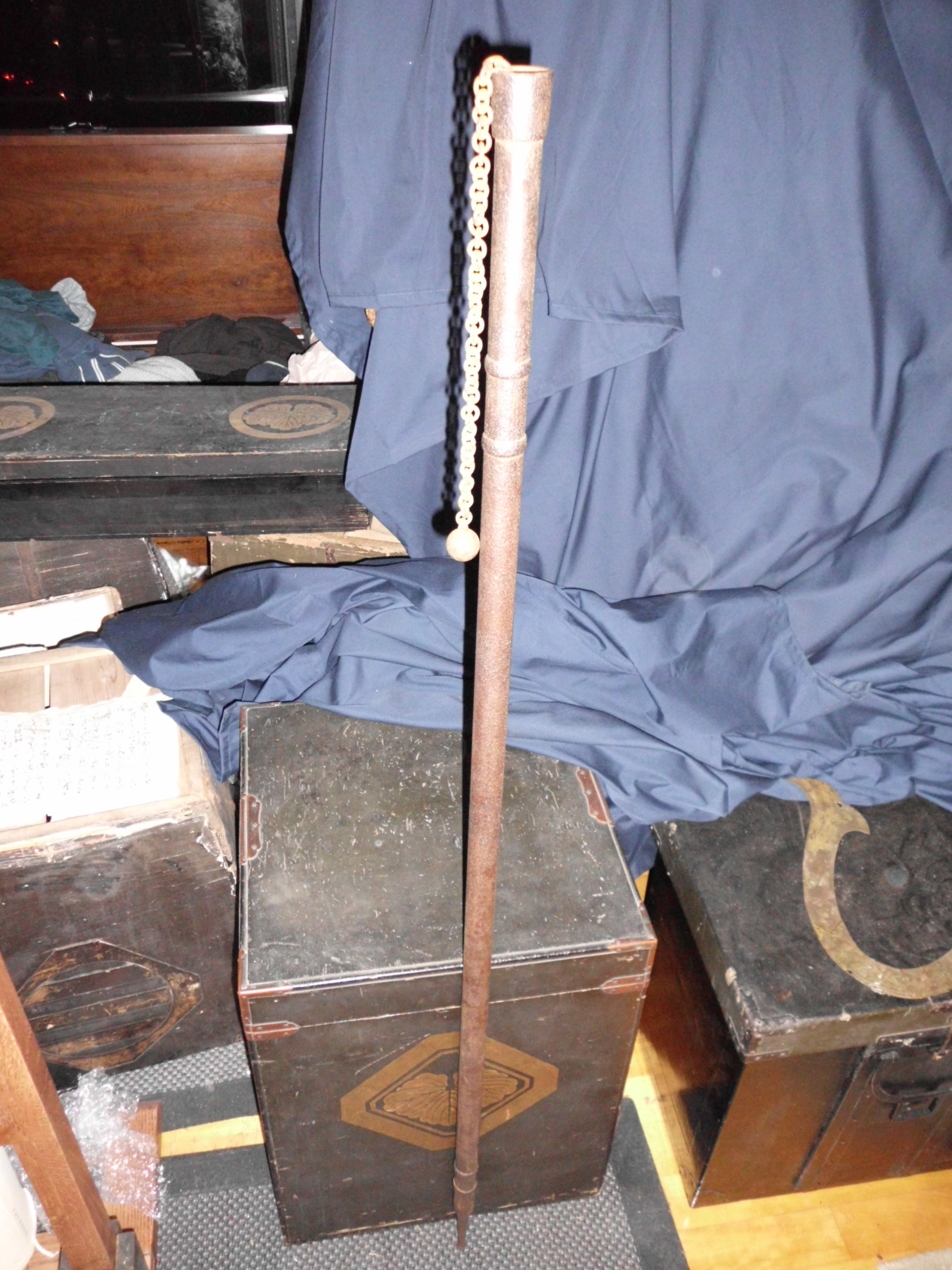
Japanese tetsu chigiriki, a hollow iron cane that has an iron weight attached to a chain hidden inside

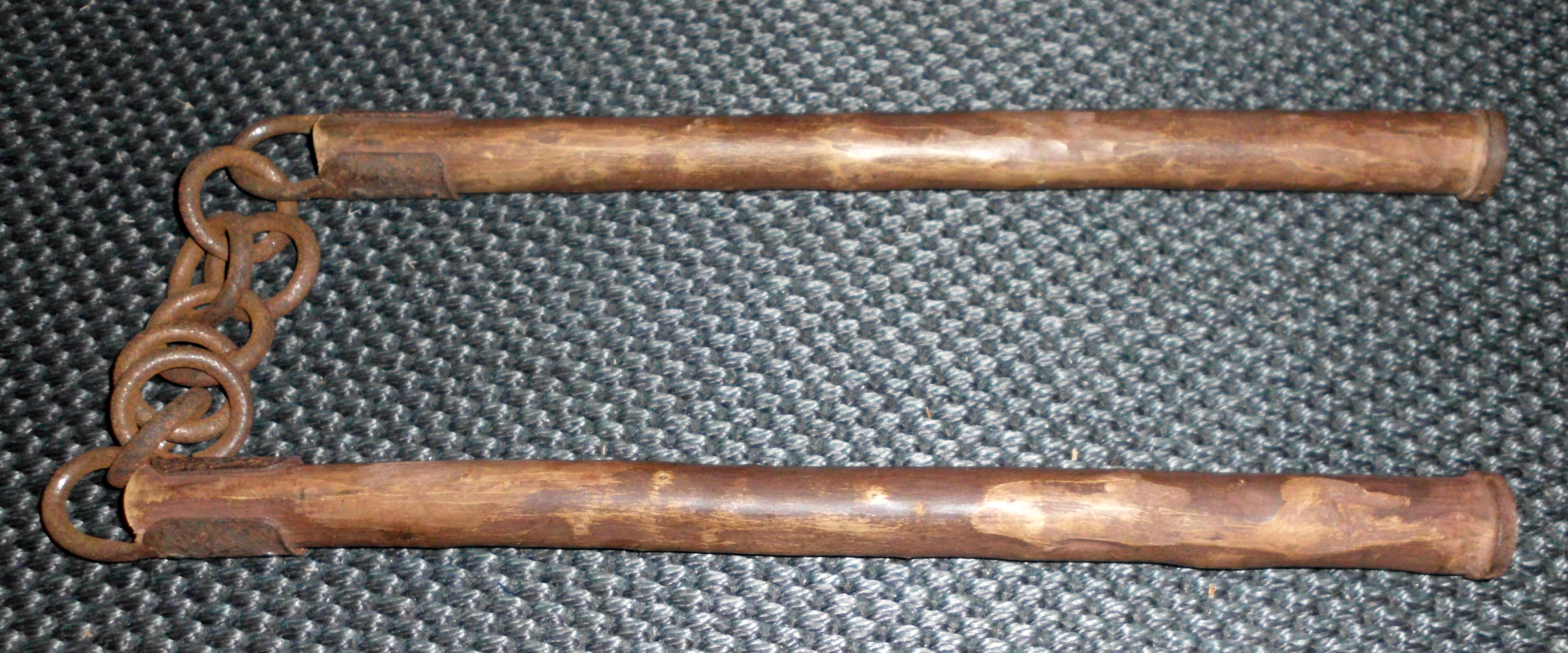
Nunchaku (nunchuck)

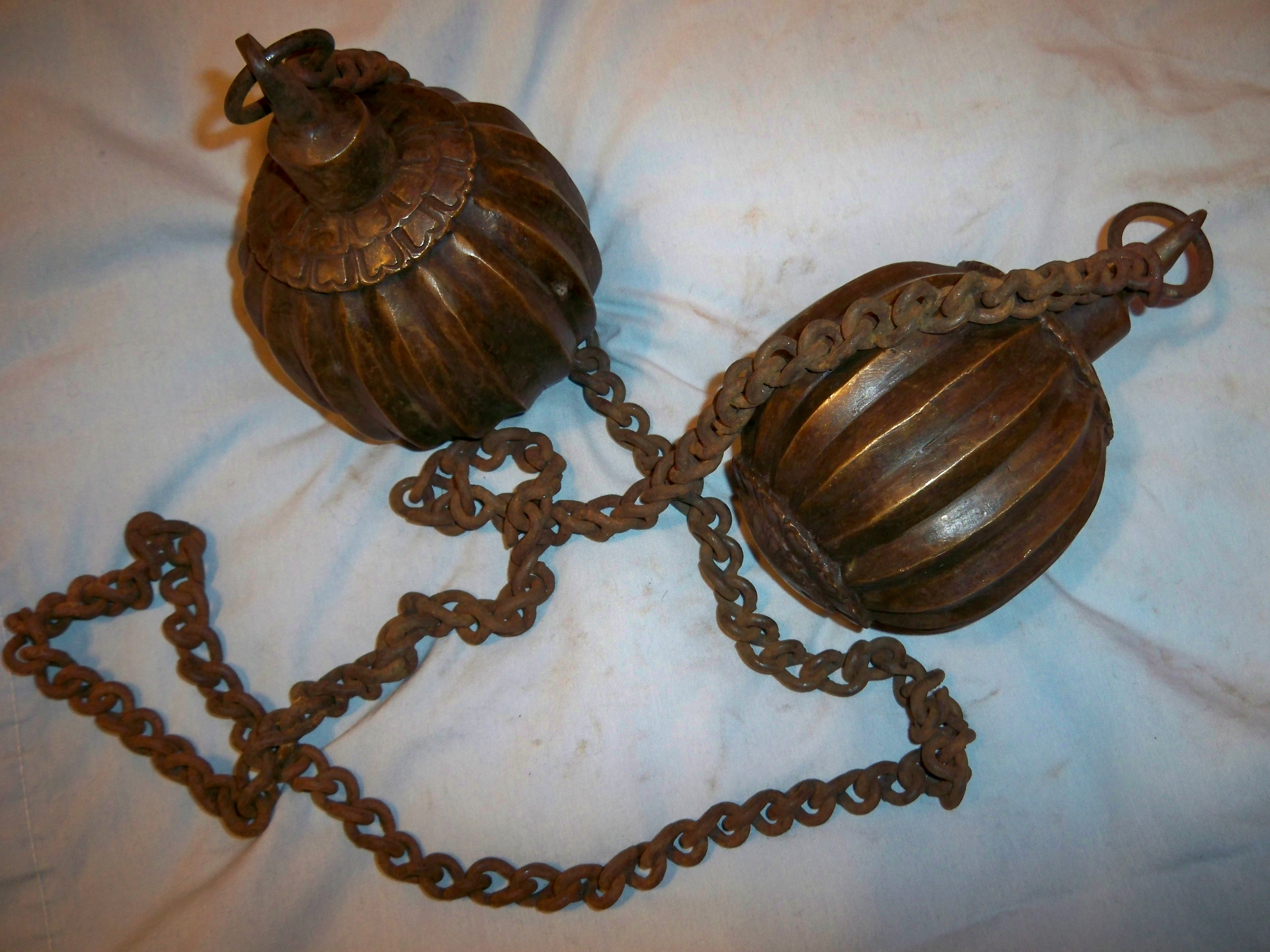
Meteor hammer

== See also ==
- Chain shot – Cannon projectile of two ball connected by chain
- Bolas
- Chainlock
- Chain whip
- Flail (weapon)
- Kusari-fundo
- Meteor hammer
- Rope dart (loosely speaking)
- Slungshot (not to be confused with slingshot)
- Surujin
- Tabak-Toyok
- Three section staff
- List of martial arts weapons
