= Chainlock =

Improvised weapon

- Type: Blunt weapon / Improvised weapon

A chainlock, also known as a smiley, is an improvised weapon which consists of a length of chain or strong cloth attached to a large lock or other piece of metal. The chainlock is mainly used in areas where other hand held weapons, such as knives, are not readily available.

The chainlock is used by swinging the heavy end of the chain at the target. The chainlock is not usually considered to be a lethal weapon, but can cause much damage when used proficiently.

Chainlocks are normally used in gang warfare and they are also popular in punk communities. They are commonly worn around the neck or in belt holes, as a fashion statement or an accessible/discreet way to carry them.

Many jewelry and fashion brands have been inspired by these chainlock necklaces and belt chains, manufacturing non-lethal versions to sell.

== See also ==
- Bolas
- Chain whip
- Flail (weapon)
- Kusari-fundo
- Meteor hammer
- Rope dart (loosely speaking)
- Slungshot (not to be confused with slingshot)
- Surujin
- Tabak-Toyok
- Three section staff
- List of martial arts weapons
