= Flying claws =

Weapon in Chinese martial arts

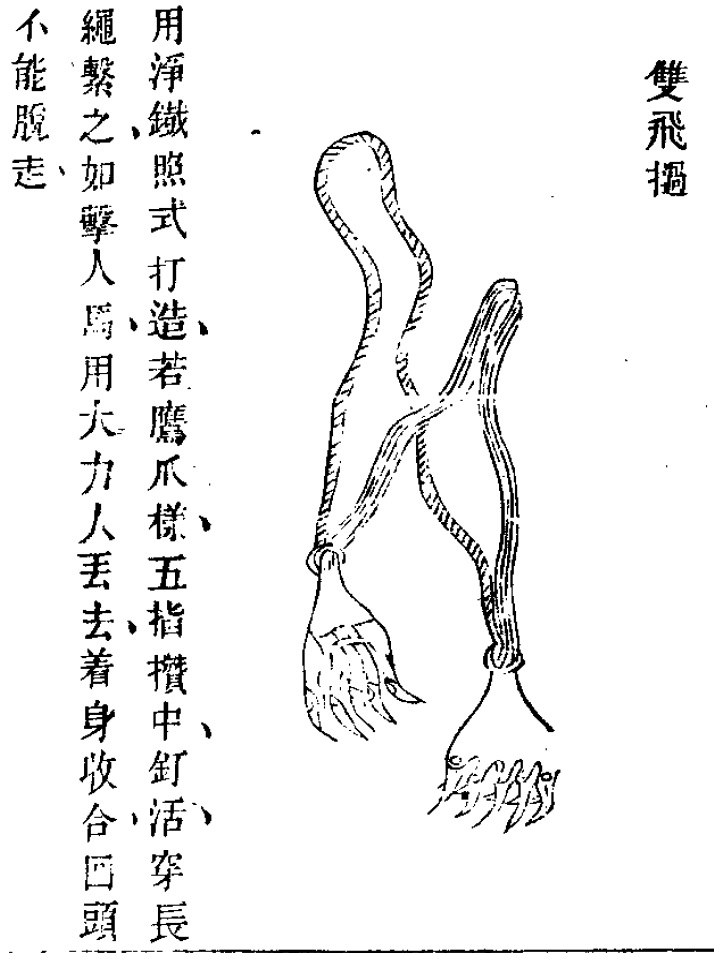
A pair of flying claws depicted in the Chinese military text Wubei Zhi

The flying claw, flying talon, or soft talon (Chinese: 飛爪; pinyin: fēizhuǎ / fēizhǎo) is a medieval Chinese weapon that was used to ensnare a foe and throw them off balance. It originated during the Sui dynasty and is one of the flexible or soft weapons in the Chinese martial arts. It features metal hand or claw on the end of a chain or rope. It is in the same family as the meteor hammer, rope dart, and chain whip. First appearing during the Ming dynasty (1368 – 1644 CE), the (shuang fei zhua) claw consists of two iron eagle claws attached together by a length of rope, much like a flying weight. These claws, however, were not fixed like a grappling hook, but rather were designed to grab the adversary upon contact and rip their muscles out. Tied with a long cord, it can be used to attack people and horses.

It is designed to wrap, capture, entangle and grip. Some are more elaborate and the claw actually closes and tightens when the rope/chain is pulled. Those are constructed with a spring mechanism within the metal claw that allows the claw to open and close as the tether is pulled or released. Some of the latter can grab trees and rip off the bark.

The flying claw varies in reach and chain/rope length. Length of the chain or rope can be up to 15 m (49 ft).

A mace variant of the weapon existed, called an iron claw (Chinese: 挝; tiē zhǎo), where the (opened) claw is not attached to a chain or rope but to a handle. It should not be confused with the iron fist (Chinese: 鐵拳; pinyin: tiěquán) which has a closed claw or fist design for the head of the weapon.

== In popular culture ==
- The flying claws appear in the kung fu film Tiger & Crane Fists. The footage was later used in the comedy film Kung Pow! Enter the Fist.

== See also ==
- Dragon beard hook
