= Surujin =

Japanese throwing weapon

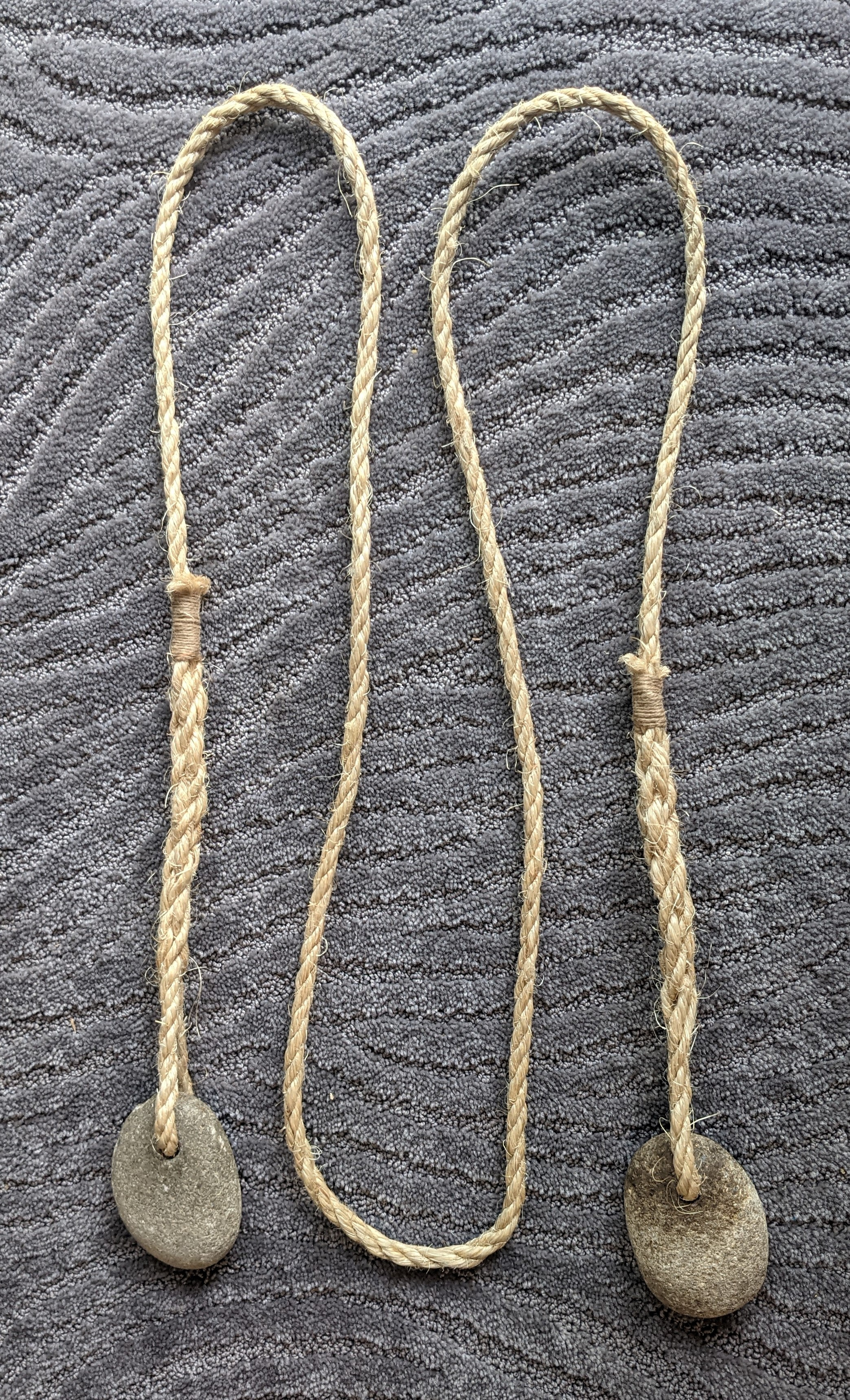
A surujin of rope and two stones.

The surujin or suruchin is one of the traditional weapons of Okinawan kobudo. It comprises a 2–3 m (6 ft 7 in – 9 ft 10 in) long rope with a weight tied to each end. Historically this weapon is very prevalent and can be found attached to a weapon or used separately. It is a weapon designed for warfare.

== Usage ==
In more recent times, specifically the end of the 19th century and early part of the 20th century, the surujin appeared as a weighted lightweight chain varying in length between 2–3 m (6 ft 7 in – 9 ft 10 in) in length. At one end was a weight and the other a metal spike. The weight was used to throw at an opponent or to ensnare a weapon and the length of chain was then either pulled to unbalance the enemy or used to entwine them using techniques similar to that of hojōjutsu. The spike was then employed to disable or administer a coup de grâce. It belongs to the broad class of chain weapons.

These are quite similar to the ninjutsu manriki.

== Gallery ==
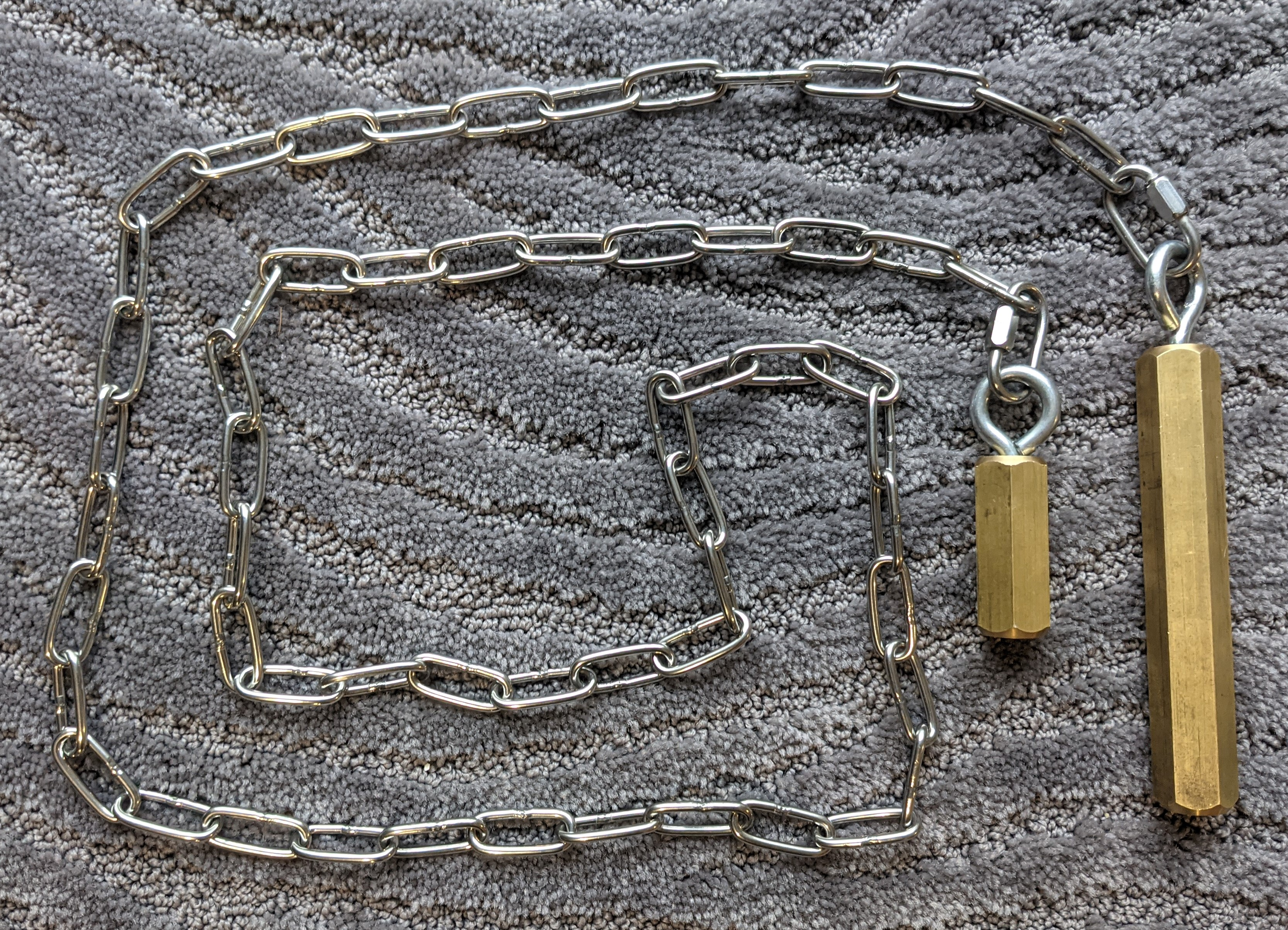
Okinawan chain surujin

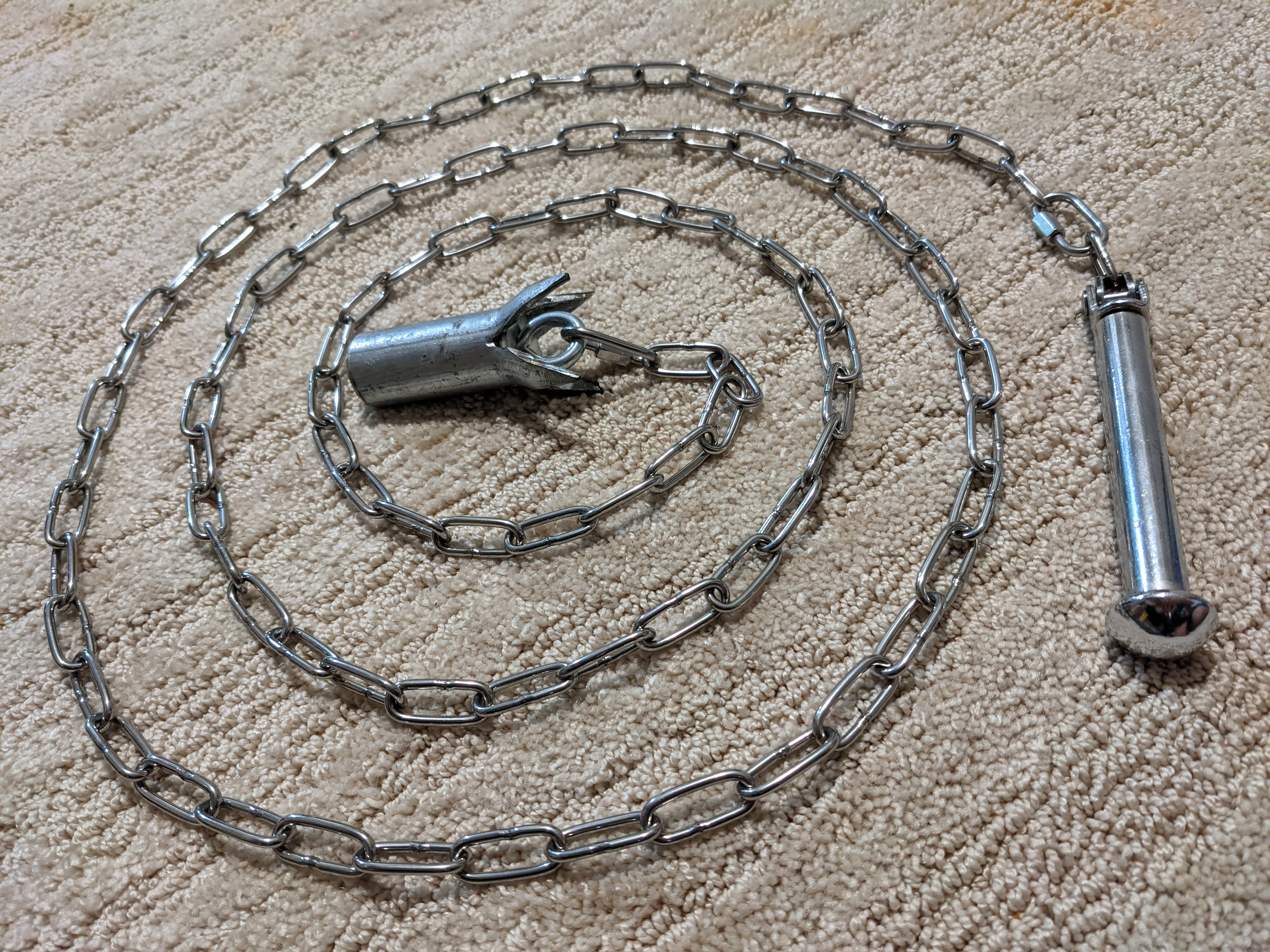
Okinawan spiked chain surujin

== See also ==
- Bolas
- Flail (weapon)
- Kusari-fundo
- Meteor hammer
- Rope dart
- List of martial arts weapons
