= Dragon beard hook =

Dragon beard hook and section of rope

The Chinese dragon beard hook (also known as the Longxu hook) is a thrown entangling/trapping concealable weapon. It features a two pronged steel hook about 33 cm (13 in) long. An iron ring on a crescent-shaped body allows a rope to be attached. The hooks consist of two spearheads with serrated ends, 20 cm (8 in) apart. The rope, about 10 m (30 ft) long, can be tied to the user's wrist. This allowed the user to snag and reel in an adversary, which made the weapon very popular amongst constables in bygone days.

Training to use the weapon is much like learning to use a rope dart. The weapon hails from Song dynasty.

== See also ==
- Flying claws
- Grappling hook
