= Morning star (weapon) =

Club-like weapon

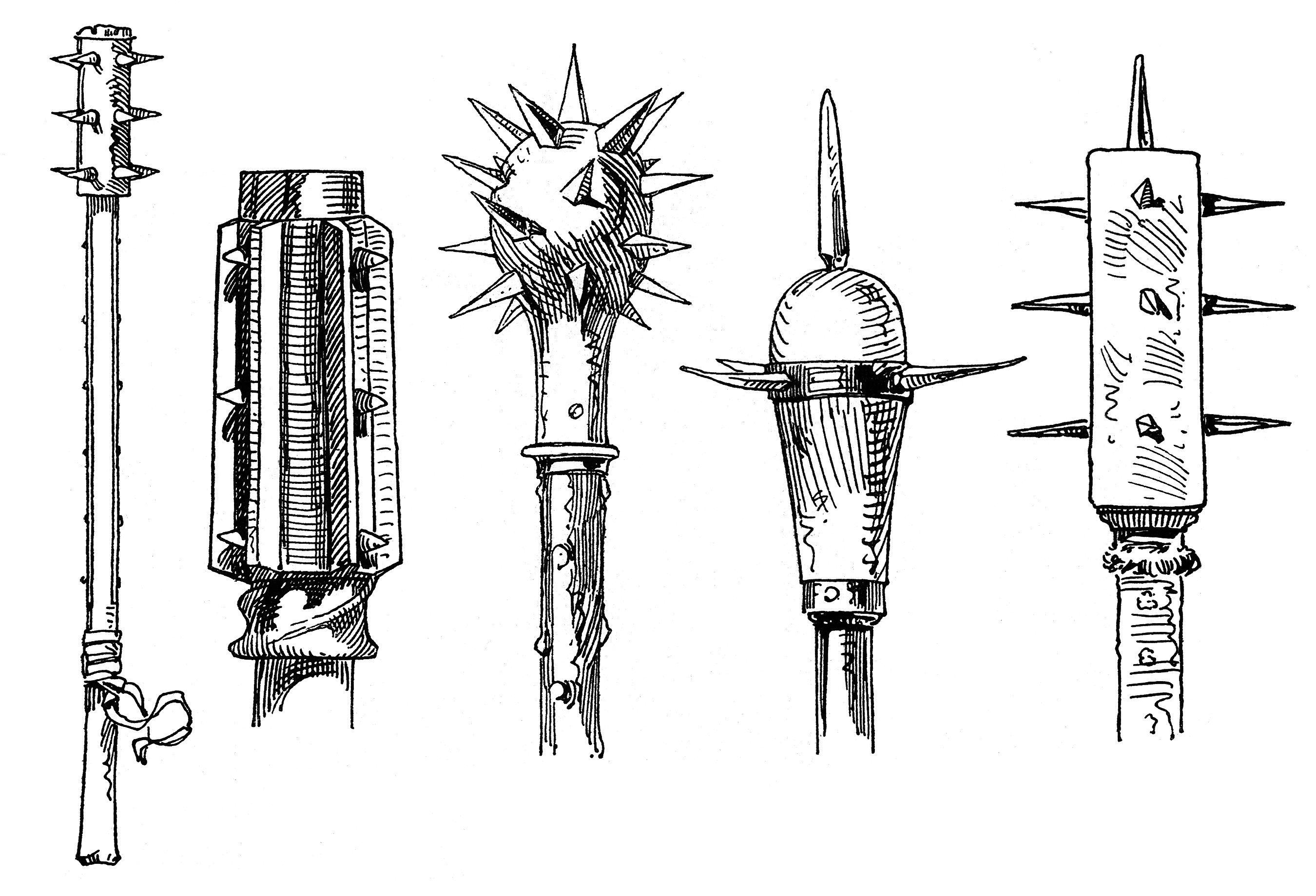
A morning star (middle) shown among other club designs

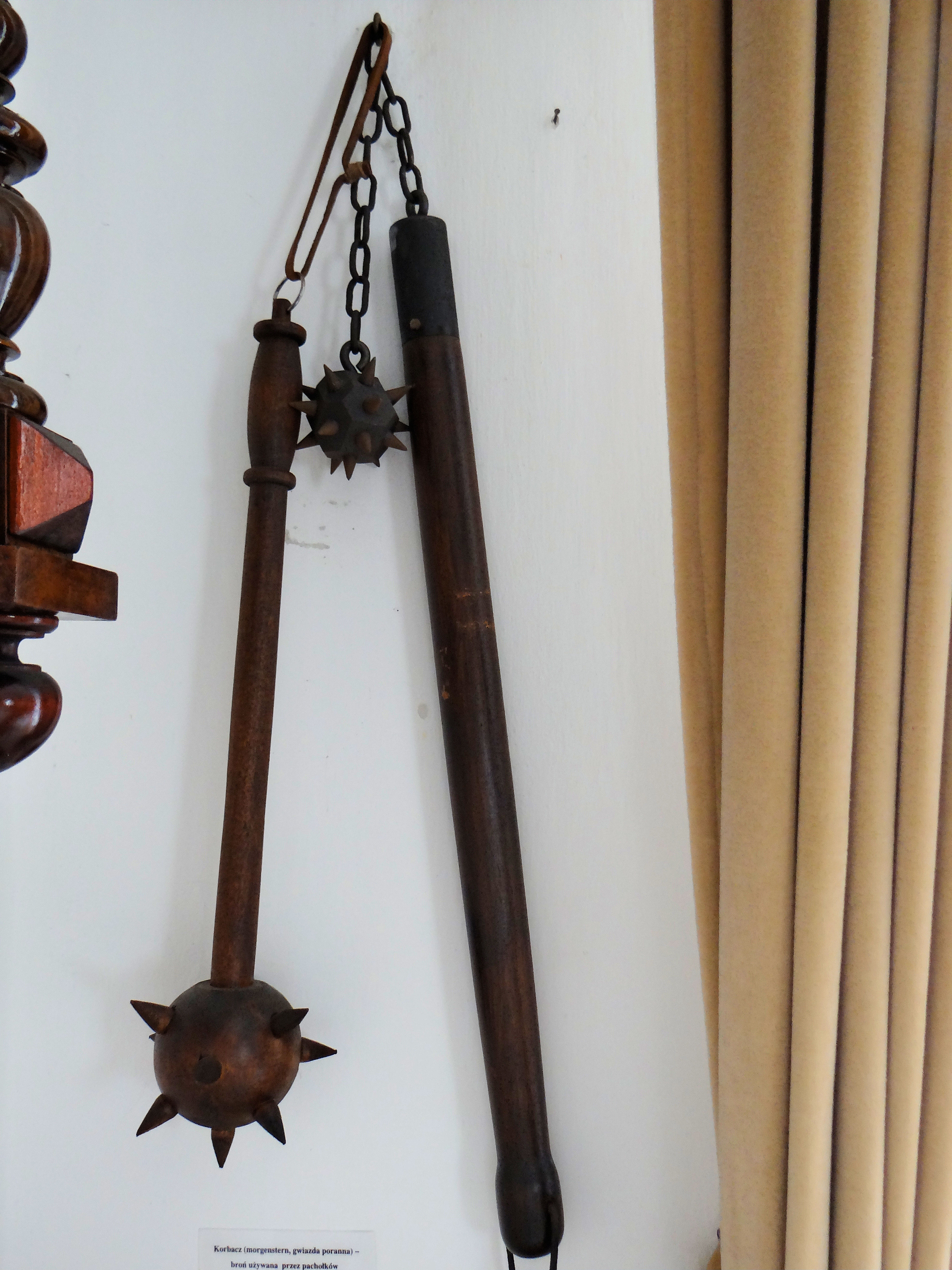
Morning star (left), next to a ball-and-chain flail (right)

A morning star (German: Morgenstern) is any of several medieval club-like weapons consisting of a shaft with an attached ball adorned with one or more spikes. Such weapons provided their wielders with a combination of blunt-force and puncture attack to kill or wound an enemy.

== History ==
The morning star first came into widespread use around the beginning of the fourteenth century, particularly in Germany where it was known as Morgenstern. The term is often confused with the military flail (fléau d'armes in French and Kriegsflegel in German), which typically consists of a wooden shaft joined by a length of chain to one or more iron-shod wooden bars (heavy sword pommels have also been used as weights). However, there are few depictions of such a ball-and-chain flail from the period, so the weapon of this type appears to have been uncommon.

== Design ==
The morning star is a medieval weapon consisting of a spiked head mounted on a shaft, resembling a mace, usually with a long spike extending straight from the top and many smaller spikes around the particle of the head. Its simpler, rather improvised construction distinguish it from a flanged mace, which required the skilled craftsmanship of a smith. Versions of it were used by both infantry and cavalry; the cavalry versions tended to have shorter shafts or more slender designs to facilitate one-handed use. The mace was a traditional knightly weapon that developed somewhat independently; as the mace transitioned to being constructed entirely of metal, the morning star retained its characteristic wooden shaft. Many surviving morning stars are of a longer two-handed form typically six feet in length, with some longer examples.

There were three types, all differing in quality of workmanship. The first was the well-crafted military type used by professional soldiers, made in series by expert weaponsmiths for stocking in town arsenals. The second and much simpler type would have been hand-cut by peasant militia men, rather than turned on a lathe, from wood they had gathered themselves and fitted with nails and spikes by the local blacksmith. The shaft and head were usually of one piece but sometimes reinforced at the top with an iron band. The third type was decorative in nature, usually short-hafted and made of metal, one sixteenth century example being of steel and damascened with inlaid gold and silver, in the Wallace Collection of London.

== Holy water sprinkler ==
The holy water sprinkler (from its resemblance to the aspergillum used in the Catholic Mass), was a morning star used by the English army in the sixteenth century and made in series by professional smiths. One such weapon can be found in the Royal Armouries and has an all-steel head with six flanges forming three spikes each, reminiscent of a mace but with a short thick spike of square cross section extending from the top. The wooden shaft is reinforced with four langets and the overall length of the weapon is 74.5 inches (189 cm).

The term holy water sprinkler is also used to describe a type of military flail, this being the name for the weapon in French (goupillon). It was (according to popular legend) the favored weapon of King John of Bohemia, who was blind, and used to simply lay about himself on all sides.

== Examples ==
Two examples of the military type are housed in the museums of Vienna, both from the 16th century. The first measures 2.35 m (7 ft 9 in) in length including the top spike which is 54 cm (21 in). The head is a separate wooden cylinder slipped over the top of the shaft and reinforced with steel bands, with five metal spikes in symmetrical arrangement. The second example has an all-steel head of complex craftsmanship with four V-shaped spikes mounted on a long shaft that measures slightly less than two metres in length. A twisted and braided steel bar joins the socket to the base of the top spike. There are also 183 surviving specimens in Graz, made in series and delivered to the arsenal in 1685. They are comparable in length to the previous examples and have three rows of spikes around the head. The wooden shafts of most morning stars of the military type are reinforced with metal langets extending down from the head. Still others can be found in the Swiss arsenals of Lucerne and Zürich.

== In art ==
Two crossed morning stars on the former coat of arms of the Kurikka municipality

These types of morning stars are also depicted in medieval art. For instance, one is shown being carried by an armored knight or soldier in the Caesar Tapestries in the Historical Museum of Bern, depicting Julius Caesar's battle against the Germanic leader Ariovistus. These tapestries were woven in Tournai between 1465 and 1470, and taken as plunder from Charles the Bold after one of his defeats during the Burgundian Wars against the Swiss. In the poem Le Chevalier Délibéré written by Olivier de la Marche and first published in 1486, there is an anonymous woodcut depicting a knight carrying a rather simple morning star with spikes mounted in an asymmetrical pattern as well as a flail equipped with a single spiked ball, known in German as a "Kettenmorgenstern" (literally chain-morning star) which is technically a military flail.

== Similar weapons ==
=== Goedendag ===
A goedendag was a Flemish weapon which is often described in modern sources as similar to the morning star. However, this is a misconception; it was an infantry weapon in the form of a thick wooden shaft between 1.2 to 1.8 m (3.9 to 5.9 ft) in length, slightly thicker toward the top, topped with a stout iron spike. The weapon was used to great effect by the guildsmen of Flanders' wealthy cities against the French knights during the Guldensporenslag or Battle of the Golden Spurs near Kortrijk (Courtrai) on 11 July 1302; however, on account of superior but more expensive alternatives, it saw limited service from the fifteenth century on, being used exclusively by the Flemish burghers.

The goedendag was used to spear horses or knights, but little is certain about its precise mode of use.

== See also ==
- Flail (weapon)
- Kanabō
- Mace (bludgeon)
- Meteor hammer
- Pistol sword
- Chuí (Chinese weapon)

== General and cited references ==
- Dictionary of Medieval Knighthood and Chivalry by Bradford Broughton (New York, Greenwood Press, 1986, ISBN 0-313-24552-5, OCLC 11624273)
- Hafted Weapons in Medieval and Renaissance Europe: The Evolution of European Staff Weapons Between 1200 and 1650 by John Waldman (Brill, 2005, ISBN 90-04-14409-9)
- Medieval Military Technology by Kelly DeVries (Broadview Press, 1998, ISBN 0-921149-74-3)
