= Masaki Toshimitsu Dannoshin =

Masaki Toshimitsu Dannoshin (正木 俊光, February 11, 1690 – May 22, 1776) (Note: Serge Mol spells his name as Masaki Tarōdayū Dannoshin Toshiyoshi and gives 1689 as birth year.) was a famous swordsman of Japan during the 18th century. Dannoshin served as a guard of the Edo Castle. Dannoshin considered killing people on the grounds of the palace to be rather sacrilegious. Due to this belief, Dannoshin tried to find a more peaceful way to apprehend intruders. After some time, Dannoshin produced a two-foot-long chain with two weights, one attached to each end, and devised a series of techniques to disarm and subdue an armed opponent. Dannoshin's unique weapon soon became known as the manriki-gusari, in which manriki means "10,000 power", and gusari means "chain". This was because Dannoshin believed that the weapon contained the power and the ingenuity of 10,000 people. This weapon fighting style soon evolved into Masaki-ryū.

Dannoshin's style became popular because students had the capability to fight against various armed or unarmed opponents simultaneously. The weights of the chains also had the capability to confuse, as they whirled about, and stun an opponent with an accurate blow. When directed at the ankles of the opponent, the manriki-gusari could be used to pull the feet from under the target.
