= Chuí (Chinese weapon) =

Chinese melee weapon

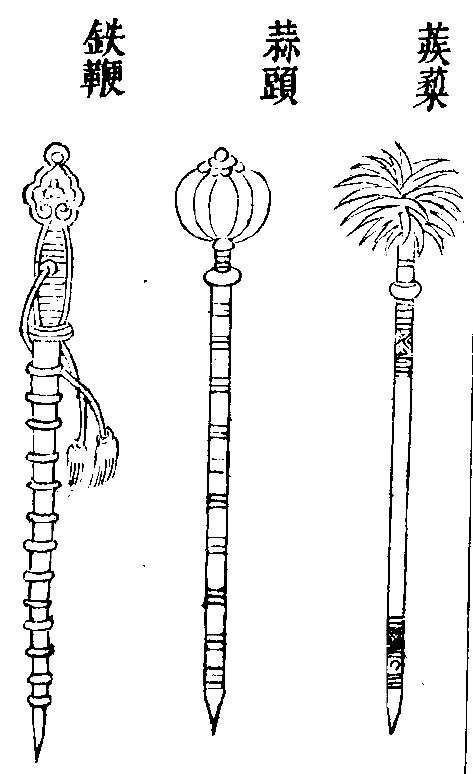
Chuí (middle) depicted in Chinese military compendium Wujing Zongyao

Chuí (simplified Chinese: 锤; traditional Chinese: 錘; lit. 'hammer/mace') is a Chinese melee weapon that consists of a large, solid metal sphere on the end of a medium-long handle.

This weapon was traditionally used with brute force, as the strength needed to heft such weapons was considerable. As a result, this weapon is not often practiced by kung fu enthusiasts, and newly made replicas may be hollow. However, routines for this weapon still exist in some styles. Chuí are almost always used in pairs.

One variation of chuí is liúxīngchuí, which is a smaller pair of chuí linked together by a long rope, used as a missile weapon that can be retrieved.

== In popular culture ==
The Japanese manga and anime series Ranma ½ depicts Shampoo bearing a pair of chuí (misidentified as bonbori).
