= Meteor hammer =

Chinese flail and chain weapon

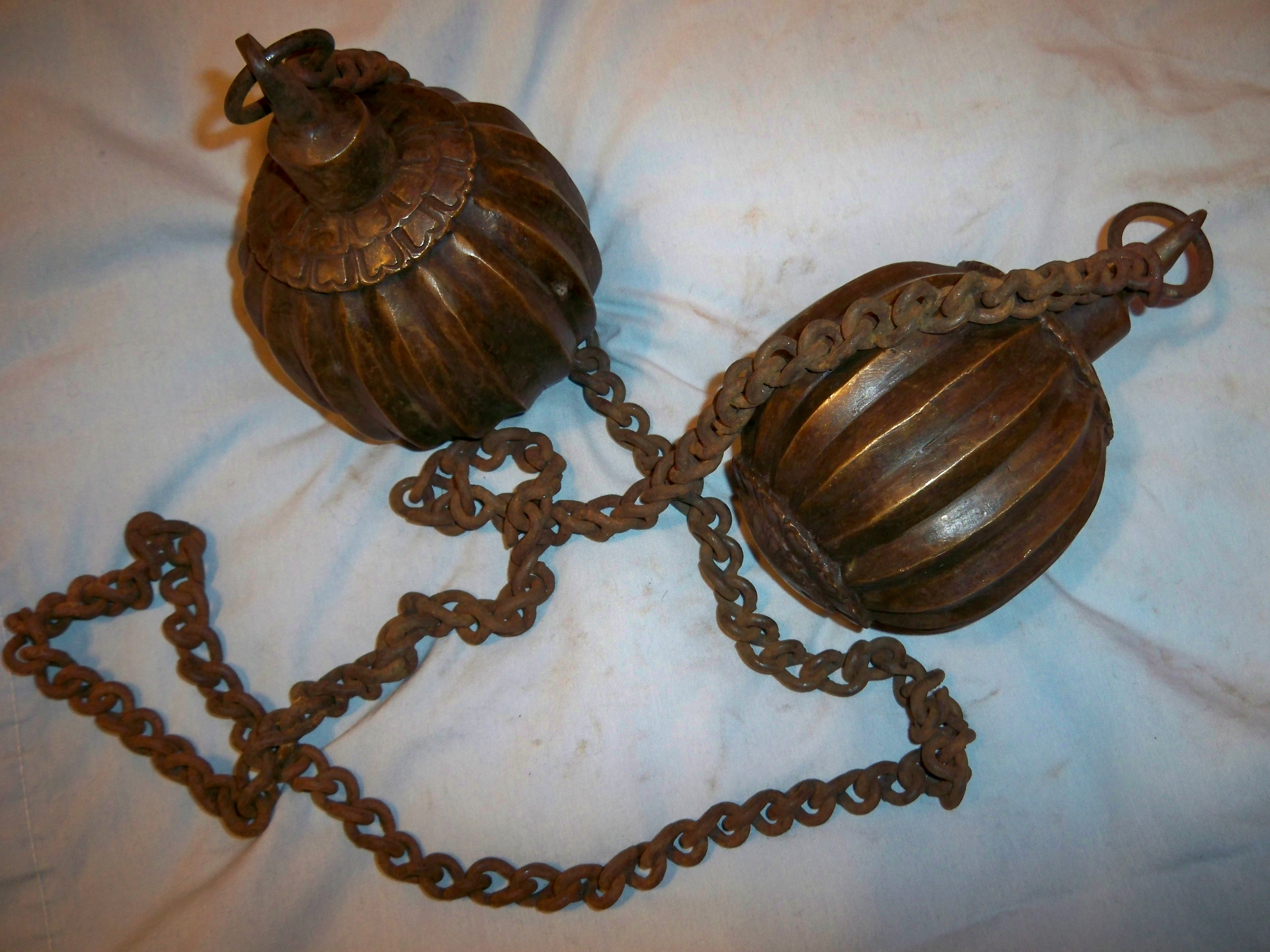
A double-headed meteor hammer

A meteor hammer (Chinese: 流星錘; pinyin: liúxīng chuí), often referred to simply as meteor (Chinese: 流星; pinyin: liúxīng) is an ancient Chinese weapon, consisting at its most basic level of two weights connected by a rope or chain. One of the flexible or "soft" weapons, this weapon is referred to by many different names worldwide, dependent upon region, construction and intended use. Other names in use include dai chui, flying hammer, or dragon's fist. It belongs to the broader classes of flail and chain weapons. Little evidence exists that it saw use in actual historical combat.

== Design ==
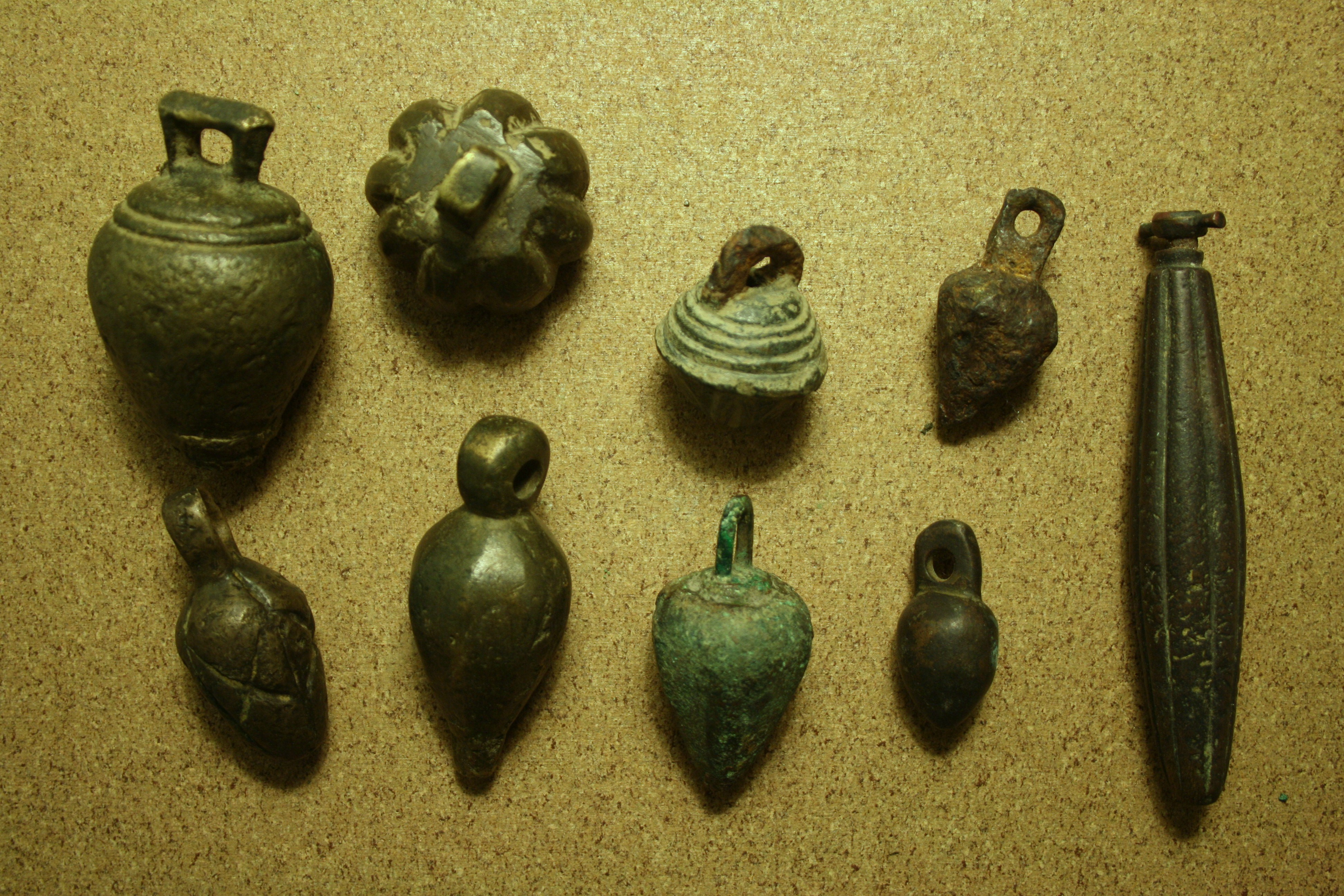
Various meteor hammers, Yuan dynasty

A meteor hammer consists of a flexible chain or rope with a weight attached to one or both ends. They have similar construction to a bola, but heavier and not suitable for throwing. Users generally find the weapon easy to conceal due to its flexible nature, and it works well for defensive or surprise use.

Using a meteor hammer involves swinging the weight around the body to build up angular momentum, and then striking at the target. If the weight swings around the intended target, encircling it, the long length of chain may wrap around the target's body, limbs, or weapons.

=== Types ===
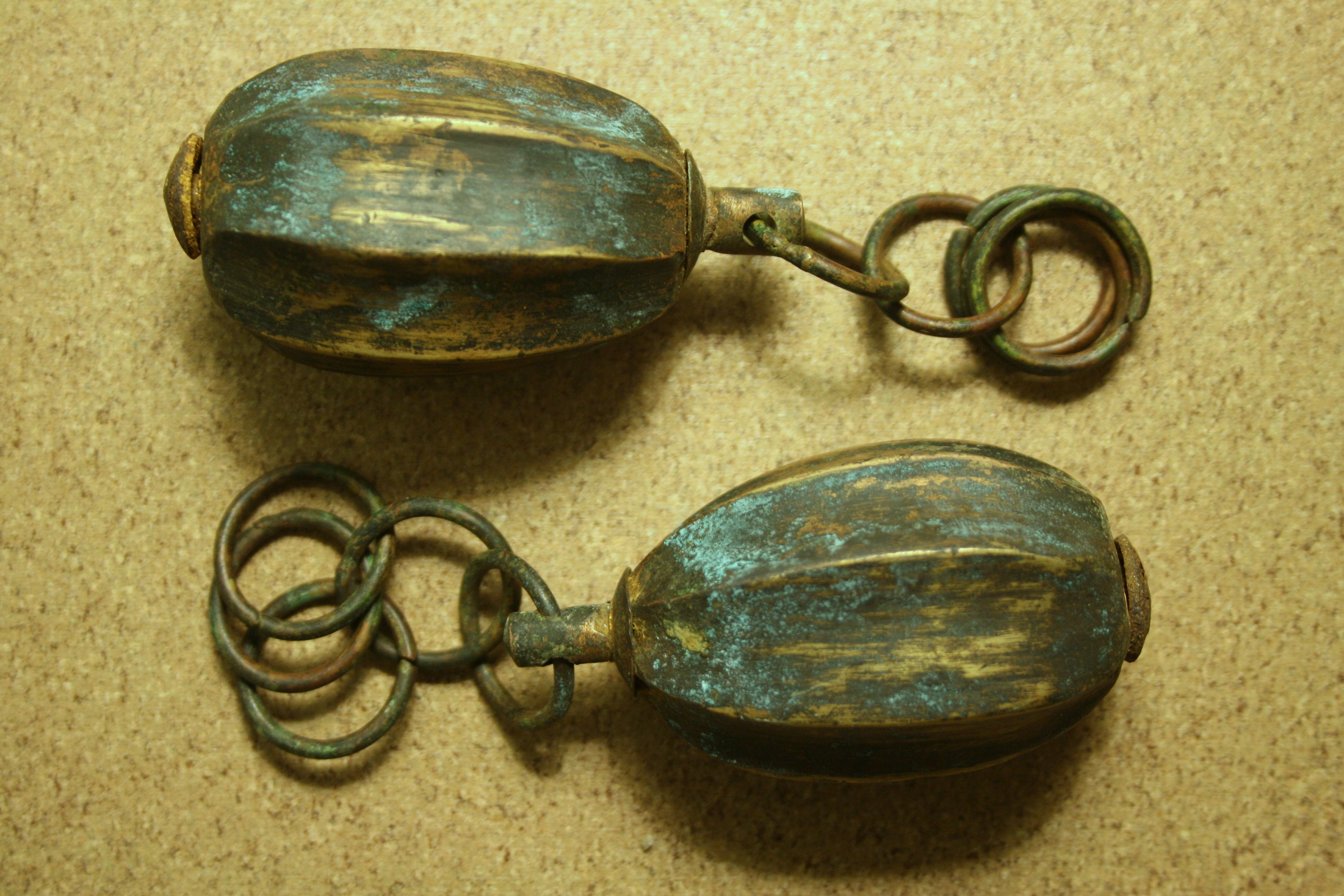
Meteor hammers, Ming dynasty

Many split the category of meteor hammers into two categories: double-headed and single-headed.

Those who make double-headed meteor hammers typically make them 2–3 metres (6.6–9.8 feet) in length with a spherical head on each end. While the ends of the meteor hammer tend to feel heavier than a rope dart head due to the addition of material, makers generally keep the difference in weight minimal. Some meteor hammers have much lighter heads, making them well-suited for practice and for modern wushu displays since they move faster and tend to do less damage. Since the meteor has two heads, one may use one head offensively while using the other to defend, parrying attacks or ensnaring an opponent's weapon to attempt to disarm them.

The single-headed version of this weapon finds its use as a melee weapon in a similar manner to the rope dart, though with a rounded head instead of the rope dart's point. The head can traditionally weigh up to 3 kilograms (6.6 pounds) attached to a rope, 6 metres (20 feet) in length (in contrast to the rope dart, which typically measures about 3.6 metres (12 feet) long). Because of these traits, a single-headed meteor hammer can deliver a great amount of force to a target but is difficult to control.

== See also ==
- Bolas
- Chain whip
- Chigiriki
- Chuí (Chinese weapon)
- Eskimo yo-yo
- Fire dancing
- Flail (weapon)
- List of martial arts weapons
- Morning star (weapon)
- Nunchaku
- Poi (juggling)
- Rope dart
- Suruchin
- Zhou Tong (archer)
