= List of martial arts weapons =

Weapons used in the world's martial arts can be classified either by type of weapon or by the martial arts school using them.

== By weapon type ==
=== Handheld weapons ===
- Bladed weapons
  - Swords: see Types of swords
  - Knives
  - Daggers: see List of daggers
  - Axe
  - Sickle/Kama
  - War hammer
- Polearms
  - Halberd
  - Spear/Yari
  - Naginata
  - Guandao
  - War scythe
- Blunt weapons
  - Clubs/Mace/Baton
  - Stick/Staff
  - Tonfa/(side handled) baton
  - Knuckleduster
- Flexible weapons
  - Chain weapons
  - Whips
    - Sjambok
  - Ropes
  - Tabak-Toyok
  - Slapjack
  - Nunchaku
  - Jōhyō

=== Projectile weapons ===
- Bow and arrow
- Crossbow
- Bullet-shooting crossbow
- Slingshot
- Slings
- Boomerang
- Blowgun
- Shuriken
- Chakram
- Firearm
- Taser
- Ballistic knife

=== Defensive weapons ===
- List of defensive weapons
  - Pepper spray
  - Armours
    - Shields

== By martial arts tradition ==
- Eskrima
- Kendo
- Pencak Silat: Weapons of pencak silat
- Kalarippayattu
- Swordsmanship:
  - Chinese swordsmanship
  - Japanese swordsmanship
  - Korean swordsmanship
  - European swordsmanship
  - Historical European Martial Arts

== See also ==
- List of practice weapons
