= Chigiriki =

Japanese flail weapon

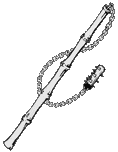
Chigiriki

The chigiriki (契木) is a Japanese flail weapon. It consists of a solid or hollow wood (sometimes bamboo) or iron staff with an iron weight and chain on the end, sometimes retractable. The chigiriki is a more aggressive variation of the parrying weapon kusarigama. It can be used to strike or entangle the opponent as well as to parry his blows and to capture or incapacitate an opponent's weapon.

The stick can be as long as the wielder's forearm or longer, while the length of the chain could also be of various lengths. The iron weight could have spikes and its shape could be round or be multi sided. Its origin is not clearly known. Chigiriki belong to the furi-zue family of weapons (brandishing-sticks), which include any type of stick or staff with a chain attached. It is also one of the shinobi-zue weapons (concealed staffs and canes), which were often hollow and had multiple uses, such as hiding other weapons like shuriken, or as a blow gun or breathing tube. The method of training in the use of chigiriki is called chigiriki-jutsu (契木術). The chigiriki is said to be used by the Kiraku-ryū and the Araki-ryū schools.

== Schools ==
- Kiraku-ryū
- Araki-ryū

== Gallery ==
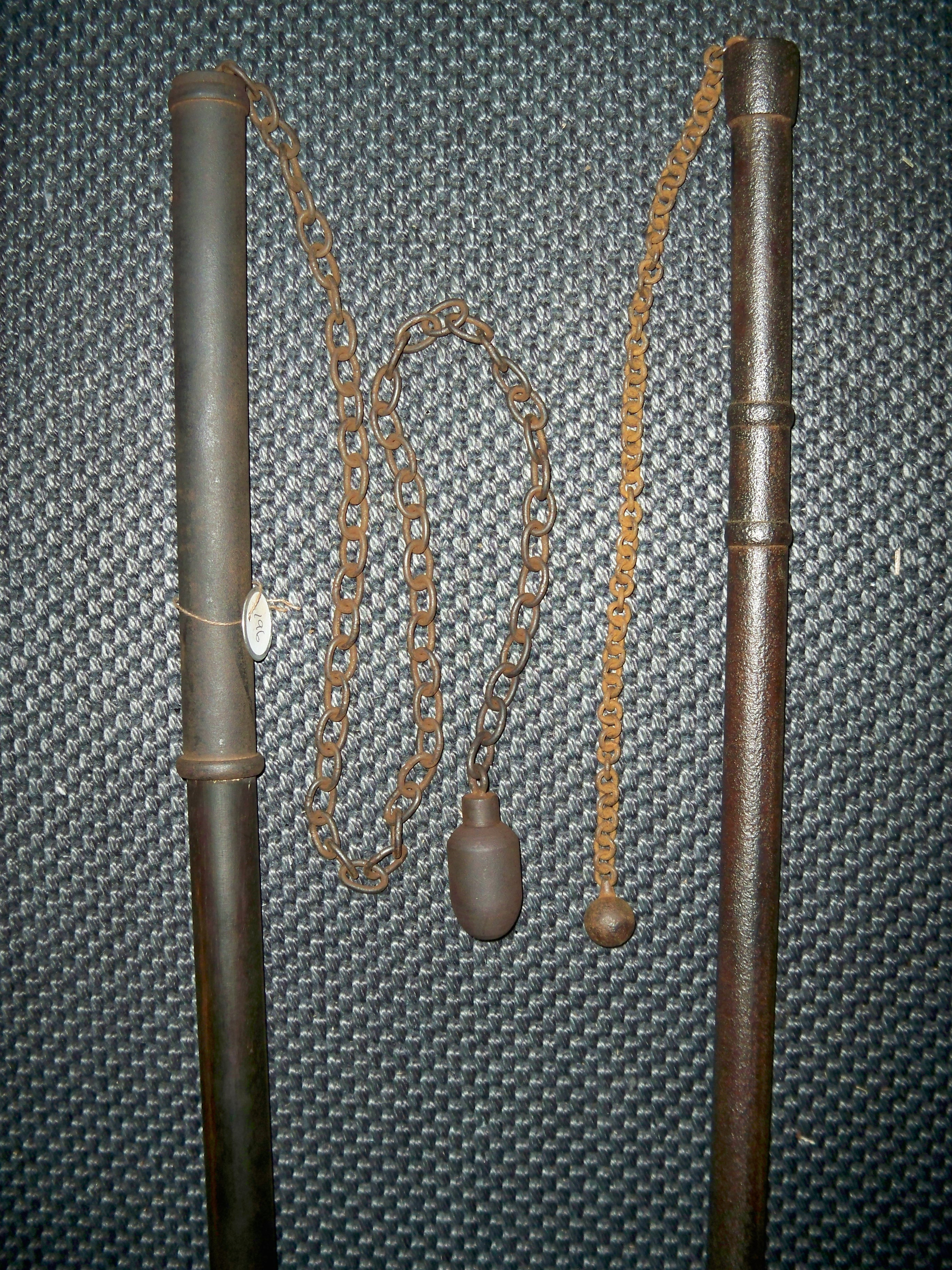
Two Japanese chigiriki, chain and weight weapons, one with a hollow iron staff and one with a hollow wood and iron staff

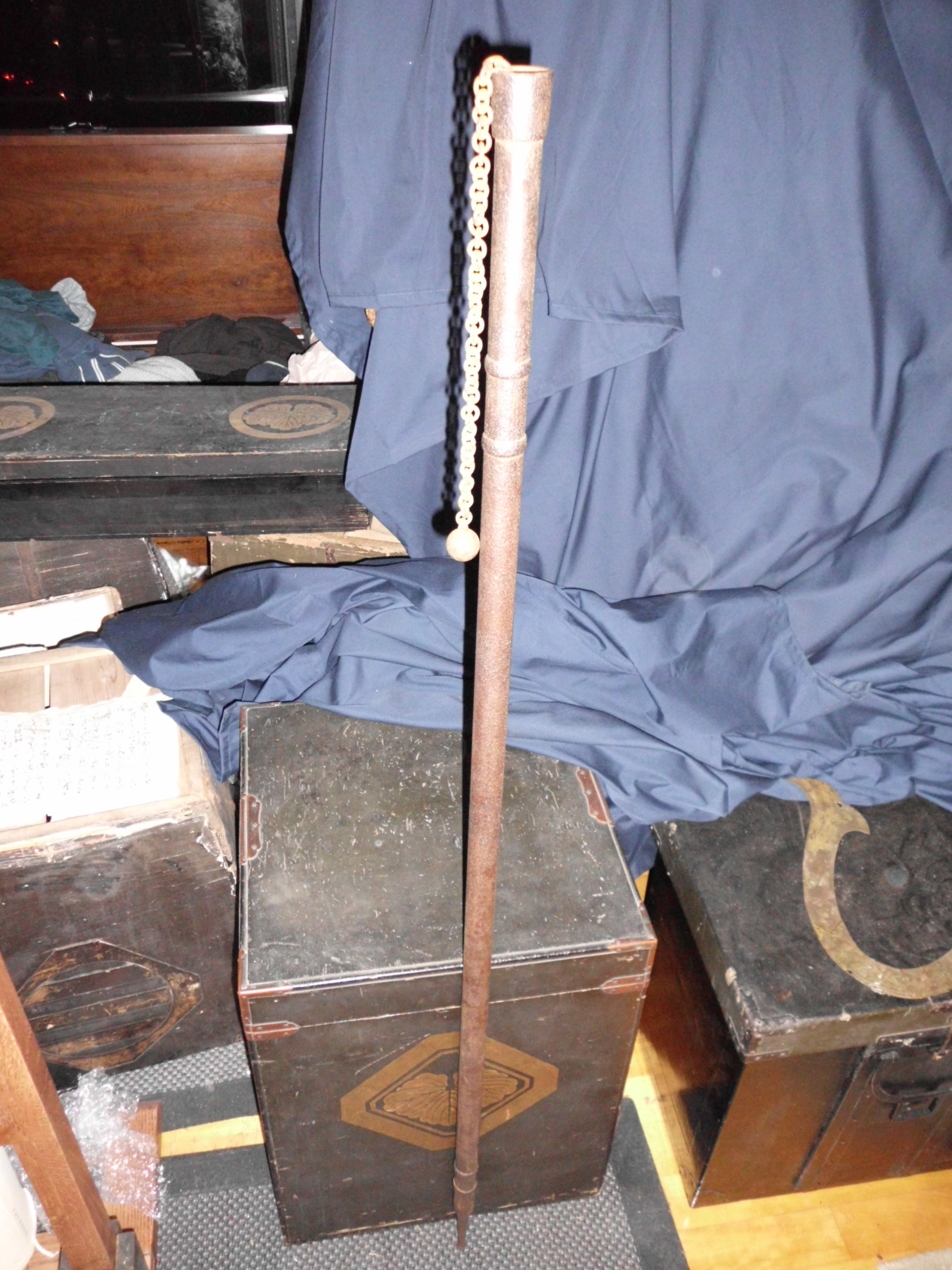
Japanese tetsu chigiriki, a hollow iron cane that has an iron weight attached to a chain hidden inside

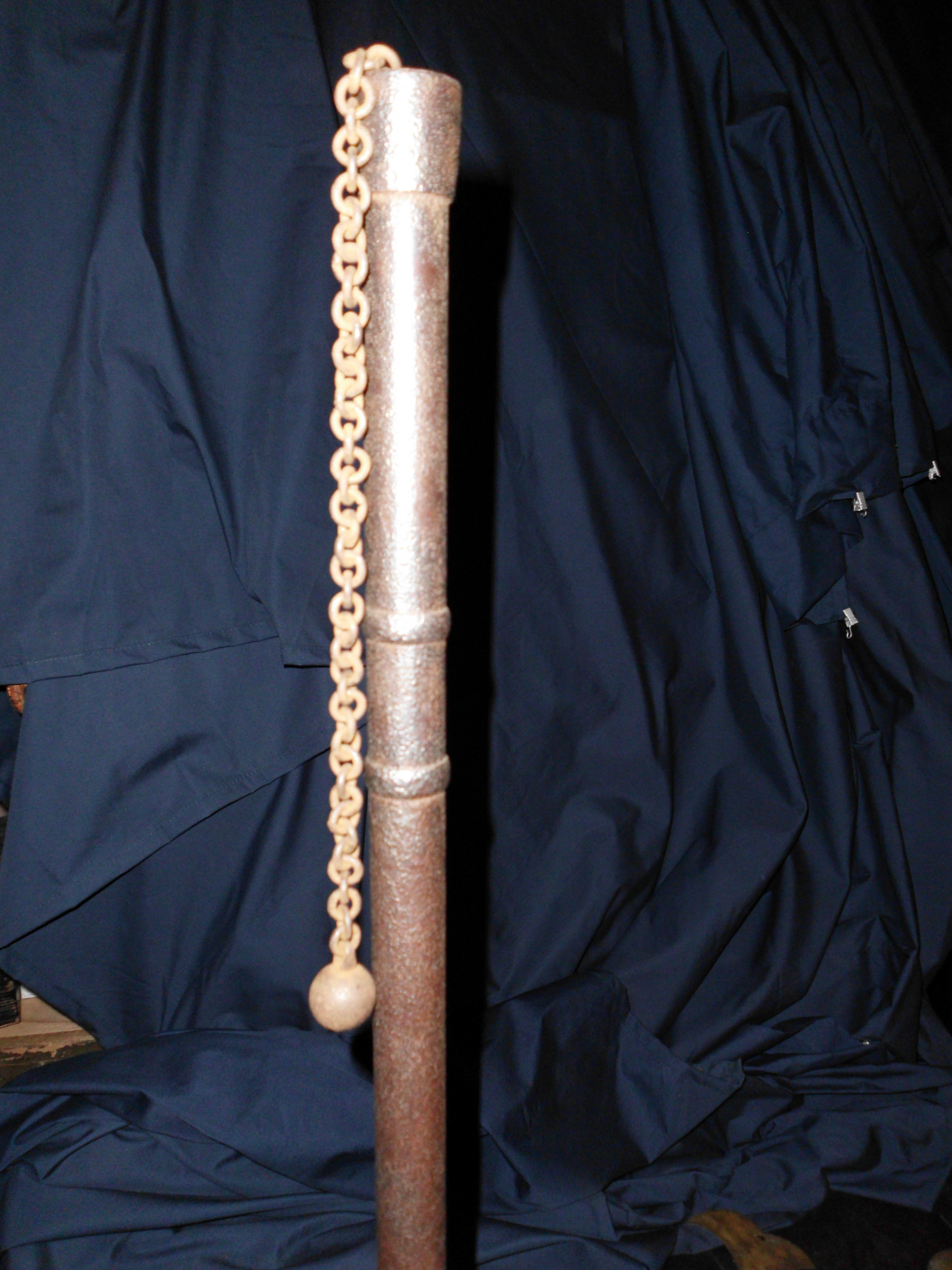
Japanese tetsu chigiriki, a hollow iron cane that has an iron weight attached to a chain hidden inside

== See also ==
- Flail (weapon)
- Saihai
