= Kusari-fundo =

Japanese weapon of a chain with weights

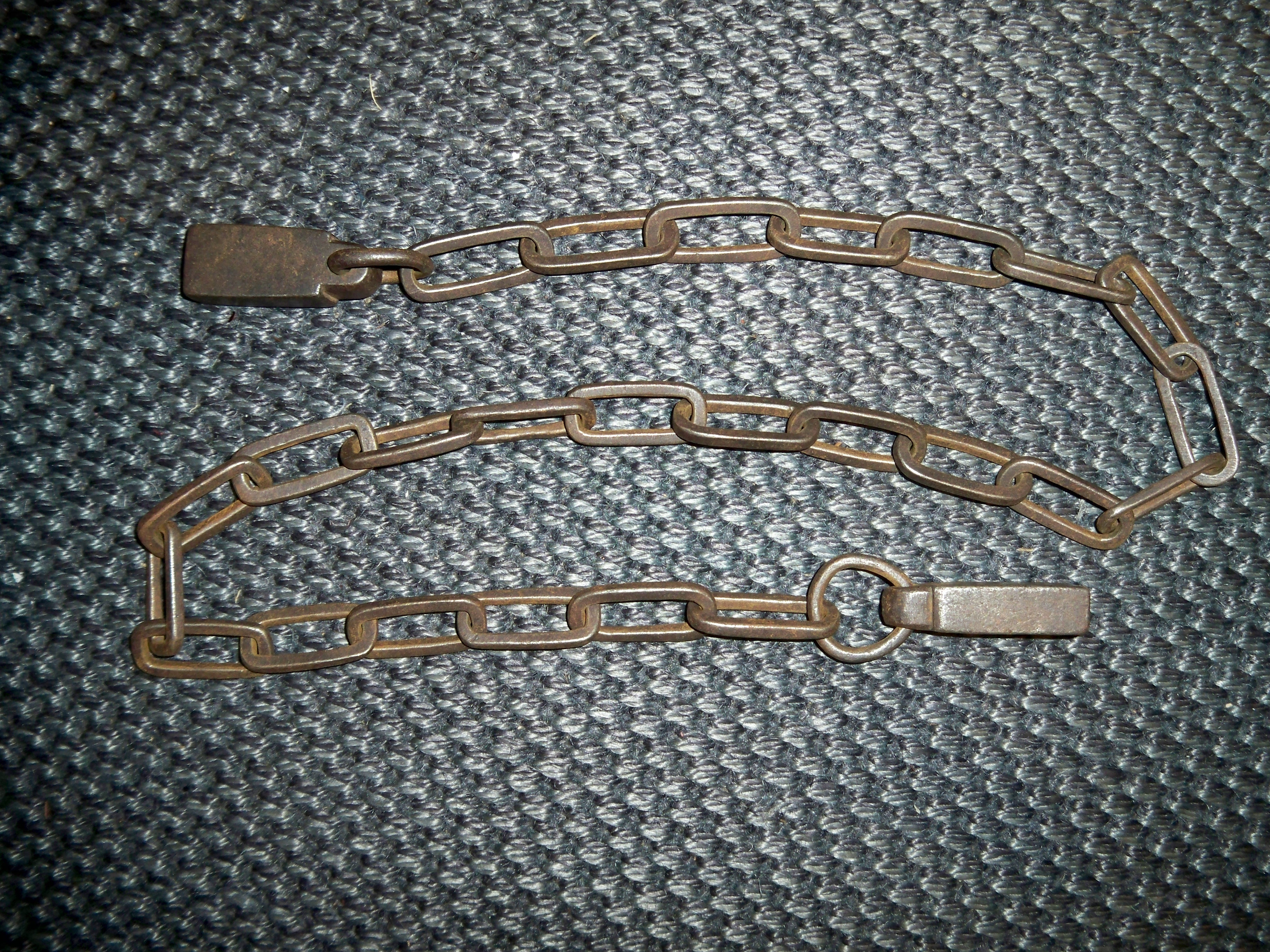
Antique Japanese kusari fundo/manriki

Kusari-fundo (鎖分銅) is a handheld weapon used in feudal Japan consisting of a length of chain (kusari) with a weight (fundo) attached to each end of the chain. Various sizes and shapes of chain and weight were used as there was no set rule on the construction of these weapons. Other popular names are manrikigusari (萬力鏈) (lit. 'ten-thousand-power chain') or just manriki.

== Parts ==
=== The chain (kusari) ===
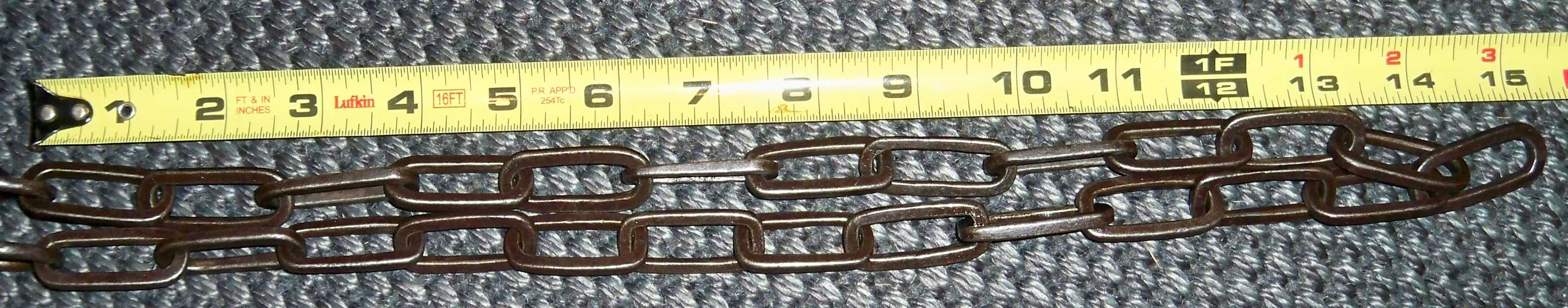
The chain (kusari) of a kusari fundo.

Typically the length of the forged chain could vary from around 12 inches (30 cm) up to 48 inches (120 cm). The chain links could have many different shapes including round, elliptical, and egg-shaped. The thickness of the chain also varied. Usually the first link of chain attached to the weight was round and often larger and thicker than the rest of the links of the chain.

=== The weight (fundo) ===
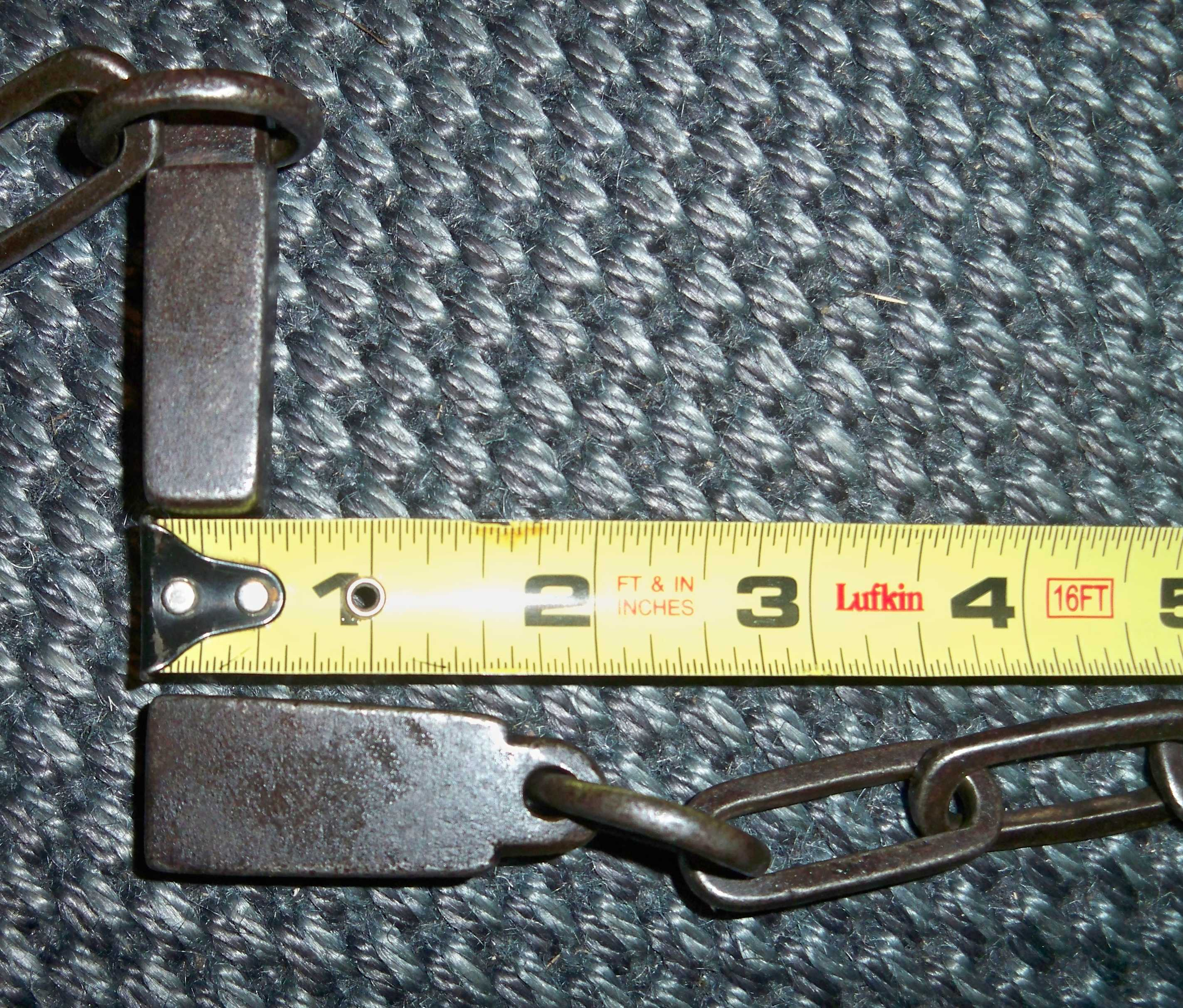
The weight (fundo) of a kusari fundo

The weight attached to each end of the chain could have many different sizes and shapes. The weights usually exactly matched each other in size and shape. On some of the related chain-and-weight weapons, the weights could be completely different from each other, with one weight much longer than the other, like a handle on one end, or one weight could be round while the other weight could be rectangular. Weight shapes include round, hexagonal, or rectangular. The weight could be fairly light or quite heavy, with the typical weight ranging from 2 ounces (56 grams) to 4 ounces (112 grams).

== Use ==
The use of the kusari-fundo was taught in several different schools, or ryū (流), as a hidden or concealed weapon and also as a self-defense weapon. The kusari-fundo was useful when carrying a sword was not allowed or impractical, and samurai police of the Edo period would often use a kusari-fundo as one of their non-lethal arresting weapons.

== History ==
There are several chain and weight weapons. One type known as a konpi is mentioned in manuscripts as far back as the Nanboku-chō period (1336–1392).

Masaki Tarōdayū Dannoshin Toshiyoshi (1689–1776), founder of the Masaki-ryū, is said to have developed a version of the kusari-fundo while serving Lord Toda, as a bloodless weapon that could be used to defend the grounds of Edo Castle.

== Legality ==
In the Republic of Ireland, the kusari-fundo (manrikigusari) is classified as an illegal offensive weapon.

In Massachusetts in the United States, carrying a manrikigusari in public is considered a felony.

== Image gallery ==
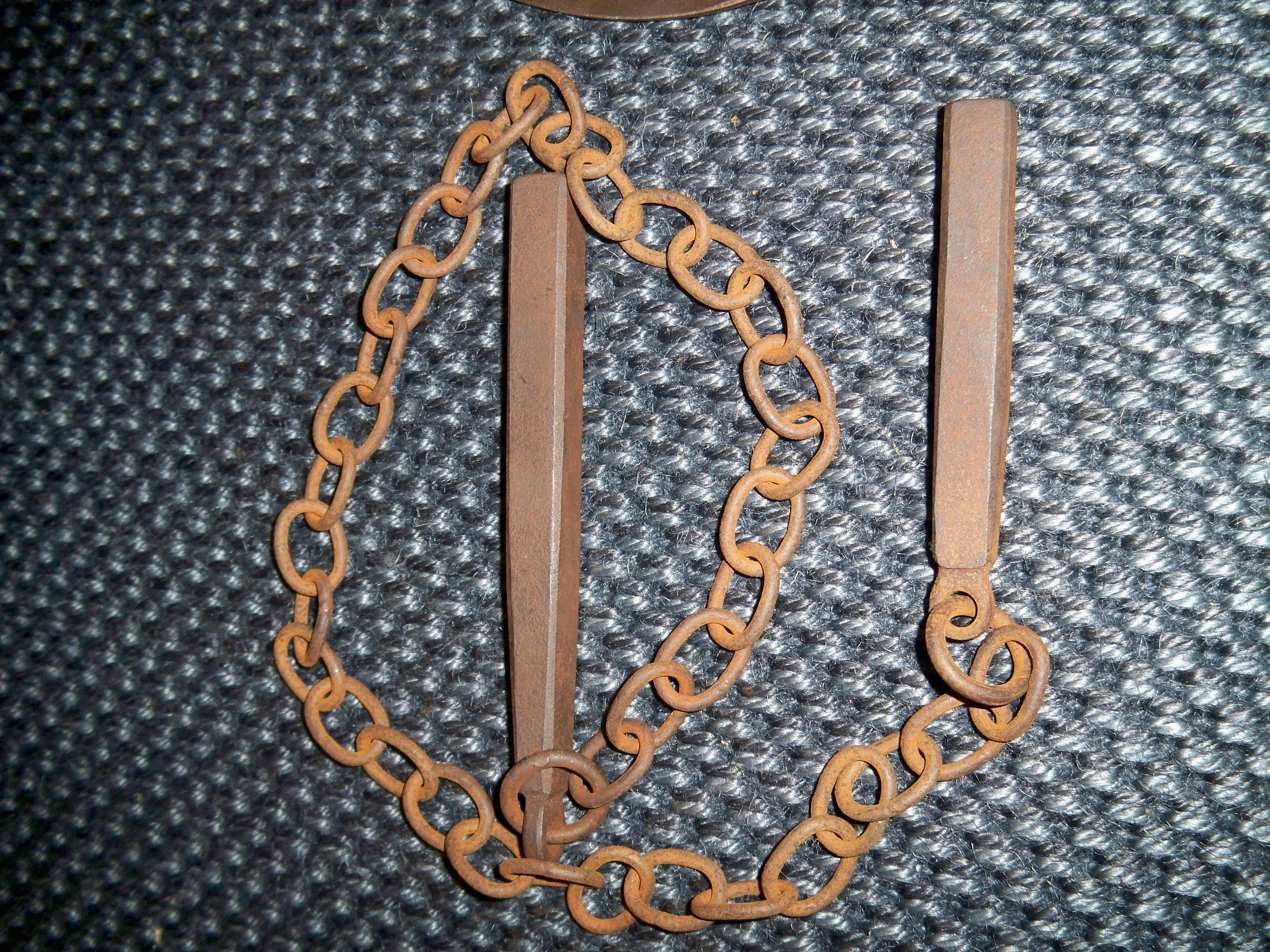
A replica kusari fundo

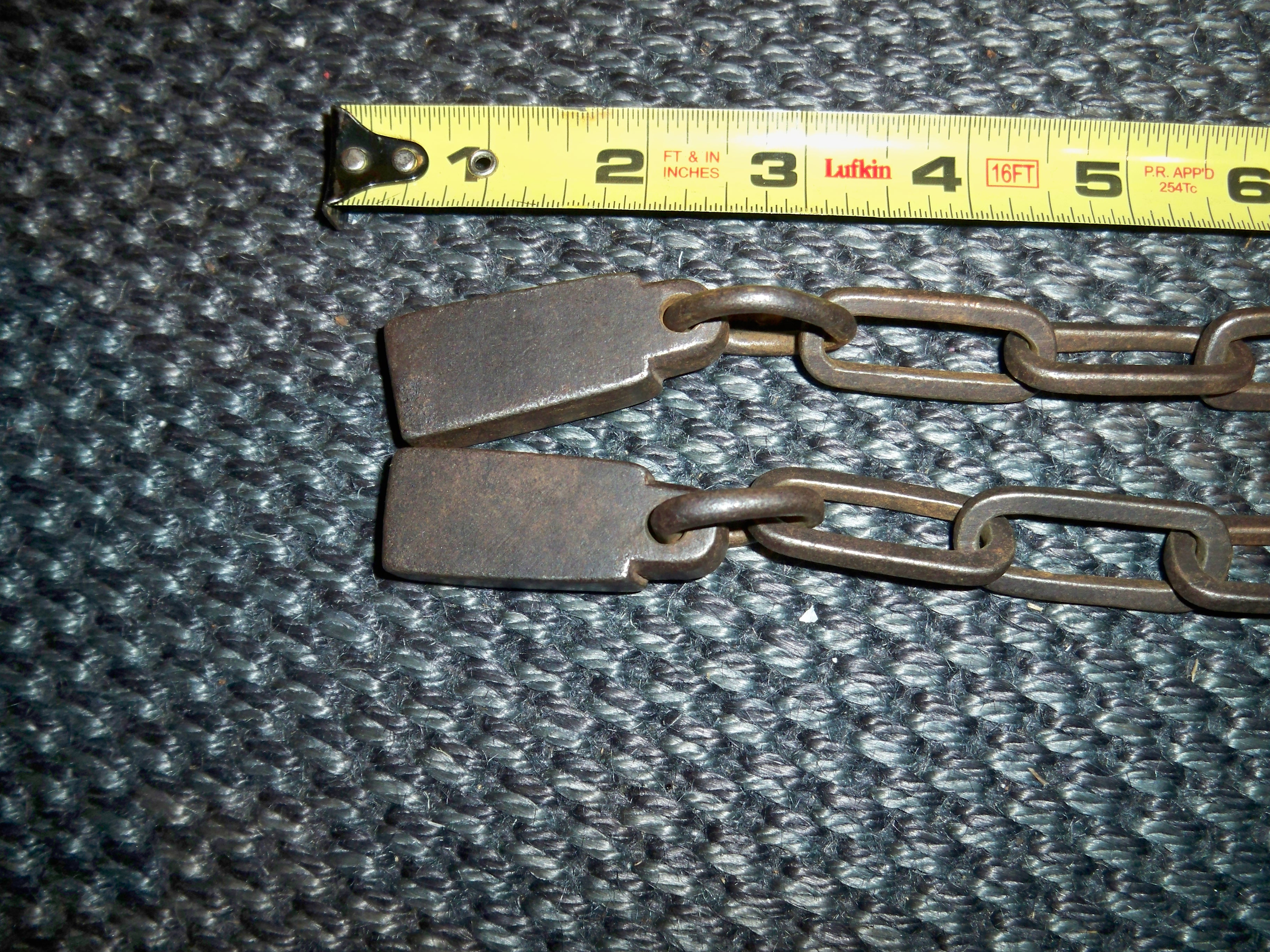
An antique kusari-fundo. Close-up of the weight (fundo).

== Popular culture ==
- Teenage Mutant Ninja Turtles features kusari-fundos being used by Karai and the Foot Clan.
- Rise of the Teenage Mutant Ninja Turtles features a mystical kusari-fundo as the character Michelangelo's main weapon of choice.
- Sluggy Freelance has a character named Kusari who uses the weapon.

== See also ==
- Kusarigama
- Meteor hammer
- Nunchaku
- Surujin
