= Rope dart =

Weapon in Chinese martial arts

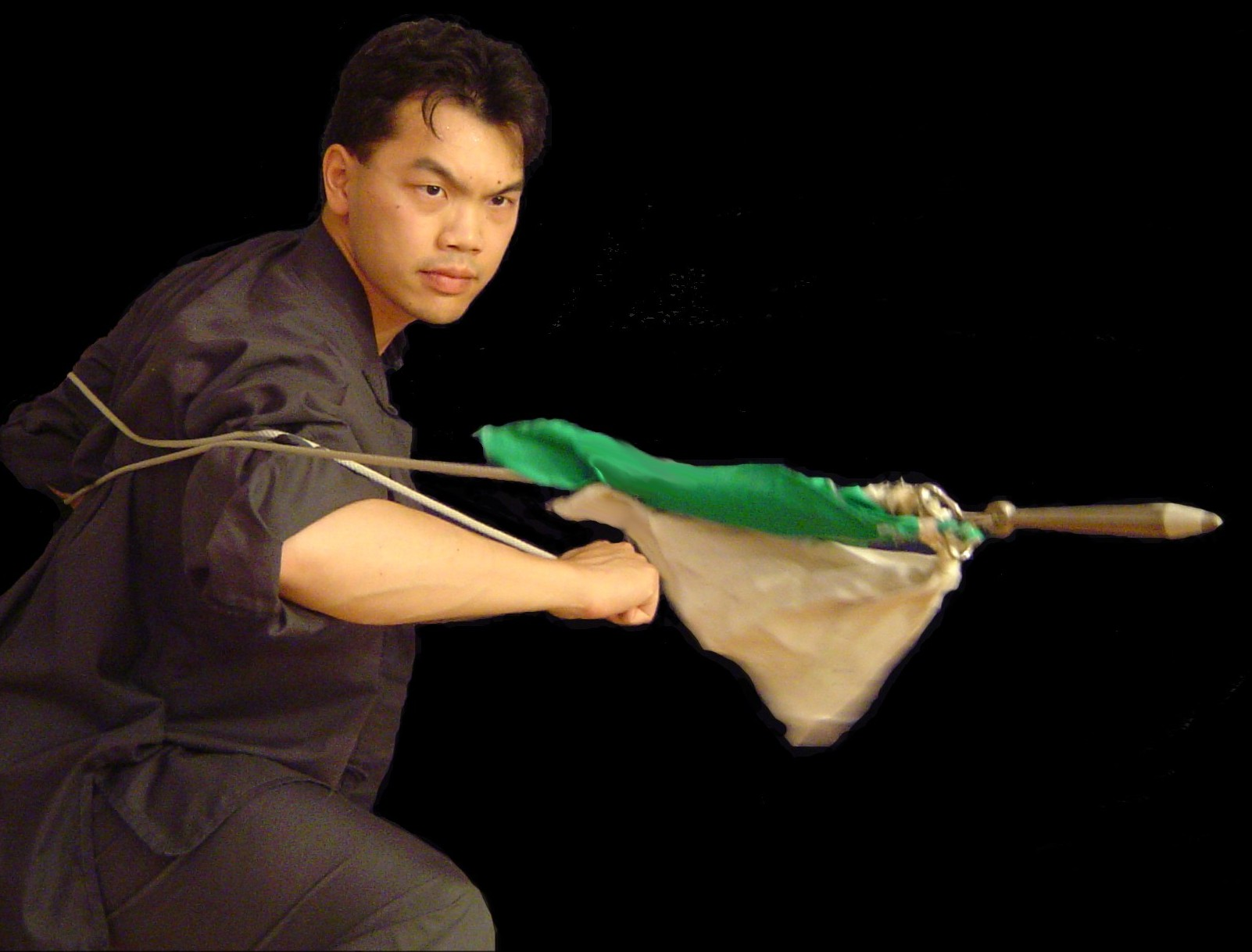
Demonstration of the use of a rope dart

The rope dart or rope javelin (simplified Chinese: 绳镖; traditional Chinese: 繩鏢; pinyin: shéng biāo, Japanese: 縄鏢 or 縄標: Jōhyō), is one of the flexible weapons in Chinese martial arts. Other weapons in this family include the meteor hammer, flying claws, and chain whip. It consists of a metal spike attached to the end of a 3–5-metre (10–16 ft) long rope.

== History ==
The earliest known reference to the rope dart as a distinct weapon from the meteor hammer or flying claw is a drawing in a 19th-century book about street vendors in Beijing. The context and items in this drawing as well as photographs from the early 20th century of similar content suggest these rope darts are intended for use in performance art. These early versions are shown with bamboo tubes that function as a sliding handle.

== Usage ==
Rope dart play consists of spinning, shooting, and retrieval. One end of the rope, usually a loop or slipknot, is held in or tied to the non-dominant hand to serve as an anchor, while the dominant hand is used to guide the rope, often moving along the length. The dart is kept in near constant motion and the user not only uses both hands, but their arms, legs and neck as part of the manipulation process. A typical action involves using momentum of the dart to wind the rope around specific body parts, using principles of angular momentum to build up speed, and then carefully timing a release to send the dart flying out in a straight line, followed quickly by retrieval. Just like the chain whip, excellent hand-eye coordination is a must for the practitioner to use the rope dart well. In some Wushu training regimens, the chain whip and Changquan are prerequisites for learning the rope dart.

== Construction ==
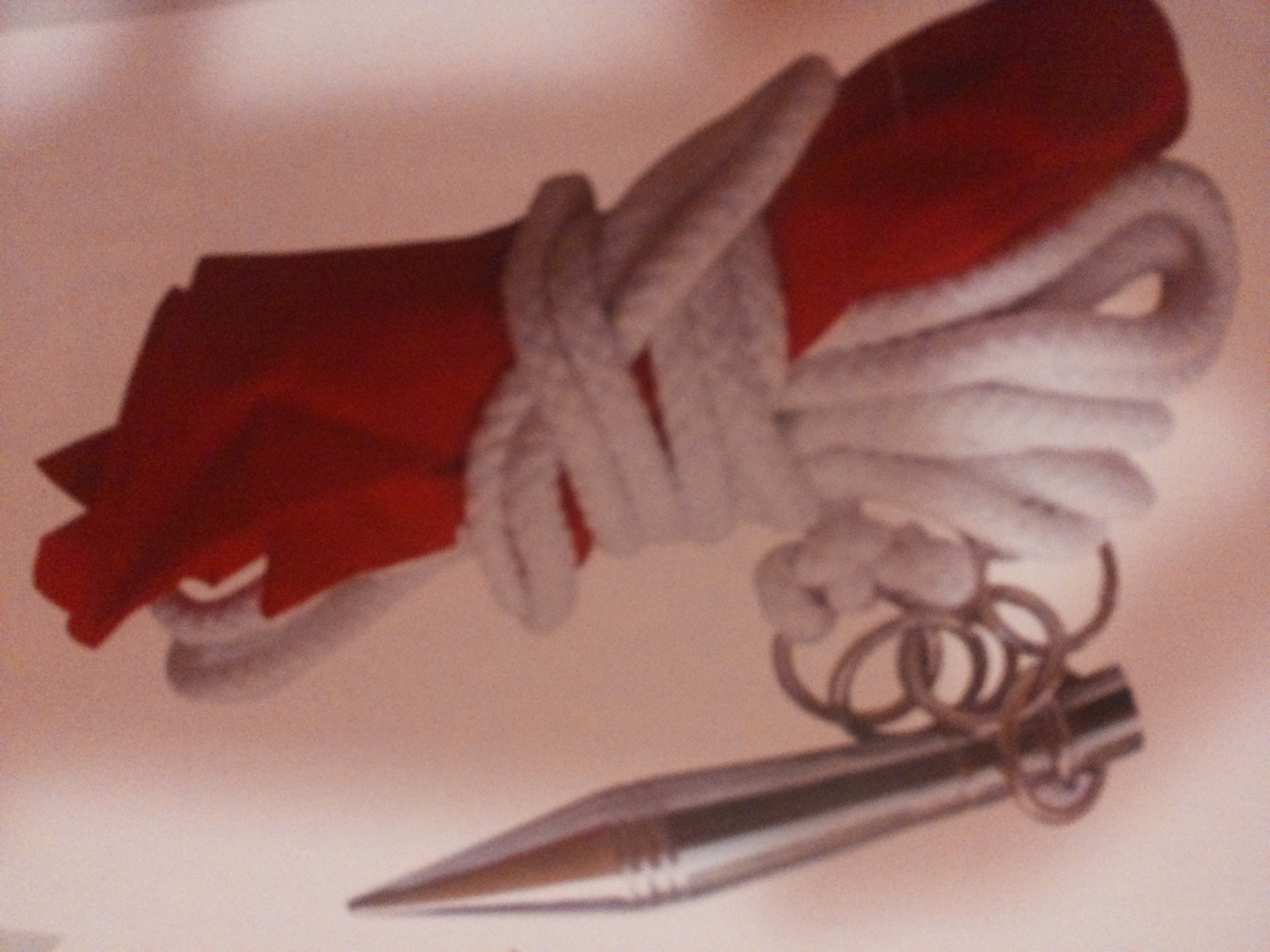
A metal rope dart

The dart is made of a hard material, usually iron or steel. It can be of variable weight depending on the users preference, and can be variable in shape (conical, triangular prism, pentagonal prism) and is typically blunted. The dart head has a ring or hole at the base which connects to small number of links for attaching to the rope, though some simple variants tie the rope directly to the dart head.

Traditionally, the rope was constructed from Chinese rope and covered with wax to minimize friction. In modern times, the rope is often made of a softer synthetic material and covered with talc powder or some other substance to reduce friction. Some less common variants substitute a fine chain for the rope, though this can be uncomfortable for the user due to the friction. It is common for a cloth flag or ribbon to be attached to the rings or directly to the dart head. These provide a visual for the audience to see the dart's movement as well as creating aerodynamic drag to slow the dart's movement, which helps the user maintain control of it.

Older versions had the rope pass through a bamboo tube which was held in the user's dominant hand. This functioned as a handle that could slide along the rope's length, as well as protecting the user's hand from friction burns. It is speculated these fell out of use with the introduction of modern rope materials that have lower friction.

== As performance art ==
While relatively new, rope dart is used in the object manipulation scenes due to its impressive performances. Because of this, there have been modifications to the original design. Some rope darts have been created to be set alight. A section of fireproof chain or Technora rope between the dart or meteor head and the rope attaches it securely and Kevlar wicks form the flammable head. Other rope darts have heads filled with LED lights. Both of these can be performed in the dark, adding excitement and mystery.[citation needed]

== In popular culture ==
=== Television and film ===
- In season one of America's Got Talent: Extreme, William Brandon performed a fire dance with a rope dart.
- In the Marvel Cinematic Universe film Shang-Chi and the Legend of the Ten Rings, Shang-Chi’s younger sister Xialing teaches herself how to use a rope dart in secret after their father Wenwu forbids her from training with the other men of the Ten Rings. After traveling to Ta Lo, Xialing acquires a rope dart made from dragon scales.

=== Video games ===
- In the Assassin's Creed series, the rope dart appears as a tool in several games, which can be used for either navigation or to assassinate enemies, typically via hanging or impalement. The character Shao Jun, a 16th-century Chinese Assassin, is credited with its invention, and Ratonhnhaké:ton, Edward Kenway, Adéwalé, Shay Cormac, Arbaaz Mir, and Eivor Varinsdottir also employ rope darts or similar tools in their respective games.
- In the Mortal Kombat series, the character Scorpion uses a rope dart.
- In The King of Fighters XI, the character Shion uses a rope dart as a sub-weapon.
- In Destiny 2, the Hunter class uses a rope dart as a melee weapon as well as their super ability when using the Strand subclass.
- The rope dart appears as a usable weapon in Dynasty Warriors: Origins and Where Winds Meet.

== See also ==
- Aklys – Roman weapon of similar construction
- List of martial arts weapons
- Slungshot – a rope with a weighted end, far shorter, though similar in construction
- Suruchin – Okinawan weapon of similar construction
