= Slungshot =

Maritime tool consisting of a weight attached to a cord

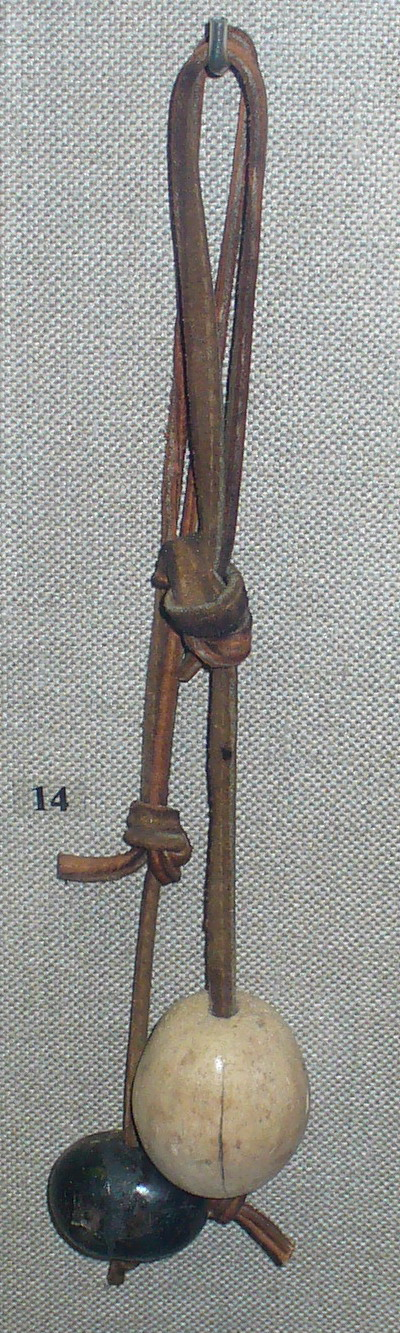
Analog of slungshot.

A slungshot is a maritime tool consisting of a weight, or "shot", affixed to the end of a long cord often by being wound into the center of a knot called a "monkey's fist". It is used to cast line from one location to another, often mooring line. The cord end is tied to the heavier line and the weighted end of the slungshot is thrown across the intervening space where a person picks it up and pulls the line across.

== As a weapon ==
The slungshot was often used as a civilian or improvised weapon; however, the rope was much shorter for use as a weapon. The cord is tied around the wrist, and the weight is carried in the hand or the pocket of the user. A slungshot may be swung in a manner similar to that of a flail or a blackjack.

=== In China and Japan ===
Slungshots were also used in China and Japan, under other names and were sometimes weighted on both ends, such as with Kusari-fundo, manrikigusari, and other variants. A variant called "loaded sleeves," consisted of weights concealed in long, flowing sleeves.

Robert van Gulik stated in the postscript of his book The Willow Pattern A Judge Dee Mystery, that in 1935 when he was in Peking, he was told how "loaded sleeves" facilitated an unexpected escape for a group of foreign nuns threatened by a mob during an anti-Western uprising in China. The cornered nuns, believing they were going to be killed, reportedly raised their hands to pray. The people standing nearest incorrectly identified the bulky objects in the upraised folds of cloth, interpreting them to be dangerous "loaded sleeves". They backed away, opening a path through the crowd, and the nuns escaped. The bulky objects were their breviaries, which the nuns habitually carried in the sleeves of their robes.

=== United States ===
Abraham Lincoln's most notable criminal trial occurred in 1858 when he successfully defended "Duff" Armstrong on a charge of killing another with a slung shot. They were widely used by criminals and street gang members in the 19th century as they had the advantage of being easy to make, silent, and very effective, particularly against an unsuspecting opponent. This gave them a dubious reputation, similar to that of switchblade knives in the 1950s, and they were outlawed in many jurisdictions. The use as a criminal weapon continued at least up until the early 1920s.

Carrying a slungshot or having one on one's person is a crime in the states of California, Oklahoma, Massachusetts, Michigan, Nevada, Washington, Minnesota, New Hampshire., and Vermont (when intending to use as a weapon). In March 2016, Florida repealed its longstanding first-degree misdemeanor law forbidding the carrying of a concealed slungshot.
