= Chain whip =

Chinese weapon of martial arts

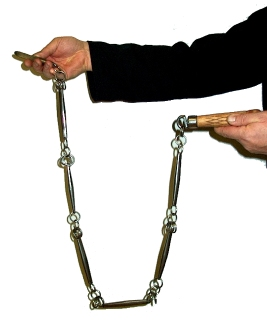
An example of a chain whip

The chain whip, also known as the soft whip, is a weapon used in some Chinese martial arts, particularly traditional Chinese disciplines, in addition to modern and traditional wushu. It consists of several metal rods, which are joined end-to-end by rings to form a flexible chain. Generally, the whip has a handle at one end and a metal dart, used for slashing or piercing an opponent, at the other. A cloth flag is often attached at or near the dart end of the whip and a second flag may cover the whip's handle. The flag or flags adds visual appeal and produces a rushing sound as the whip swings through the air. The rushing noise also helps the user with identifying the location of the other end, since the weapon moves too fast to be normally noticed by human eyes.

== Construction ==
There is no standard on the length of the chain whip. The typical length is also different between north and south China. The chain is shorter in the south which make it more suitable for close quarter fighting. In the north the length could be from the ground to the chin or the ground to the tip of the nose. Weight is heavier for practice and lighter for performance.

The cloth flag could be either rectangular or triangular. Triangular flags look better and move faster but rectangular flags sound better and allow better control.

The number of segments vary. Traditional whips have either seven or nine segments. Modern whips typically have between seven and thirteen sections.

Most whips today are made from stainless steel. With good whips, there is better color and shine to the metal, segments are stylized, holes are precisely centered, the chain rotates smoothly in the swivel built into the handle, there are no sharp corners or edges, and welds are strong. In addition, the handle should be shaped to allow good grip. Leather on the handles is best for endurance, as it absorbs sweat and prevents slippage. The typical construction method for chain whips is to use a steel bolt to thread through small pieces of leather and then use a lathe to round and shape the handle. The tip should be larger than the segments and weight proportional to the handle. Shape and weight distribution should allow the chain to be easily tossed and retrieved into one hand.

== History ==
According to the book Soft Weapons: Nine-Section Whip and Rope Dart, "The nine-section whip, regarded as a 'powerful hidden weapon,' was first used on the battlefield during the Jìn Dynasty (265-420) [sic.]."

According to the book The Chain Whip, this may refer to the hard whip (more akin to a truncheon than a multi-section whip) due to the ambiguity in the Chinese. "Both the hard whip and the soft whip can both be referred to simply as whip (鞭) in Chinese." Different books make wildly differing claims about the history of the Chain Whip.

== Techniques ==
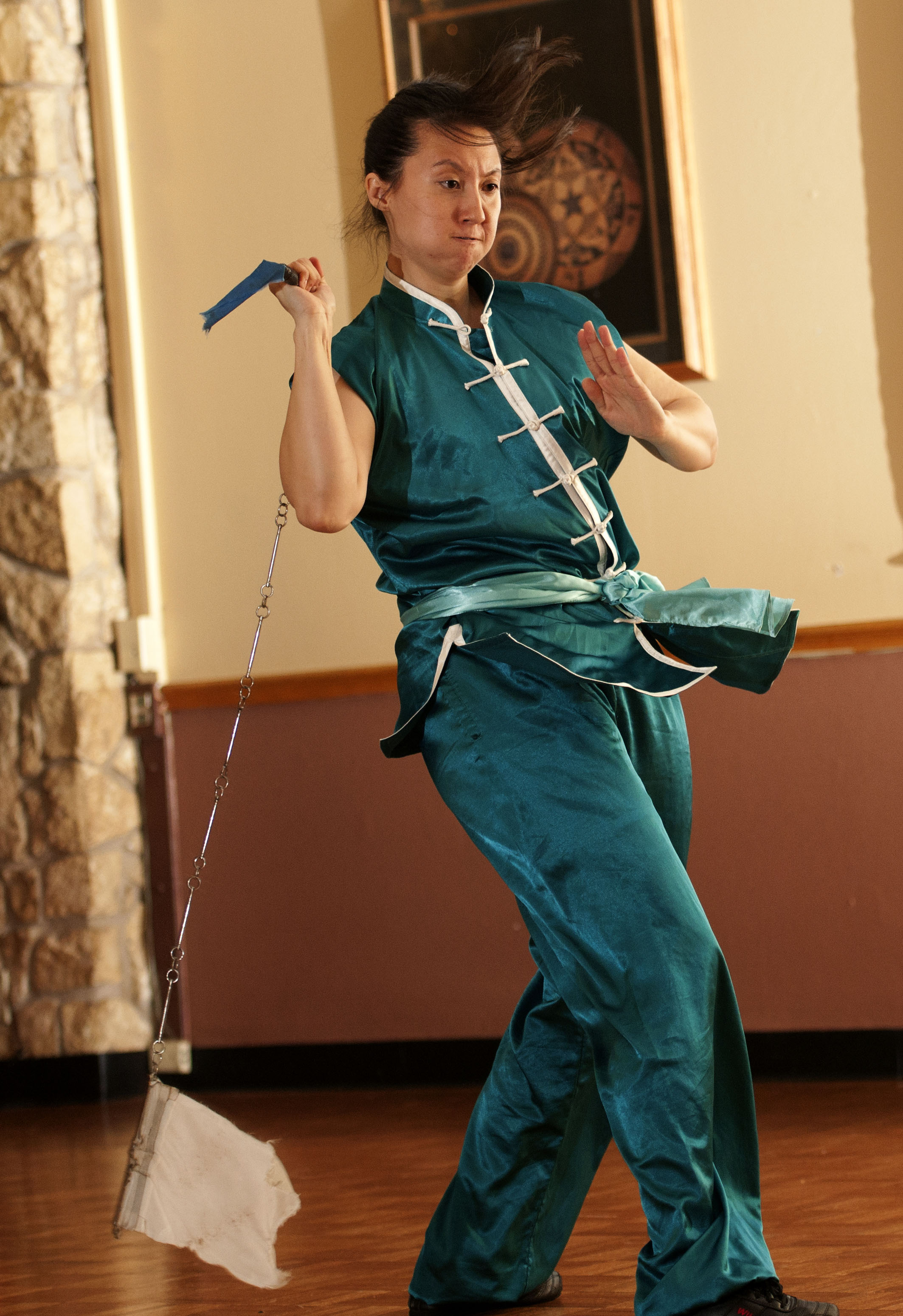
Demonstration of the chain whip being performed.

The chain whip is heavy but flexible, allowing it to be used as a whip to hit, hook and bind an opponent, restrict their movement, and to deflect blows from other weapons. The dart is used for slashing or piercing an opponent. In some cases, the dart might be coated with a poison. Because the whip is flexible, it can be used to strike around obstacles, including an opponent's block. The whip chain can be folded and hidden from view, making it an easy weapon to carry and conceal.

Chain whip forms are often extremely elaborate. In some, the chain whip is thrown in the air and caught, flicked around the neck, or flung around underneath a recumbent performer. One classic technique, used to accelerate a spinning chain whip, involves rapidly wrapping, and unwrapping the length of the chain around various parts of the body, including the legs, neck and elbows. Various twisting or flicking motions cause the chain whip to gain momentum as it unwraps. In practice, wrapping then unwrapping is used to change the direction of the spin in response to the opponent's movement.

Chain whip techniques may be combined with jumping kicks and other acrobatics. Double chain whip forms have been developed, as have forms in which a chain whip is coupled with a broadsword.

For performance the chain whip can be used to perform meteor moves such as one hand or two hand meteor rotors and weaves. At the end of the performance the chain whip segments can be pulled and collected into the hand holding the handle.

As with all weapons that are either chained or tied together, the whip chain is hard to control without practice. In fact, it is harder to control than a traditional rawhide or bull whip because the linked sections provide looser joints while a bull whip is a continuous piece. The chain whip is sometimes considered one of the hardest weapons in martial arts to learn because lapse in the control of body movements in coordination with the position and momentum of the weapon will likely result in the weapon striking the wielder.

== Chain whip variations ==
- Jiǔjiébiān (九節鞭) – nine-section whip
- Qījiébiān (七節鞭) – seven–section whip
- Sānjiébiān (三節鞭) or měihuābiān (梅花鞭) – three-section whip or plum flower whip

== See also ==
- Bian (weapon)
- Meteor hammer
- Rope dart
- Urumi
- Weapons of pencak silat
