= Bolas =

Type of weighted throwing weapon used in South America

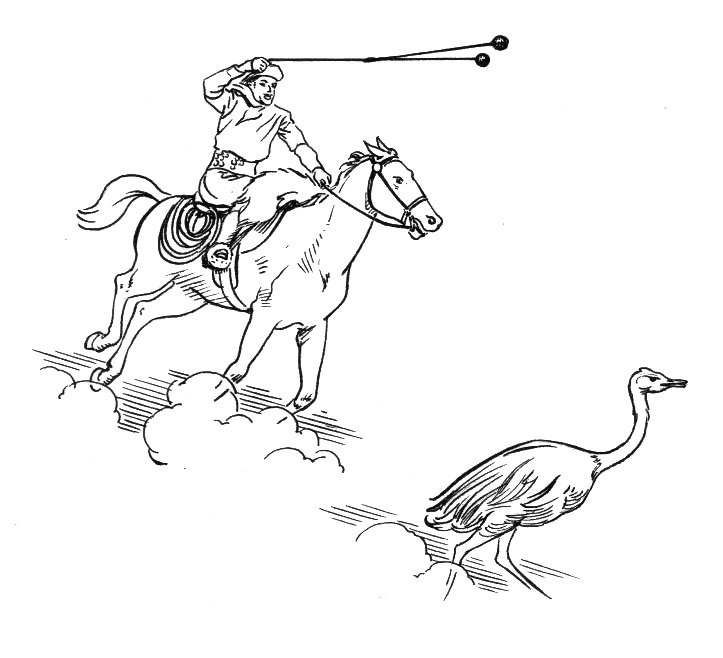
- A hunter using bolas while mounted on a horse.
- Type: Throwing weapon
- Place of origin: The Americas

Bolas or bolases (sing.: bola; from Spanish and Portuguese bola, "ball", also known as a boleadora or boleadeira) is a type of throwing weapon made of weights on the ends of interconnected cords, used to capture animals by entangling their legs. Bolas were most famously used by the gauchos, but have been found in excavations of Pre-Columbian settlements, especially in Patagonia, where indigenous peoples (particularly the Tehuelche) used them to catch 200-pound guanacos and rheas. The Mapuche and the Inca army used them in battle. Mapuche warriors used bolas in their confrontations with the Chilean Army during the Occupation of Araucanía (1861–1883).

== Use ==
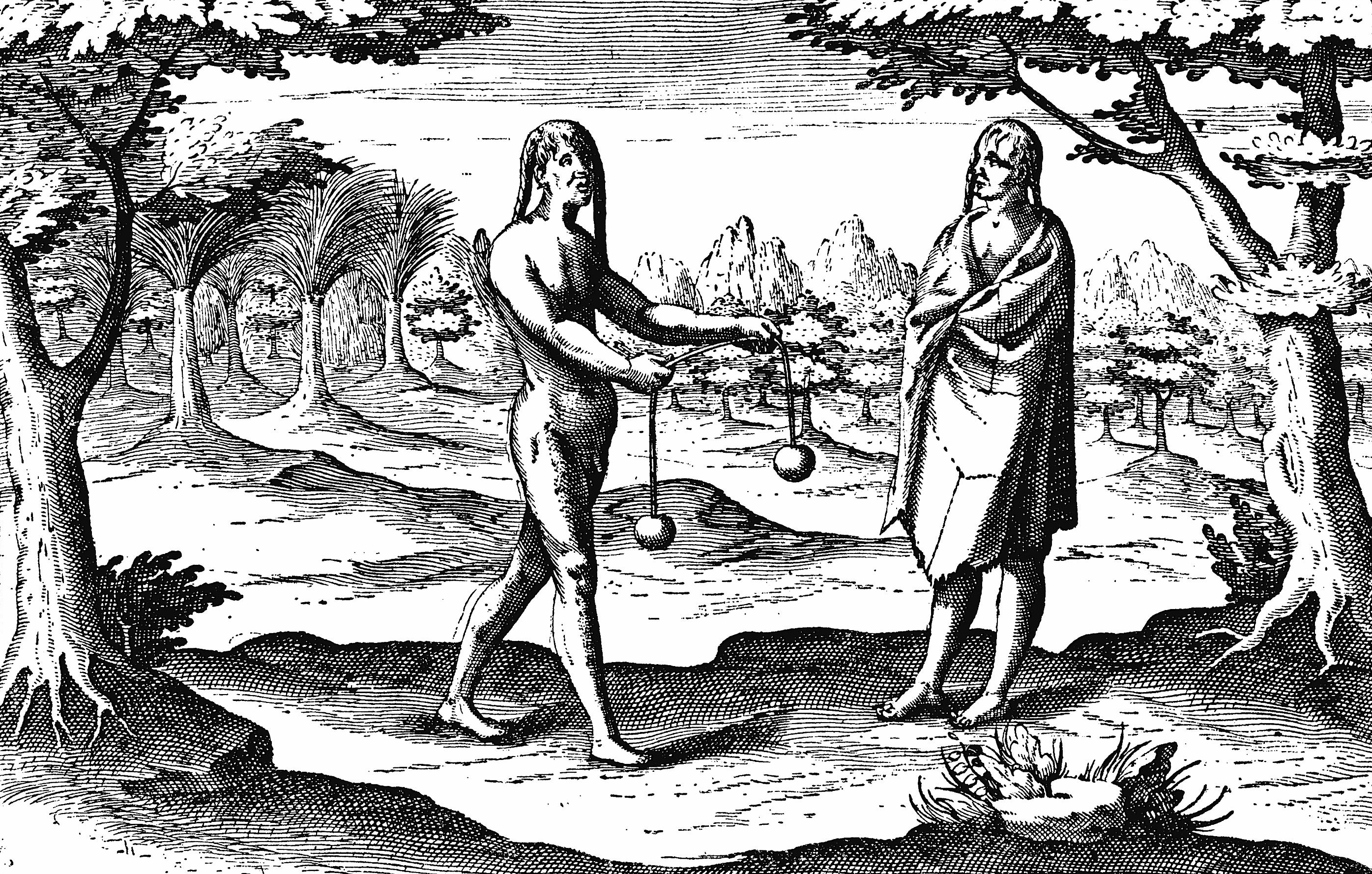
River Plate Indians with bolas (Hendrick Ottsen, 1603)

Gauchos used boleadoras to capture running cattle or game. Depending on the exact design, the thrower grasps the boleadora by one of the weights or by the nexus of the cords. The thrower gives the balls momentum by swinging them and then releases the boleadora. The weapon is usually used to entangle the animal's legs, but when thrown with enough force can even inflict injury (e.g., by breaking a bone).

Traditionally, Inuit have used bolas to hunt birds, fowling the birds in air with the lines of the bola. People of a Feather showed Belcher Island Inuit using bolas to hunt eider ducks on the wing.

== Design ==
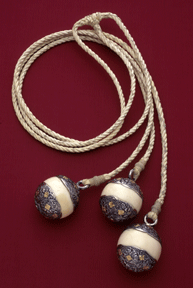
Boleadoras

There is no uniform design; most bolas have two or three balls, but there are versions of up to eight or nine. Some, but not all, bolas have balls of equal weight; some vary the knot and cord. Gauchos use bolas made of braided leather cords with wooden balls or small leather sacks full of stones at the ends of the cords.

Bolas can be named depending on the number of weights used:

- Perdida (one weight)
- Avestrucera or ñanducera (two weights, for rheas)
- Somai (two weights)
- Achico (three weights)
- Boleadora (three weights)
- Kiipooyaq (Inuit name for bolas with three or more weights)

Bolas of three weights are usually designed with two shorter cords with heavier weights, and one longer cord with a light weight. The heavier weights fly at the front parallel to each other, hit either side of the legs, and the lighter weight goes around, wrapping up the legs.

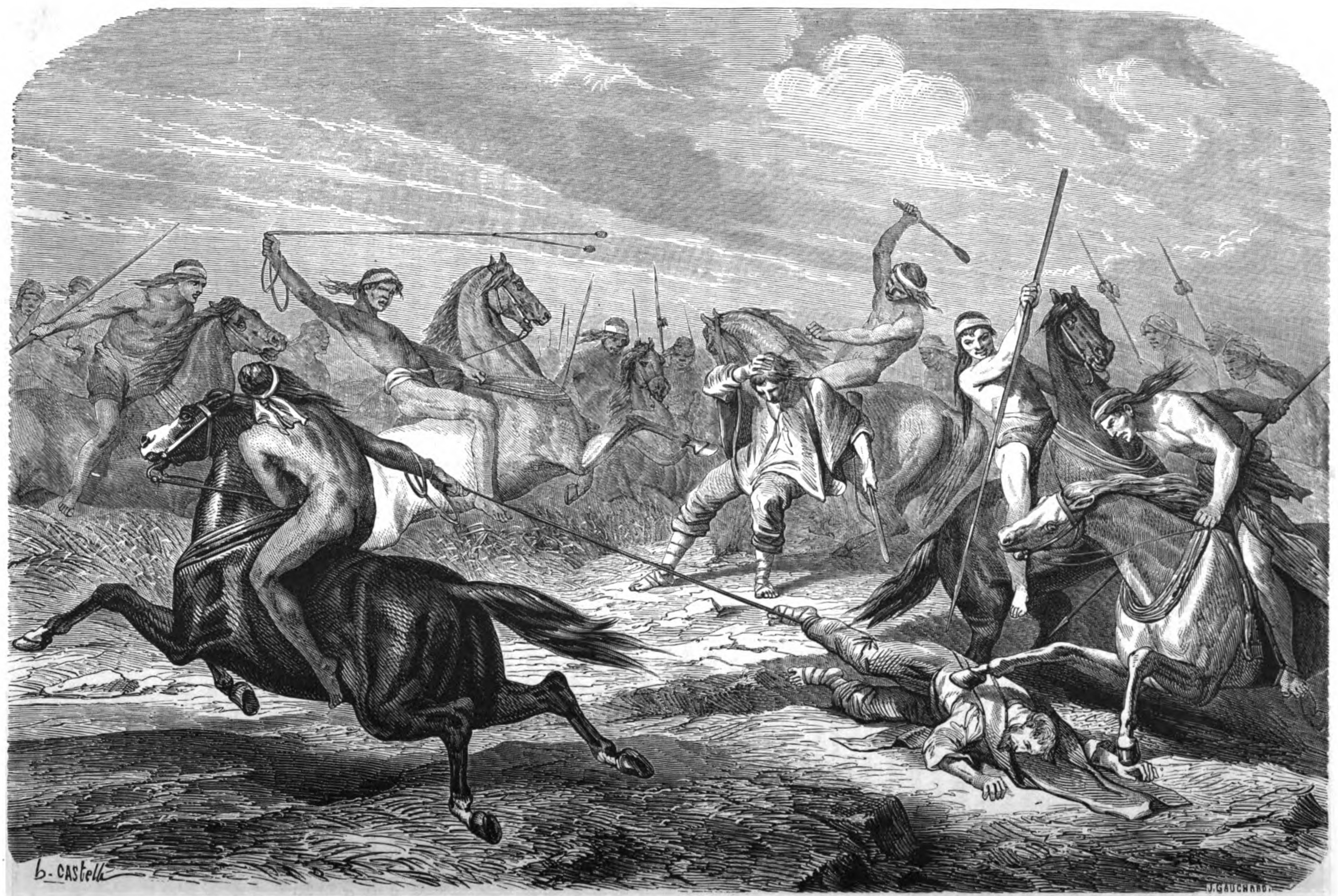
Puelche warriors using bolas in the 19th century

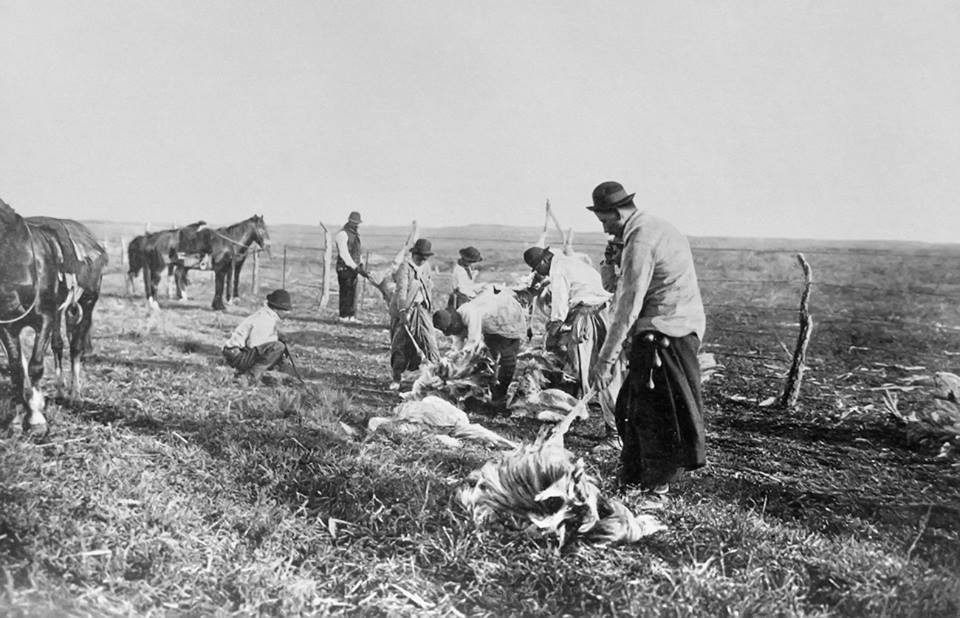
A group of gauchos hunting rheas with bolas in La Pampa, Argentina, 1905.

Other unrelated versions include qilumitautit, the bolas of the Inuit, made of sinew and bone weights and used to capture water birds.

== Popular culture ==
- At the "Anthropology Days" associated with the 1904 Summer Olympics, a "bolo throw" event was contested at Francis Olympic Field, where the top three finishers were all Tehuelche and the winning distance was 209 feet (64 m).
- In the series Zorro (1957), episode 33 of season 1: "The Deadly Bolas", features this weapon.
- In the anime Belle and Sebastian, episode 40: "Chained Belle" (ボーレアドーラの恐怖, Bōreadōra no kyōfu) shows an expert in the handling of bolas.
- The “bolas” refers to Joseph Joestar’s steel volley clackers, the Hamon-infused weapons he invents and uses throughout Battle Tendency.
- The fictional comic book character Batman, along with his allies known as the "Bat-Family", are often seen using bolas to capture criminals in Gotham City.
- In the 1979 James Bond film Moonraker, a bolas is featured as a weapon made by the Q Branch.
- In the How to Train Your Dragon film franchise, bolas are semi-frequently used as a dragon hunting weapon, to bind the wings and prevent flight.
- In Escape from L.A., bolas are used to knock Snake Plissken off the top of a vehicle during the "parade".
- In Return of the Jedi Ewoks use bolas in the battle against the Galactic Empire on the moon of Endor.
- In Tak 2: The Staff of Dreams, the player may use bolas as a utility in gameplay.
- In the 1984 movie Romancing the Stone, the character Elaine Wilder is knocked unconscious by a child who throws a bolas at her. She is then kidnapped by a child who uses the AC Cobra sports car she was driving to spirit her away.
- In Miraculous: Tales of Ladybug & Cat Noir, Juleka Couffaine uses the Tiger Miraculous to transform into Purple Tigress, whose miraculous weapon is a bolas.
- In Ark: Survival Evolved, bolas are used to incapacitate small to medium-sized dinosaurs, and are a staple of the Player Vs Player mode.
- In A Dark Room, the player can purchase or find bolas and use them as a projectile. When used, they stun enemies and make them unable to attack.
- In the 2003 film Kangaroo Jack, bolas are used to subdue the character Frankie Lombardo, preventing his escape and leading to his arrest.

== See also ==
- Bolas spiders, which swing a sticky web blob at the end of a web line to capture prey
- Bolo tie, a style of necktie resembling the bolas at the end of a string
- Eskimo yo-yo, a skill toy resembling fur-covered bolas or yo-yos
- Lasso or lariat, a looped rope used for similar purposes, especially in North America
- Meteor hammer and meteor, a Chinese melee weapon and a Chinese skill toy, both consisting of two weights connected by a rope or chain
- Poi, a Māori skill toy consisting of a ball attached to a tasseled cord
