= Tabak-Toyok =

Filipino flail weapon

The tabak-toyok (sometimes colloquially referred to as chako) is a Filipino flail weapon consisting of a pair of sticks connected by a chain. It is closely related to the Okinawan nunchaku, the primary difference being that the Filipino version tends to have shorter handles and a longer chain than its Okinawan counterpart, making it better suited for long range. Each handle is approximately 8–9 in (20–23 cm) long. The length of the rope or chain that connects the handles is approximately 4–7.5 in (10–19 cm), but the weapon's ideal size depends on the user. Because the small size of the tabak-toyok allows for easy concealment and bigger size allows for control, it is often used in street brawls in the Philippines.

Filipino martial artist Dan Inosanto teaches tabak-toyok techniques as part of his kali curriculum. He introduced the weapon to his friend and student, the martial artist and actor Bruce Lee. Lee would later become famous for using the similar nunchaku in his films.
