= Assassin's mace =

Legendary ancient Chinese weapon

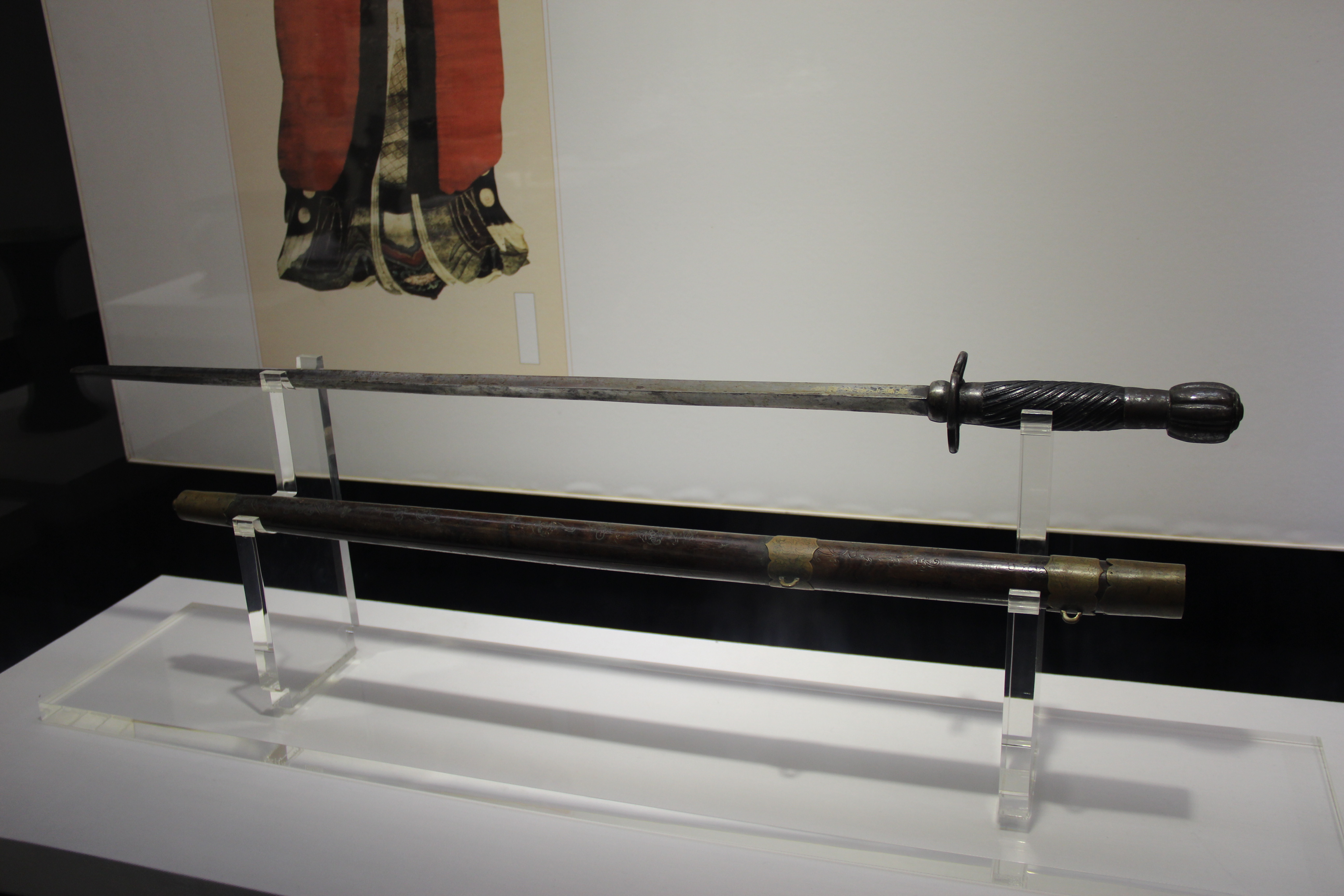
The assassin's mace of ancient China was a rectangular club designed to break sharp weapons in combat by hitting them

An assassin's mace (Chinese: 杀手锏; pinyin: Shāshǒujiǎn) is a legendary ancient Chinese weapon. It is now used metaphorically to describe certain Chinese weapons systems. The term has its roots in ancient Chinese folklore, which recounts how a hero wielding such a weapon managed to overcome a far more powerful adversary. The eponymous assassin's mace was a club which was used to break an enemy's blade in combat, or a hand mace that could impact through an enemy's armor. According to American military analysts, the term is now used in China to describe a specific type of military system that demonstrates asymmetrical warfare (Note: that is, where a usually weaker combatant uses unconventional military tactics to defeat a generally superior foe.) and anti-access/area denial (Note: that is, denying enemy's forces access to a certain operating environment.) capabilities to counter the United States. Whether assassin's mace refers to a government-defined class of weapons or is merely used in the Chinese government to describe these weapons is disputed.

== Etymology ==
The term shashoujian is composed of three characters that can be literally translated as 'kill', 'hand', and 'mace' when read separately. However, the combination of those characters is often interpreted in different ways when translated to English (as Chinese has many two-character words), with the Foreign Broadcast Information Service using over 15 different translations from 1996 to 2005. Typically, shashoujian is rendered in English as 'assassin's mace', where the two character compound shashou is interpreted as 'assassin' and jian is interpreted as 'mace'. However, the term can also be translated as 'killing mace', as the word shoujian refers to a small hand mace used in ancient China to kill heavily armoured enemies. The definite origin of the combined term shashoujian is elusive, but has its roots in Chinese folklore where the term is typically used to describe a secret weapon of surprising power used to overcome a more powerful adversary.

== Modern usage ==
While the term as a figure of speech has been around for centuries and has been revived in contemporary Chinese pop culture, one of the main disputes is on its usage in a modern military context. The term is frequently used in Chinese military contexts to describe new weapons systems, and military analysts Bruzdzinski and Michael Pillsbury interpret this as technical terminology used by China to denote a new class of weapons that are designed to counter a superior adversary. In contrast, Alastair Johnston disputes this deeper meaning, describing it as being a popular expression roughly equivalent to the English idioms "silver bullet" or "trump card", and means anything which ensures success. The Economist also states its meaning as "trump card" or "ace up one's sleeve."

== Application to military systems ==
Proponents of the term assassin's mace to describe Chinese military development say that the Chinese government uses the term to describe a group of technologies or strategies that are specifically designed to counter the United States and displace it as a world power. Rush Doshi suggests that People's Liberation Army strategists developed the concept of these weapons to displace the United States as a world superpower and that fulfilling the concept necessitated the development of the People's Liberation Army Navy Submarine Force, sea mines, and anti-ship ballistic missiles. Doshi and Bruzdzinski also describe assassin's mace as being specifically focused on asymmetrical warfare and anti-access/area denial tactics.

=== Grand strategy ===
Doshi argues in his book The Long Game that China seeks to displace the United States as the world's dominant military and economic superpower. He models this as a reaction to what he calls the "traumatic trifecta", of the Tiananmen Square massacre, the Gulf War, and the dissolution of the Soviet Union, which changed China's view of America from a potential cooperator against a Soviet threat to the primary threat to China. In Doshi's view, the American reaction to the Tiananmen square massacre showed that the United States wanted to undermine China's political system, Iraq's lopsided defeat in Gulf War demonstrated that the US could have the military ability to defeat China, and the end of the Soviet Union left China almost alone in the world as a socialist state. Doshi says that this caused China's military to re-orient itself against the United States by developing assassin's mace weaponry that could counter America's conventional superiority.

=== Submarines ===
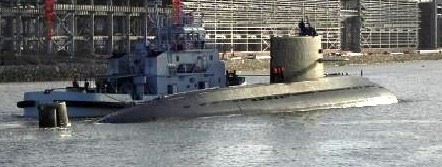
The People's Liberation Army Navy has built 17 diesel-electric Type 039A submarines.

Doshi and Bruzdzinski agree that submarines are a key component of assassin's mace weaponry, but propose different reasons for how they fit into that paradigm. Doshi describes assassin's mace submarines as those that can attack American carrier battle groups using anti-ship missiles and sea mines, while being weak in land-attack capabilities. In Doshi's view, the assassin's mace concept requires China's navy to use a mix of diesel electric and nuclear submarines in contrast to the American policy of only using nuclear submarines. Doshi proposes that China chose to incorporate diesel-electric submarines into their fleet as an asymmetrical weapon because they are cheaper and quieter than the nuclear submarines used by the United States. While diesel-electric submarines do not have the range of a nuclear submarine, this would be an acceptable trade-off in a conflict close to Chinese territory where the submarines are used to deny American access to the Asia-Pacific region.

To contrast, Jason Bruzdzinski describes nuclear ballistic missile submarines as being "the shashoujian of the Chinese navy". Bruzdzinski's view is that such a submarine would be stealthy and have a large range, meaning that it would be resistant against pre-emptive strikes and serve as a nuclear deterrent. Bruzdzinski cites Chinese analysts Liu Xiaodu and Kang Fashun as supporting the view that the threat of nuclear weapons are able to deter a technologically superior force such as the United States from entering into a conflict with China.

=== Sea mines ===
Andrew S. Erickson considers sea mines as being a core part of assassin's mace as they are able to cost-effectively deny access to an area. According to Erickson, Chinese military strategists describe sea mines as "easy to lay and difficult to sweep" and label sea mines as assassin's mace weaponry, having invested significant resources into developing them. Chinese military analysts have also said that attacks utilizing sea mines against the USS Tripoli and USS Princeton during the Gulf War demonstrated significant vulnerability of American ships to this type of weaponry.

=== Missiles ===
The DF-17 is designed to launch a hypersonic glide vehicle, a kind of missile that takes an unpredictable path to hit its target and would be more difficult for the United States to intercept.

Anti-ship ballistic missiles (ASBMs) are considered to be another major assassin's mace weapon. The Science of Second Artillery Campaigns, a textbook published by People's Liberation Army Rocket Force, says that ASBMs should be used as assassin's mace weapons to keep away enemy aircraft carriers. Chinese analyst Dong Lu describes aircraft carriers as a tool of the rich and powerful states that want to be aggressive. Due to what Dong describes as asymmetry in defensive versus offensive technologies, ASBMs can be an effective way for poor states to defeat or prevent military intervention from an aircraft carrier.

== See also ==
- Asymmetric warfare
- Unrestricted Warfare
