= Club (weapon) =

Blunt weapon

An assortment of club weapons from the Wujing Zongyao from left to right: flail, metal bat, double flail, truncheon, mace, barbed mace

A club (also known as a cudgel, baton, bludgeon, truncheon, cosh, nightstick, or impact weapon) is a short staff or stick, usually made of wood, wielded as a weapon or tool since prehistory. There are several examples of blunt-force trauma caused by clubs in the past, including at the site of Nataruk in Turkana, Kenya, described as the scene of a prehistoric conflict between bands of hunter-gatherers 10,000 years ago.

Most clubs are small enough to be swung with one hand, although larger clubs may require the use of two to be effective. Various specialized clubs are used in martial arts and other fields, including the law-enforcement baton. The military mace is a more sophisticated descendant of the club, typically made of metal and featuring a spiked, knobbed, or flanged head attached to a shaft.

Examples of cultural depictions of clubs may be found in mythology, where they are associated with strong figures such as Hercules or the Japanese oni, or in popular culture, where they are associated with primitive cultures, especially cavemen. Ceremonial maces may also be displayed as a symbol of governmental authority.

Clubs are not uncommon in European heraldry, in which they often represent strength and authority.

Clubs feature prominently in Spanish-suited playing cards and their derivatives.

The wounds inflicted by a club are generally known as strike trauma or blunt-force trauma injuries.

== Law enforcement ==
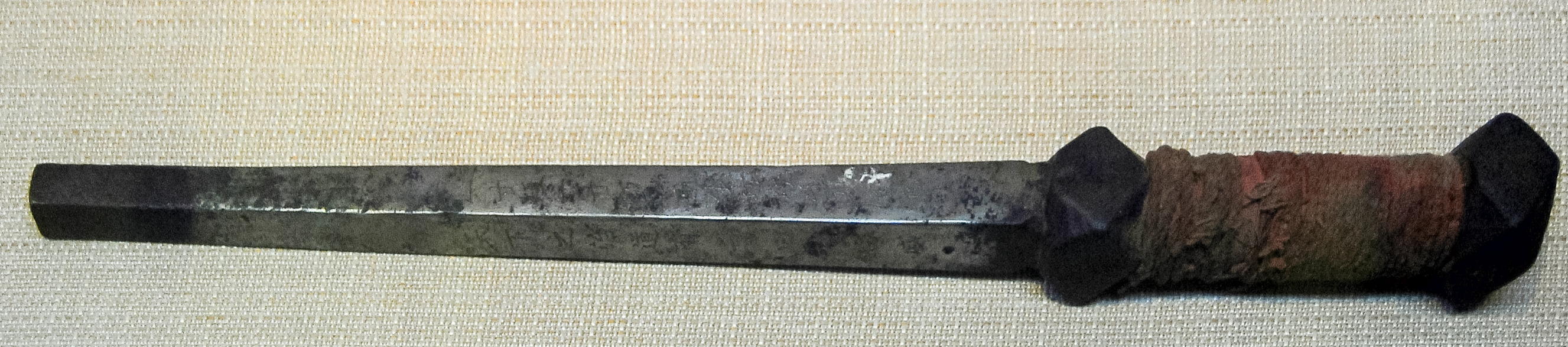
Truncheon, Yuan dynasty

Police forces and their predecessors have traditionally favored the use, whenever possible, of less lethal weapons than guns or blades. Until recent times, when alternatives such as tasers and capsicum spray became available, this category of policing weapon has generally been filled by some form of wooden club variously termed a truncheon, baton, nightstick, or lathi. Short, flexible clubs are also often used, especially by plainclothes officers who need to avoid notice. These are known colloquially as blackjacks, saps, or coshes.

Conversely, criminals have been known to arm themselves with an array of homemade or improvised clubs, generally of easily concealable sizes, or which can be explained as being carried for legitimate purposes (such as baseball bats).

In addition, Shaolin monks and members of other religious orders around the world have employed cudgels from time to time as defensive weapons.

== Types ==
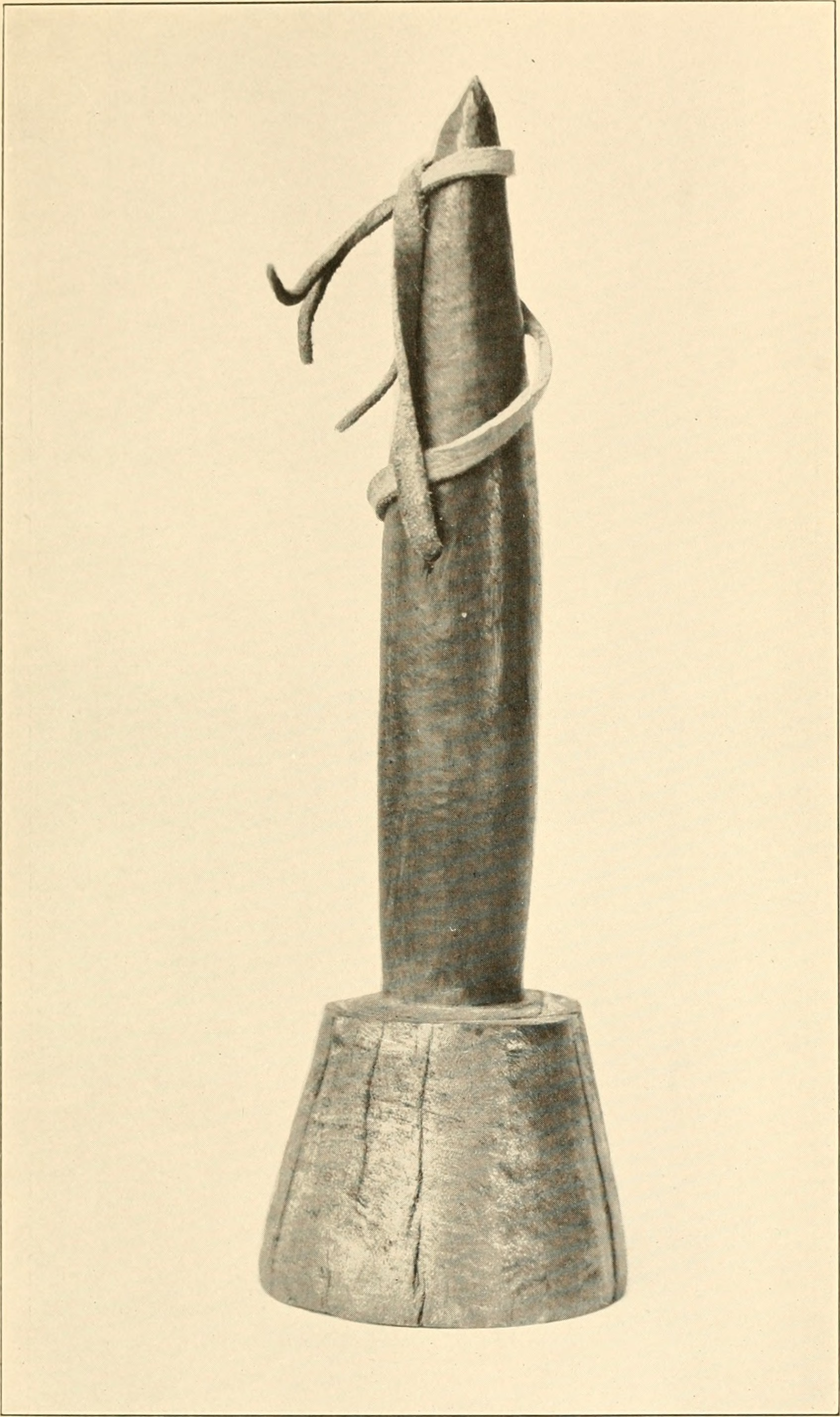
A Yuma war club

Though perhaps the simplest of all weapons, clubs come in many varieties, including:

- Aklys – a club with an integrated leather thong, used to return it to the hand after snapping it at an opponent. Used by the legions of the Roman Empire.
- Ball club – These clubs were used by Native Americans. There are two types; the stone ball clubs that were used mostly by early Plains, Plateau and Southwest Native Indians and the wooden ball clubs that the Huron and Iroquois tribes used. These consisted of a relatively free-moving head of rounded stone or wood attached to a wooden handle.
- Bang – Chinese military weapon type used in medieval times. Also used in modern Wushu showcase and martial-arts practice.
- Baseball, cricket and T-ball bats – The baseball bat is often used as an improvised weapon, much like the pickaxe handle. In countries where baseball is not commonly played, baseball bats are often first thought of as weapons. Tee ball bats are also used in this manner. Their smaller size and lighter weight make the bats easier to handle in one hand than a baseball bat. Cricket bats are heavier and their flat shape and short handle make them unwieldy as weapons, but they are more commonly available than baseball bats in some countries.
- Baton or truncheon – forms used by law enforcement.
- Blackjack or cosh – a weighted club designed to stun the subject.
- Bian – a tubular club used by medieval Chinese infantry and generals.
- Borduna – a cylindrical wooden club used by Amazonian peoples
- Clava (full name clava mere okewa) – a traditional stone hand-club used by Mapuche Indians in Chile, featuring a long flat body. In Spanish, it is known as clava cefalomorfa. It has some ritual importance as a special sign of distinction carried by the tribal chief.
- Cudgel – A stout stick carried by peasants during the Middle Ages. It functioned as a walking staff and a weapon for both self-defence and wartime. Clubmen revolted in several localities against the excesses of soldiers on both sides during the English Civil War. During the 18th century singlestick fighting (a training sport for the use of the single handed backsword) was called singlesticking, or cudgel-play.
- Cue stick – is an item of sportingequipment essential to the games of pool, snooker and carom billiards. It is used to strike a ball, usually the cue ball.
- Gada – a mallet or blunt mace from the Indian subcontinent.
- Gata – a Fijian war club.
- Ghioagă – a Romanian club similar to a shillelagh; also called Bâtă (the name comes from Latin batt(u)ere – battery). This was used as a weapon in group fights against Ottoman Empire by irregular troops made up of peasants, vassals to local Princes in Wallachia and Moldavia. Early mentions of it occur from the 15th century in some historical sources.
- Gunstock war club – a war club stylized as the butt of a rifle
- Jiǎn – a type of quad-edged straight club specifically designed to break other weapons with sharp edges.
- Jutte or jitte – a distinctive weapon of the samurai police, consisting of an iron rod with a hook. It could parry and disarm a sword-wielding assailant without serious injury. Eventually, the jutte also came to be considered a symbol of official status.
- Kanabō (nyoibo, konsaibo, tetsubō, ararebo) – Various types of different-sized Japanese clubs made of wood and or iron, usually with iron spikes or studs. First used by the samurai.
- Kanak war clubs – traditional maces used by the Kanak people of New Caledonia
- Kiyoga – a spring baton similar in concept to the Asp collapsible police baton, but with the center section made of a heavy-duty steel spring. The tip and first section slide into the spring, and the whole nests into a seven-inch handle. To deploy the kiyoga, all that is necessary is to grasp the handle and swing. This causes the parts to extend from the handle into a baton seventeen inches long. The kiyoga has one advantage over a conventional collapsible baton: it can reach around a raised arm trying to block it to strike the head.
- Knobkerrie – a war club of southern and eastern Africa with a distinctive knob on the end
- Kubotan – a short, thin, lightweight club often used by law enforcement officers, generally to apply pressure against selected points of the body in order to encourage compliance without inflicting injury.
- Leangle – an Australian Aboriginal fighting-club with a hooked striking head, typically nearly at right angles to the weapon's shaft. The name comes from Kulin languages such as Wemba-Wemba and Woiwurrung, based on the word lia (tooth).
- Life preserver (also hyphenated life-preserver) – a short, often weighted club intended for self-defense. Mentioned in Gilbert and Sullivan's 1879 comic opera The Pirates of Penzance and in several Sherlock Holmes stories.
- Mace – a metal club with a heavy head on the end, designed to deliver very powerful blows. The head of a mace may also have small studs forged into it. The mace is often confused with the spiked morning star or with the articulated flail.
- Mere – short, broad-bladed Māori club, usually made from nephrite jade and used for making forward-striking thrusts
- Morning star – a medieval club-like weapon consisting of a shaft with an attached ball adorned with one or more spikes
- Nulla-nulla – a short, curved hardwood club, used as a hunting weapon and in tribal in-fighting, by the Aboriginal people of Australia
- Nunchaku (also called nunchucks) – an Asian weapon consisting of two clubs, connected by a short rope, thong or chain, and usually used with one club in hand and the other swung as a flail.
- Oslop – a two-handed, very heavy, often iron-shod, Russian club that was used as the cheapest and the most readily available infantry weapon.
- Paddle club – common in the Solomon Islands, these clubs could be used in warfare or for propelling a small dugout canoe.
- Racket – an item of sporting equipment used to strike a ball or shuttlecock in tennis, badminton, squash, table tennis.
- Rungu (Swahili, plural marungu) – a wooden throwing club or baton bearing special symbolism and significance in certain East African tribal cultures. It is especially associated with Maasai morans (male warriors) who have traditionally used it in warfare and for hunting.
- Sali, a Fijian war club
- Sally rod – a long, thin wooden stick, generally made from willow (Latin salix), and used chiefly in the past in Ireland as a disciplinary implement, but also sometimes used like a club (without the fencing-like technique of stick fighting) in fights and brawls. In Japan this type of stick is called the Hanbō meaning half stick, and in FMA (Filipino martial arts) it is called the eskrima or escrima stick, often made from rattan.
- Shillelagh – a wooden club or cudgel, typically made from a stout knotty stick with a large knob on the end, that is associated with Ireland in folklore
- Slapjack – a variation of the blackjack consisting of a longer strap which lets it be used like a flail, and can be used as a club or for trapping techniques as seen in the use of nunchaku and other flexible weapons
- Supi – a war club of the Solomon Islands
- Telescopic baton – a rigid baton capable of collapsing to a shorter length for greater portability and concealability
- Tipstaff – a ceremonial rod used by a court officer of the same name
- Tonfa or side-handle baton – a club of Okinawan origin featuring a second handle mounted perpendicular to the shaft
- Totokia – a Fijian spiked club
- Trench raiding club – a type of melee weapon used by both sides in World War I
- Ula – traditional throwing club from Fiji
- U'u – an exquisitely carved ceremonial club from the Marquesan Islands, used as a chiefly status symbol
- Waddy – a heavy hardwood club, used as a weapon for hunting and in tribal in-fighting, and also as a tool, by the Aboriginal people of Australia. The word waddy describes a club from New South Wales, but Australians also use the word generally to include other Aboriginal clubs, including the nulla nulla and leangle.
- Worraga – An Australian-aboriginal club with boomerang-like aerodynamics. Can be thrown or hand-held.

== Animal appendages ==
Some animals have limbs or appendages resembling clubs, such as:

- Ankylosaurus (armored dinosaur)
- Anodontosaurus (armored dinosaur)
- Club-winged manakin (bird)
- Dyoplosaurus (armored dinosaur)
- Jamaican ibis (extinct bird)
- Mantis shrimp (marine crustacean)
- Nodocephalosaurus (armored dinosaur)
- Rodrigues solitaire (extinct bird)
- Talarurus (armored dinosaur)

== Gallery ==
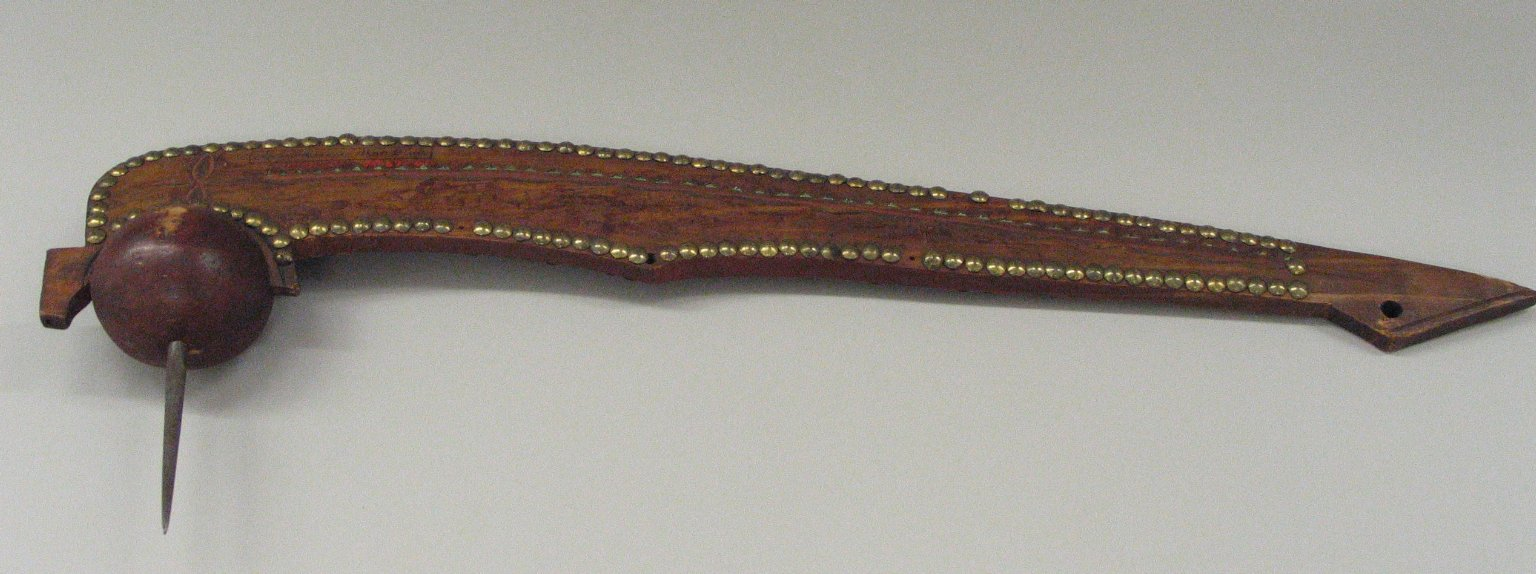
Ball-headed War Club with Spike, Menominee (Native American), early 19th century, Brooklyn Museum

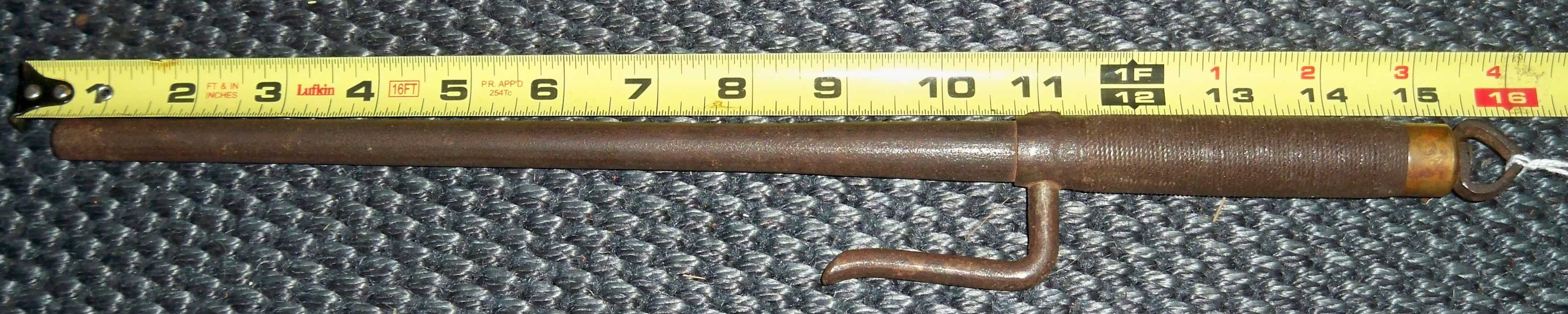
An iron jutte from Japan.

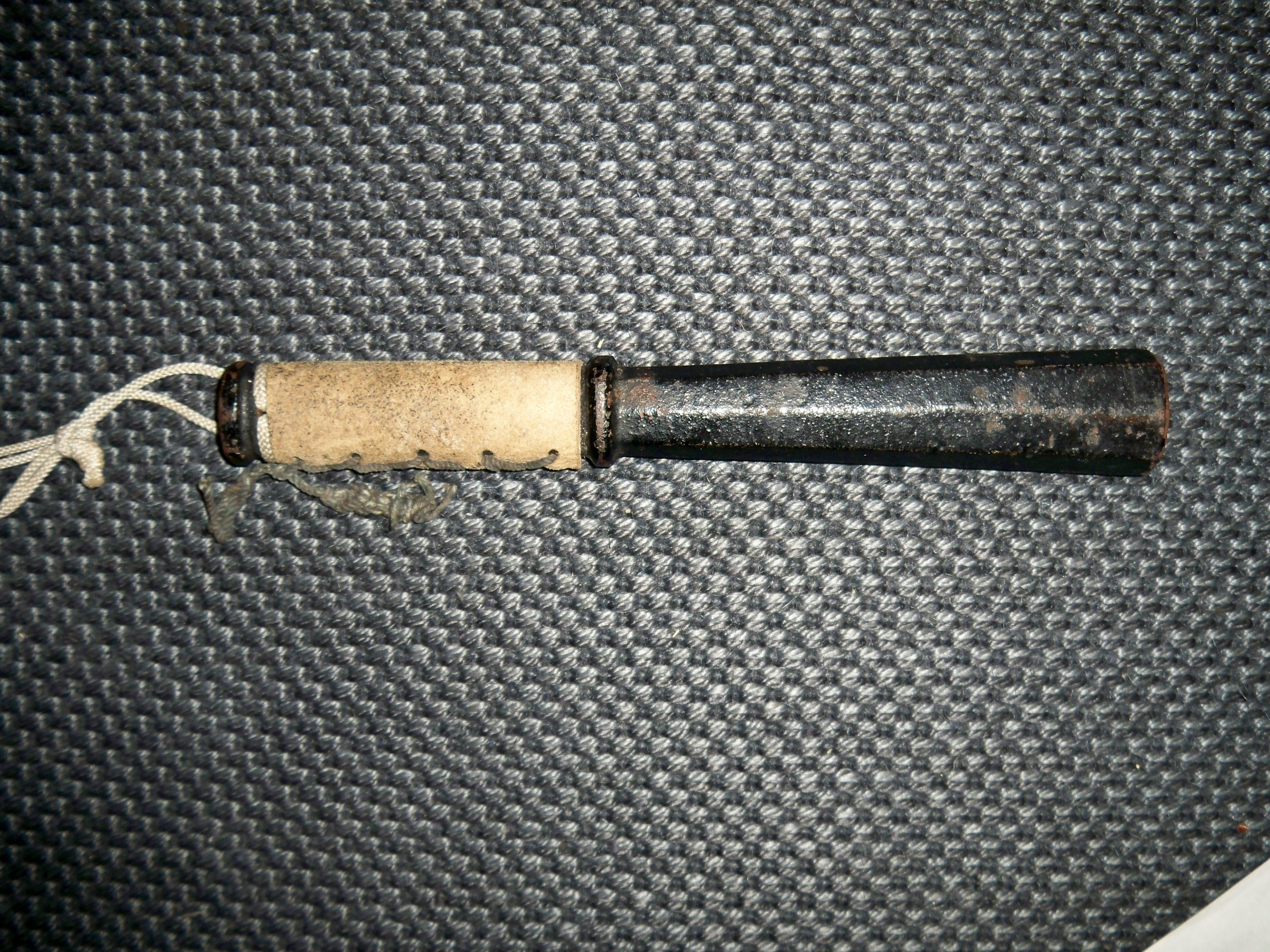
Small Japanese Tetsubo, an iron club with a leather grip.

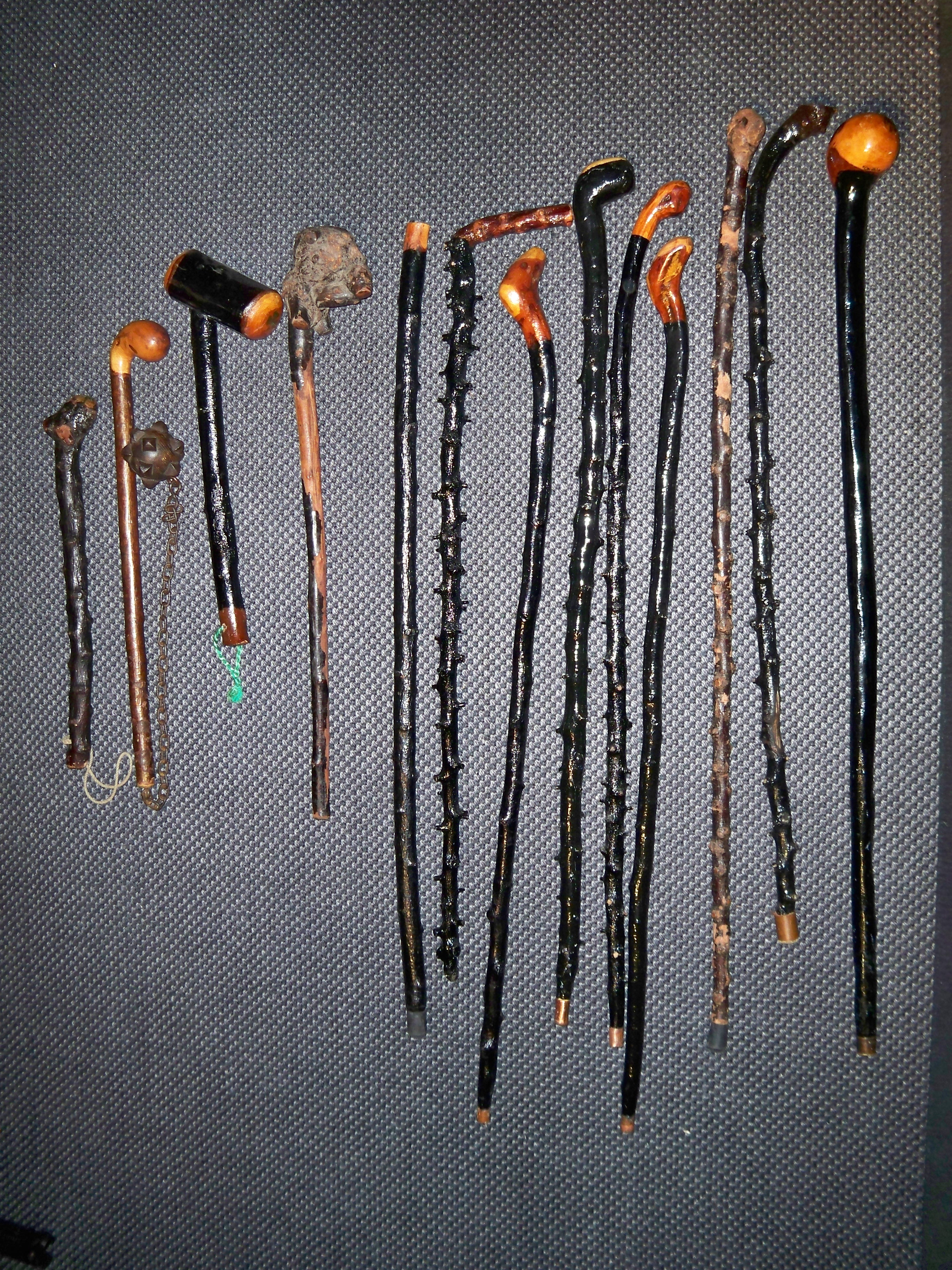
Various assorted shillelagh (club).

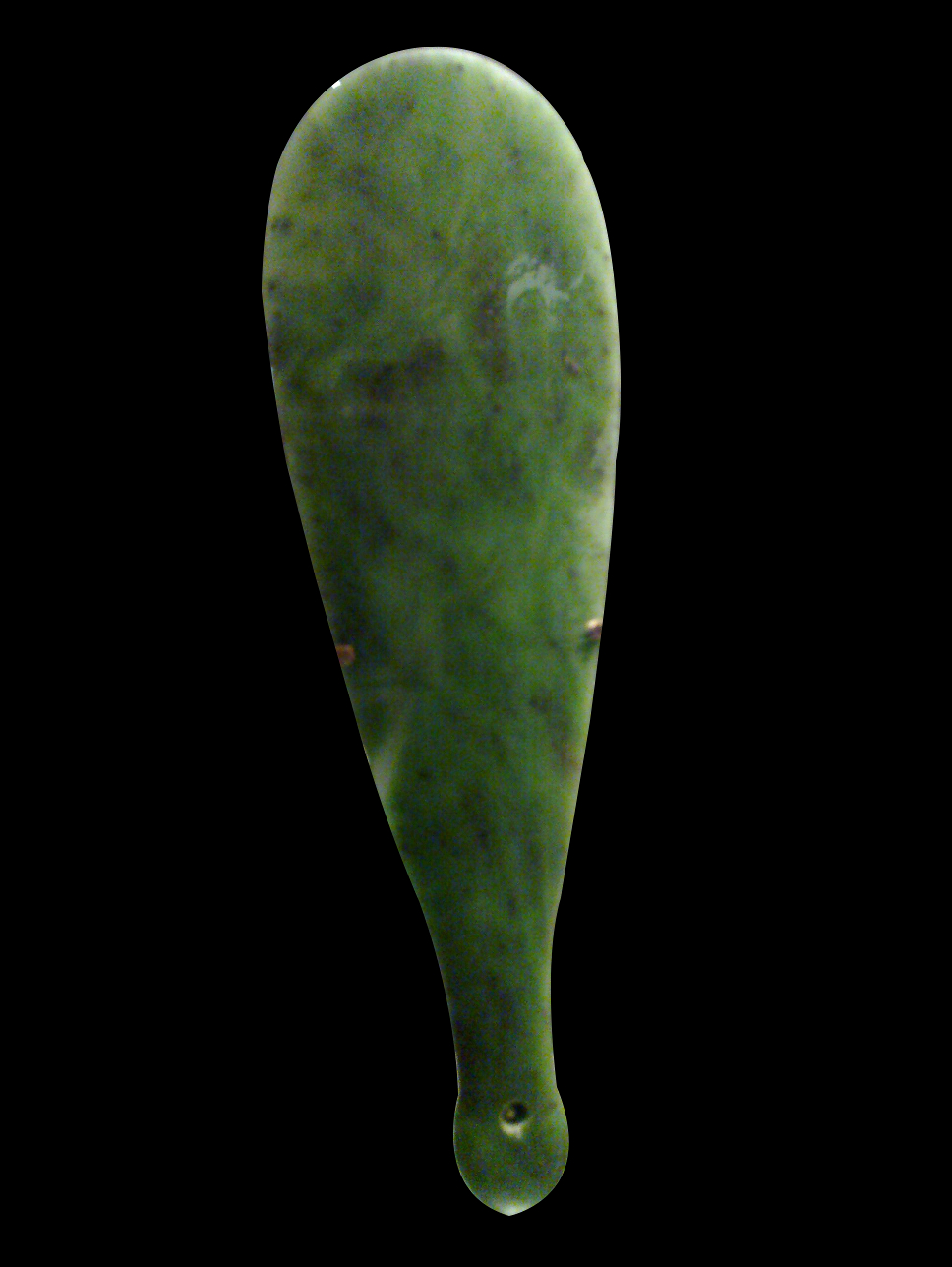
Traditional Māori mere, made from pounamu (nephrite jade).

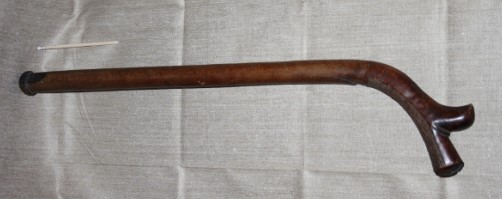
Gata waka

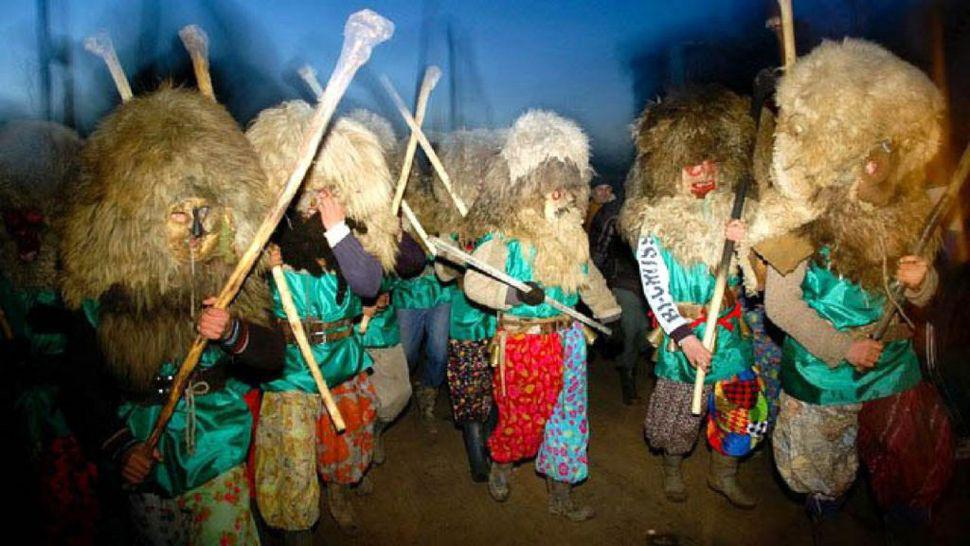
Ghioagă (Romanian Quarterstaff)

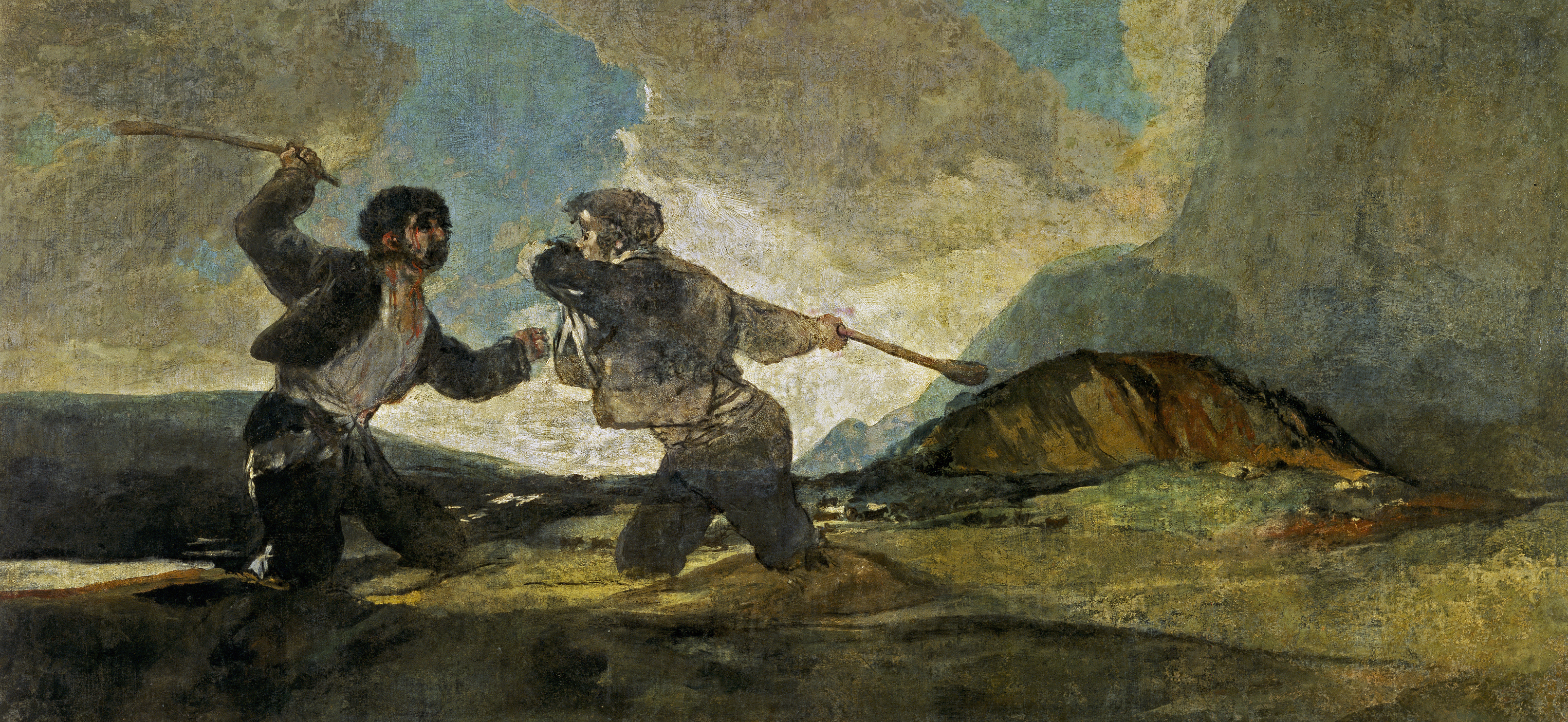
Fight with Cudgels, by Francisco Goya

A club pictured in the coat of arms of Nuijamaa

Coat of arms of the North German Confederation

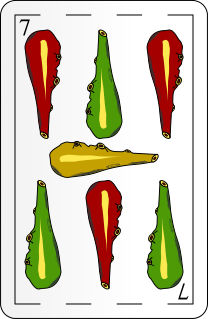
Seven of clubs, Castilian pattern

== See also ==
- Cudgel War
