= U'u =

War club of the Marquesas Islands

The U'u is a war club of the Marquesas Islands.

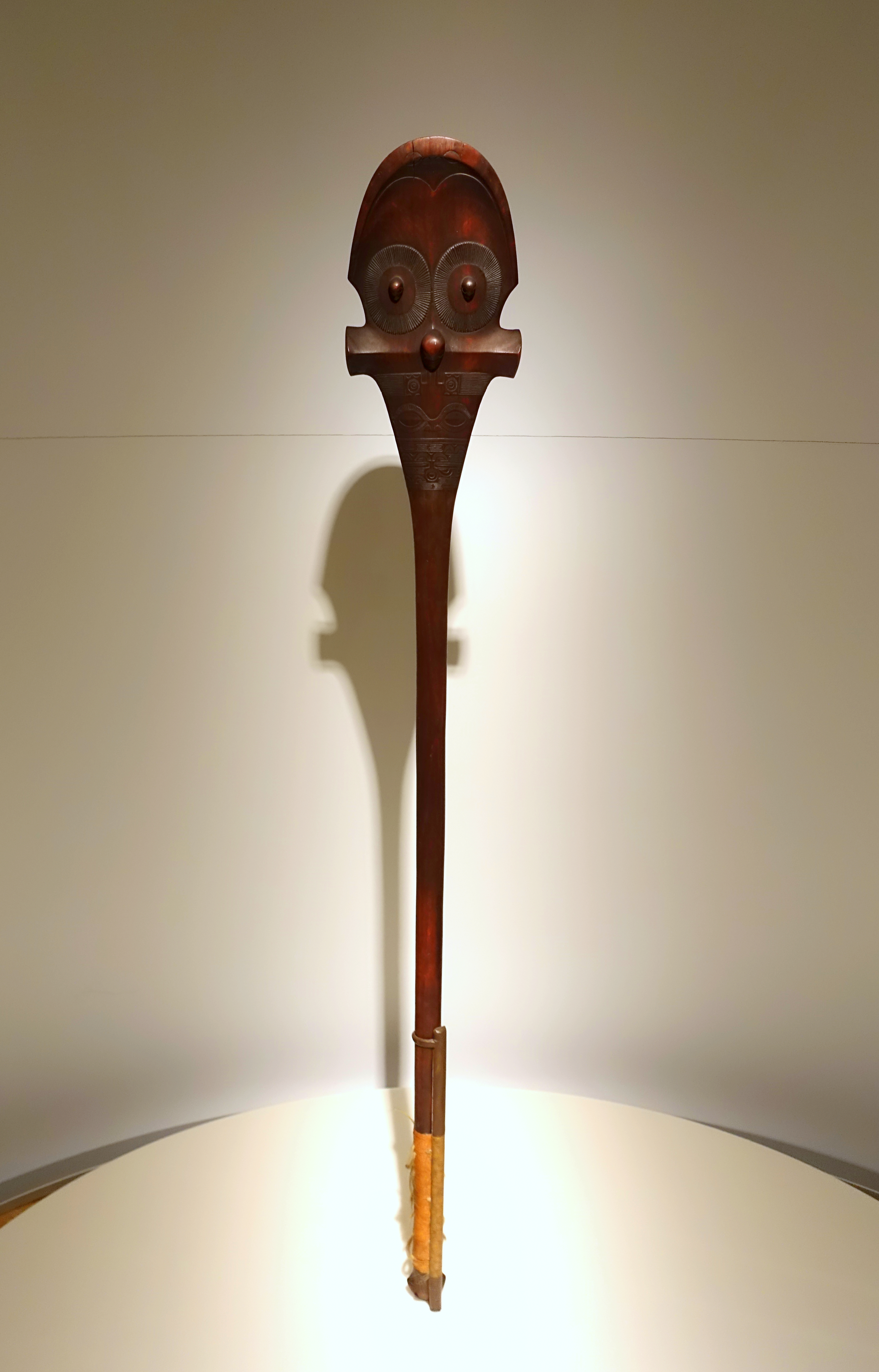
U'u of the Marquesas.

Cut from iron wood, its shape and large size distinguish it from other Pacific gunstocks. It was reserved for a caste of warriors who were assisting allied tribes. The club should at least reach its possessor's armpits. The striking head, although apparently identical, was richly carved, and it is an artistic work with drawings representing lizards, human figures, or tattoo patterns. U'us were left in a taro field, where they turned black, and then were coated with coconut oil.

== Gallery ==
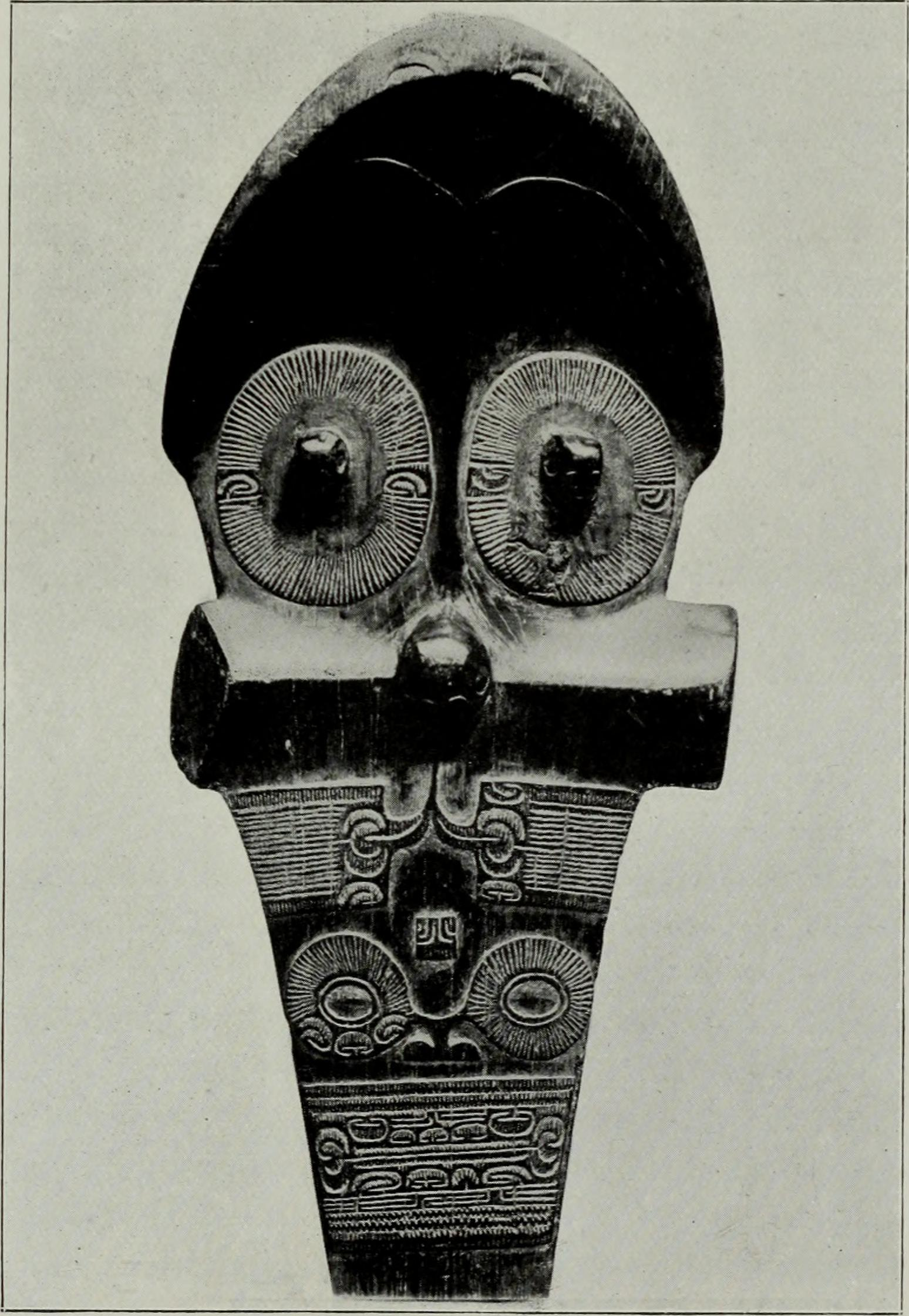
U'u's striking head.

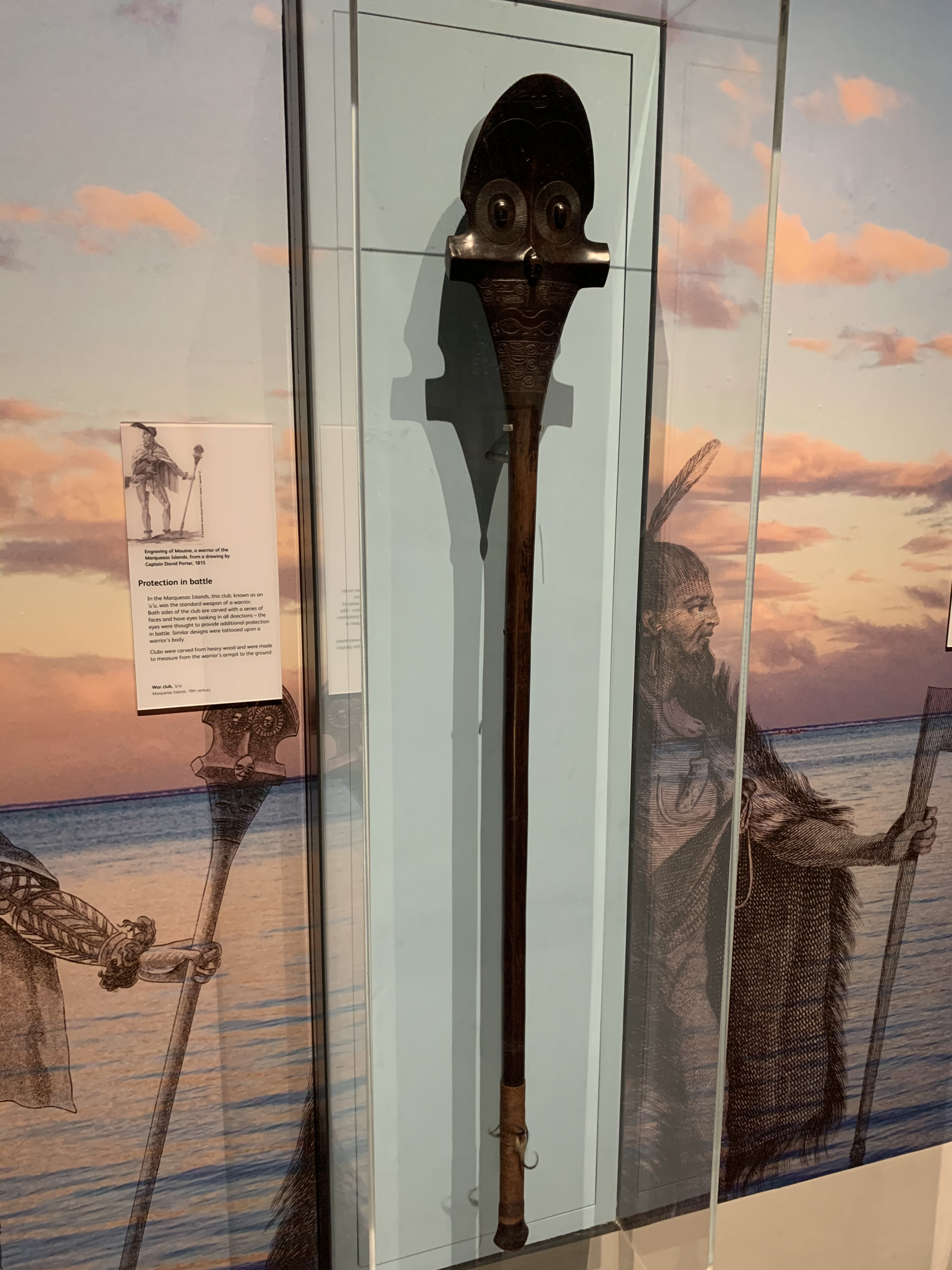
U'u war club, National Museum of Scotland, Edinburgh.

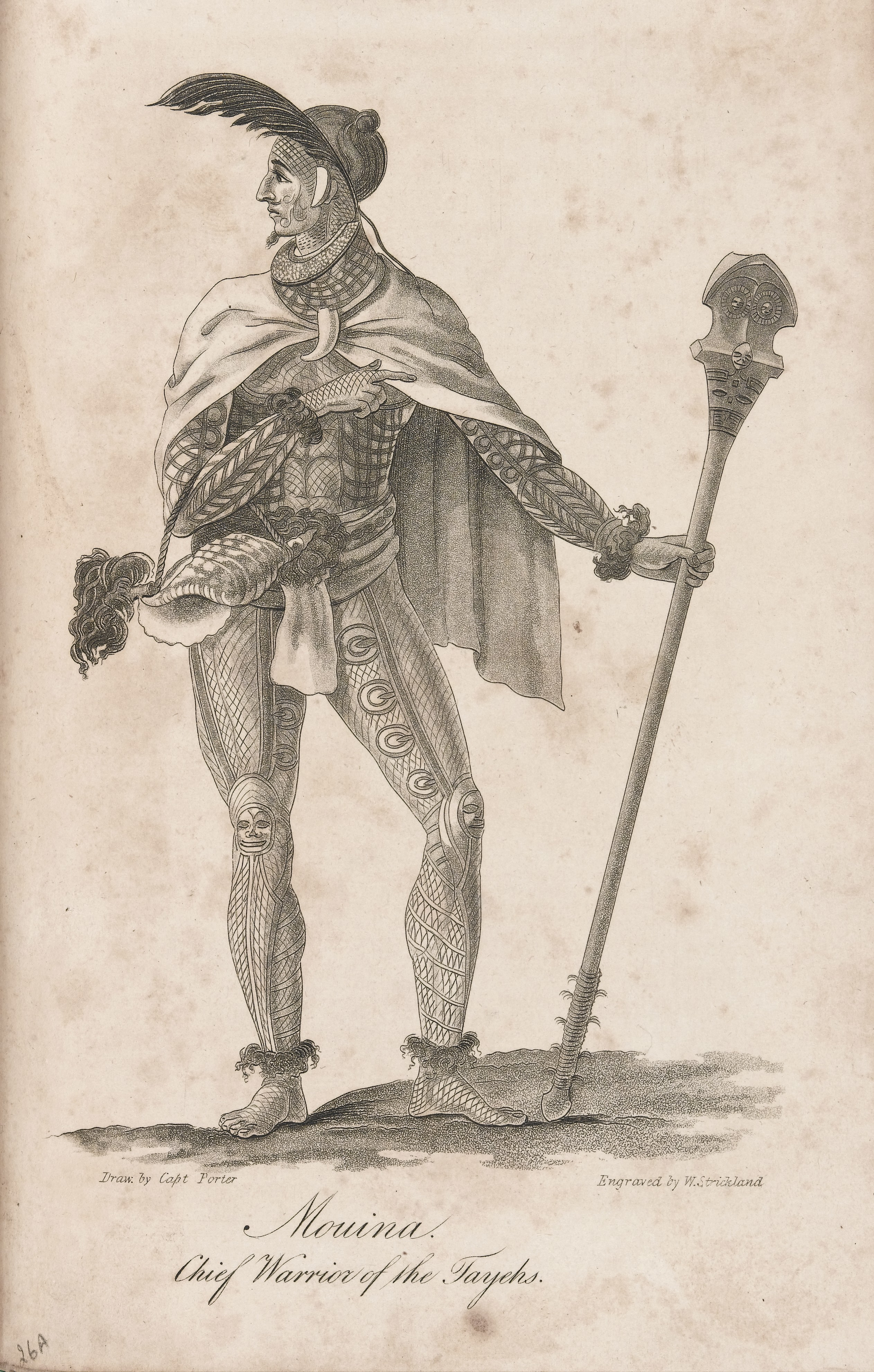
Tribe chief with a U'u.

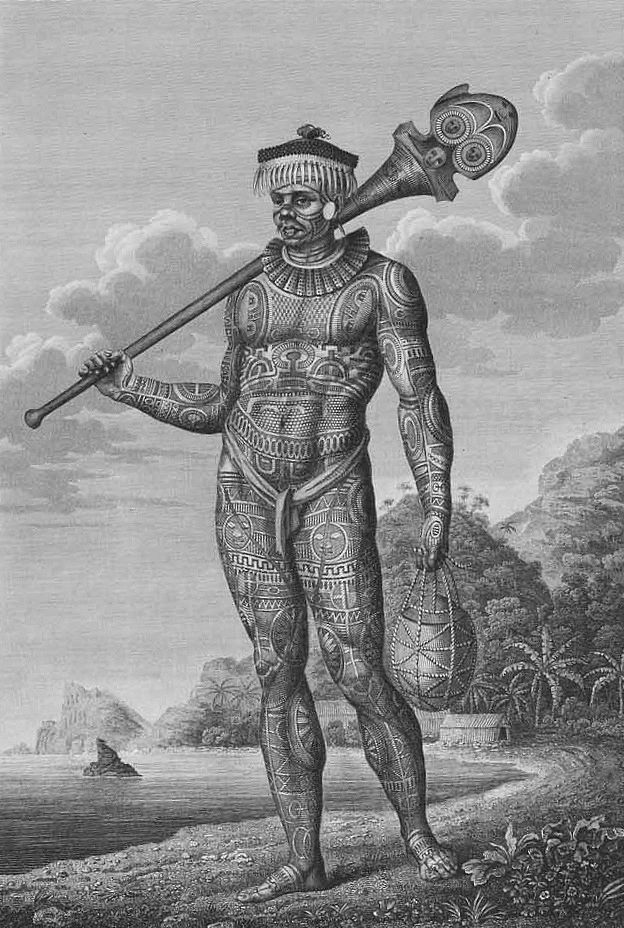
Nuku Hiva warrior with tattoo and his U'u.

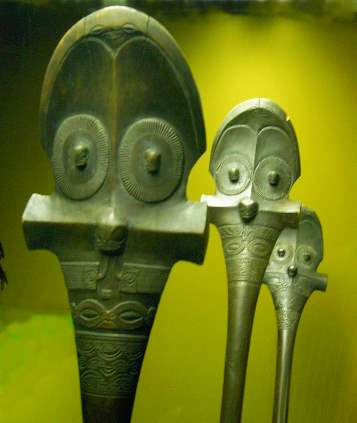
U'u

== Bibliography ==
- John Charles Edler, Terence Barrow, Art of Polynesia, Hemmeter Publishing Corporation, 1990.
- Anthony JP Meyer, Art océanien, Könemann, 1995.
