= Culacula =

Fijian war club

A culacula is a paddle war club from Fiji.

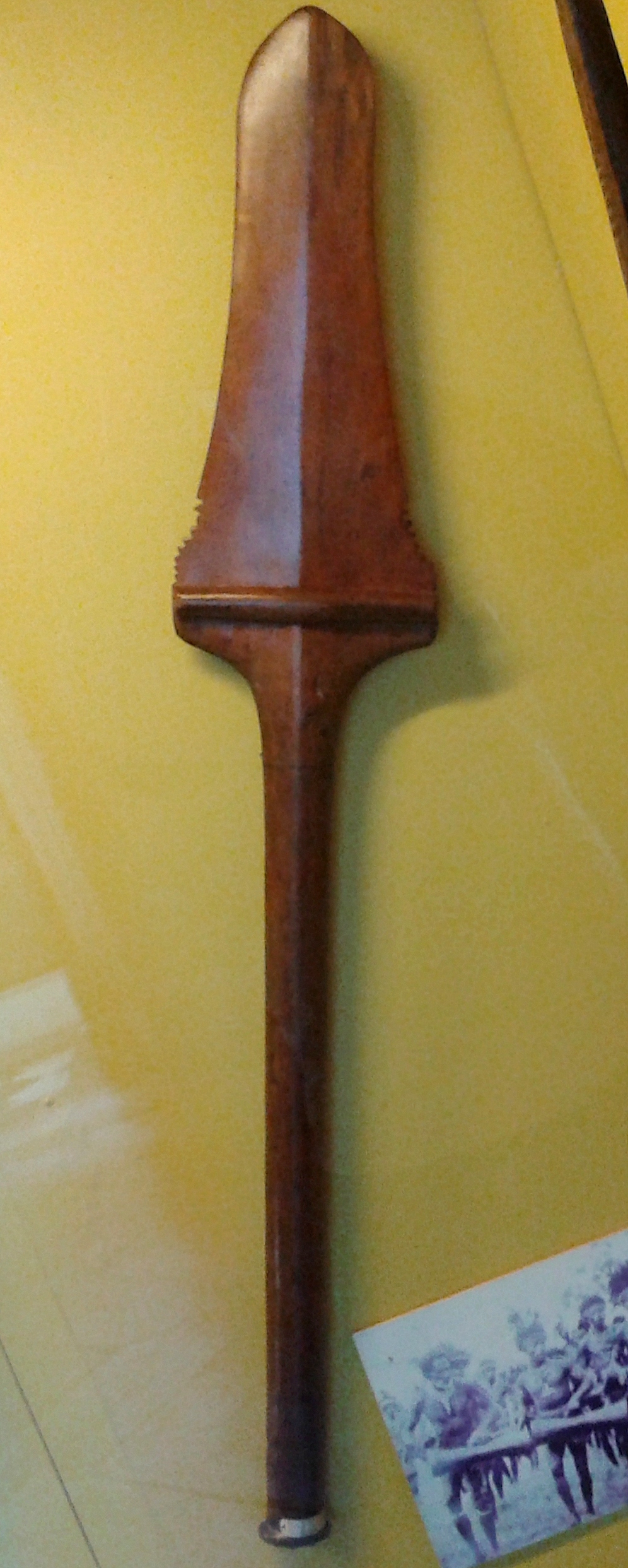
Culacula in the Museu Nacional da Universidade Federal do Rio de Janeiro

== Uses in Fiji ==
Usually cut from a hardwood type of iron wood, it has a broad blade and was used by chiefs or priests to deflect arrows during war.

== See also ==
- Bulibuli
- Gata
- Sali
- Totokia
- Ula

== Bibliography ==
- Fergus Clunie, Fijian Weapons & Warfare, 2003.
- Jean-Edouard Carlier, Archipels Fidji - Tonga - Samoa: La Polynésie Occidentale, Voyageurs & curieux, 2005.
- Rod Ewins, Fijian Artefacts: The Tasmanian Museum and Art Gallery Collection, Tasmanian Museum and Art Gallery, 1982.
