= Bulibuli =

Fijian war club

A bulibuli or vunikau bulibuli is a Fijian war club.

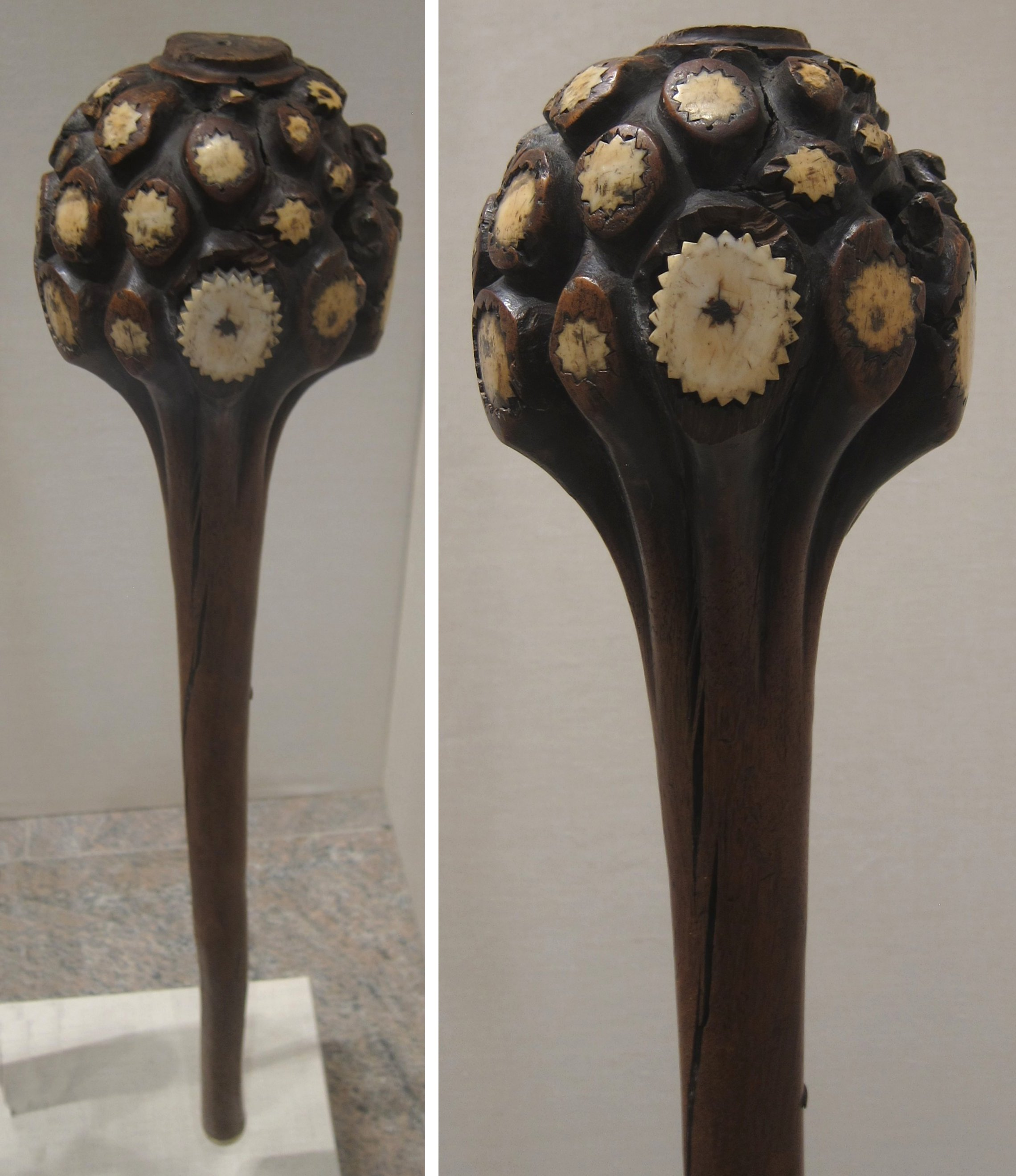
Bulibuli, 19th century, Metropolitan Museum of Art

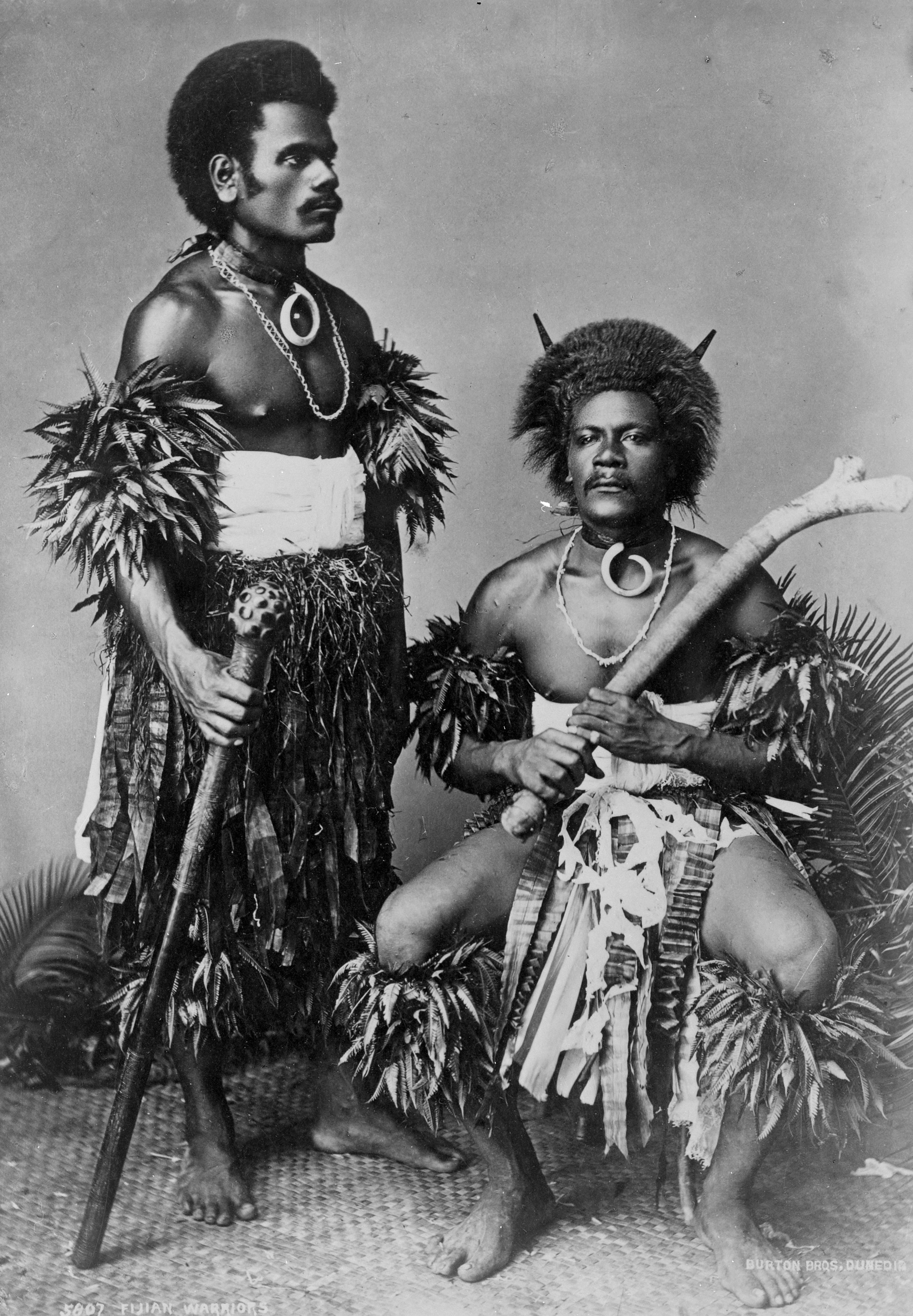
Fijian warriors, the one on the left with a bulibuli

== Uses ==
The bulibuli has a straight and fair long handle (difference with a Ula Bulibuli) and a rounded percussion head. At its end the striking head is rounded and provided with round protuberances, similar to buttons, intended to strengthen the percussion effect. The bulibuli can be decorated with inlays (shells, etc.).

== See also ==
- Culacula
- Gata
- Sali
- Totokia
- Ula

== Bibliography ==
- Fergus Clunie, Fijian weapons and warfare. Fiji Museum 2003, ISBN 978-982-208-006-3.
- John Charles Edler, Terence Barrow, Art of Polynesia, Hemmeter Publishing Corporation, 1990.
- Jean-Edouard Carlier, Archipels Fidji - Tonga - Samoa: La Polynésie Occidentale, Voyageurs & curieux, 2005.
- Rod Ewins, Fijian Artefacts: The Tasmanian Museum and Art Gallery Collection, Tasmanian Museum and Art Gallery, 1982.

== Bibliography ==
- John Charles Edler, Terence Barrow, Art of Polynesia, Hemmeter Publishing Corporation, 1990.
- Rod Ewins, Fijian Artefacts: The Tasmanian Museum and Art Gallery Collection, Tasmanian Museum and Art Gallery, 1982.
- Bulletin of the Fiji Museum, Numeros 1–2, Fiji Museum, 1973.
- Fergus Clunie,Fijian weapons and warfare. Fiji Museum 2003, ISBN 978-982-208-006-3.
