= Supi (weapon) =

The supi is a war club of the Solomon Islands.

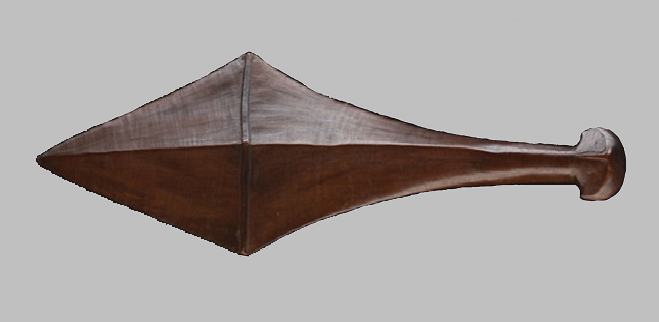
Supi from Malaita

== Uses ==
Cut from iron wood, its diamond shaped head is specific to the Solomon Islands. About thirty centimetres long, it has a carved striking head with well-marked ribs. It is native to Malaita island. Besides its common name of supi, it can sometimes be referred to as a supe or subi. Some were carved from whale bones. The handle was sheathed with coconut fibre braiding, sometimes engraved or inlaid with shells. Some, carved with a crocodile face at their end, were reserved for the tribes chiefs.

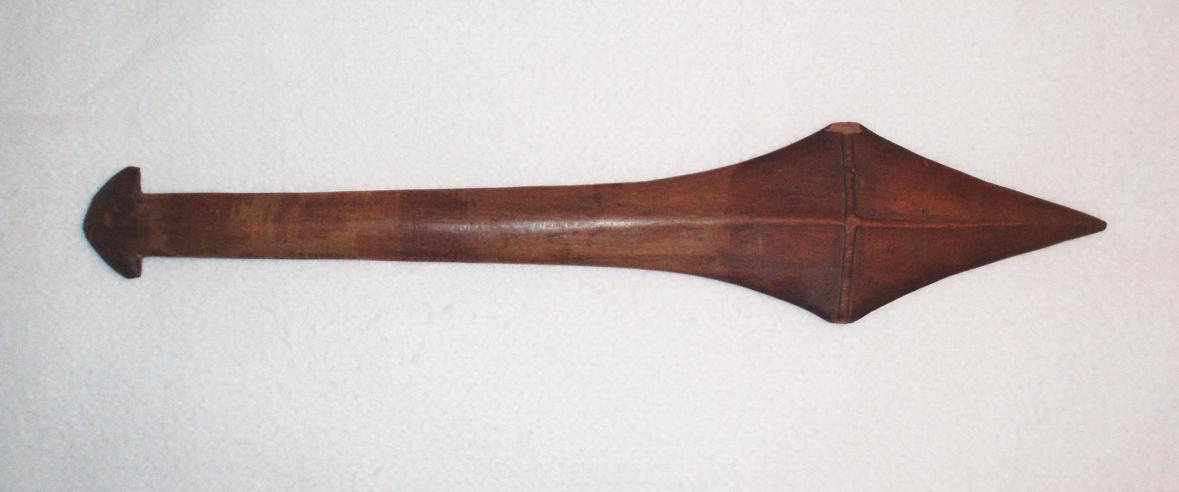
Supi from Malaita

== Bibliography ==
- Anthony JP Meyer, Oceanic Art, Könemann, 1995.
