= Totokia =

Type of club used in the Fiji islands

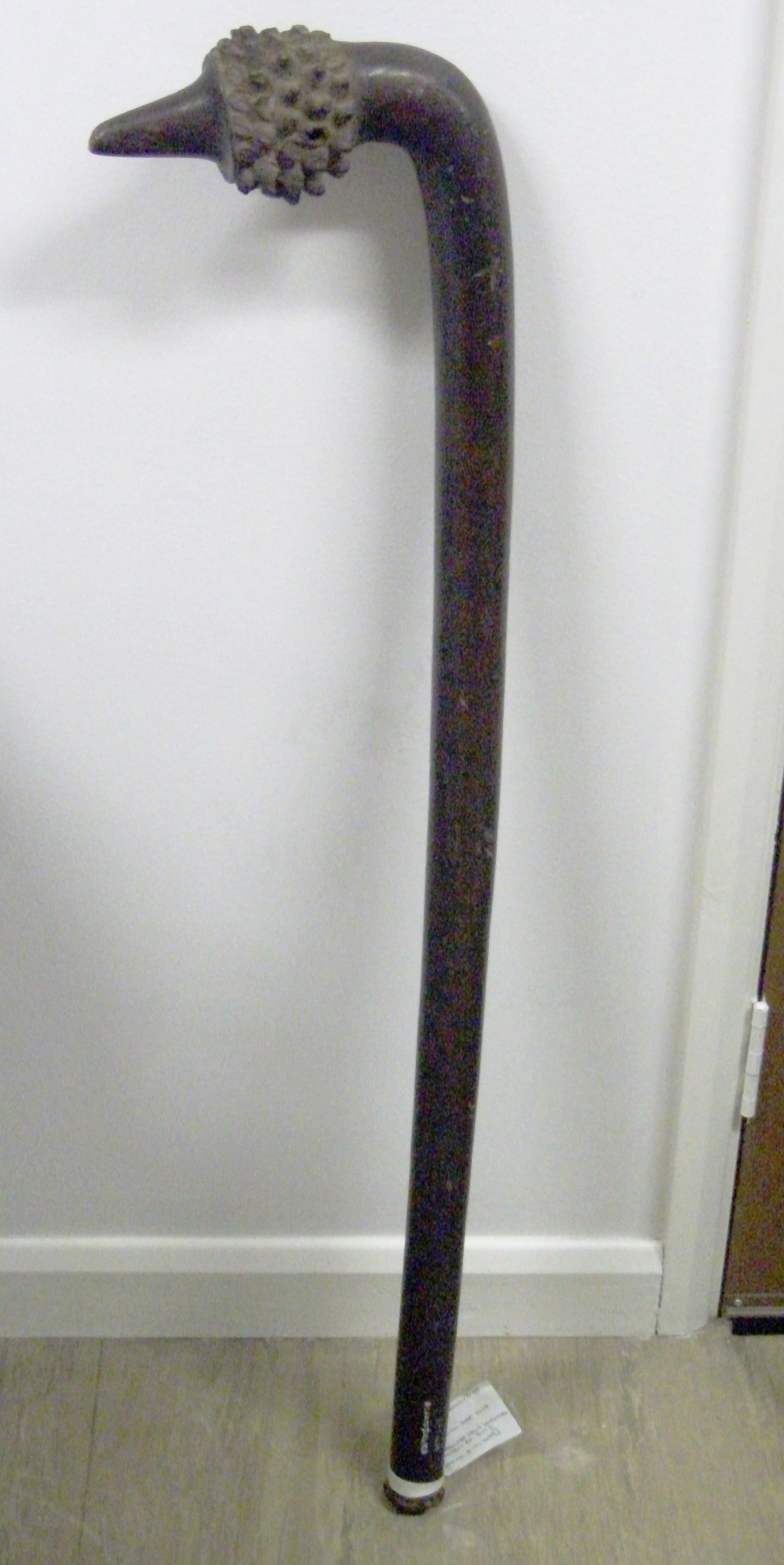
Totokia from the collection at the Bedford Museum

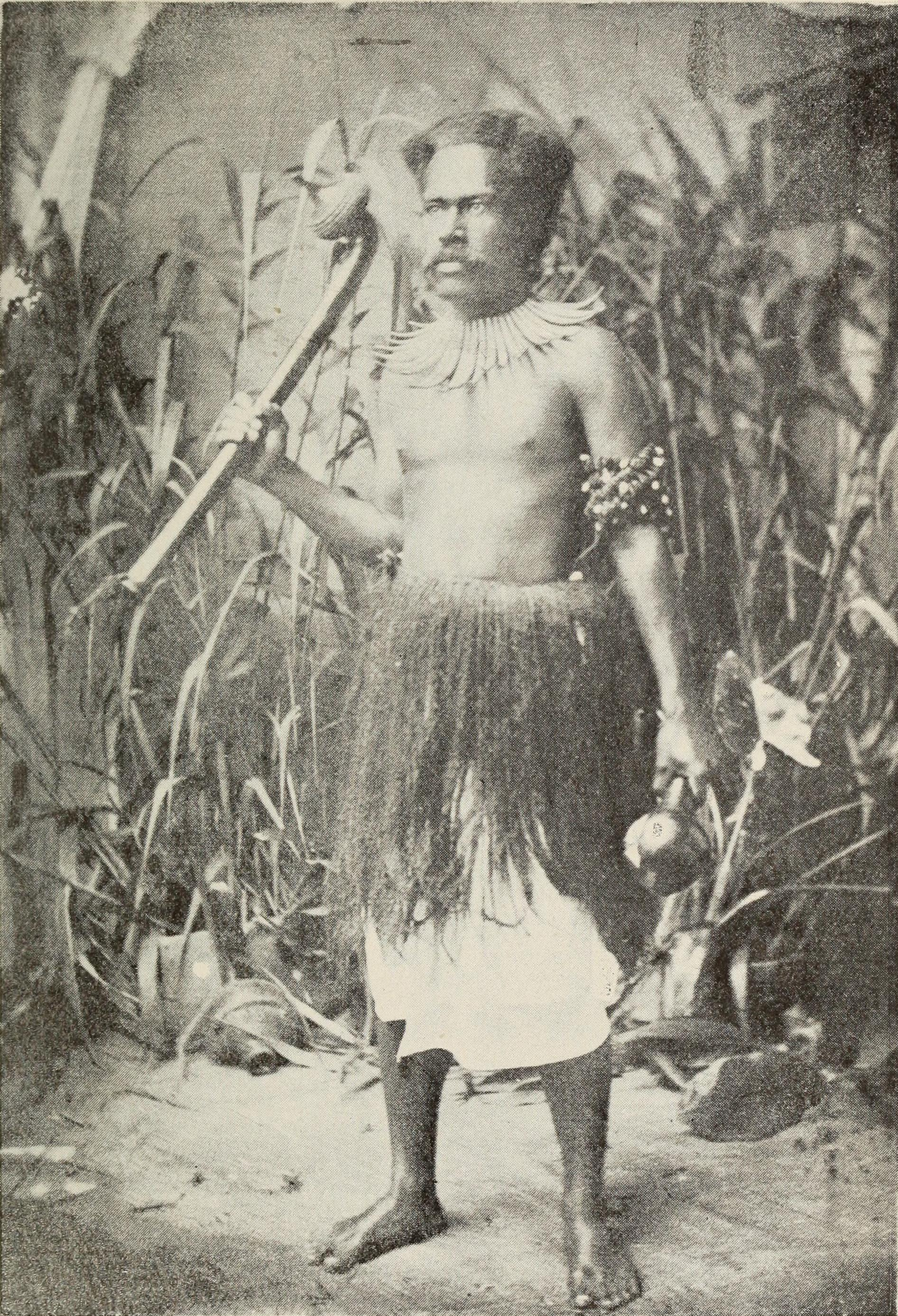
Fijian warrior holding a totokia

The totokia (also pineapple club or beaked battle hammer) is a type of club or battlehammer from Fiji.

The totokia was called the "pineapple club" because of the spiked ball behind the weapon's beak. The name is a misnomer; the shape actually is modeled after that of the fruit of the pandanus.

The spike ("beak") and head of the weapon were used to puncture the skull of the enemy and crush the head. In addition to its functional use as a weapon of war, totokia were also status symbols.

Totokia are held in the collections of several museums, including the Museum of New Zealand Te Papa Tongarewa, the Auckland Museum, the Metropolitan Museum of Art in New York City, the Museum of Fine Arts, Boston, the Peabody Essex Museum of Salem, Massachusetts, the Museum of Archaeology and Anthropology of the University of Cambridge, the Menil Collection in Houston, Texas, and the Israel Museum in Jerusalem.

African and oceanic art expert Bruno Claessens writes that the weapons carried by the Tusken Raiders of Tatooine in George Lucas' Star Wars were inspired by the totokia.

== See also ==
- Bulibuli
- Culacula
- Gata
- Sali
- Ula
