= Alastair Iain Johnston =

American political scientist

- Citizenship: American
- Education: University of Toronto (BA), Harvard University (MA), University of Michigan (PhD)
- Occupation: Political scientist
- Employer: Harvard University

Alastair Iain Johnston (born 1958) is an American political scientist. He is the Gov. James Albert Noe and Linda Noe Laine Professor of China in World Affairs in the Government Department of Harvard University. His work focuses on contemporary Chinese foreign policy and international relations.

== Education ==
Johnston holds a BA in International Relations and History from the University of Toronto (1981), an MA in East Asian Studies from Harvard University (1985), and a PhD in Political Science from the University of Michigan (1993), where his advisors were Robert Axelrod, Albert Feuerwerker, Kenneth Lieberthal, and Michel Oksenberg.

== Books ==
- Cultural Realism: Strategic Culture and Grand Strategy in Chinese History (Princeton 1995)
- Social States: China in International Institutions, 1980-2000 (Princeton University Press, 2008)
- Engaging China: The Management of an Emerging Power (Routledge 1999), edited with Robert S. Ross
- New Directions in the Study of China’s Foreign Policy (Stanford 2006), edited with Robert S. Ross
- Crafting Cooperation: Regional Institutions in Comparative Perspective (Cambridge 2007), edited with Amitav Acharya
- Perception and Misperception in American and Chinese Views of the Other (Carnegie Endowment for International Peace 2015), edited with Shen Mingming
