= Sali (weapon) =

Weapon

A sali or cali or tebetebe is a war club from Fiji.

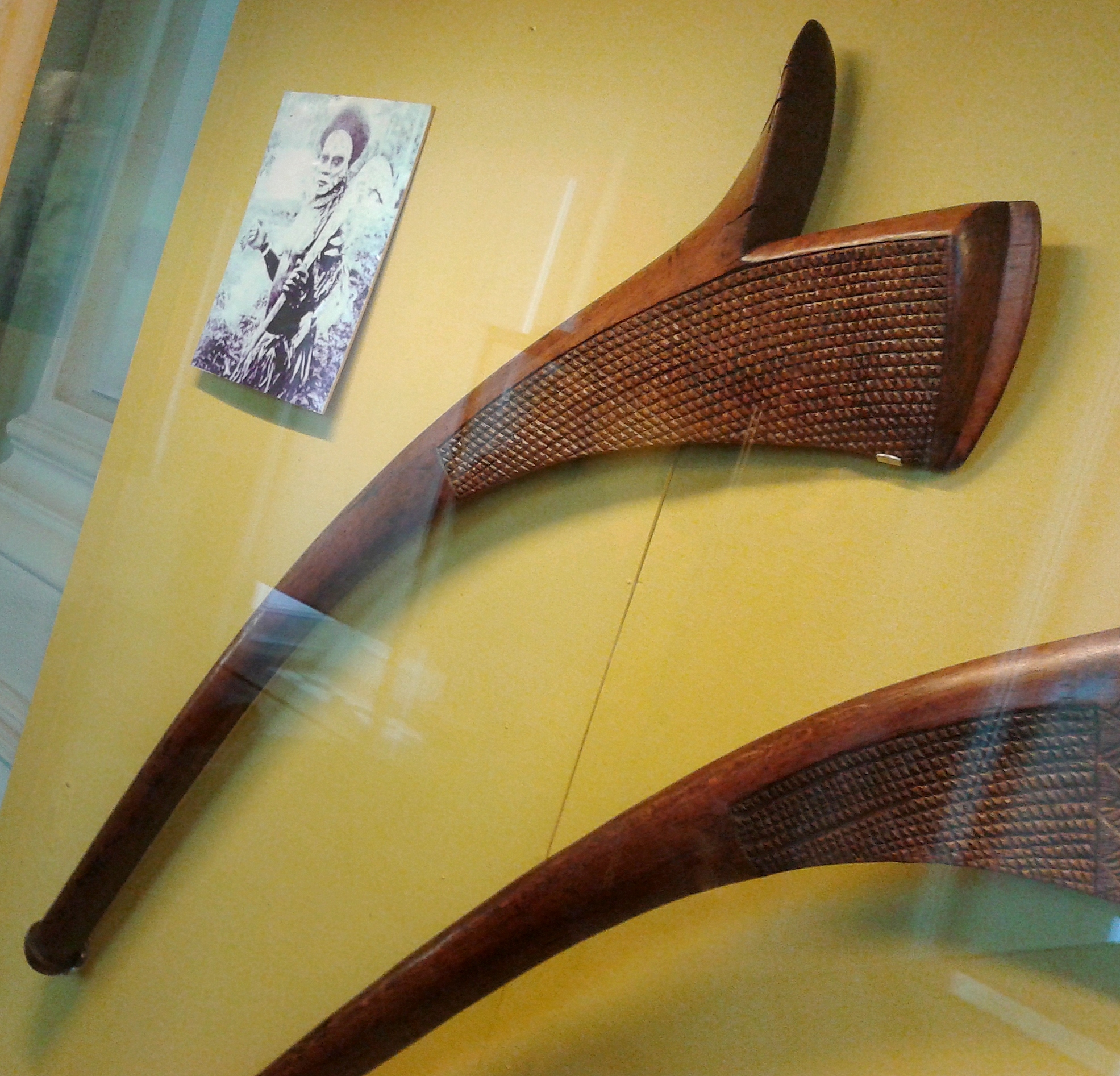
Sali, National Museum of Ethnology (Portugal).

== Uses in Fiji ==
Usually cut from a hardwood type iron wood it is intended for war. It differs from the Gata by the width of its striking head. It is named Sali because of its resemblance to the clawed flower of the plant of the same name (Sali) of the genus Musa of the banana family.

== See also ==
- Bulibuli
- Culacula
- Gata
- Gunstock War Club
- Totokia
- Ula

== Bibliography ==
- John Charles Edler, Terence Barrow, Art of Polynesia, Hemmeter Publishing Corporation, 1990.
- Rod Ewins, Fijian Artefacts: The Tasmanian Museum and Art Gallery Collection, Tasmanian Museum and Art Gallery, 1982.
- Bulletin of the Fiji Museum, Numeros 1–2, Fiji Museum, 1973.
- Fergus Clunie,Fijian weapons and warfare. Fiji Museum 2003, ISBN 978-982-208-006-3.
