= Jian (sword breaker) =

Chinese mace or club weapon

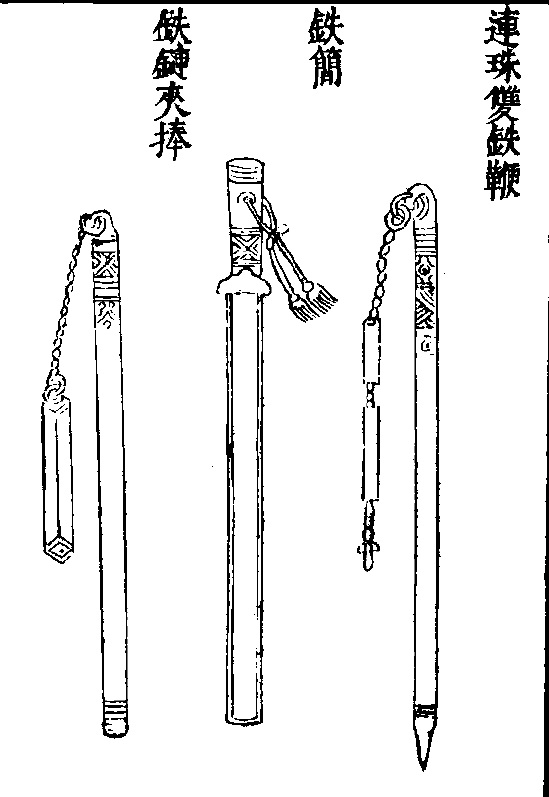
Jian (middle) depicted in Chinese military compendium Wujing Zongyao

The jian (simplified Chinese: 锏; traditional Chinese: 鐧; pinyin: jiǎn) or tie tian (鐵鐧 or 鐵簡, lit. 'iron slip'), also known as Chinese swordbreaker or Chinese truncheon, is a type of quad-edged straight mace or club specifically designed to break weapons with sharp edges. The traditional Chinese weapon has a rectangular (occasionally hollow ground) cross section with sharp corners, making it ideal to focus on damaging other weapons with brutal impact.

Some variants end with a sharp tip. It was occasionally used as a throwing weapon, which gave rise to the idiom "sa shou jian (撒手鐧, lit. 'cast away jian')" that later corrupted into "sha shou jian (殺手鐧, lit. 'killing hand jian', also translated as 'assassin's mace')".

Jian is functionally similar to Chinese whip, a type of blunt weapons in tubular shapes.

== Gallery ==
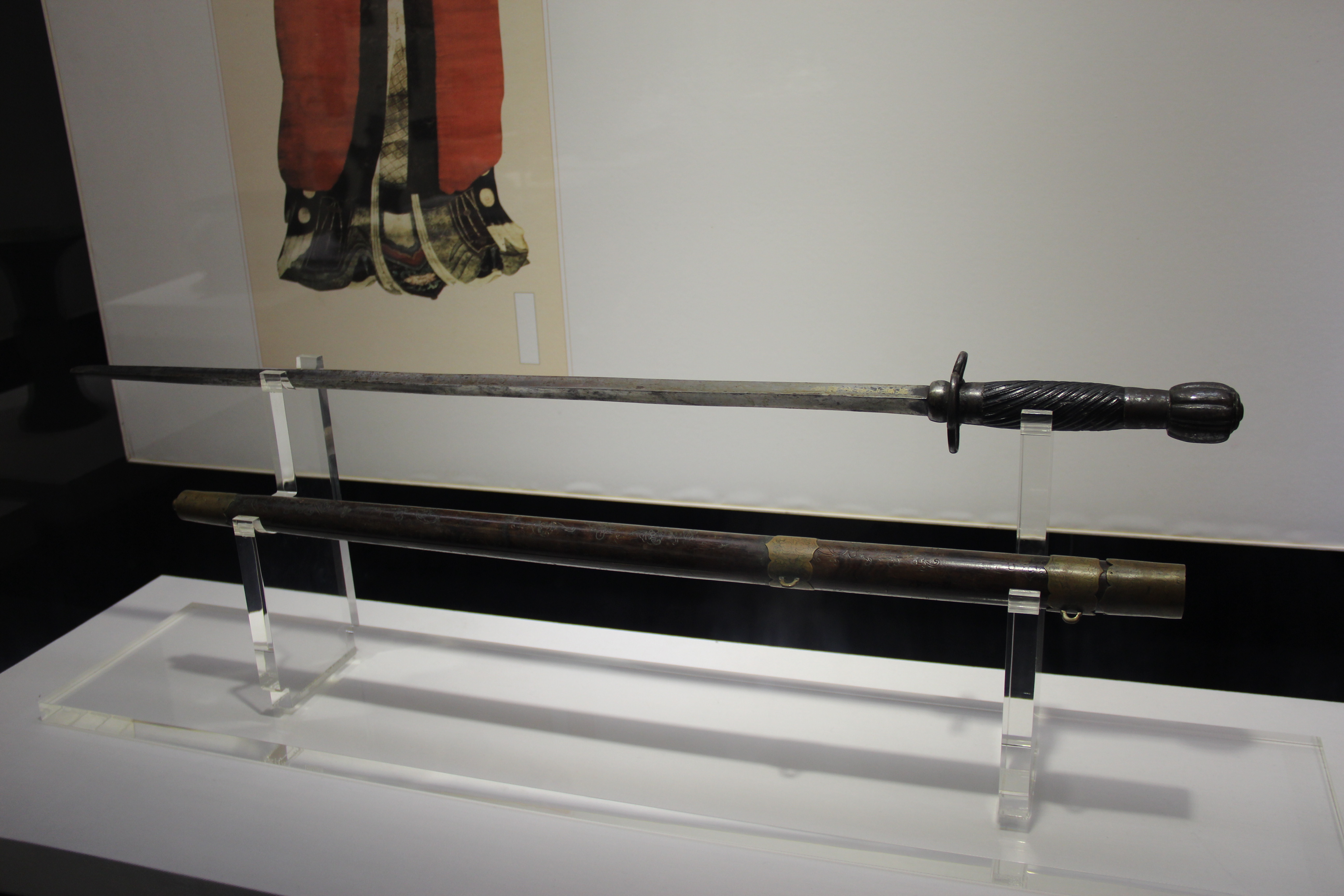
Truncheon of Chancellor Li Gang, Song dynasty

== See also ==
- Bian (weapon)
- Eighteen Arms of Wushu
- Jitte
- Swordbreaker
