= Bian (weapon) =

Chinese tubular-shaped blunt weapon

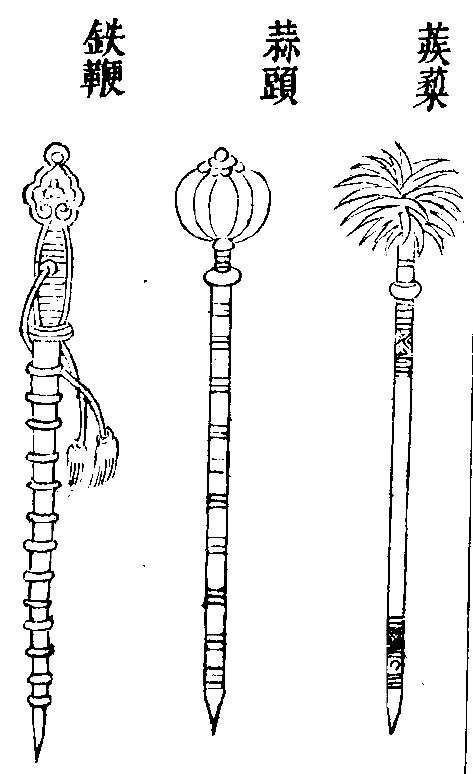
Bian (left) depicted in Chinese military compendium Wujing Zongyao

The bian (Chinese: 鞭; pinyin: biān; lit. 'whip') or tie bian (Chinese: 鐵鞭; lit. 'iron whip') and gang bian (Chinese: 鋼鞭; lit. 'steel whip'), also known as Chinese whip or hard whip, is a type of tubular-shaped club or rod weapon designed to inflict blunt damage with whipping motion.

Despite having a rigid construct, the bian whip shares its name with the horsewhip and chain whip. Thus, the weapon is sometimes translated as the hard whip to distinguish it from the others. According to the book The Chain Whip, a whip in historical text may refer to the both soft whip and hard whip due to the ambiguity in the Chinese language. "Both the hard whip and the soft whip can both be referred to simply as whip (鞭) in Chinese."

A typical whip is made with metal and has a length of around 90 centimetres (35 in). Bamboo node-like protrusions are attached to the weapon body at regular intervals to reduce the contact surface and enhance the striking effect. The whip is stiff and does not bend. It weighs 7 or 8 kilograms (15 or 18 lb) [ref?]. The weapon is used mainly on horseback with one hand, sometimes with two whips in both hands.

Comparing to the top-heavy Chinese hammer, the whip has better reach and balance. The weapon is also compatible with most forms of sword techniques, including parrying.

Whip is functionally similar to the jian, a type of blunt weapons in ancient China.

== Gallery ==
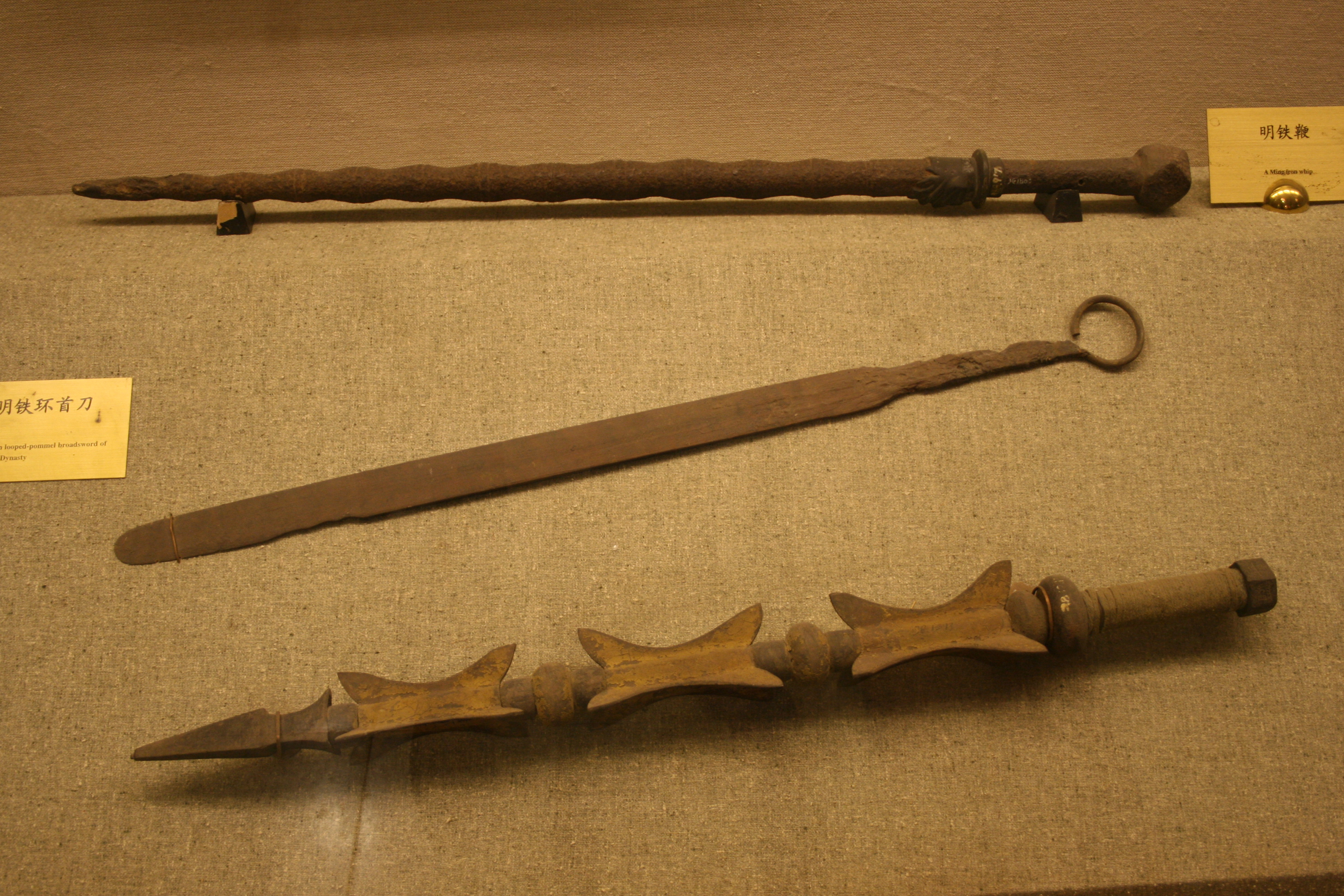
Hard whip of Ming dynasty (top and bottom)

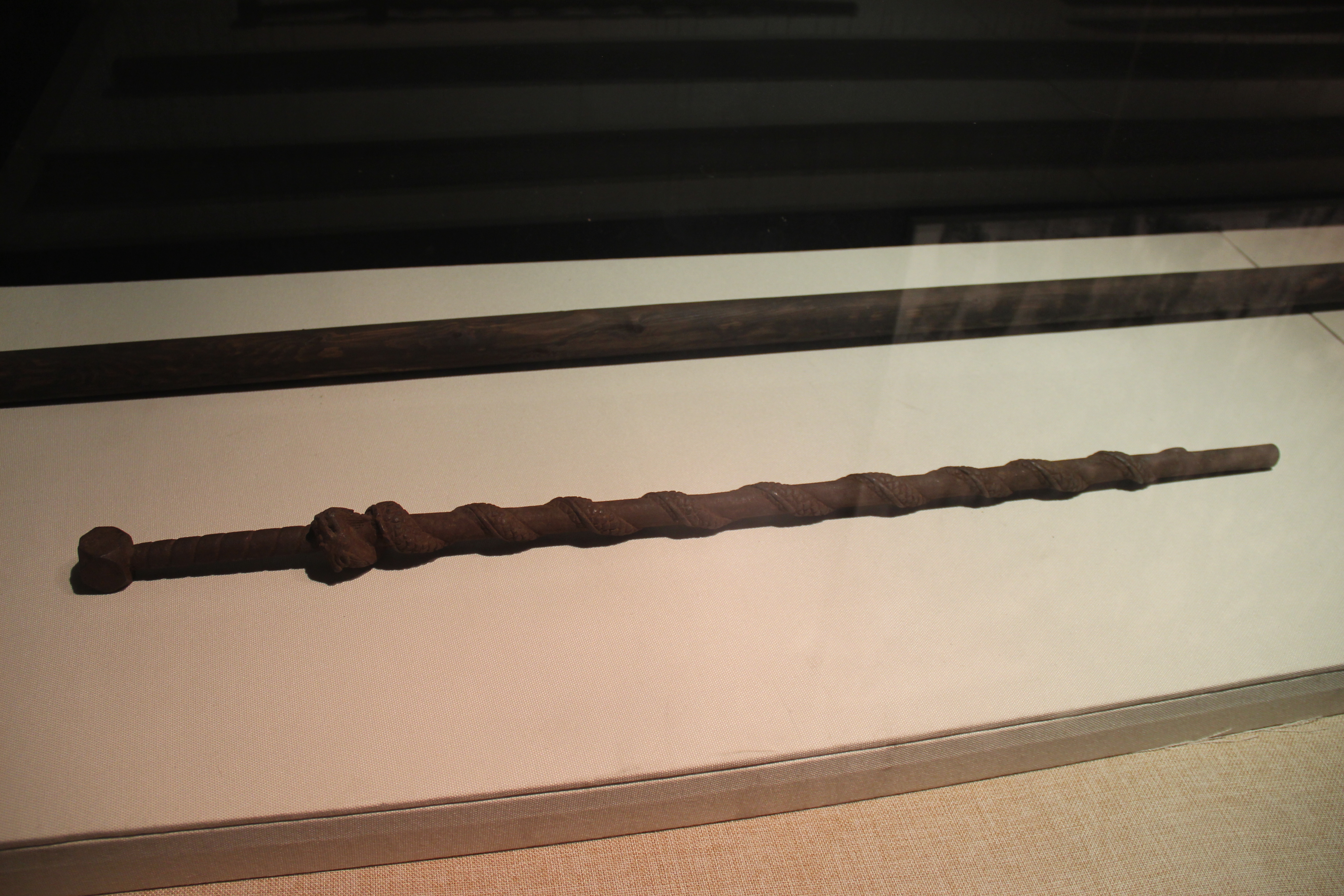
Hard whip of Ming dynasty

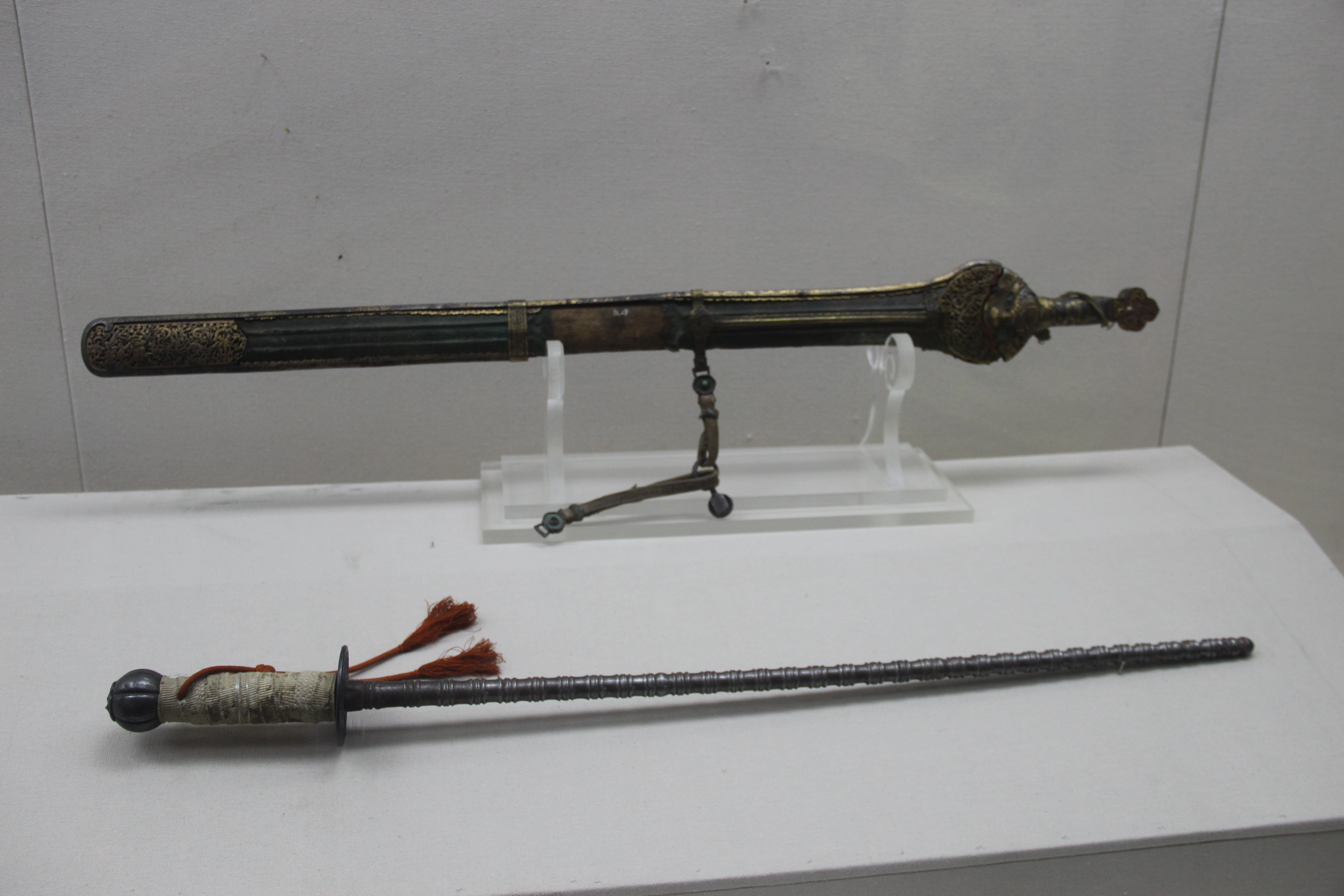
Steel whip of Qing dynasty (bottom)

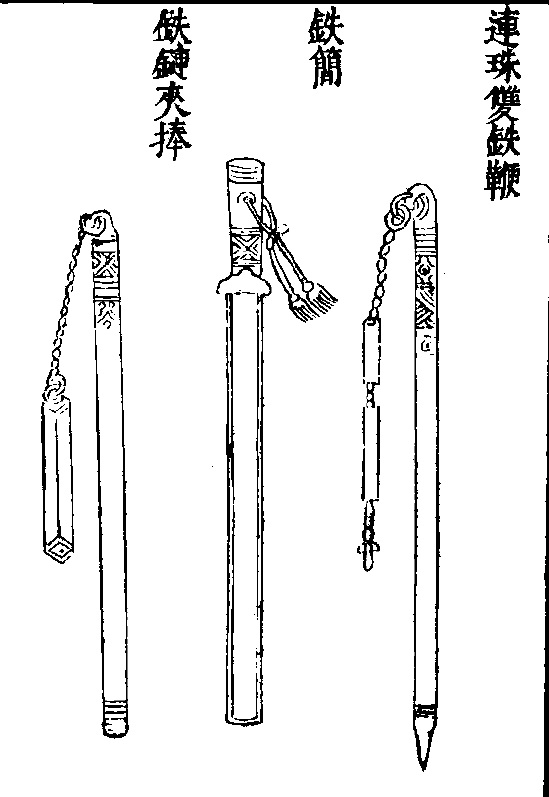
A flail-like iron whip (right) in Wujing Zongyao

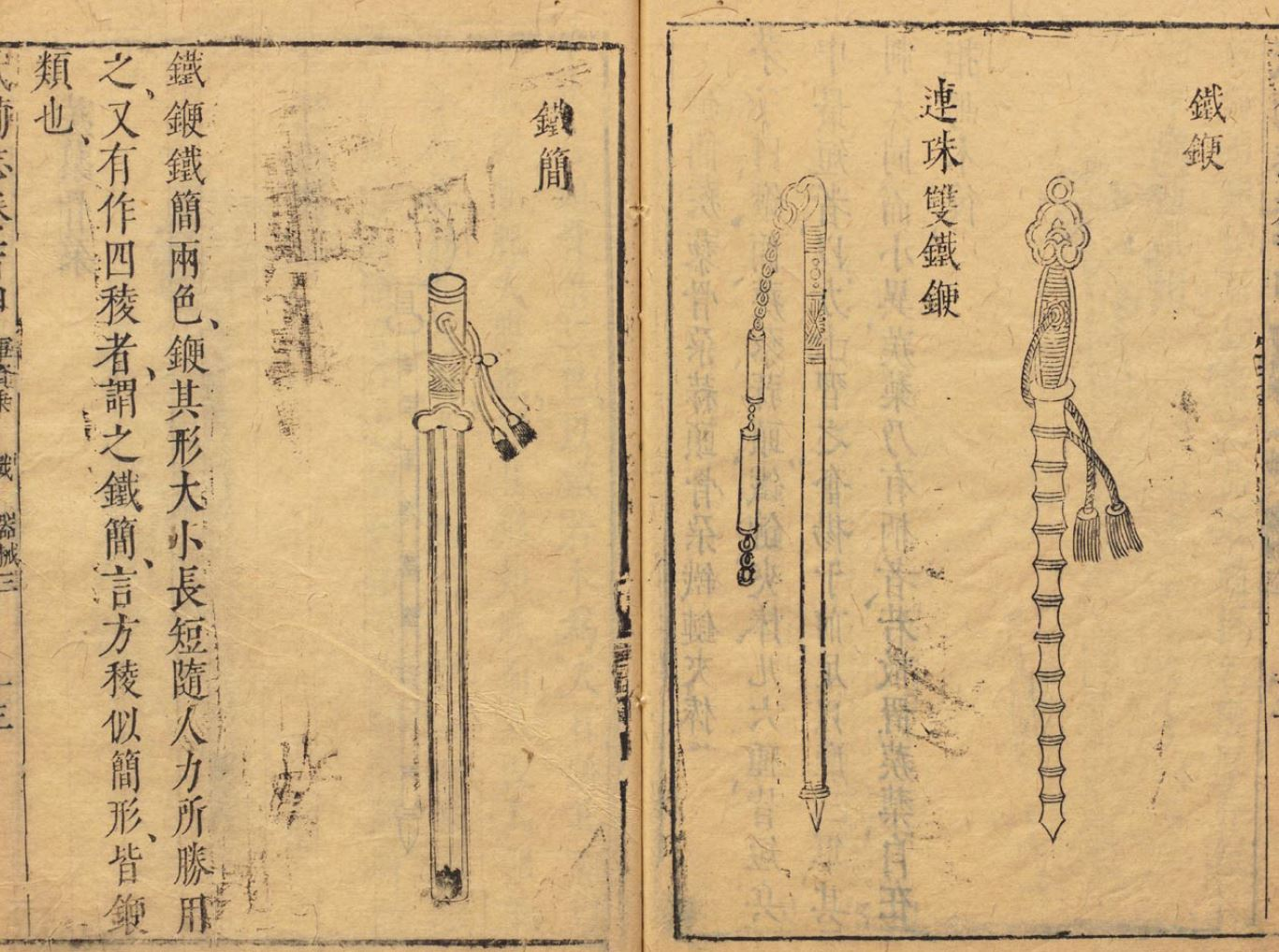
Two types of iron whips (middle and right) in military compendium Wu Bei Zhi

== See also ==
- Chain whip
- Eighteen Arms of Wushu
- Jian (sword breaker)
- Whip
