= Ula (weapon) =

The ula or i ula tavatava is a throwing war club from Fiji.

== Uses in Fiji ==
Usually cut from a hardwood type of iron wood, it has a round end made up of the root knot and is sometimes called "pineapple club" for his particular shape. It can be launched or used as a club. Some types of Ula have a smooth head.

== Gallery ==
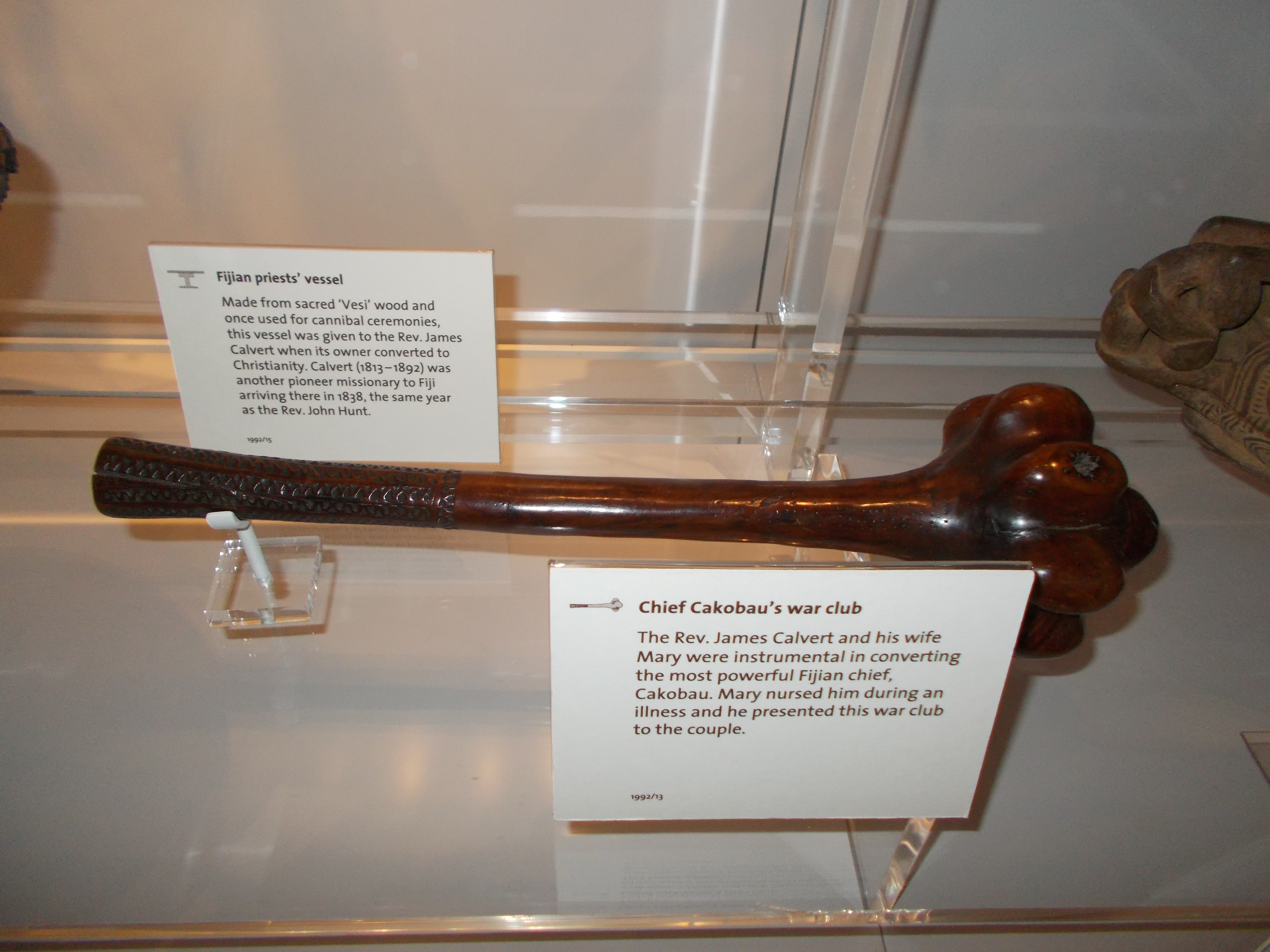
Ula with pineapple ball.

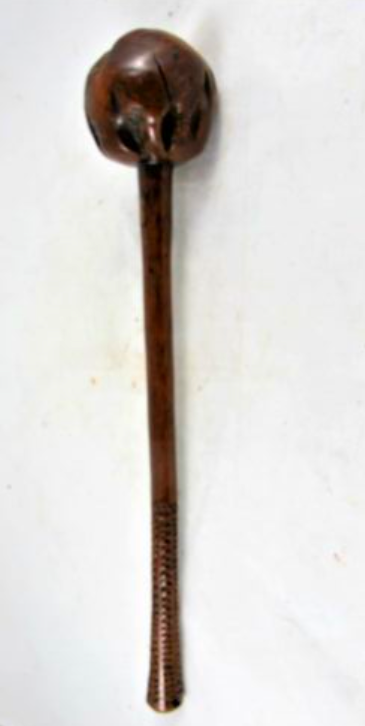
Ula with round ball.

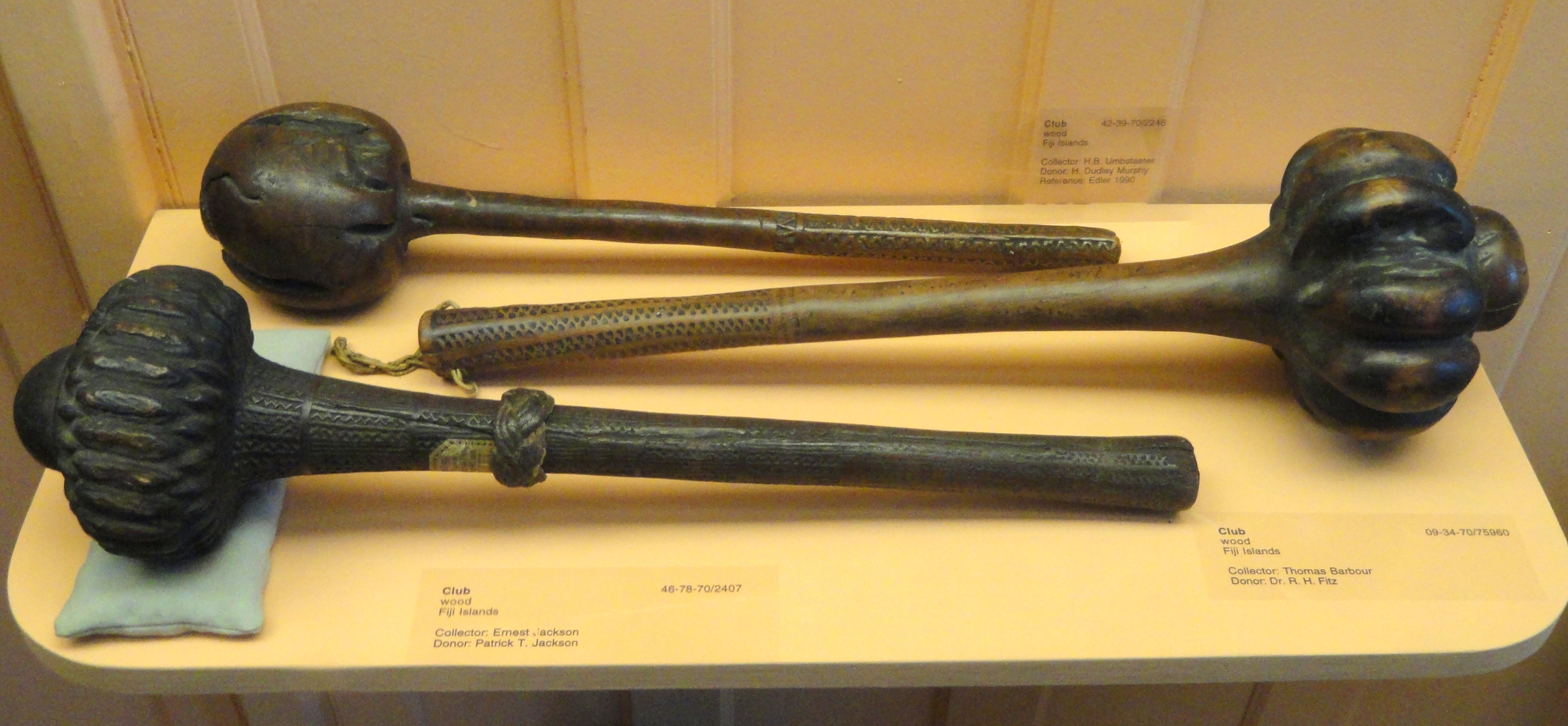
Ula collection.

== See also ==
- Bulibuli
- Culacula
- Gata
- Sali
- Totokia

== Bibliography ==
- John Charles Edler, Terence Barrow, Art of Polynesia, Hemmeter Publishing Corporation, 1990.
- Jean-Edouard Carlier, Archipels Fidji - Tonga - Samoa: La Polynésie Occidentale, Voyageurs & curieux, 2005.
- Rod Ewins, Fijian Artefacts: The Tasmanian Museum and Art Gallery Collection, Tasmanian Museum and Art Gallery, 1982.
