= Robert S. Ross =

American political scientist (born 1954)

Robert S. Ross (born April 9, 1954) is a professor of political science at Boston College, associate of the Fairbank Center for Chinese Studies at Harvard University, senior advisor of the security studies program at the Massachusetts Institute of Technology, and a member of the Council on Foreign Relations. He is one of the foremost American specialists on Chinese foreign and defense policy and U.S.-China relations.

== Bibliography ==
- Ross, Robert S. (1995). Negotiating cooperation : the United States and China, 1969-1989.
- Great Wall and Empty Fortress: China's Search for Security (with Andrew J. Nathan); 1998
- Chinese Security Policy: Structure, Power, and Politics: 2009
- — (Autumn 2018). "Nationalism, geopolitics, and naval expansionism : from the Nineteenth Century to the rise of China". Naval War College Review. 71 (4): 11–44.

As editor:

- China, the United States, and the Soviet Union: Tripolarity and Policy Making in the Cold War; 1993
- East Asia in Transition: Toward a New Regional Order; 1997
- After the Cold War: Domestic Factors and U.S.-China Relations; 1998
- Engaging China: The Management of an Emerging Power (with Alastair Iain Johnston); 1999
- Re-examining the Cold War: U.S.-China Diplomacy, 1954-1973 (with Changbin Jiang); 2001
- New Directions in the Study of China's Foreign Policy (with Alastair Iain Johnston); 2006
- China in the Era of Xi Jinping: Domestic and Foreign Policy Challenges (with Jo Inge Bekkevold); 2016.
- Strategic Adjustment and the Rise of China: Power and Politics in East Asia (with Øystein Tunsjø); 2017.
