= Gata (weapon) =

Fijian war club

The gata or gata waka is a war club from Fiji.

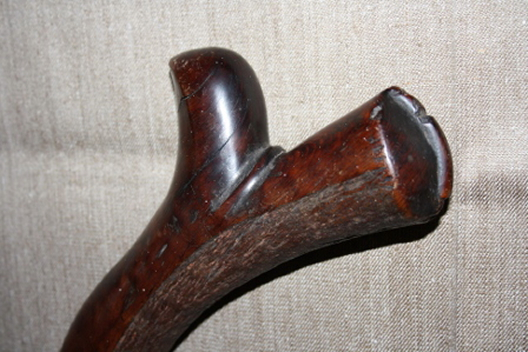
Head of Gata waka

== Uses in Fiji ==
Usually cut from hardwood, it has a snake or rifle shaped head. The word gata means snake in Fijian language. This weapon can be used for war but also for traditional dances and ceremonies. Its shape is very similar to the kiakavo used for dancing.

== Gallery ==
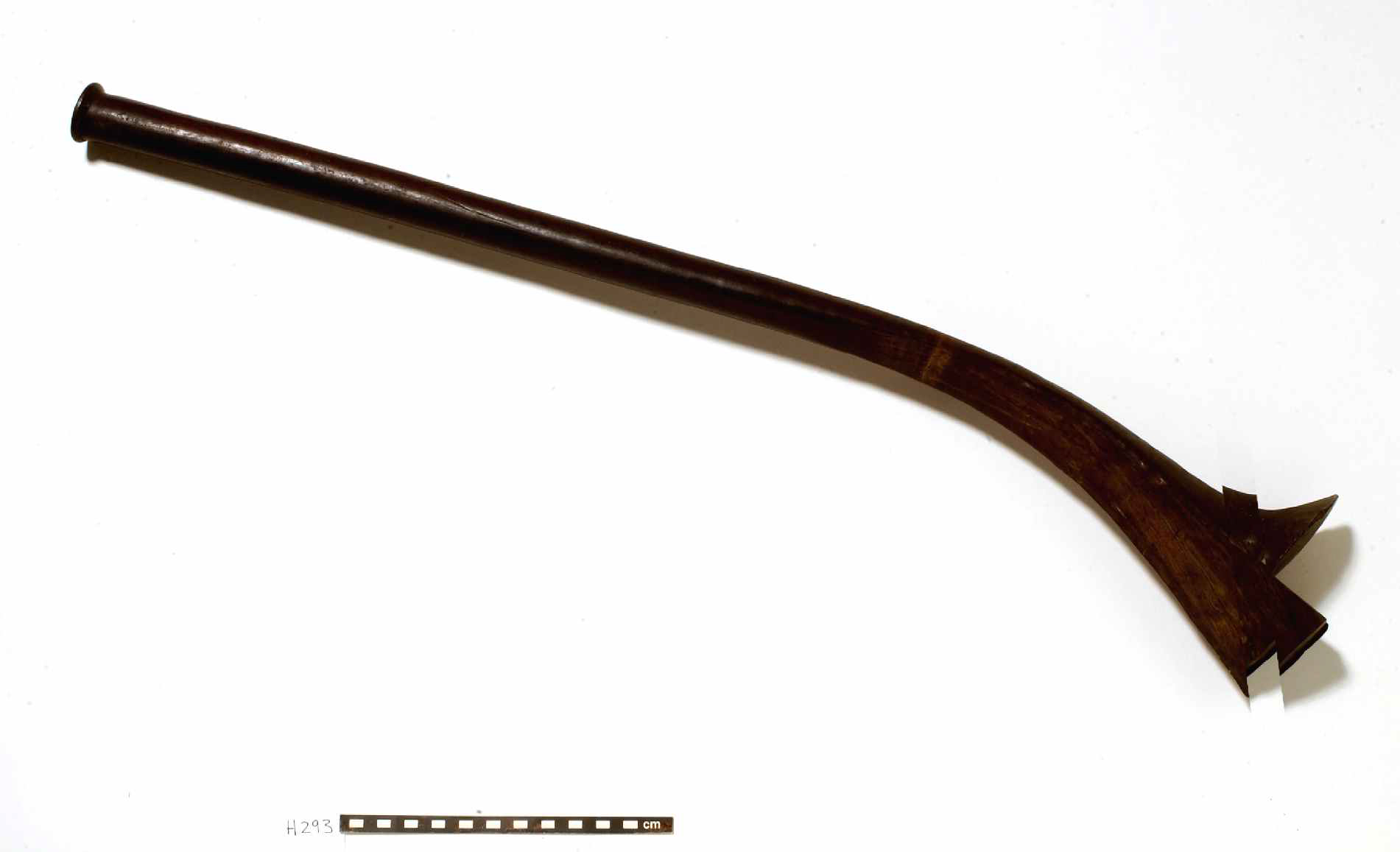
Gata

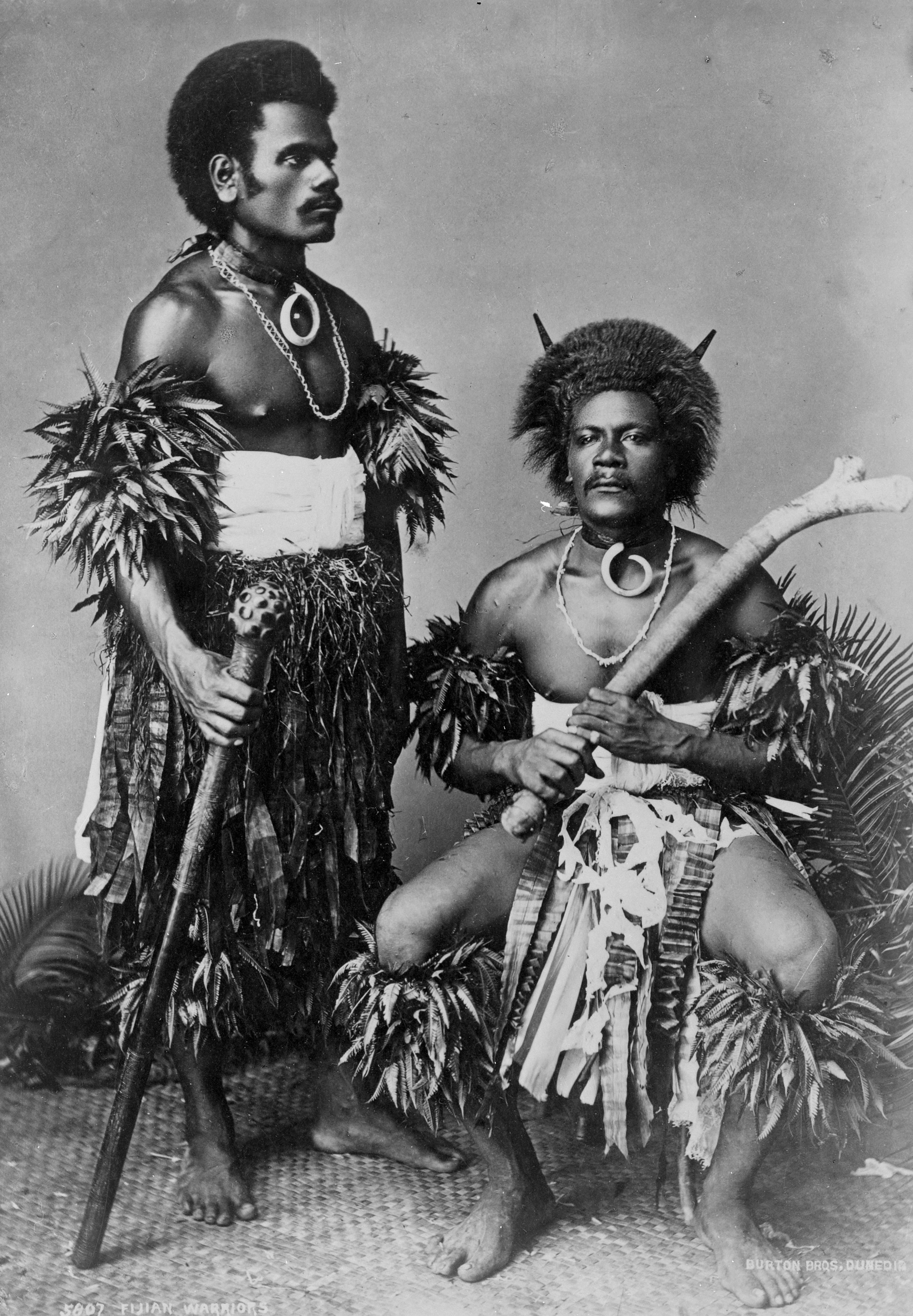
Fijian warriors, the one on the right with a gata

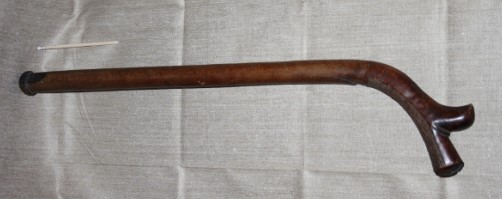
A gata waka club or a kiakavo for dancing

== See also ==
- Bulibuli
- Culacula
- Sali
- Totokia
- Ula

== Bibliography ==
- John Charles Edler, Terence Barrow, Art of Polynesia, Hemmeter Publishing Corporation, 1990.
- Rod Ewins, Fijian Artefacts: The Tasmanian Museum and Art Gallery Collection, Tasmanian Museum and Art Gallery, 1982.
- Bulletin of the Fiji Museum, Numeros 1–2, Fiji Museum, 1973.
