= Gunstock war club =

Indigenous weapon of North America

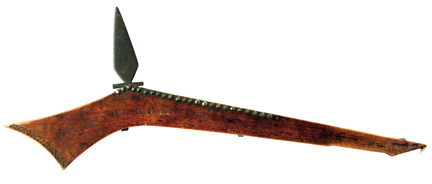
Iowa tribal gunstock war club, c. 1800–1850, Nebraska

The gunstock club or gun stock war club is an Indigenous weapon used by many Native Americans and First Nations and named for its similar appearance to the wooden stocks of muskets and rifles of the time. Gunstock clubs were most predominantly used by Eastern Woodland and Plains tribes in the 18th and 19th centuries.

== History ==
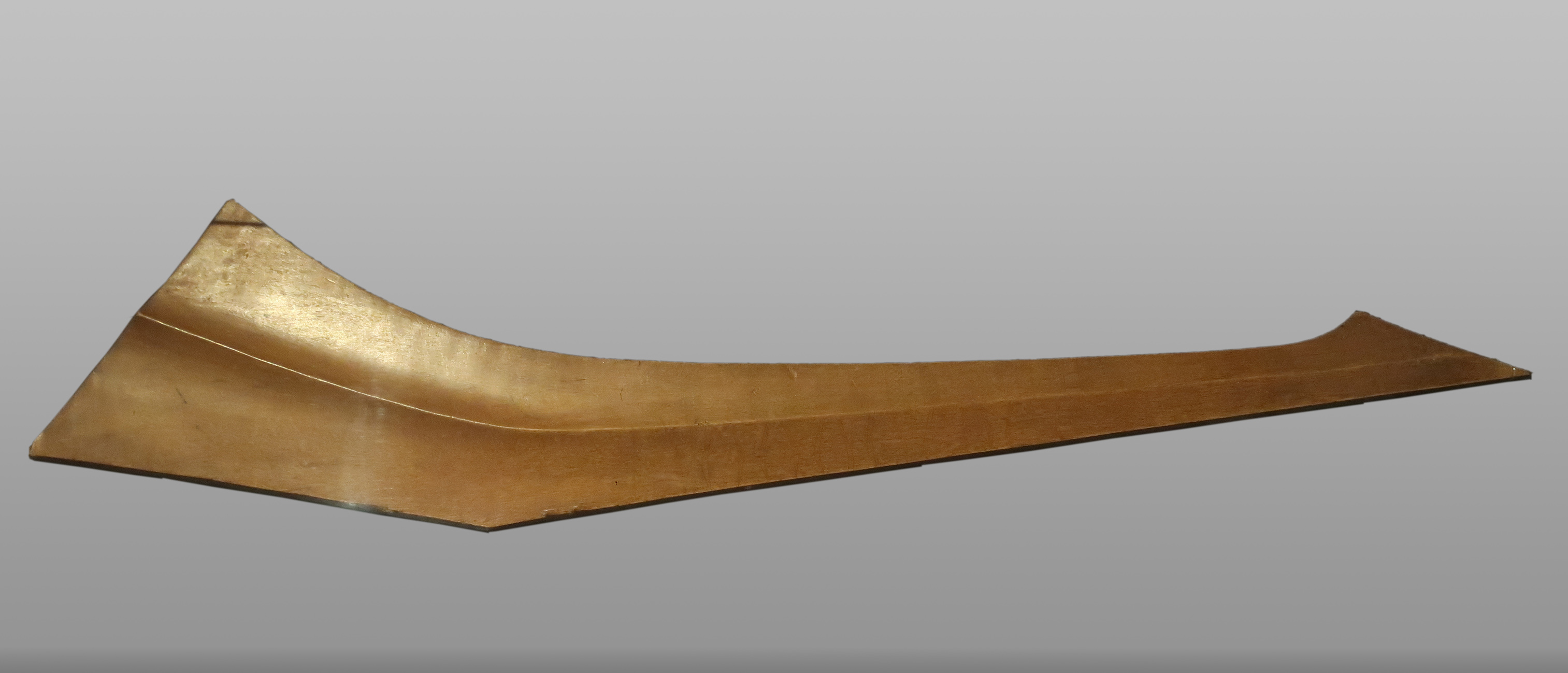
Sac gunstock war club without a spike, c. 1760

Although well known as an Indigenous weapon encountered in several Native nations across the northern United States and Canada, details of its early development continue to elude historians. They were first used in the early 17th century but were in use by Northern Plains tribes, such as the Lakota by the mid-19th century.

Many sources have claimed that Indigenous tribes created the design based upon European firearms. The tribes who encountered British, French, and colonial soldiers were impressed by their usage of a musket that, once its shot was spent, could easily be reversed, held by the metal barrel, and used as a harrowing bludgeoning weapon in close quarters combat. Other historical sources have claimed that several tribes obtained muskets from traders and later modified them into club weapons. However, with substantial holes already carved out of the crook of the gunstock—the focal striking area—for the metal loading and firing mechanisms of the musket, a club of this design would not have withstood repeated usage before breaking. Furthermore, none of the original war clubs excavated from archaeological digs have borne any indication that they started out as an actual firearm, as they lack lock and barrel inlets, and many are instead flat and board-like.

Another theory is that muskets and rifles of sixteenth-century Europeans merely provided the inspiration for the design of the gunstock war club, its designers possibly trying to capitalize on the awe and terror created by European muskets by fashioning similarly designed clubs. Carrying these clubs closely resembling European muskets, American Indian tribes might have gained a psychological advantage over rival tribes in battle.

A third theory posed by some historians and several American Indian activist groups contends that the gunstock war club is simply a coincidence of design, developed independently years before the arrival of Europeans.

== Design ==
Alongside other Indigenous weapons excelling in blunt force trauma injuries—such as the ball-head clubs and stone-head axes—the gunstock has a significant presence in tribal warfare across several American Indian nations. War clubs were usually made of straight grain hardwoods like maple, ash, oak, hickory or hornbeam (depending on the region of its use), and weighed from two to three pounds. With swinging force focused onto the small striking edges of the club, the gunstock club could hit with remarkable power. The lethality of the club was further increased by the addition of a short spear point or one or more blades positioned near the elbow of the club. Blades could be flint, horn, or iron. An inspiration for the heart-shaped blade may have been the ornate European pole-arm, the spontoon.

The introduction of forged iron and steel knives from European settlers to American Indian tribes across the United States may have contributed to the popularity of the gunstock club. For example, an excavated Plains Indian carved gunstock club from the late 19th century was found set with three butcher knife blades marked "Lamson and Goodnow Mfg. Co. Patent March 6, 1860."

Makers often embellished the clubs with brass tacks and carve the wood with geometric or representational designs.

== In use today ==
In Native American society, gunstock clubs are used as part of powwow regalia or in other formal occasions.

The gunstock war club is the primary weapon of practitioners of Okichitaw, a martial art based on the fighting techniques of the Assiniboine and Plains Cree Indians. It was recently rejuvenated by Canadian martial artist George J. Lépine.

== See also ==
- Buttstroke
- Pistol-whipping
- Sali (weapon)
