= Lumencraft =

- Industry: Manufacturing
- Products: Flashlights

Lumencraft Inc. is a flashlight manufacturer producing LED flashlights. Lumencraft lights are Swiss designed and US built and target the luxury/high end market of the flashlight industry, with prices as high as $370 for a single flashlight.

== History ==
The company was founded by an American aerospace engineer and a Swiss designer in 2006 and is incorporated in the state of California. Lumencraft lights are typically pre-ordered with individual serial numbers assigned to each light. Popular Mechanics has referred to Lumencraft as the Rolex of Flashlights.

== Application ==
The nature of Lumencraft products can be seen in the use of materials such as titanium and carbon fiber and aerospace manufacturing processes and technologies. Some of Lumencraft's products, such as the GatLight, have up to 80 individual parts, including custom machined metal parts. Lumencraft uses computer-aided design as well as photon and thermal simulation technologies.

== See also ==
- AceBeam
- Surefire
- Streamlight
