= Blunt instrument =

Any solid object used as a weapon

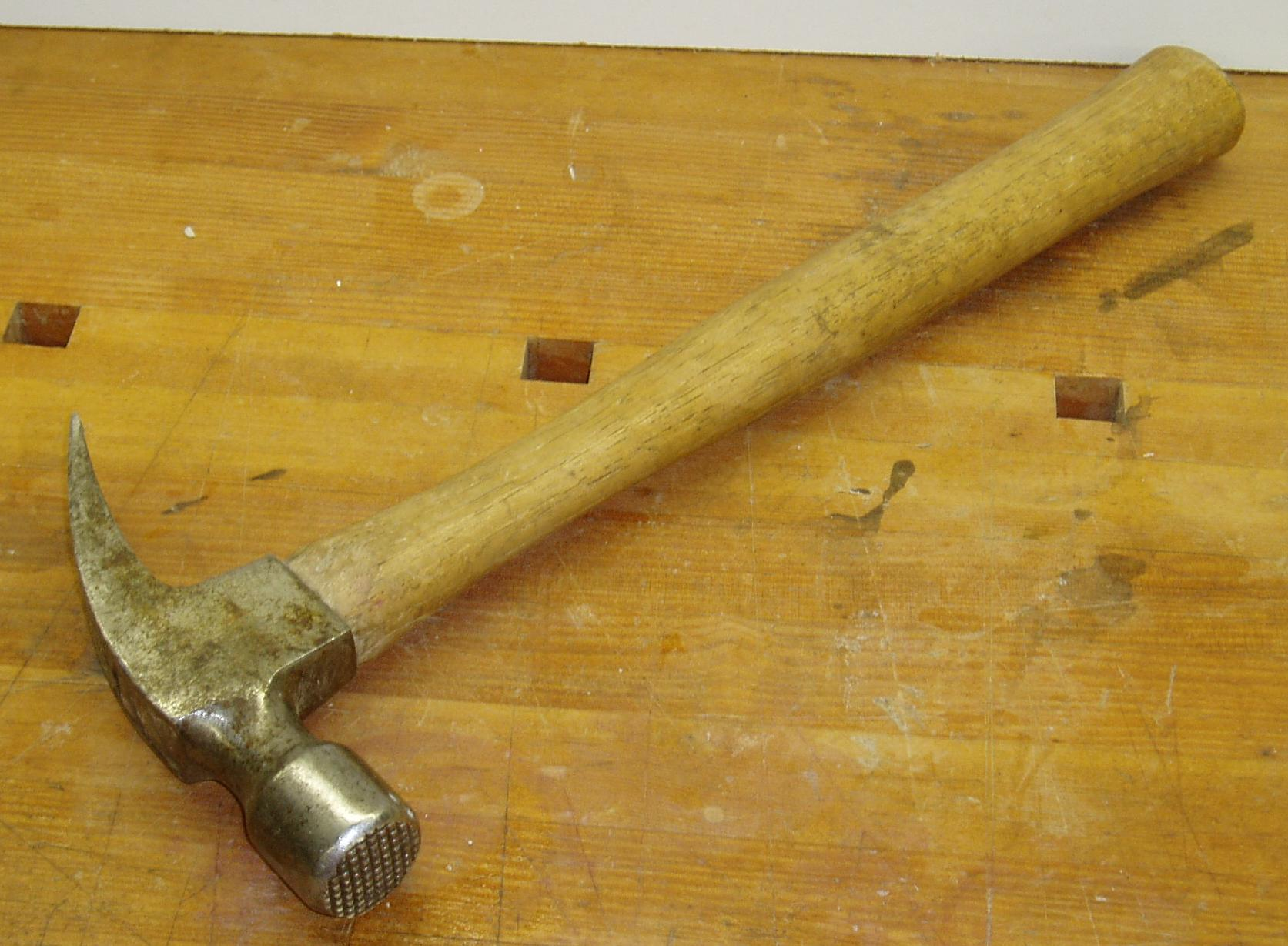
A hammer could be used as a blunt instrument

A blunt instrument is any solid object that can be used as a hand tool, weapon or thrown projectile for striking a target, exerts impact via direct transfer of force and momentum, and has no sharp point or edge on the contact surface with the target. A blunt weapon may be contrasted with edged weapons in that the former causes mostly closed trauma instead of open incisions or puncture wounds, and are also different to kinetic projectiles such as bullets or arrows, whose speed and kinetic energy are so significant that they cause penetrating trauma often with cavitations even if the projectile is of a blunt shape.

Blunt instruments typically inflict blunt force trauma, causing contusions, fractures and internal bleeding while leaving the skin intact, although they occasionally can produce irregular lacerations by shearing. Depending on the parts of the body struck, organs may be ruptured or otherwise damaged, and attacks with a blunt instrument may be fatal, especially when striking vital areas such as the head, neck and chest.

== Examples ==
Some sorts of blunt instruments are very readily available, and often figure in crime cases. Examples of blunt instruments include:

- Personal implements such as walking sticks
- Tools such as hammers, crowbars, pipe wrenches, or heftier flashlights such as the Maglite or Kel-Lite
- Parts of tools, such as pickaxe handles
- Sports equipment such as cricket bat or baseball bats, hockey sticks, pool cues, golf clubs, etc.
- Weapons such as batons, bâton français, spears (using the haft), or guns (see firearm as a blunt weapon)
- Other items, such as rocks, stones, bricks, millwall bricks or tree branches.

== In popular culture ==
Maxwell's Silver Hammer is a novelty song by The Beatles that describes murders by blunt force and the subsequent trial of the perpetrator.
