= Kel-Lite =

Heavy-duty aluminum flashlight

- Industry: Illumination Tools; Tactical Equipment
- Founder: Donald Keller; Frank Patti
- Successor: Streamlight
- Headquarters: San Dimas (1968–70); Covina (1970–73); Barstow (1973–83); California, U.S.
- Products: Flashlights; Weapon-mounted lights

Kel-Lite was the first heavy-duty aluminum bodied flashlight, which became popular with law enforcement agencies due to its heavy construction. They were designed to be carried in place of a police baton and also provide light. The eponymous company, founded by Donald Keller and Frank Patti in 1968, manufactured Kel-Lite flashlights in southern California until 1983, when the company was merged into Streamlight.

== History ==
The Kel-Lite was a highly-durable, weather- and shock-resistant flashlight (torch), made of heavy 6061-T6 aluminium. According to company founder Donald Keller, a Los Angeles County Deputy Sheriff, he began working on the concept in 1964 as he was tired of the lack of durability of the generically available, cheap metal flashlights of the day; the prototype was largely designed by 1968. Keller's primary concern was to develop the flashlight as a defensive tool; the illumination provided an ancillary benefit. Keller contracted a machine shop in Covina owned by Frank Patti to produce a few prototypes to ensure costs were sufficiently low, making adjustments to the prototype designs based on input from law enforcement officers. By late 1968, Keller and Patti founded the Kel-Lite Corporation, with Patti handling manufacturing and Keller assembly and marketing. Initial prices ranged from $12.95 (for the 2-cell model) to $18.95 (for the 7-cell model). Keller paid a commission of $1 to each police officer that convinced another to purchase a light.

As demand grew, prices increased to allow for dealer markup, with quantity discounts provided. The small head Kel-Lite (SKL) was introduced in 1970, and the company also began marketing law enforcement equipment such as speedloaders and traffic wand attachments. The business grew beyond Keller's ability to manage it, and Norm Nelson was hired as general manager in 1971; during a board meeting in January 1972, Keller was ousted and Nelson became company president. After Keller left in 1972, he continued designing lights for a new company (Pro-Light, 1973), later moving on to Maglite (1979), Brinkmann, and ASP.

The second generation Kel-Lite was designed by Norm Nelson in 1973, featuring a battery charger, adjustable lens, baton lights, and a push button switch. It was marketed in three sizes (DKL (D-Cell Kel-Lite), MKL (Medium Head Kel-Lite), SKL (Small Head Kel-Lite)) and penlight versions. The company merged in 1983 with Streamlight. Kel-Lite had manufacturing capability and Streamlight a marketing team.

The first Kel-Lites were made in San Dimas, California in 1968. Then the company moved to Covina, California in 1970 as demand increased, and on to Barstow, California in 1973 to a larger facility with a full service machine shop, plating, assembly line and shipping department.

Surviving Kel-Lites are still in use worldwide, with the final design by Norm Nelson, marketed by Streamlight as the Excalibur, sold into the early 1990s. A similar model, also designed by Keller, was sold as the Brinkmann "Legend" series of flashlights.

=== Design progression ===
==== 1st generation ====
Designed by Don Keller from 1969-1972; models included the Large Head (KL) D-cell model, the Small Head (SKL) D-cell, and the C cell (CPL) models. All flashlights used from 2 to 7 cells, and were available in black, blue, silver, and gold anodized finishes. A special 1-cell model was available using two 1/2-D cells.

The first generation were produced in both San Dimas and Covina and featured plastic slide switches. Later models of the 1st generation lights were also produced for a short time in Barstow. If manufactured in San Dimas, that was stamped on the barrel behind the switch. Covina & Barstow-produced models had the location stamped in the tail cap.

==== 2nd generation ====
Switch design by Norm Nelson from 74-83, using the same head styles as above and added a medium head. Also included the Baton Light and Stud Light. Metal slide switches. Produced in Barstow, CA.

==== 3rd generation ====
Designed by Nelson & Streamlight, 1983 until approx. 1985. Medium head only with push button switch. Produced in Barstow and Norristown, Pennsylvania. Kel-Lite attempted to get into the rechargeable market with a tail cap charger, only a few were actually sold.

== Technology ==
The Kel-Lite was intended as a replacement for the baton carried by police officers. The series of Baton Light models (available in various lengths from 18 to 26 inches) were designed by Norm Nelson in 1973 as a direct replacement, which would fit into a standard baton ring on the officer's belt. Kel-Lites were available in sizes ranging from a model using two "1/2 D" cells (together the length of one D) to those using 7 D cells, and any size in between, as well as C cell models. A total of 49 different models were made.

Prior to the Kel-Lite, flashlights were relatively fragile and undependable, usually made either of molded plastic or stamped sheet metal. Dropping one would usually break the bulb, and dents would often lead to frequent replacement. Keller designed the Kel-Lite to be robust. Salesmen trained by Keller would demonstrate this for public safety customers by pounding large nails into a block of wood, while the light was operating. Other demonstrations included throwing the light as hard as possible across a concrete parking lot, or turning the light on and putting it into an aquarium and driving over it with a truck.

In Wellington v. Daniels, testifying for the plaintiff, who had been permanently paralyzed after being struck with a Kel-Lite in 1981, a criminologist expert witness stated that several police departments had banned Kel-Lites because using it as a weapon could cause death or severe injury.

Nelson also produced a flashlight targeted for the truck driver known as the Stud-Lite, which was a Kel-Lite flashlight with a different name, and anodized finish. This model was also very popular and sold in truck stops, truck dealerships and parts houses.

The success of the Kel-Lite led to the rise of competition, primarily Maglite and Streamlight, who improved on Keller's basic concept. Streamlight opted for high-output models using rechargeable battery and halogen bulb technology. Maglite developed an improved switch and a variable-focus system, allowing a single light to be used for a high-intensity flashlight or wide-angle lantern. Mag-Lite later developed their own high-output rechargeable, as the police market converted entirely to that style of flashlight. A decade later a new company, Laser Products, miniaturized the tactical flashlight with their SureFire series.

These more advanced and mass-produced products eventually took over the market. Kel-Lites were one of the more durable makes and large numbers are still in use today. They remain popular on the used market both as working flashlights and collectibles. A Kel-Lite torch was also mounted on the High Standard Model 10B bullpup shotgun.

== See also ==
- Tactical light
