= Zlarin =

- Sunset on Zlarin
- Interactive map of Zlarin
- Location within Croatia
- Coordinates: 43°41′N 15°51′E
- Country: Croatia
- County: Šibenik-Knin County
- Municipality: Šibenik

Area
  - Total: 8.19 km^{2} (3.16 sq mi)
- Elevation: 174 m (571 ft)

Population (2021)
  - Total: 293
  - Density: 35.8/km^{2} (92.7/sq mi)
- Time zone: UTC+1 (CET)
  - Summer (DST): UTC+2 (CEST)
- Postal code: 22232
- Area code: (+385) 22

Zlarin is a small island off the Dalmatian coast of Croatia near the mainland city of Šibenik. Administratively, it is part of Šibenik-Knin County. In the winter time, the island has a population of 284, but from March to October its population grows substantially to 1,500 people, mainly because people relocate from Šibenik in the warmer months. Zlarin has a large expatriate community.

Zlarin's highest point is Klepac at 174 metres (571 feet) above sea level. During bright and sunny days, Mount Velebit and volcanic Jabuka island in the Adriatic Sea are visible from this point. Zlarin has many fig and cypress trees, as well as other natural plants. Inner parts of the island are uninhabited and covered with thick forest. Zlarin is one of few islands on the Adriatic Sea that do not allow access to cars, tractors are the main source of transportation on the island.

== Geographical position ==
With an area of 8.19 square kilometres (3.16 square miles), and 18.7 km (11.6 mi) of coastline, Zlarin is the third largest island of the Šibenik archipelago, south-west from Šibenik in middle Dalmatia. It is situated approximately 2 kilometres (1 mile) away from the mainland.

In the administrative and territorial partition of Croatia, Zlarin belongs to the Šibenik-Knin County, more precisely to the city of Šibenik. The island is connected to the mainland cities of Šibenik and Vodice by ferry, which runs between 2 to 6 times a day.

== History ==
=== Stone age ===
Zlarin’s rich history dates back to the Stone Age, testified by two stone axes typical of the period.

People of the Stone Age, living on the edges of the fields in simple shelters, worked the land and domesticated animals.

=== Bronze age and antiquity ===
At the beginning of the Bronze Age, in the third millennia BC, their way of life was shattered by Nomads, Illyrians. They erected gračine – hillforts located at the top of the hills, used as means to control the cattle, but also as watchtowers in case of attacks from the sea.

Because of limitations of the fields and pastures, the island had low population density in the period of Classical antiquity. Only with the dissemination of the olive tree and grapevine in the age of Romans, as well as with fishing and advancements in salt production, did the population grow.

Most of the archeological findings in the area consist of graves from the period of Classical antiquity. These graves had fragments of amphorae that most often carried the manufacturer’s seal, which made it possible to determine the approximate age of a certain finding. A headstone from the Roman era, incorporated into the wall of the Drago castle, has also been found.

As a result of a shipwreck off the east coast of Zlarin, in Platac bay, abundant remnants of the merchant ship (cargo ship) from the first century AD have been discovered.

The end of the Late Antiquity period is in these areas marked by the arrival of Pannonian Avars in Dalmatia at the beginning of the 7th century. What ensued were references to Croats.

=== Origin of name ===
The first mention of the name Zlarin is a reference of Zlarin as a constituent part of Šibenik, in Croatian-Hungarian king Bele IV’s document “Privilegije“ from 1245.

There are numerous theories regarding the origin of the name; from the Phoenician origin (Zarim –archipelago), to Golden Island (Insula auri) by Juraj Šižgorić, and finally to the theory of there being Narentine pirates on the island who, for the purposes of easier navigation in uncharted waters, named places using familiar names of their homeland. Other sources also confirm that this beautiful island and its bay were an ideal harbor to the pirates of the time as a starting point for robbing the coast. Following the traces of the name, the field Zlarin on the river Neretva was discovered, with village Klepci above it (today the name refers to the highest hill point on the island), near Velež mountains (an island bay).

=== Medieval inhabitants ===
First notarial records date to 1386 and include the first mention of last names of some Zlarin and Šibenik inhabitants – vineyard owners. In the same year, there are also records of Zlarin’s Church of St. Marija, built by the pleb Juraj (secular priest), owner of the estate, on the foundations of the Late Antiquity edifice. Due to the overall situation and the first Ottoman invasions to Šibenik area, Zlarin got populated by a larger number of inhabitants.

The first settlements were made in Kotor area (next to corral, first farmers’ settlements) and in Borovice, traditionally further away from the coast for the purposes of easier protection and working the land.

=== 15th and 16th centuries ===
At the beginning of the 15th century, village (villa) Zlarin had 20 houses and over 70 inhabitants, and soon there was a need for a new, larger church; so, in 1448 Our Lady of Rašelj Church was built.

As people were running away from Turks, in the 15th and 16th ct., the inhabitants of surrounding and neighboring areas temporarily populated the islands; however, some of them stayed, thus increasing the number of inhabitants.

=== 17th and 18th century ===
In the 17th and 18th ct. the economy was constantly developing, mainly relying on viticulture, olive growing, fishing, maritime transport and harvesting corals, today Zlarin’s brand.

=== 19th century ===
Viticulture became the island’s main industry, especially in the 19th ct. when a huge demand for wine in the European market fostered the grubbing up of land on and in the island’s surrounding areas, the areas of Srima, Zablaće, but also on smaller islands, Sestrice and Obonjan.

At the beginning of the 19th ct. Zlarin became municipal center, got a telegraph station, post office, primary school, and the operational quay was built in Zlarin harbor, suitable for docking of sailboats, large steamboats, but also battleships of the then Austro-Hungarian fleet. With the development of port infrastructure at the end of the 19th ct., after Šibenik’s, Zlarin’s port became the most significant one in the district in regards to its maritime traffic.

The central market of the Mediterranean style was made in front of today’s Leroja, and the island’s life was revolving around the port and coast. The place was taking form of an island small town. In the eastern part of the Zlarin field, in the inland of the island, a small village Borovica was becoming more prominent, and its poor, hard-working inhabitants long kept their customs, traditional costumes, legends and songs alive due to their position.

=== 20th century ===
The later spread of pathogen of grapevine wood, phylloxera and grape downy mildew, the collapse of traditional sailboats followed by the arrival of foreign steamboats and cheap foreign olive oil were all causes of mass emigration of islanders to the North and South America. Emigration in the next period of the 20th ct. marked the island’s life. Men, leaving behind their mothers and young wives together with their children, were immigrating mostly to overseas countries in pursuit of a better life.

During the Second World War, the inhabitants of Zlarin resisted the Fascist occupation, many of them losing their lives in the process. After the war, many Zlarinians reached high positions in the Yugoslav Army and Navy. During the war, Zlarin was bombed several times.

== Traditions ==
Zlarin is famous for its red corals. In summer, when many tourists are on the island, one may witness a ceremony that is held for sailors who are going to the sea at night to find corals. Dalmatian songs are sung, and men and women are dressed in folk costumes typical of the area. The ceremony is held to wish luck to the sailors.

Traditional clothes are usually made of light fabric with three different colors, black, red and white. Women's clothes are profusely decorated. It is customary to wear gold necklaces and earrings with folk clothes, as well as white socks and black shoes. Ladies wear knives on the back of folk clothes.

Each year the yacht club of Zlarin organizes three boat regattas, "Zlarinska regata krstaša", "Latinskin idrun na kureja" and New Year "Zlarinska regata krstaša". "Latinskin idrun na kureja" is reserved for wooden boats built on old, exclusively hand-made traditional ways, and propelled by Latin sail (mainsail, triangular sail).

=== Ship gallery ===
2006. Latinskin idrun na kureja regatta
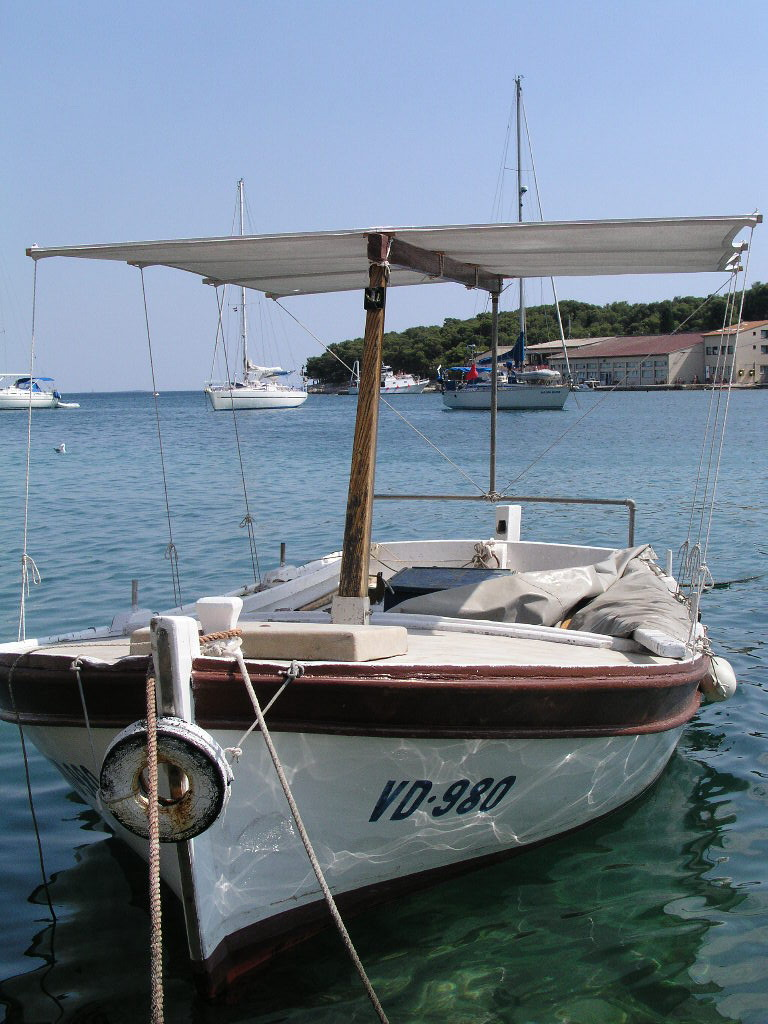
Leut

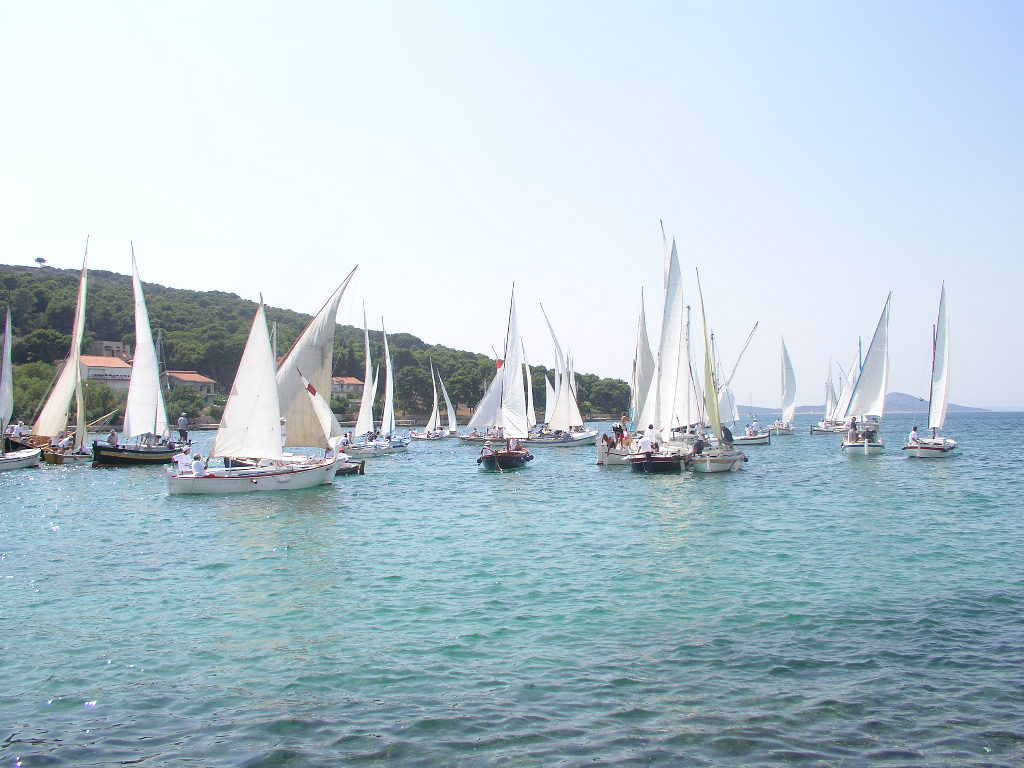
Latin regatta1

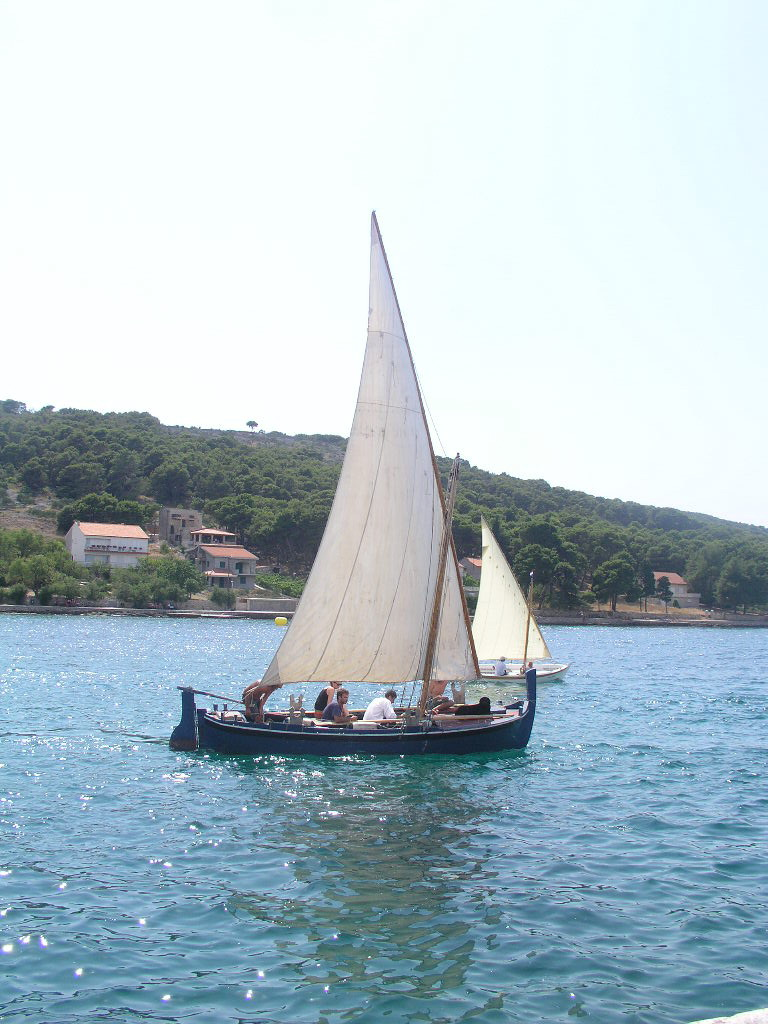
Latin regatta2

== Demographics ==
In 2021, its population was 293.

Zlarin: Population trends 1857–2021
v

population	1643	3063	1684	1819	1829	1846	1980	1480	896	914	920	635	399	359	276	284	293
	1857	1869	1880	1890	1900	1910	1921	1931	1948	1953	1961	1971	1981	1991	2001	2011	2021

Sources: Croatian Bureau of Statistics publications

== Notable people from Zlarin ==
- Anthony Maglica, entrepreneur, founder of Maglite
- Ivica Matković (1913–1945), Ustaša concentration camp commandant
- Jagoda Kaloper, painter, actress
- Vesna Parun, poet
- Bryan Yurcan, journalist
- Robert P. Katica, Architect

== Gallery ==
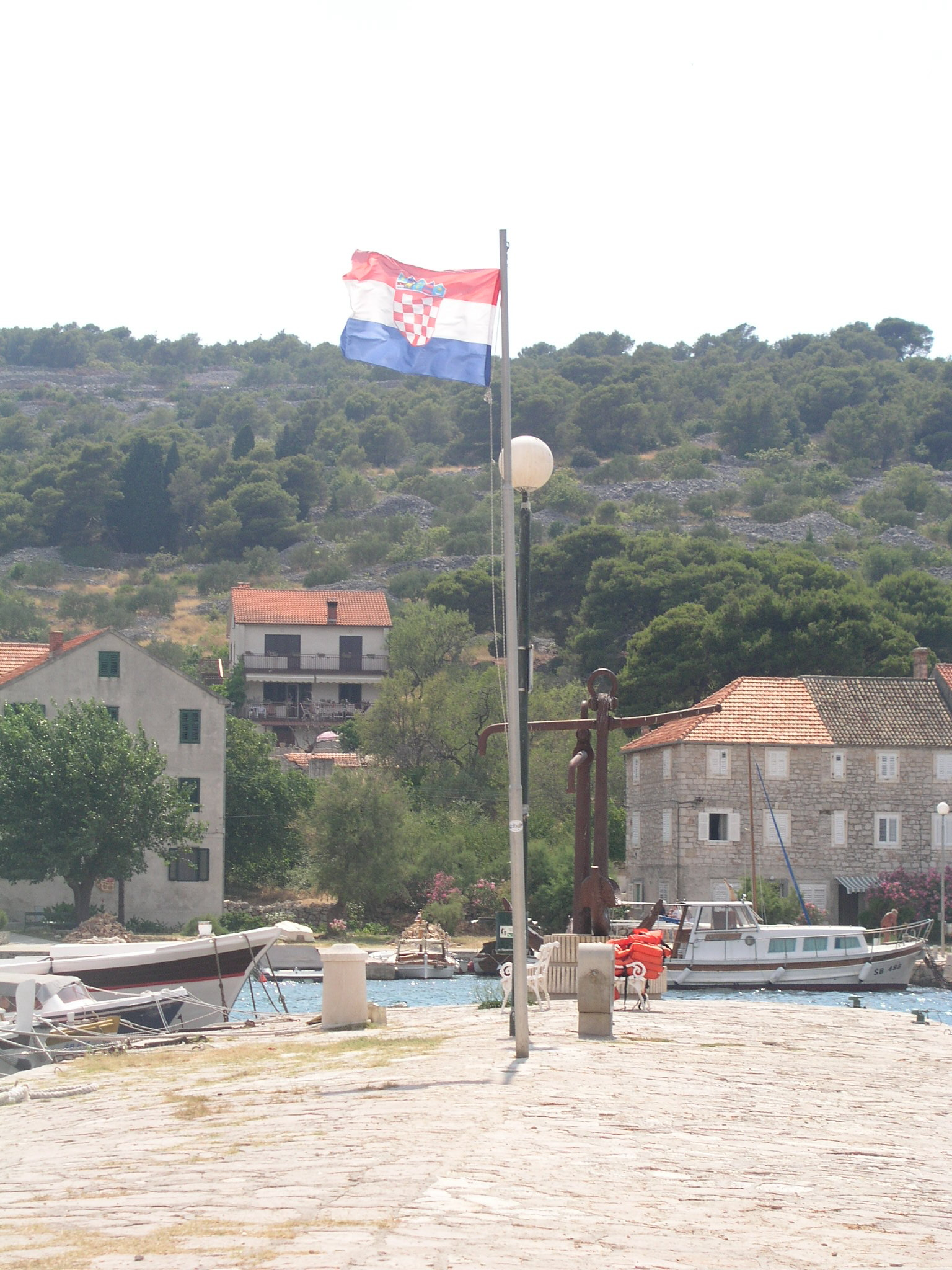
Zlarin's Sailors monument

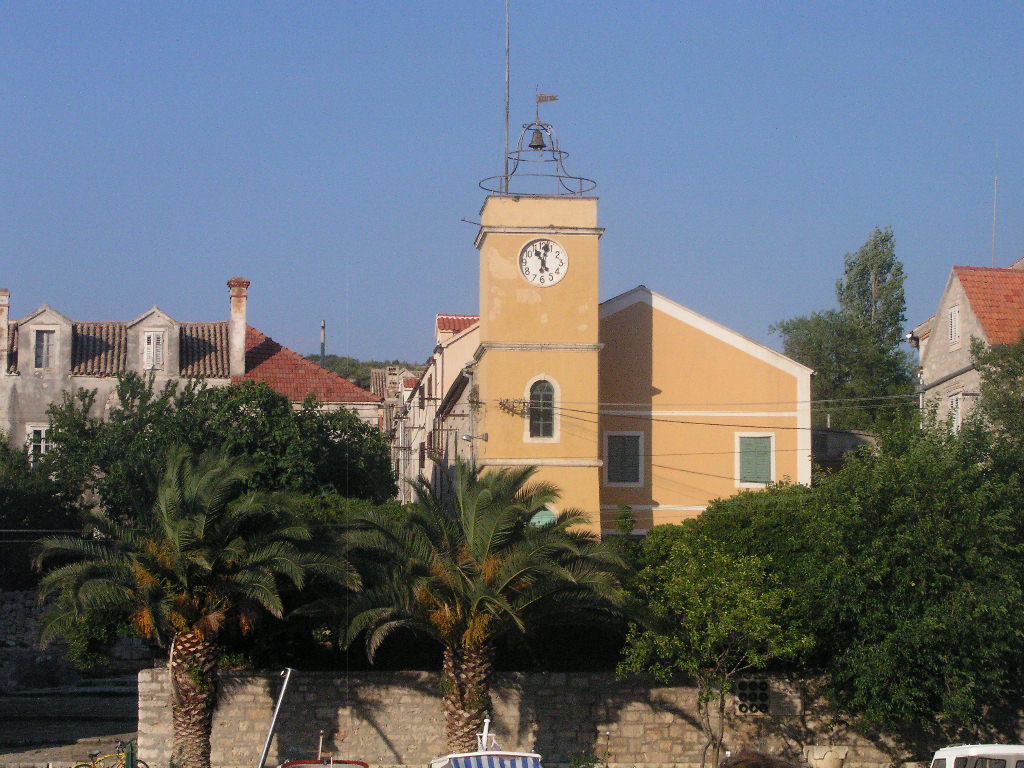
The Leroj

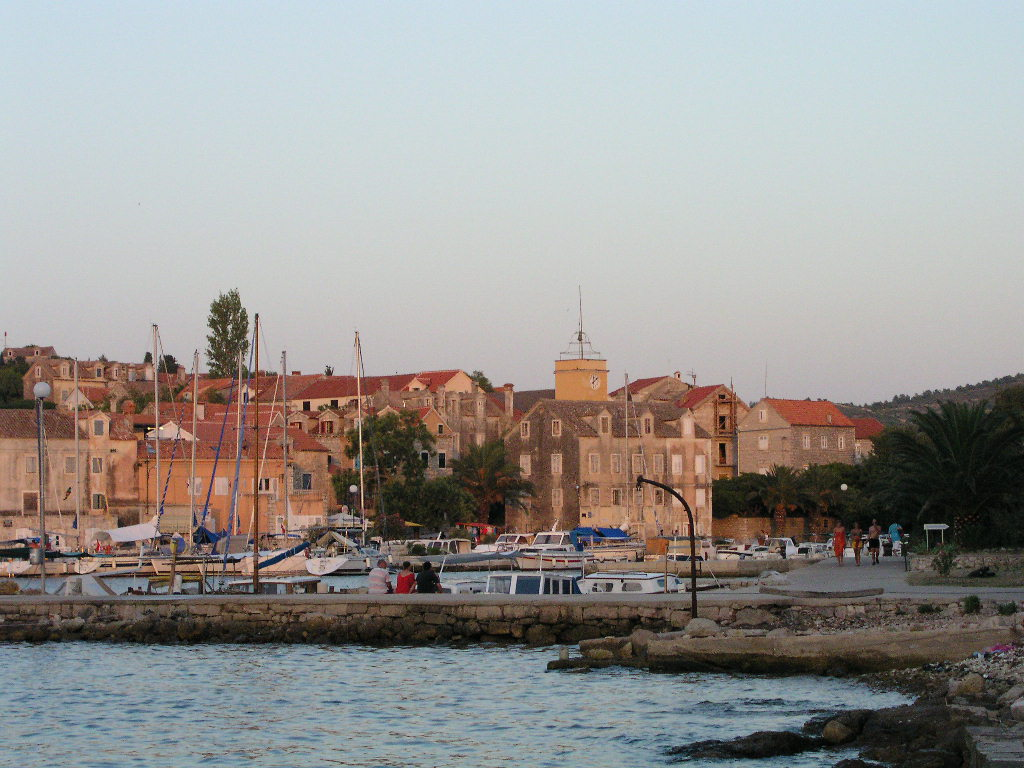

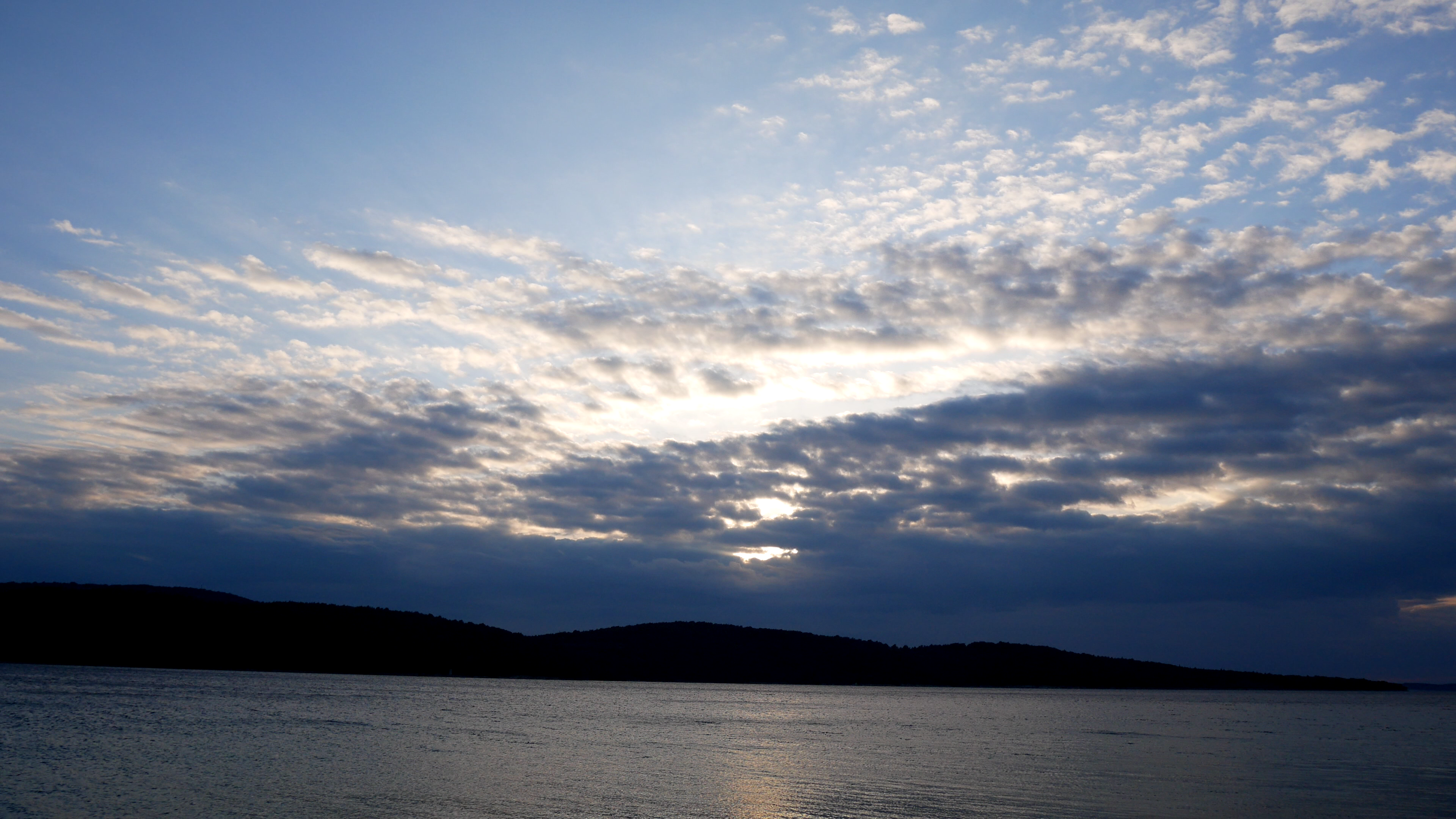
Beautiful view of Zlarin from Zablaće

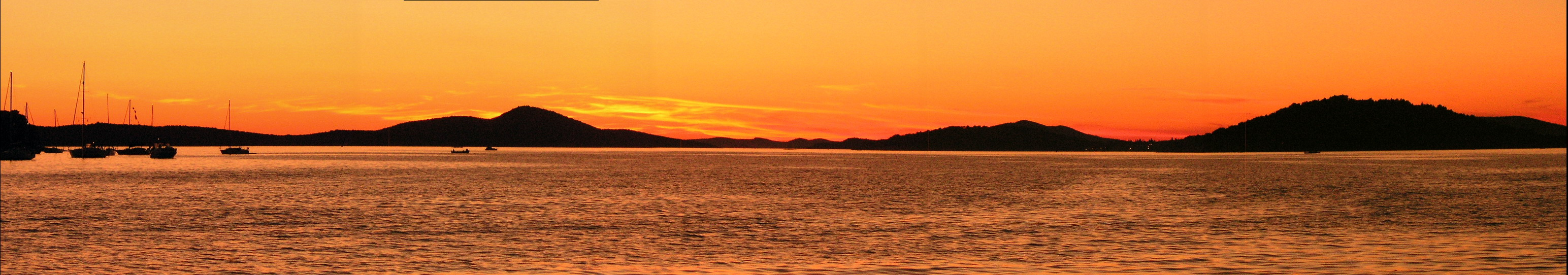
Zlarin fiery sunset taken from pier

Same pier by day
