= Tactical light =

Flashlight used in conjunction with a firearm

A tactical light mounted to the bottom rail of a rifle

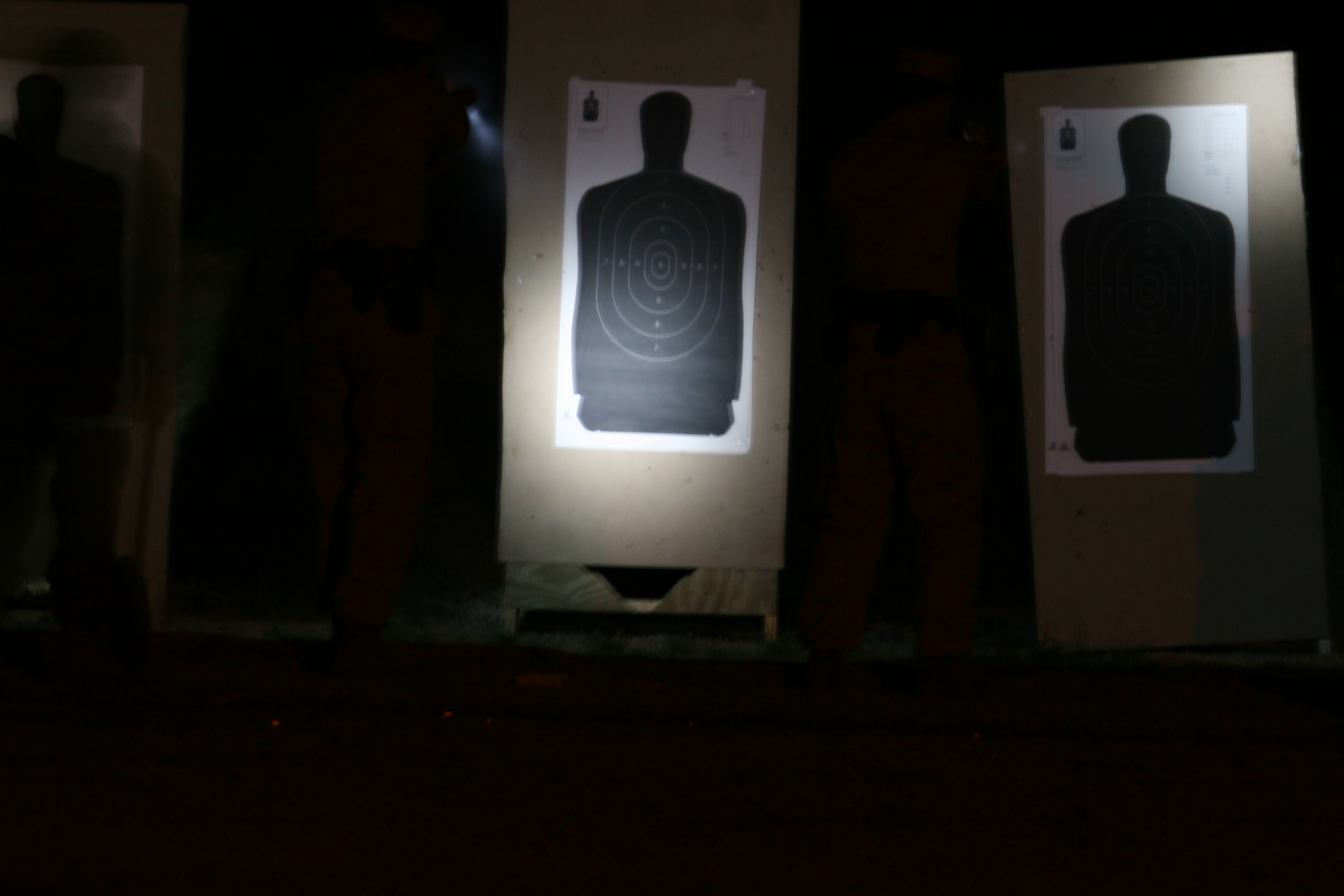
Tactical light and a target in a low-light environment

A tactical light or weapon light is a flashlight used in conjunction with a firearm to aid low-light target identification, allowing the user to simultaneously aim a weapon and illuminate the target. Tactical lights can be handheld or mounted to the weapon with the light beam parallel to the bore. Tactical lights can also serve as a non-lethal weapon, used to temporarily blind and disorient targets or, in the case of a large handheld flashlight, to be used as a blunt weapon.

Features particularly associated with tactical lights include shock resistance, reliability, lightweight construction and powerful, long-lasting batteries, and high light intensity. Tactical lights may have optional filters to produce colored light, to not attract bugs, or may emit only infrared radiation for use with night vision equipment. A laser sight may also be added to a weapon-mounted tactical light.

== Handheld lights ==
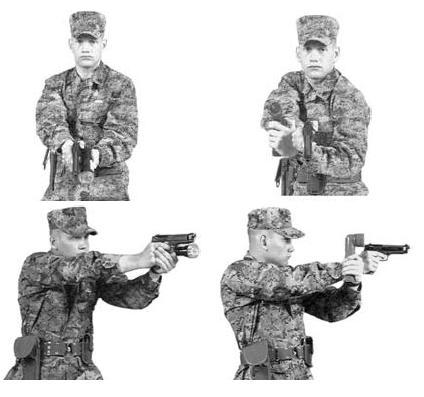
Alert (top) and Ready (bottom) positions of two different flashlight holds for use with handguns, from MCRP 3-01B section 10

Handheld lights are generally restricted to use with handguns, as long guns such as rifles and shotguns require two hands to operate. While just about any handheld flashlight can serve in the role of tactical light with the proper technique, some features are more readily adapted to the role. Because the flashlight needs to be reliable and rugged, specialized, more expensive tactical flashlights are generally used by law enforcement officers and soldiers, rather than inexpensive consumer-grade units. Some manufacturers sell lights specifically designed for use as handheld tactical lights. Police training programs in shooting while holding a flashlight date back to at least the 1930s.

To use a handheld light as a tactical light, the handgun is held in one hand, and the light in the other. There are a variety of positions that can be used to allow the light and handgun to be held parallel and provide mutual support, or the light can be held off to the side of the body to present a false target to a potential assailant. Since the weapon and light are not attached to each other, the light may be used to illuminate areas that may or may not contain a target, without pointing the weapon at the area. If a target is detected, the handgun can quickly be brought into line to cover the target.

A flashlight intended to be used in this way will have provisions for ease of use when used with a handgun. Some models will have a narrow body and a ring designed to fit through the fingers, allowing the light to be used in a tight two handed grip on a handgun, with the switch controlled by pulling back with the fingers on the ring. More traditional models can be used as well. Some flashlights feature a momentary on switch so that the light is quickly turned off by releasing finger pressure on the button. Another useful feature is the ability to attach a lanyard to the light, allowing the light to be secured to the hand holding it; this allows the light to be dropped if the hand is needed (for a magazine change, for example) and quickly retrieved.

Police often use large flashlights like the classic D cell Maglite, a sturdy metal unit which, when held correctly, can double as a billy club and as a tactical light. The flashlight is held in the weak hand, with the back of the flashlight extending past the thumb. This allows the light to quickly be reversed, swinging the back end of the light forward to strike the target or block a blow. The strong hand can then be used to draw a sidearm, and place the hands back to back to provide support and illumination in the firing position. Smaller tactical flashlights often have crown-like protrusions around the lens to enable its use as a weapon by hammerfist strike.

== Weapon-mounted lights ==
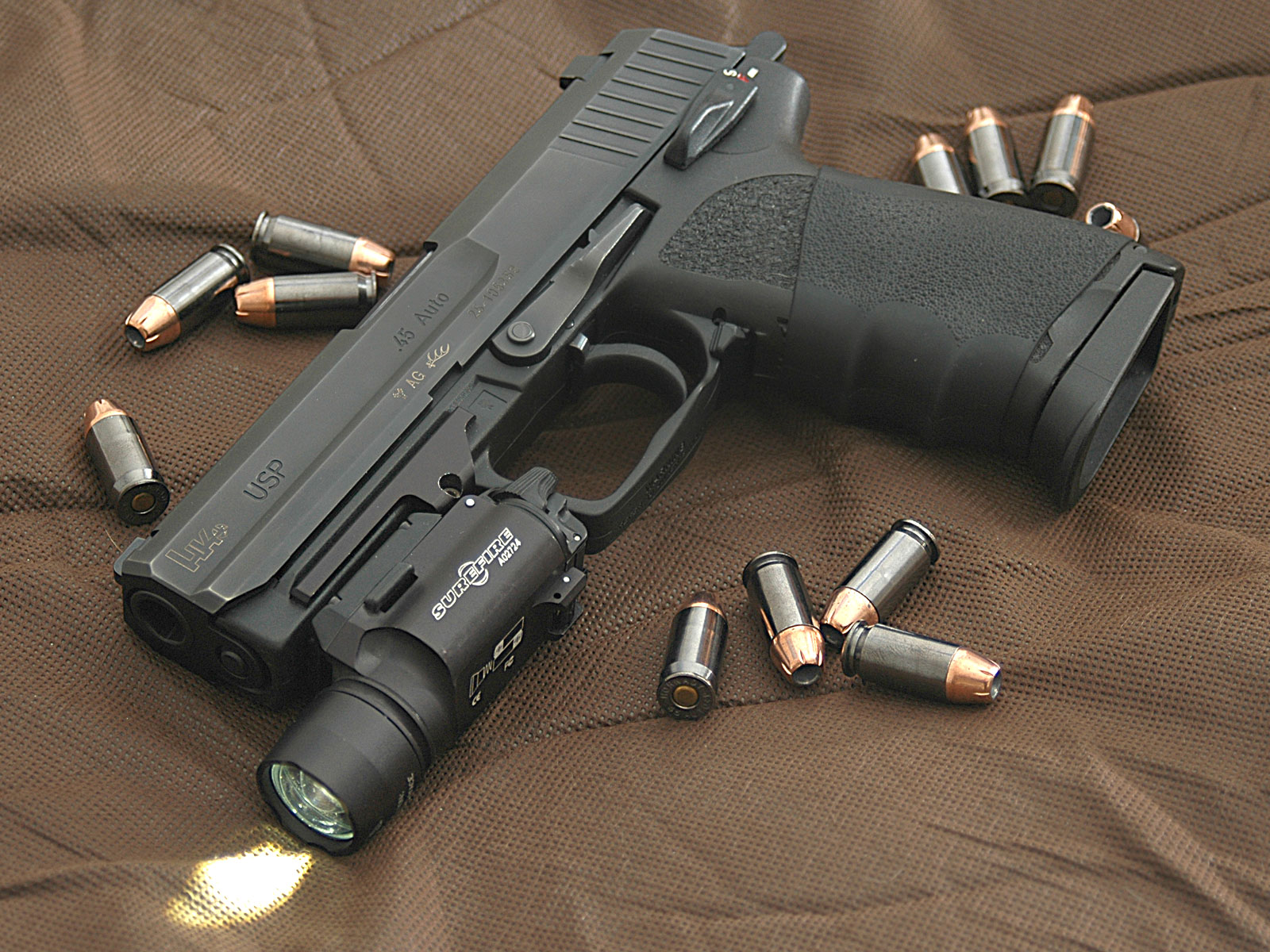
A Heckler & Koch USP with a SureFire flashlight mounted below its barrel

Hand-held flashlights were introduced about 1900 with availability of dry cell batteries and incandescent light bulbs. Early bulbs were often too fragile to survive the acceleration of firearm recoil. A United States patent was issued in 1912 for a night sight for firearms demonstrated on a revolver with a bulb mounted in a shock absorber below the barrel and the grip modified to hold a battery and include a pressure switch.

Weapon-mounted lights (sometimes called "weapon lights") offer hands-free use, leaving the operator free to use both hands to control the weapon. For rifles, two hands are needed to use the weapon. Most models have an on/off switch mounted on a short wire. The switch is then mounted somewhere on the gun within easy reach of the firer's fingers. Weapon-mounted lights are most commonly seen on rifles, shotguns, and submachine guns, but small tactical lights are becoming more common on handguns as well. These lights are often much more expensive than the handheld lights, since they must be sufficiently robust to withstand the recoil of the firearm, and the dedicated mounting hardware also adds to the price. One downside of the weapon-mounted light is that it is always aimed parallel to the bore, so illuminating an object means that it is also targeted. Because of this, weapon-mounted lights may not be appropriate under some rules of engagement.

Weapon-mounted lights used to be specific to particular models of firearm, and to some extent that is still true; for example, SureFire makes dedicated lights that replace the forends of the Mossberg 500 and Benelli M3 shotguns, the Heckler & Koch MP5 submachine gun, and the M4 carbine. On the other hand, many modern firearms are incorporating rail integration systems, allowing any appropriately-sized rail-compatible tactical light to be attached. Other mounting systems are simple clamps, designed to mount most cylindrical lights parallel to the barrel of most firearms. Using an infrared light in conjunction with night vision goggles can mitigate concern about revealing the user, so long as the target lacks night vision. Also partially mitigating this risk associated with a visible light tactical light is the ability of the tactical light user to temporarily disrupt the night vision of the target.

=== Standard form factor and light bearing holsters ===
On most handgun holsters, the firearm is held in the holster via the trigger guard, either via a locking mechanism or simply by the holster being a bit tight in that area and holds or clicks the firearm in place. On handguns with lights, however, it is often not possible to make a holster that retain the firearm by the trigger guard, and most such holsters therefore retain the firearm firmly via the light. As such, ready-to-use light bearing holsters not only have to be made for a specific handgun model, but also a specific light, or at least for a light which shares the same or roughly the same form factor. One example of this is the SureFire 300 and 400 model series, which have retained the same form factor despite receiving numerous modifications over time. Pistol lights sharing the same form factor gives the possibility to upgrade lights to newer models and continue to use old holsters, as well as giving better aftermarket support for holsters. Some holsters can safely accommodate different types of lights.

== Lighting features ==
Since tactical lights are intended for use in situations where lethal force is likely to be used, reliability is important.

=== Battery ===
Primary lithium batteries are commonly used with tactical lights, due to the long shelf life, high specific energy, and gradual voltage decay over the battery's lifetime. Alkaline batteries also provide moderately long shelf life and low initial cost. In powerful lights with high current draw, the high internal resistance of alkaline cells results in decreased effective capacity. As the rate of discharge increases, a greater proportion of the cells' power is wasted in its internal resistance. Because of their low internal resistance, lithium batteries are often the primary cell of choice when a high rate of discharge relative to nominal capacity is required. Lithium cells will also provide better performance in cold weather than alkaline cells. High-quality lithium cells are less prone to leakage of electrolyte than alkalines.

Rechargeable batteries, such as NiMH and Nicad, are economical options for lights with heavy usage. Rapid capacity loss in comparison to alkaline and lithium batteries limits the use of rechargeable cells to lights in frequent use. With a lithium-ion battery or a low self-discharge NiMH battery, rechargeable battery shelf life is extended. Several new models of tactical flashlights incorporate the ability to be recharged from a USB cable.

=== Bulb ===
Bulbs are chosen based on the desired light output and battery life. Generally, high performance bulbs are used, such as xenon bulbs or high power LED lights. LEDs provide maximum battery life due to their energy efficiency, and 2000s technology has greatly increased the light output of LEDs. At one time, xenon bulbs offered the brightest light levels, but recent high-power LEDs are brighter and more efficient than comparable xenon-filled incandescent lamps. Most importantly, LED bulbs are not subject to filament breakage due to the shot recoil of a firearm. Recent advances in high-lux, high-efficiency white LEDs have led to a wave of brighter and more energy-efficient tactical lights.

=== Illumination types ===
Tactical lights can be fitted with lenses to produce certain colors, Colored lights or filters provide flexibility for different purposes. Red lights are best for preserving night vision for the law enforcement officer, due to their minimal impact on the rod cells in the eye, while blue light provides high contrast for detecting blood. Light in the infrared spectrum is only visible through night vision devices, allowing the operator to see clearly while reducing the visibility to those not equipped with night vision equipment. Tactical lights are sometimes combined with a laser to form a multifunction unit, able to provide low-light targeting, illumination, or both.

== See also ==
- Battery (electricity)
- Incandescent light bulb
- Kel-Lite
- Spotlighting
- Visual perception
