= AceBeam =

Chinese flashlight manufacturer

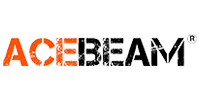
- Industry: Lighting
- Founded: 2014; 12 years ago
- Founder: Michael Song
- Headquarters: Shenzhen, China
- Website: acebeam.com

AceBeam, stylized as ACEBEAM, is a Chinese LED flashlight manufacturer based in Shenzhen.

== History ==
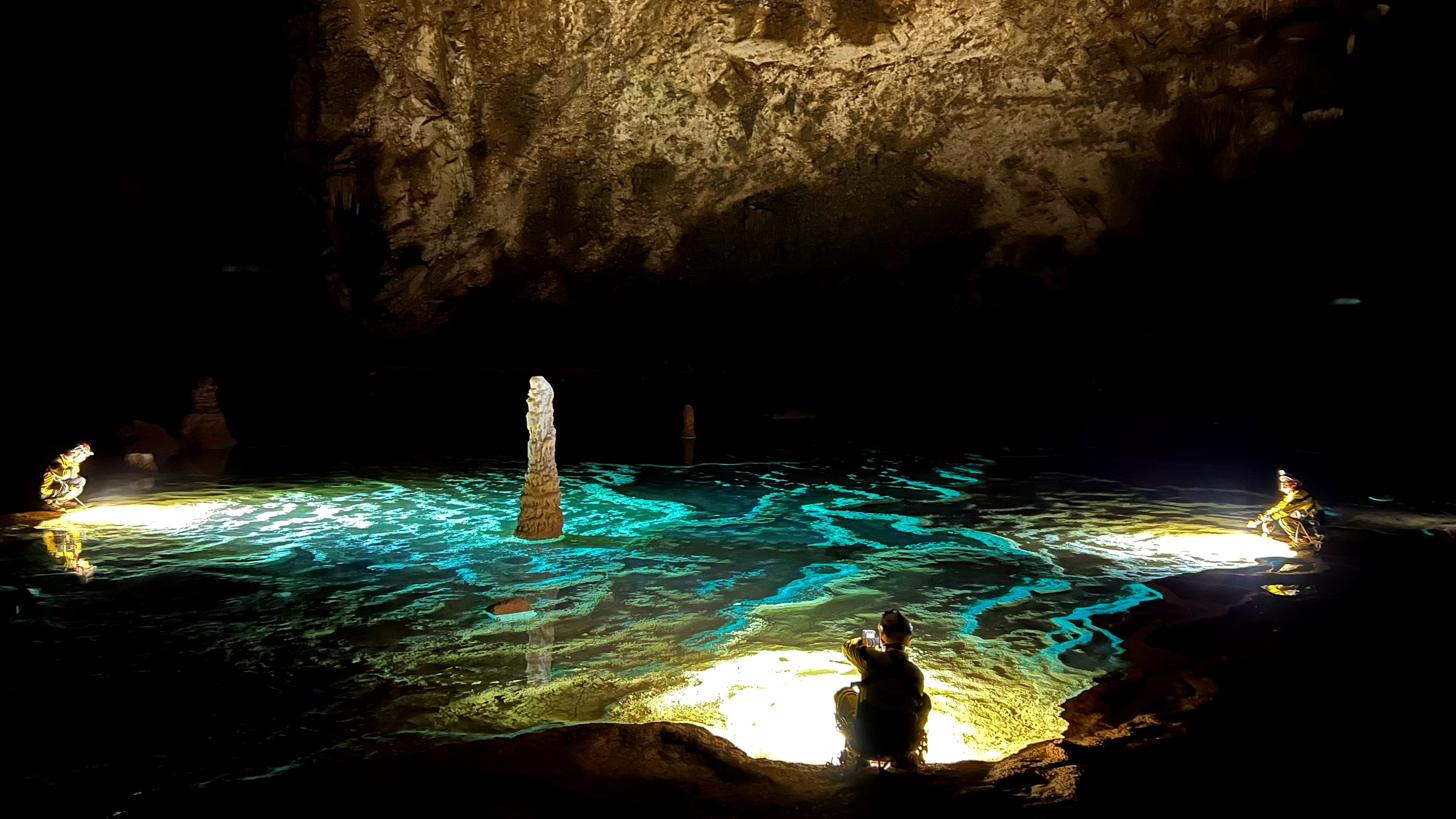
A cave illuminated by AceBeam flashlights

AceBeam was founded in 2014 in Shenzhen by Michael Song.

Over the years, AceBeam has introduced long-distance tactical flashlights, headlamps, everyday carry lights, white laser lights, searchlights, emergency battery-charging flashlights, high-lumen flashlights, and camping lights. One notable development was the H50 headlamp, which was used by the China Expedition Team during their 2022 exploration of Yulong Cave in Fengdu, Chongqing, an event documented by the Geography China Program on China Central Television's Channel 10.

In 2024, AceBeam launched the TAC 2AA, a pocket-sized flashlight, which was reviewed by GearJunkie in 2025 and described as having "an incredible amount of capability."

In 2025, Acebeam's X25 power bank flashlight, which is used during hurricanes, received an ISPO Award.
