= Anthony Maglica =

Croatian-American entrepreneur (born 1930)

- Born: Anthony Maglica; November 1930 (age 95); New York City, US
- Other name: Tony Maglica
- Occupations: Businessman, machinist
- Years active: 1974–present
- Organization(s): Mag Instrument, Inc.
- Known for: Maglite flashlights

Anthony "Tony" Maglica (Croatian: Ante Maglica) (born November 1930) is the owner and founder of Mag Instrument Inc, the company that manufactures the Maglite flashlight which was designed by Maglica. The Maglite is a powerful and durable flashlight and for many years was the standard issued gear used by police officers in the USA.

== Early life ==
Although born in New York City, Maglica grew up on the island of Zlarin, which is off the coast of Croatia. During the Great Depression, his family returned to their homeland. World War II ravaged Croatia, and in 1950 he returned to the United States, settling in Ontario, California. Speaking little English, he obtained work as a machinist. While working there, he learned that one of his bosses operated a side business machining hydraulic parts. Maglica learned of a metal lathe for sale for $1000 and convinced the seller to accept a $125 deposit, most of his money at the time, with the remainder being paid off with monthly payments.

That business grew into his own machine shop which he incorporated in 1974 called Mag Instrument Inc.

== Family Affairs ==
In 1992 there was a shakeup at the company when Claire discovered that Tony had been arranging to leave the company to his children from a previous marriage upon his death. This started a bitter family battle that would last over a decade and result in Claire and her sons leaving the company, Claire filing a palimony lawsuit against Tony for $200 million, and Claire's sons starting their own flashlight company in 1997.

=== Palimony lawsuit ===
In 1992, after learning of Maglica's business plans, their relationship ended and Claire filed a palimony suit for, among other things, breach of contract, breach of partnership agreement, fraud, breach of fiduciary duty and quantum meruit in Orange County Superior Court seeking $200 million in damages. The lawsuit went to jury trial, covered by Court TV to large and involved audiences, awarded Claire $84 million in the Spring of 1994.

The judgment was appealed to the California Courts of Appeal where, in 1998, was reversed and remanded. The court stated that the award was incorrect because the damages should have been the value of her services, not the amount of the benefit of her services. After being remanded and requiring a new trial, Claire settled with Mag Instrument Inc in 2000 for $29 million.

=== Bison Sportslights, Inc. ===
Bison Sportslights, Inc. were found liable for willful and malicious misappropriation of trade secrets, malicious breach of confidence, malicious false advertising, and malicious unfair competition. Bison had a permanent injunction entered against it and Mag Instrument, Inc. was awarded $1.2 million for damages and attorney's fees.

Bison Sportslights, Inc. is no longer in business.
