= Streamlight =

American flashlight manufacturer

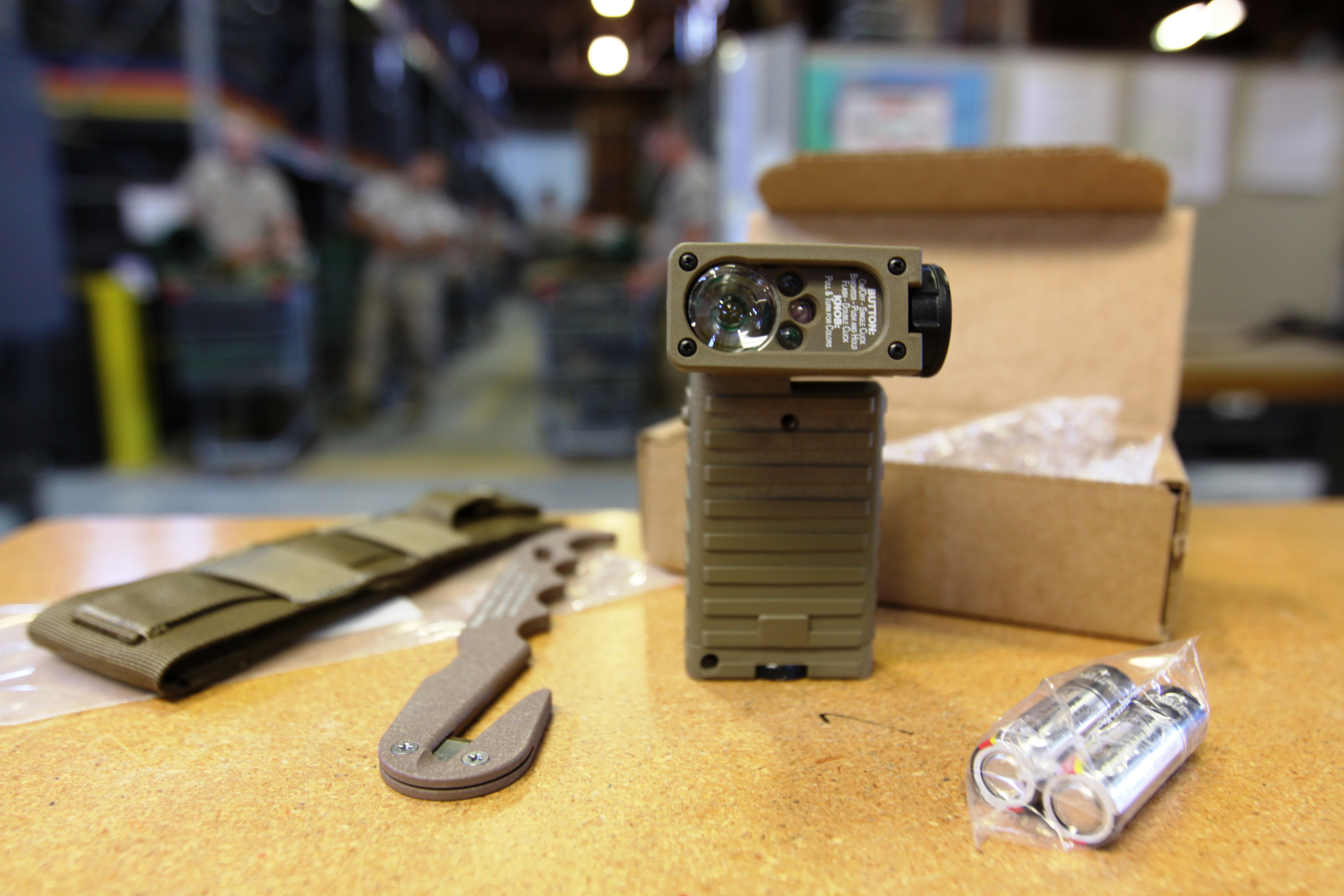
- Streamlight Sidewinder flashlight
- Founded: 1973; 53 years ago
- Headquarters: Eagleville, Pennsylvania, United States
- Website: www.streamlight.com

Streamlight is a company located in Eagleville, Pennsylvania, United States, that manufactures flashlights powered by various-sized rechargeable and disposable batteries.

Their product line features hand-held and weapon-mountable lights as well as a right angle light used by firefighters on their turnout gear. Several of their products utilize dual sources, combining the long life of LED lamps with more powerful but shorter-lived conventional incandescent lamps. They also produce a series of Laser Illuminators such as the one of their newest models, the TLR-8, which is a combination LED weapon light and laser.

In the early 1970s, NASA tasked a team of engineers from Fairfield, New Jersey with realizing a solar simulator to simulate sunlight outside the filtration of the atmosphere. Streamlight used the team's research to develop a handheld halogen-lit 1 million candlepower (981,000 candela) searchlight, creating a beam extending past a mile, as a commercial spin-off of technology developed by Johnson Space Center for NASA as part of the Apollo program. It was marketed to military and law enforcement.

After the handheld design was finalised, the company was moved to King of Prussia, Pennsylvania by a private investor. In 1977, the headquarters was moved to Norristown, Pennsylvania. In 2001, the company moved to Eagleville, Pennsylvania.

In a Popular Mechanics article, "The 7 Best Handheld Spotlights for Outdoor and Emergency Use", Streamlight spotlights ranked among the list multiple times.

== See also ==
- Flashlight
- Tactical light
