= Baton (law enforcement) =

Club of less than arm's length

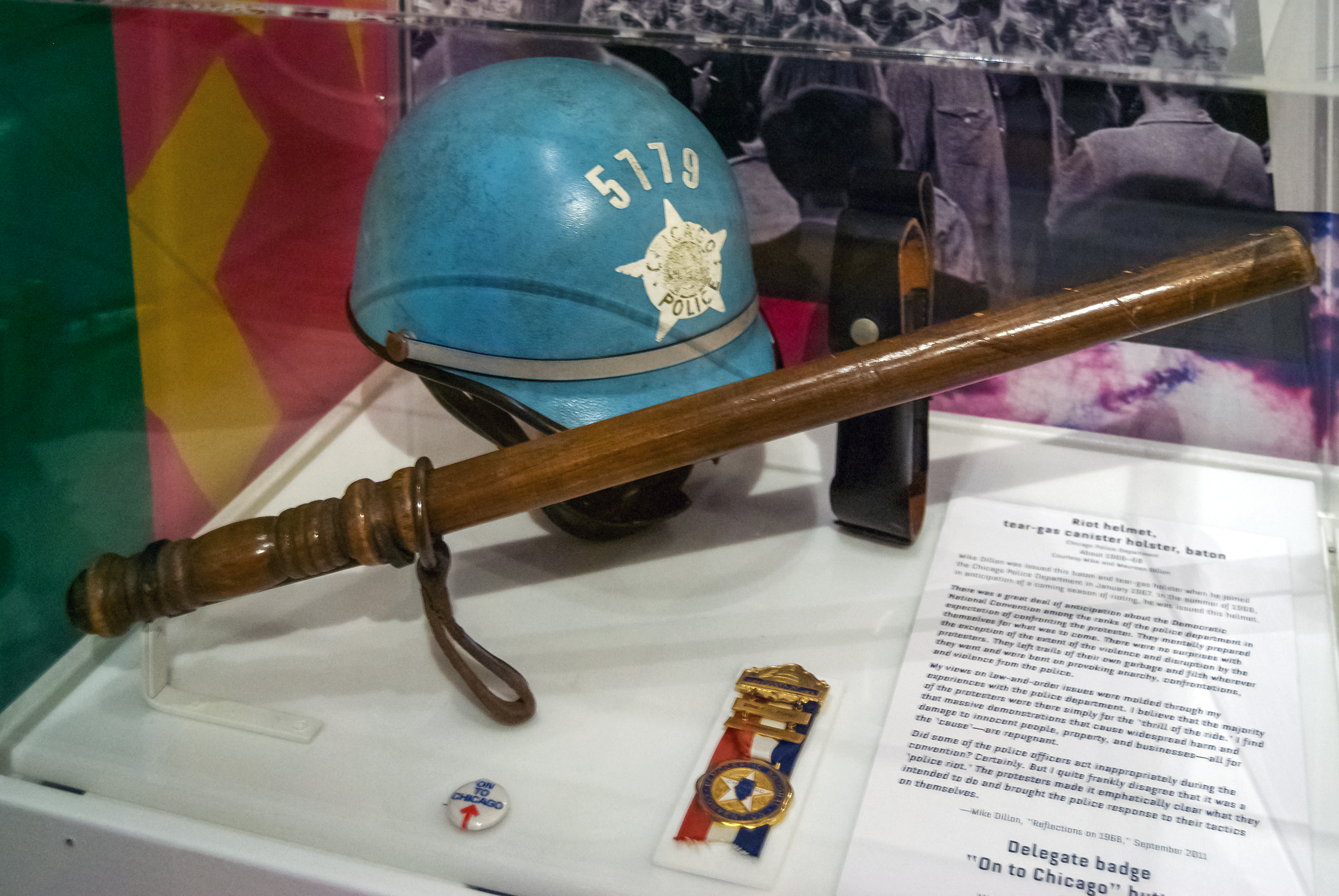
A 1968-era Chicago Police helmet and billy club

A baton (also truncheon, nightstick, billy club, billystick, cosh, lathi, or simply stick) is a roughly cylindrical club made of wood, rubber, plastic, or metal. It is carried as a compliance tool and defensive weapon by law-enforcement officers, correctional staff, security guards and military personnel. The name baton comes from the French bâton (stick), derived from Old French Baston, from Latin bastum.

As a weapon a baton may be used defensively (to block) or offensively (to strike, jab, or bludgeon), and it can aid in the application of armlocks. The usual striking or bludgeoning action is not produced by a simple and direct hit, as with an ordinary blunt object, but rather by bringing the arm down sharply while allowing the truncheon to pivot nearly freely forward and downward, so moving its tip much faster than its handle. Batons are also used for non-weapon purposes such as breaking windows to free individuals trapped in a vehicle, or turning out a suspect's pockets during a search (as a precaution against sharp objects).

Some people other than law enforcement officers use batons as weapons because of their simple construction and easy concealment. The use or carrying of batons or improvised clubs by people other than law enforcement officers is restricted by law in many countries, by reason that baton strikes against vulnerable parts of the body can have the capacity to inflict lethal injuries.

== History ==
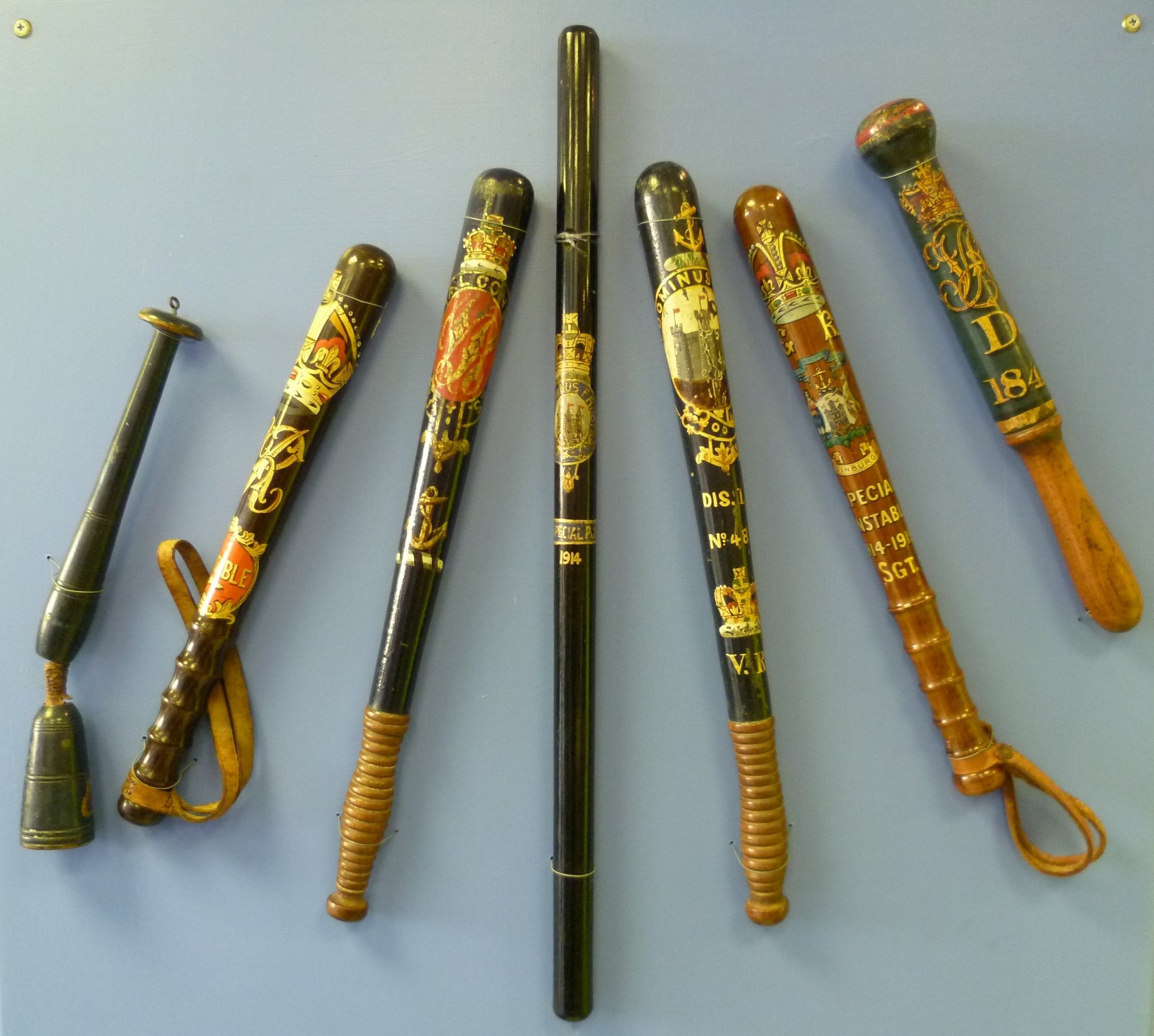
Early-20th-century police truncheons in the Edinburgh Police Centre Museum

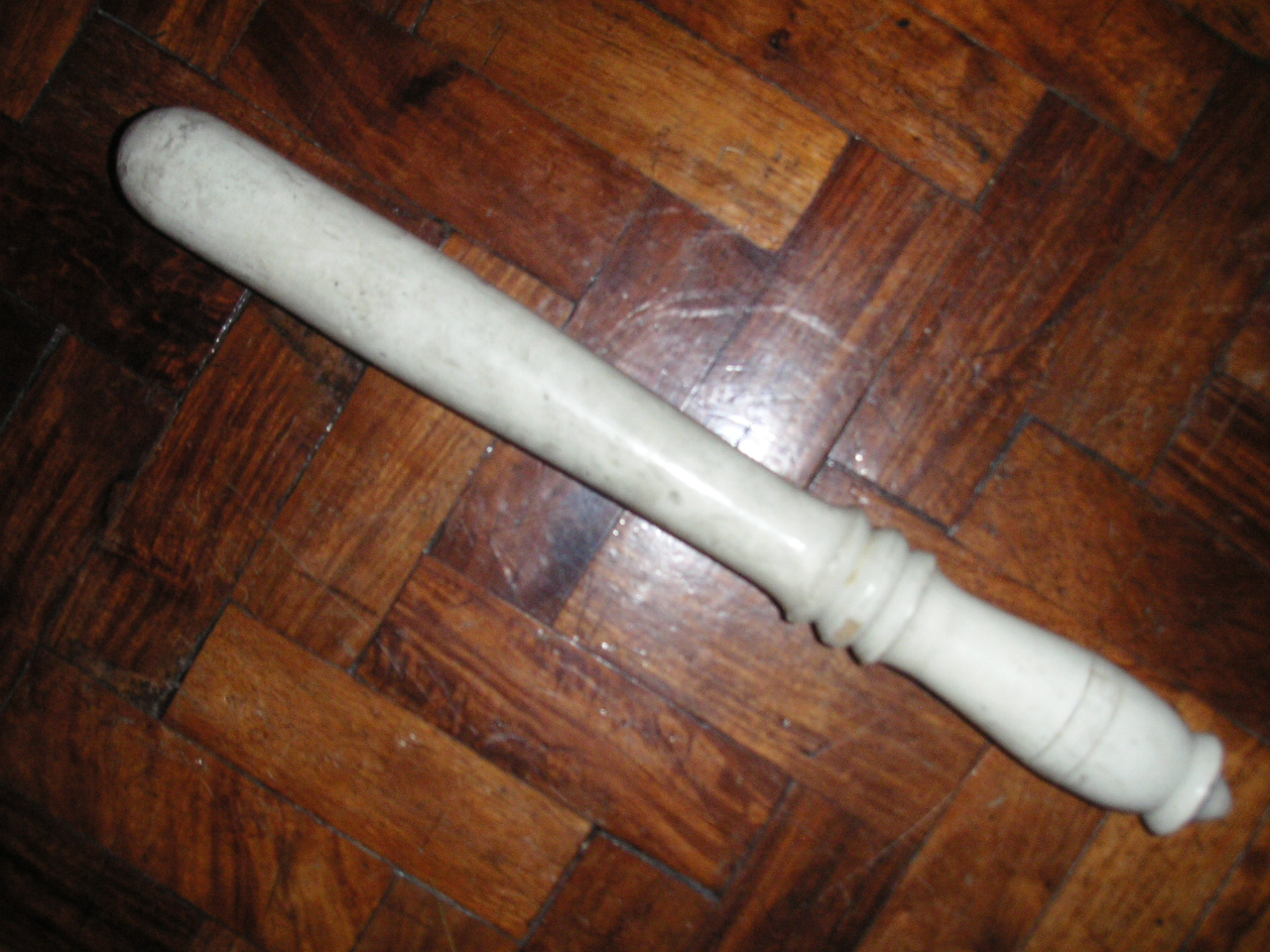
A modern wooden baton

In the Victorian era, police in London carried truncheons about one foot long called billy clubs. According to the Online Etymology Dictionary, this name was first recorded in 1848 as slang for a burglars' crowbar. The meaning "policeman's club" is first recorded 1856. The truncheon acted as the policeman's 'Warrant Card' as the Royal Crest attached to it indicated the policeman's authority. This was always removed when the equipment left official service (often with the person who used it).

The Victorian original has since developed into the multitude of varieties available today. The typical truncheon is a straight stick made from wood or a synthetic material, approximately 32 mm (1 1/4 in) in diameter and 460–910 mm (18–36 in) long, with a fluted handle to aid in gripping. Truncheons are often ornamented with their organizations' coats of arms. Longer truncheons are called "riot batons" because of their use in riot control. Truncheons may have developed as a marriage between the club or military mace and the staff of office/sceptre.

Straight batons of rubber have a softer impact. Some of the kinetic energy bends and compresses the rubber and bounces off when the object is struck. Rubber batons are not very effective when used on the subject's arms or legs, and can still cause injury if the head is struck. That is why most police departments have stopped issuing them. The Russian police standard-issue baton is rubber, except in places such as Siberia, where it can be cold enough that the rubber may become brittle and break if struck. The traffic baton is red to make it more visible as a signaling aid in directing traffic. In Russia, traffic batons are striped in black and white for the same reason, and in Sweden they are white. Until the mid-1990s, British police officers carried traditional wooden truncheons of a sort that had changed little from Victorian times. Since the late 1990s, the collapsible baton is issued except for public order duties, where a fixed, acrylic baton is used. Side-handled batons were issued for a while, but fell out of favour.

The New York City Police Department used to use two kinds of batons depending on the time. The one for daytime was called a day-stick and was 280 mm (11 in) in length. Another baton, that was used at night, was 660 mm (26 in) long and called a night-stick, which is the origin of the word nightstick. The night-stick was longer so it could provide extra protection which was thought to be necessary at night.

== Target areas ==
In modern police training, the primary targets are large nerve clusters, such as the common peroneal nerve in the mid-thigh and large, easily targetable muscle groups, such as the quadriceps and biceps. The baton is swung in fast, "snapping" strikes to these areas, sometimes only making contact with the tip. Taken together, these are intended to impair the subject's ability to continue advancing (by striking the leg) or attack (by striking the arm) by causing transitory neurapraxia (temporary muscle pain, spasm and paralysis due to nerve injury). Modern systems strictly prohibit hitting the skull, sternum, spine, or groin unless such an attack is conducted in defense of life, with many jurisdictions considering this deadly force.

Before the 1970s, a common use of the police baton was to strike a suspect's head with a full-force overhand motion in order to stun them or knock them unconscious by cerebral concussion, similar to the pre-baton practice of buffaloing with the handle of a revolver. However, this practice had two major liabilities. First, there was a high risk and incidence of death or permanent injury, as the difference in force between that required to concuss a suspect into non-resistance and that which would fracture their skull tends to be narrow and unpredictable. Second, there were problems with reliability, as resistance to cerebral concussion varies widely between individuals, and head strikes that did not disable the suspect were found to merely escalate the encounter. Officer Arthur Lamb, a well-known trainer on the baton, once stated:

I've trained over 200 police departments, comprising over ten thousand men. In every class, I ask the officers if they've ever seen a subject subdued with one blow to the head. None of them ever have. What you're doing when you hit a man in the head is first, creating a serious danger of death, and second, you're numbing the one part of the body that can stop him. If you use my method with one or two strikes and step back, he realizes that the thing has gone against him, and the confrontation is over. But if you hit him in the head and put him into a state of shock where he is almost immune to pain, and now enraged beyond reason, the only thing left for you to do is beat him into the ground. This is why so many police brutality charges came about when batons were used the old-fashioned way.

As a result, civil lawsuits and claims of police brutality resulted in revised training for officers.

== Designs ==
Batons in common use by police around the world include many different designs, such as fixed-length straight batons, blackjacks, fixed-length side-handle batons, collapsible straight batons, and other more exotic variations. All types have their advantages and disadvantages. The design and popularity of specific types of baton have evolved over the years and are influenced by a variety of factors. These include inherent compromises in the dual (and competing) goals of control effectiveness and safety (for both officer and subject).

=== Straightstick ===
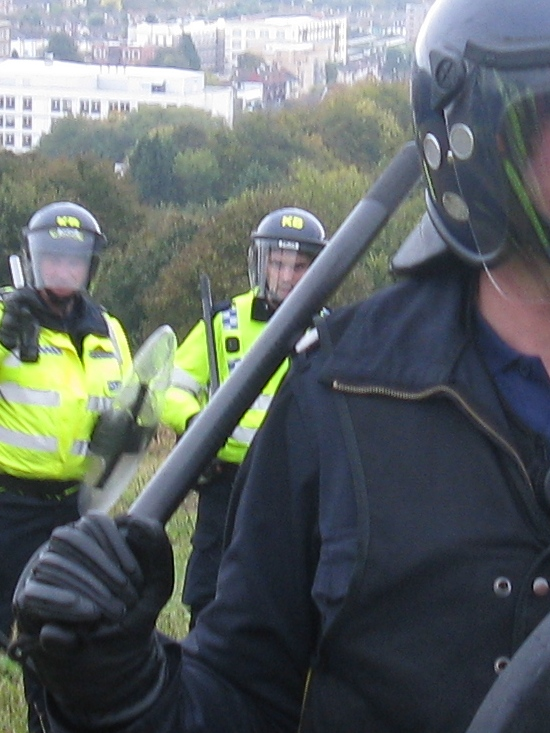
Sussex Police riot officers with straightsticks during the EDO protests in Brighton in October 2008

A straight, fixed-length baton (also commonly referred to as a "straightstick") is the oldest and simplest police baton design, known as far back as ancient Egypt. It consists of little more than a long cylinder with a molded, turned or wrapped grip, usually with a slightly thicker or tapering shaft and rounded tip. They are often made of hardwood, but in modern times are available in other materials such as aluminium, acrylic, and dense plastics and rubber. They range in size from short clubs less than 30 cm (1 ft) in length to 90-centimetre-long (3 ft) "riot batons" commonly used in civil disturbances or by officers mounted on horseback.

Straightsticks tend to be heavier and have more weight concentrated in the striking end than other designs. This makes them less maneuverable, but theoretically would deliver more kinetic energy on impact. Most agencies have replaced the straightstick with other batons because of inconvenience to carry, and a desire for their officers to look less threatening to the community they serve. Despite having been replaced by side-handle and expandable batons in many (if not most) law enforcement agencies, straightsticks remain in use by many major departments in the US, such as the Baltimore, Denver, Sacramento, Long Beach, Santa Ana, Philadelphia, San Francisco, and Riverside Police Departments. They also are used by NYPD Auxiliary Police officers, as well as many Military Police forces around the world.

=== Side-handle ===
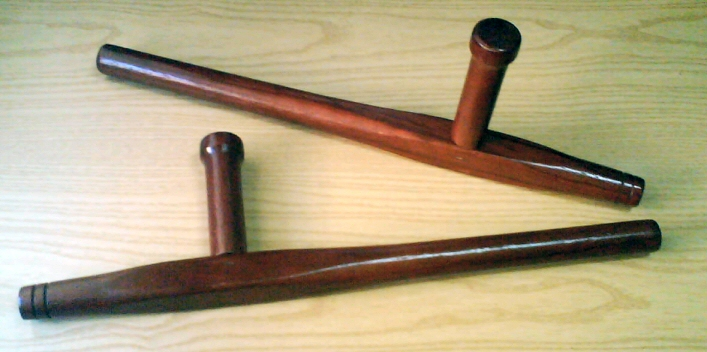
A pair of tonfa

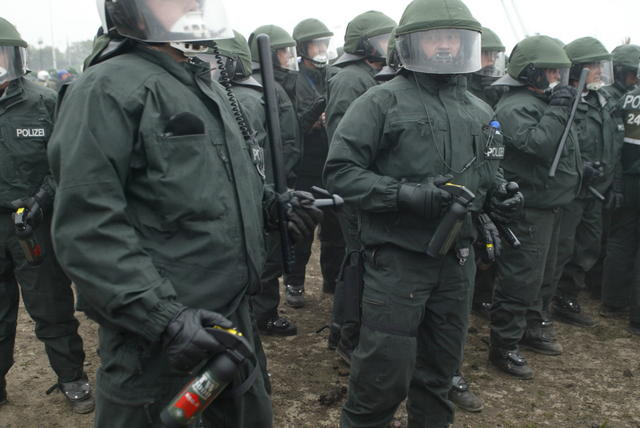
Side-handle baton used by German riot police during the protests against the 33rd G8 summit in Rostock (June 2007)

Side-handle batons (sometimes referred to as T-batons) are batons with a short side handle at a right angle to the shaft, about 150 mm (6 in) from one end. The main shaft is typically 61 cm (24 in) in length. They are derived from the tonfa, an Okinawan kobudō weapon, and are used with a similar technique (although tonfa are usually used in pairs, whereas side-handle batons are not). The best-known example is the Monadnock PR-24; "PR-24" has become a genericized trademark within the law enforcement and security communities for this type of product.

It can be held by:

- One end, and the intersection between the shaft and the handle used to catch a long swung blunt or sharp weapon.
- The side handle, and the long shaft held against the hand and forearm to splint and shield the arm against an expected blow from an attacker.

Side-handle batons are made in both fixed and collapsible models and may be constructed from a range of materials including wood, poly-carbonate, epoxy, aluminium, or a combination of materials. Some side-handle batons are one-piece design; the side-handle component and primary shaft are permanently fused together during manufacturing. One-piece designs are potentially stronger than two-piece designs, and have no risk of having a locking screw loosen from its threads. Other side-handle batons are two-piece in design (common among cheaper makes); the side-handle component is screwed into the primary shaft. The side handle may be removed from the shaft by the end-user, converting the side-handle into a straight baton.

The advantages of a side-handle baton over a straight baton are numerous:

- There is a far greater number of defensive techniques/maneuvers that may be used with the side-handle baton in contrast with the straight baton.
- The side-handle component may aid in weapon retention, making it more difficult for a suspect to take the baton away from the officer in a struggle.
- The side-handle component prevents the baton from rolling far away if inadvertently dropped, unlike a straight baton.
- Subjectively, some officers may be able to deliver a strike of greater power with the side-handle baton (when used in conjunction with a "power stroke") over a straight baton.
- Due to its design, a side handle baton is generally used in a more defensive and less offensive manner than a straight baton, and thus it is less likely for an officer to "instinctively" use a side-handle baton as a simple bludgeon and direct indiscriminate strikes against a suspect. Also, the typically defensive stance the side-handle baton is used with is generally believed to present a more community-friendly image than a straight baton.

Side-handle batons have a few disadvantages:

- More training is required for an officer to fully utilize the potential of a side-handle baton compared to a straight baton. Its use is not as instinctive as the straight batons.
- The side-handle slightly increases overall weight and bulk of the baton compared to a straight baton of identical length.
- When the side-handle baton is used as a simple bludgeon (without gripping the side-handle), it is less effective than a straight baton. Also, if an officer uses it incorrectly and strikes the subject with the end of the side handle while holding the baton from the other end it can cause serious injury (especially if the end of the handle is a large ball).

Side-handle batons have been involved in high-profile incidents of alleged police brutality, such as in New Zealand's 1981 Springbok Tour and the Rodney King beating.

==== Rapid Rotation Baton ====
The rapid rotation baton is a version of the side-handle baton released in the mid-1990s. It tries to address some of the disadvantages of straight, side and expandable batons and combine them with the strengths of the aforementioned. The design is fixed length, with a narrow shaft closer to the diameter of common expandable batons, as well as small projections on both sides of the baton above the grip, making it somewhat resemble a large Japanese sai.

=== Expandable ===
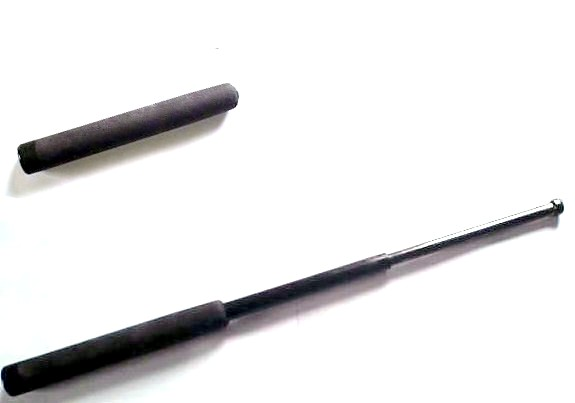
ASP 53 cm (21 in) expandable baton in expanded and collapsed state

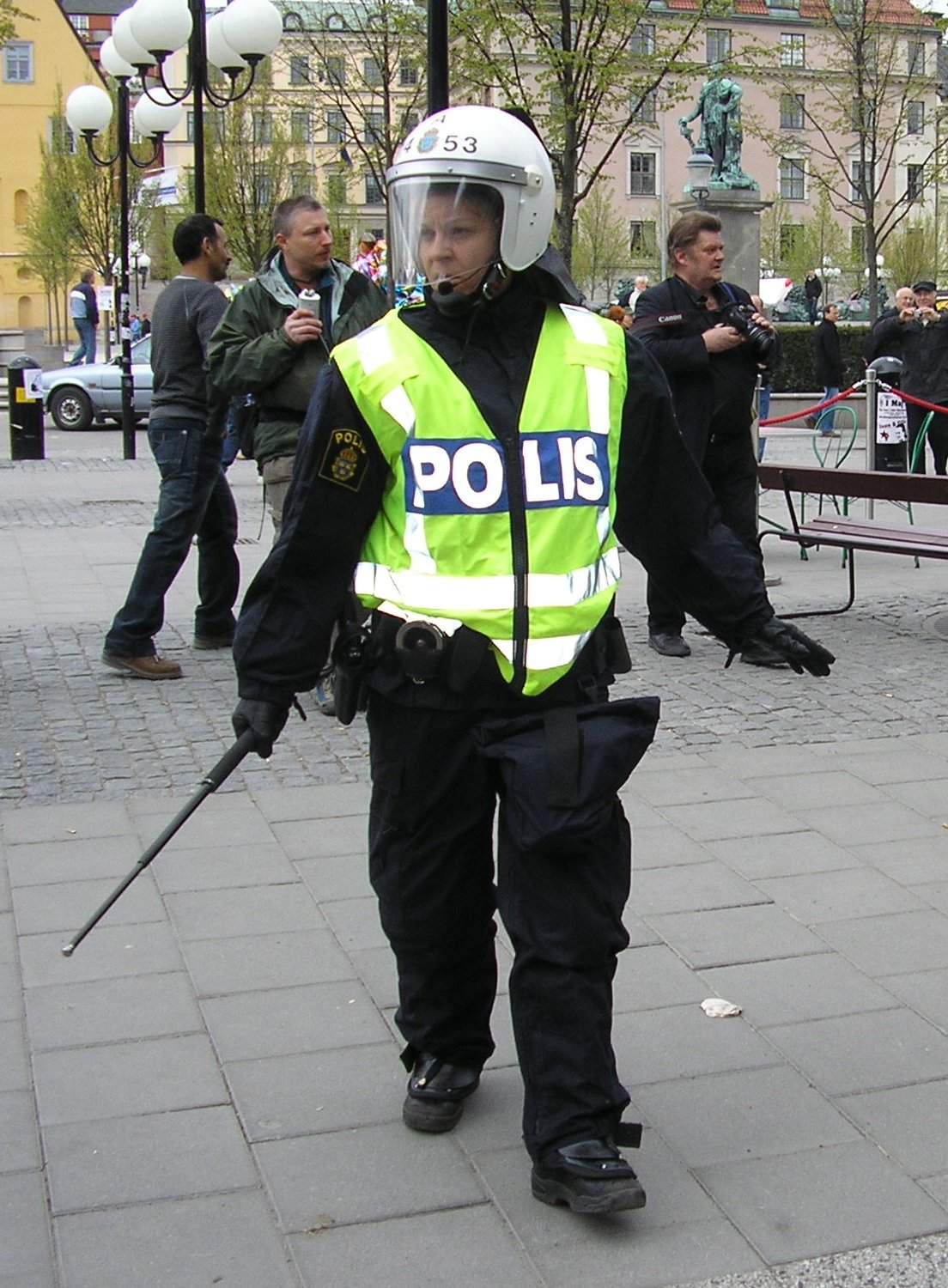
Swedish riot police with expandable baton

An expandable baton (also referred to variously as a collapsible baton, telescopic baton, tactical baton, spring cosh, ASP, or extendable) is typically composed of a cylindrical outer shaft containing telescoping inner shafts (typically 2 or 3, depending on the design) that lock into each other when expanded. The shafts are usually made of steel, but lightweight baton models may have their shafts made from other materials such as aluminum alloy.

Expandable batons may have a solid tip at the outer end of the innermost shaft; the purpose of the solid tip is to maximize the power of a strike when the baton is used as an impact weapon. Expandable batons are made in both straight and side-handle configurations but are considerably more common in the straight configuration.

Depending on the holster or scabbard design, it may be possible to carry an expandable baton in either collapsed or expanded position, which would be helpful if an officer needed to holster an expanded baton and it was not possible or convenient to collapse it at the time. An expandable baton is opened by being swung forcefully while collapsed, using inertia to extend and lock the segments by friction. Some mechanical-lock versions can also be opened by simply pulling the segments apart. Depending on the design, expandable batons may be collapsed either by being brought down (inverted) on a hard surface or by depressing a button lock and manually collapsing the shafts. Additionally, the baton, in the collapsed configuration, may be used as a control device against non-compliant subjects in conjunction with pain-compliance control techniques, such as to remove a driver refusing to exit his or her vehicle. It can be used as a large kubotan.

The expandable baton is provided to most officers in the British police forces, the idea being that should violence suddenly escalate, the baton can be easily deployed but can be stowed neatly away so as not to affect movement due to its mounting point on the officer's clothing. It is also commonly used in the UK and many other countries as a means of gaining entry quickly to a vehicle that contains offenders. In such a situation the baton is deployed and, due to the solid end of the device, is used to strike windows and/or windscreens of the vehicle to either gain entry or to stop the driver from seeing where they are going in circumstances where the officer has hit the screen while the vehicle is still in motion.

==== Advantages ====
The advantages of a collapsible baton over a fixed baton are numerous:

- The collapsible shaft makes it easier for the officer to carry it and to sit in a car seat wearing it since when collapsed it is between 150 and 250 mm (6 and 10 in) long. This is contrasted with non-collapsible batons, which the officer may, as a measure of convenience, often resort to removing from their belt when seating themselves in a vehicle. This often results in leaving the baton behind when an officer is exiting the vehicle, and not readily expecting trouble.
- Non-collapsible batons are typically carried in a ring-type belt attachment. Fixed batons carried in such holders may easily fall out of the holder when the officer wearing the baton sprints. Neither holding the baton down in the ring with a hand nor holding the baton in the hand is a good solution. The typical collapsible straight baton and its scabbard do not suffer this and remain secure regardless of the wearing officer's movement.
- In theory, the mere display of extending the baton may in some instances be terrifying to an aggressive person (due to both the sight and sound of the action, with a similar intimidation technique as used with pump-action shotguns), and may thus de-escalate the situation through fear-motivated submission of the target without physical violence.
- A collapsible baton may be deployed against a suspect whether expanded or collapsed; expanded, the baton's reach is extended, but collapsed, the baton is handier in close quarters. This provides greater versatility in a wider range of environments over the fixed-length baton.
- A collapsible baton is essentially a heavy steel rod with usually a slightly wider tip, that concentrates the force of a blow more effectively and to a smaller area than a polycarbonate baton. This results in a strike that impacts harder to the muscle and causes deeper pain, removing the need for several strikes when targeting large muscle groups. Striking bones will cause serious damage.

==== Disadvantages ====
Expandable batons have some disadvantages:

- Some police may prefer to carry a fixed baton due to the greater intimidation it may provide. Similarly, a fixed baton serves better as a conspicuous symbol of authority (i.e., "badge of office") than a collapsed expandable baton.
- Fixed batons may often be less expensive than their collapsible counterparts of identical or similar quality. Because of this, some law enforcement departments, such as the Los Angeles County Sheriff's Department, may issue a fixed-length baton but have their officers/deputies purchase expandable batons at the option and expense of the individual officer.
- Fixed batons may be inherently faster to bring into action because they do not need to be extended before usage as an impact weapon (unless one wishes to use a collapsible baton in collapsed form). It is, however, possible to deliver a strike whilst opening the baton in one fluid motion if the officer is correctly trained. This is called a "rapid response strike".
- If an expandable baton is of friction-lock design, as most are, there is an inherent risk that the baton may inadvertently close at an inopportune moment while being used to strike. This also prevents expandable batons from being used to prod or thrust.
- In a situation in which stealth is required, a collapsed baton may rattle, revealing the officer's position.
- Most expandable batons have most of their weight concentrated at the grip and the tip tends to be the lightest part since it is the thinnest part of the baton. As such it may deliver less forceful blows than a fixed baton.

=== Multi-tool batons ===
Since early law enforcement professionals were very reliant on their batons there was a popular movement to outfit police batons with implements like whistles, torches/flashlights and tear gas. At least four models were built with weapon-retention devices that would deploy "sharp spikes or blades" in case a suspect tried to grab an officer's baton. There is even a mention of two early 20th century patents for batons with guns built into the frame in American Police Equipment.

== Similar weapons ==
=== Blackjacks and saps ===
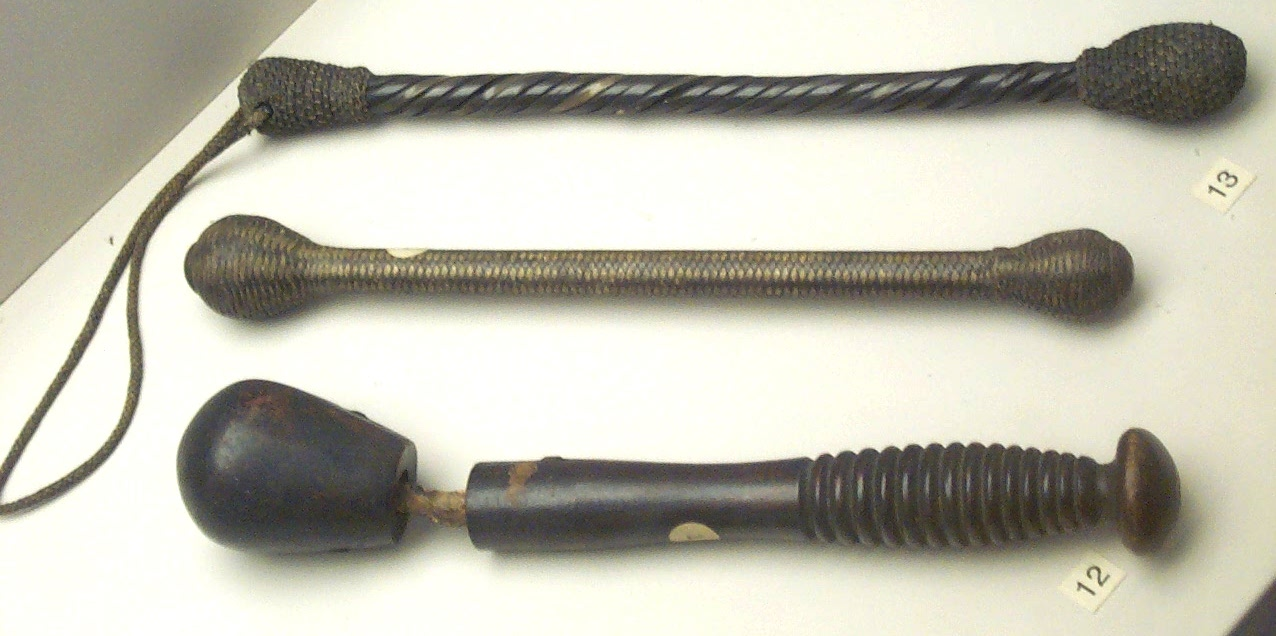
Two blackjacks and a hinged club on display at The Higgins Art Gallery & Museum in Bedford, Bedfordshire, UK

The terms blackjack, cosh, and sap refer to any of several short, easily concealed club weapons consisting of a dense (often lead) weight attached to the end of a short shaft. A form of bludgeon, these use a handle to accelerate the dense core and transfer kinetic energy from the swing to it. The blow can be directed at any normal blunt-force target, but strikes delivered to the head can induce concussions. While usually meant to stun or knock out the subject, head strikes have a high risk of causing permanent, disabling brain injuries or fatalities.

The terminology applied to these weapons can be imprecise, depend on the source and time period, and may refer to an improvised device accomplishing the same result. Blackjacks have long been a favorite of the criminal element as a concealed carry weapon and are illegal to privately own in many jurisdictions.

A late 19th-century type is a wooden shaft about one foot long, with a leather- or macramé-covered lead ball as the head. This weapon is referred to by some sources as a "sap" (derived from "sapling" due to its wood handle) or euphemistically as a "life-preserver". The term "cosh" may also originate with this weapon, being derived from the Romani word kašt, meaning "stick" or "piece of wood". The term "blackjack" referring to a hand weapon is of unknown etymology, and the earliest text reference is 1889.

A type used by 19th- and early 20th-century sailors for both self-defense and aggression was weighted with a lead ball at one or both ends of a piece of baleen, which was then wrapped in woven or plaited marline or codline and varnished over. Some carefully made examples were likely to have been used by a boatswain or ship's master-at-arms or ship's mate as a badge of office and discipline-enforcer, so some modern sources call this weapon a "bosun's cosh". The term "blackjack" is sometimes applied by early 20th-century maritime sources to a lead weight knotted or woven into the end of a short piece of rope that serves as a handle, though most sources would consider this weapon a type of slungshot.

In the 20th century, newer shorter (and more readily concealable) designs emerged that were predominantly made of stitched or braided leather, with a flexible spring inside the handle to impart a whip-like action to compensate for leverage and acceleration, although sacrificing overall length. To balance forces and minimize unintended damage, this style came to employ flexible materials such as lead shot as weights.

Law enforcement sources from the mid-20th century preferred to divide these into two categories: "blackjacks", which have a mostly cylindrical striking head, and "saps", which have a flat, usually oval-shaped head. In common usage, however, these terms have become interchangeable, so a "sap" of this latter kind is sometimes more precisely called a flat sap, slap jack or beavertail sap to differentiate it. The sap's flat profile makes it easier to carry in a pocket and spreads its impact out over a broader area, making it less likely to break bone. However, it can also be used to strike with the edge for more focused impact, though this was discouraged by most police departments for precisely this reason. Alternatively, some variants use lead shot, powdered metal, or even sand for the weight inside the head, usually called a "soft sap", which reduces the likelihood of bone fractures, particularly of the skull.

Blackjacks and saps were popular among law enforcement for a time due to their low profile, small size, and effectiveness in very close range, such as when grappling with a suspect. Besides the head, they were also used on the elbows, wrists, shins, collarbone, and groin. The flat sap, in particular, could be used to strike large muscle groups with the edge. In the early days of use, they were favored for their ability to stun or knock a suspect unconscious with a blow to the head. By the late 1960s, head-strikes with impact weapons in general were strongly discouraged by most police departments and trainers because of the risk of death or permanent injury, as well as its questionable effectiveness. By the 1990s, virtually all modern police departments had phased them out from their issued equipment, and most banned their use entirely.

=== Stunguns ===
Stun batons are an unusual modern variation designed to administer an electric shock in order to incapacitate the target. They consist of an insulated handle and guard, and a rigid shaft usually a foot or more in length for delivering a shock. Many designs function like an elongated stun gun or a cattle prod, requiring the tip to be held against the target and then manually triggering a shock by a switch in the handle. Some more sophisticated designs carry a charge along the shaft's entire surface, administering a shock on contact. This later design is especially useful in preventing the officer from having their weapon grabbed and taken away by an assailant.

Most batons of this design were not intended to be used as impact weapons and will break if used in this way, though a few were built to withstand occasional lighter impacts. They are rarely issued to patrol officers in modern times due to their price and the other associated problems with electroshock weapons.

=== Jitte ===
The jitte was a Japanese Edo period police weapon consisting of a round or octagonal metal rod about 30–61 cm (12–24 in) long with a hook-like guard above the handle. It was used in a similar manner to modern police batons and it continued to be issued in Japan to some police departments until the early 20th century. The jitte eventually inspired an early form of expandable baton called a tokushu keibo in the 1960s.

=== Improvised ===
Some non-purpose-built items have been used by law enforcement over the centuries as impact weapons. Some examples include:

- Crowbars
- Baseball bats
- Oars or paddles
- Pickaxe handles

=== Flashlights ===
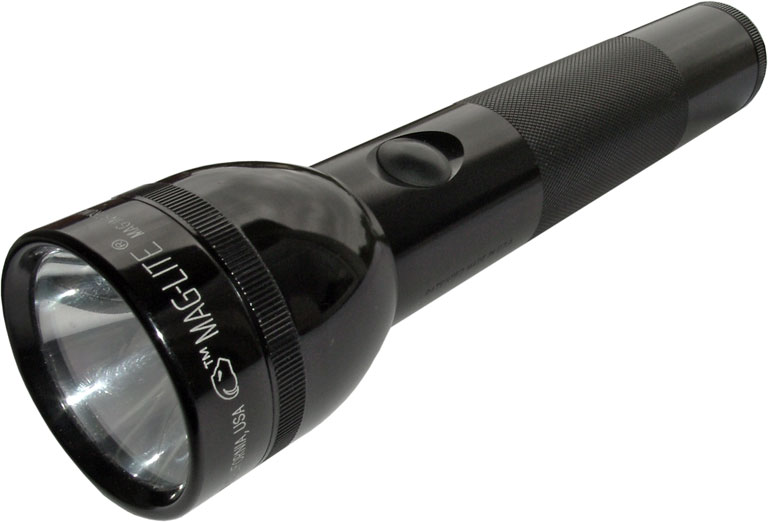
A Maglite 2 D cell flashlight

Although the Kel-Lite in the 1970s appears to have been the first flashlight designed specifically to be useful as an emergency weapon, the best-known example is the large, metal D-cell Maglite, still in use by some law enforcement and security personnel. Use of such flashlights as a club or baton is generally officially discouraged by the manufacturers and law enforcement officials, but its use is an option. As with all police weapons, there have been many examples of misuse, such as in the Malice Green beating in Detroit. The use of flashlights as improvised impact weapons is subject to the same use of force regulations as the use of purpose-designed impact weapons like batons.

Police officers may often choose to use such flashlights because they are viewed primarily as illumination devices; thus, if a police officer carries one in their hands during nighttime encounters with potentially violent subjects, it would be less likely to escalate the situation (by making the subject feel threatened) than if the officer were to be equipped with a baton or pepper spray canister instead. This permits the officer to appear less threatening while having an impact weapon in hand and ready for instantaneous action, should the situation indeed turn violent.

Characteristic of a flashlight used as a baton or club is the grip employed. Flashlights are commonly held with the bulb end pointing from the thumb side of the hand, such that it is pointing outward from the body when held palm upward. When wielded as a club, the bulb end points inward when the hand is palm upward, and the grip is closely choked to the bulb end. Another advantage to using a flashlight as a club is that in poorly lit situations it can be used to initially dazzle the eyes of an opponent. Law enforcement officers often deliberately shine flashlight beams into the eyes of suspects at night to cause temporary night-blindness as a preemptive defensive measure, whether or not the individual is likely to behave violently. The weight of a flashlight makes it a clumsy baton, unable to be swung swiftly.

== Legality ==
Batons are legal for sworn law enforcement and military in most countries around the world. However, the legality of civilian carry for purpose-built batons varies greatly by country, and by local jurisdictions.

=== Brazil ===
There are no restrictions about batons to the general public, but private security guards can only carry wooden or rubber batons (no length is specified) according to Law 7102/83. They may also carry electric shock batons if they have a Less-Lethal Certification course. There is a general belief in Brazil that rubber batons are less prone to break bones than the wooden ones.

=== Canada ===
There is no law that prohibits batons; except for spring-loaded batons, which are defined as a prohibited weapon under a regulation entitled "Regulations Prescribing Certain Firearms and other Weapons, Components and Parts of Weapons, Accessories, Cartridge Magazines, Ammunition and Projectiles as Prohibited or Restricted" (also capable of being referred to by its registration number: SOR 98–462). However, it is a crime under section 90 of the Criminal Code to carry any weapon, including a baton, in a concealed fashion.

=== Hong Kong ===
According to Cap 217 (Weapons Ordinance), Laws of Hong Kong, any person who has possession of any prohibited items commits an offence, which includes expandable batons.

=== Indian subcontinent ===
In India, Pakistan, Bangladesh and Nepal, police often carry a large bamboo (in India, Bangladesh and Nepal) or cedar (in Pakistan) stick called a lathi (Odia: ବାଡ଼ି, Tamil: குறுந்தடி, Hindi: लाठी) that is used during riot controlling or used when a person is arrested or for self or public defence.

=== Ireland ===
In Ireland, telescopic truncheons are classified as illegal offensive weapons.

=== Sweden ===
All types of batons can be owned but not carried in public spaces by private citizens according to law (1988:254).

=== United Kingdom ===
Straight, side-handled (PR-24) and friction-lock batons were added to the list of offensive weapons in 2004 (except Scotland, where they were added in 2005), which prohibited their manufacture, sale, hire, offering for sale or hire, lending or giving to any other person under Section 141 Criminal Justice Act 1988. A loophole exists by way of martial arts weapons such as the tonfa being legal to own, which is the exact same design as the side-handle baton. The telescopic truncheon – defined as being a truncheon which extends automatically by hand pressure applied to a button, spring or other device in or attached to its handle – was banned in the original 1988 order.

Section 46 of the Offensive Weapons Act 2019, passed in May 2019, prohibits possession even in a private dwelling (e.g. home, closed off building site, behind a sales counter, etc.); previously, possession in private was permitted after meeting certain conditions based on ownership.

=== United States ===
Legality is determined by the laws of the individual states. Some, such as Vermont or Arizona, allow for legal carry in the absence of unlawful behavior or criminal intent. Others previously prohibited possession but constitutional challenges have overturned the bans, e.g. Connecticut v. DeCiccio (2009) and Hawaii. California has a general prohibition against the carrying of all "club" weapons by non-law enforcement. Constitutional challenges to California's law had failed prior to the United States Supreme Court's decision in New York State Rifle & Pistol Association, Inc. v. Bruen. However, in 2024, US District Court Judge Roger Benitez found that California's ban on club-like weapons was unconstitutional in light of the Supreme Court's Bruen opinion. Jurisdictions with general prohibitions will sometimes make exceptions for persons employed as security guards or bodyguards, will provide for permits to be obtained for legal carry, or make exceptions for persons who complete an appropriate training course.

== See also ==
- Espantoon
- Flexible baton round
- Jitte
- Knobkierie
- Lathi
- Shillelagh (club)
- Sjambok
- Tonfa
- Weighted-knuckle gloves
- Sali
- Patu
- Kanak war clubs
