= Maglite =

Brand of flashlight

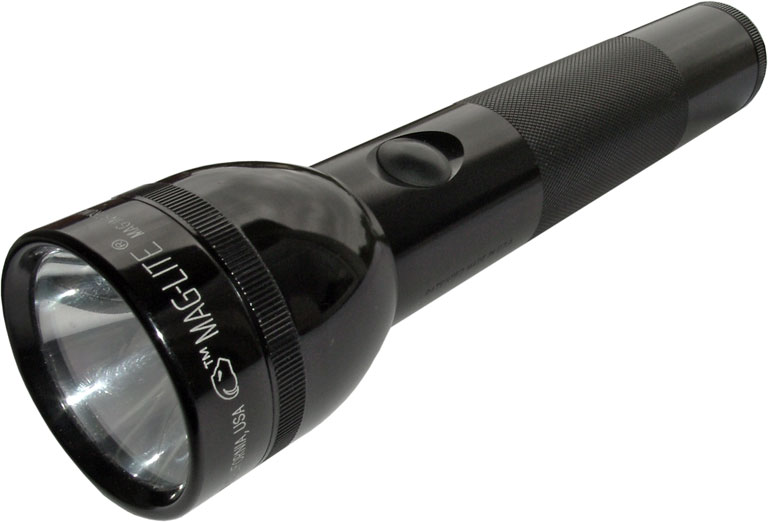
Maglite 2 D cell flashlight

Maglite (also spelled Mag-Lite, stylized as MAGLITE or MAG-LITE) is a brand of flashlight manufactured in the United States by Mag Instrument, Inc. located in Ontario, California, and founded by Anthony Maglica. It was introduced in 1979. Constructed principally of anodized 6061 aluminum, they have a variable-focus beam. Maglites are produced in several colors such as black, silver, blue, red, green, purple, gold, and different finishes. Originally Maglite flashlights used krypton or xenon incandescent bulbs. Current models have LEDs, although the older models are still widely available.

Accessories include belt holsters, mounting brackets, colored and glass lenses, attachable fiber optics extensions to bend light output into a cramped space, higher-powered incandescent bulbs, and LED conversion modules. The Maglite was an improvement over the Kel-Lite, after which the Maglite was patterned.

== Timeline ==
A list of the sizes of Mag Instrument flashlights, and the years they were released:

- 1979: D and C battery models are put on the market; targeted to the public safety and industrial sectors (the 5C, 6C, 7C and 7D models are out of production)
- 1982: MagCharger: a larger more expensive model popular with public safety and emergency-services personnel. This light is much brighter than typical Maglites, and uses an incandescent Halogen bulb and a rechargeable NiCad or NiMH battery pack.
- 1984: Two AA cell batteries (Mini Maglite) Maglite's first personal size flashlight
- 1987: Two AAA cell batteries (Mini Maglite) A smaller version of the original Mini Maglite
- 1988: One AAA cell battery (Maglite Solitaire) Mag Instrument's key chain flashlight.
- 2006: Maglite LED Flashlight and Upgrade Module: 3-watt Luxeon III LED from Lumileds.
- 2006: Mini Maglite LED 2AA.
- 2008: MagCharger: Upgraded Nickel/Metal Hydride (NiMH) battery pack increases charge time and second generation Halogen bulb increases light output.
- 2009: Next Generation Mag-LED Technology: Featuring a new Luxeon Rebel LED and extended battery life.
- 2010: Maglite XL100: offers a motion-controlled user interface using a built-in accelerometer
- 2010: Maglite XL50: This is a simpler version of the XL100, featuring three modes that can be activated with consecutive presses of the tailcap switch. The XL50 will have a lower retail price than the XL100.
- 2011: A variety of LED and rechargeable flashlights introduced. These include the ML100 and the rechargeable/C Cell LED ML125
- 2011: Maglite XL200: This is similar to the XL100 but offers higher lumen output.
- 2012: Mini Maglite AA Pro 215 Lumens and Mini Maglite AA Pro+ 245 Lumens.
- 2012: Maglite 2D pro 274 Lumens with a Cree XP-G rather than a Cree XP-E, increasing brightness while decreasing beam distance efficiency.
- 2012: Maglite Mag-Tac flashlight plain bezel, 310 Lumens, low mode at around 100 Lumens. First Maglite flashlight to use CR123A batteries. Tactical style designed with military input.
- 2012: Maglite Mag-Tac crowned bezel, 320 lumens. This model has no low mode for light output.
- 2012: The V4 was released with a newly developed electronic switch enabling a Multi Mode operation and a slightly more powerful bulb producing an output of 245 Lumens.
- 2012: In August, Maglite announced several new models including an LED version of the Solitaire, a Mini Maglite LED 2 AAA and a new version of the 2D LED termed the 2D LED Pro promising a beam in excess of 200 Lumens.
- 2013: Maglite released an LED version of the MagCharger. Features a 680 lumen output and spot-to-flood beam with a quarter turn of the head. Claimed 4 hours of battery life on a full charge at full power. Other specs are as the Incandescent Version.

== Models ==
Past Maglite Models
Model	Incandescent	LED	Notes
Marquis	Maglite Marquis 1-CELL AAA		The Marquis was the original name for the Solitaire.
Mini Maglite		Mini Maglite LED 3-CELL AA	
		Mini Maglite PRO+ LED 2-CELL AA	Around 2012, the PRO+ had an output of 245 lumens, while the regular PRO had 226 lumens. However, the PRO+ has high and low modes, while the regular PRO just has a single mode. The current Mini PRO in 2025 has 332 lumens.
Maglite XL		Maglite LED XL100	
		Maglite LED XL200	
Maglite D		Maglite PRO LED 2-CELL D	
	Maglite 7-CELL D		Made from 1979 to 1982, they sold poorly due to their size and minimal increase in light output over the 6D. Today, they are rare and sought after by collectors.
Maglite C	Maglite 2-CELL C	Maglite ML100 LED 2-CELL C	
	Maglite 3-CELL C	Maglite ML100 LED 3-CELL C	The ML100 LED 3-CELL C has the same lumen output as the ML100 LED 2-CELL C at 137 lumens, however, the run time is increased from 13 hours to 34 hours on high.
		Maglite ML125 LED 3-CELL C	The ML125 uses either 3 C cell batteries, or a NiMH battery.
	Maglite 4-CELL C		
	Maglite 5-CELL C		
	Maglite 6-CELL C		
	Maglite 7-CELL C		Much like the 7D, the 7C is one of the rarest Maglite flashlights.
Rechargeable	MagCharger - NiMH/Halogen		Maglite still sells the bi-pin halogen replacement lamp.

Current Maglite Models
Model	Incandescent	LED	Notes
Solitaire	Maglite Solitaire 1-CELL AAA	Maglite LED Solitaire 1-CELL AAA	Incandescent version in production since 1988.
Mini Maglite	Mini Maglite 2-CELL AAA	Mini Maglite LED 2-CELL AAA	
	Mini Maglite 2-CELL AA	Mini Maglite LED 2-CELL AA	Incandescent version in production since 1984.
		Mini Maglite PRO LED 2-CELL AA	The PRO version of the Mini Maglite has more lumens and throw over the regular version.
Maglite XL		Maglite LED XL50	
Maglite D	Maglite 2-CELL D	Maglite ML300L LED 2-CELL D	
		Maglite ML300LX LED 2-CELL D	
	Maglite 3-CELL D	Maglite ML300L LED 3-CELL D	The 3D incandescent is the original Maglite. It is also the only Maglite still being sold with a KPR lamp. The rest of the incandescent models use the bi-pin xenon.
		Maglite ML300LX LED 3-CELL D	
	Maglite 4-CELL D	Maglite ML300L LED 4-CELL D	
	Maglite 5-CELL D		Maglite currently does not make an LED version of the 5D.
	Maglite 6-CELL D	Maglite ML300L LED 6-CELL D	The ML300L 6D has a lower lumen output than the 3D and 4D LED models, but it has the highest run time at 71 hours on high.
Maglite C	Maglite ML25IT 2-CELL C	Maglite ML25IT LED 2-CELL	All of the ML25IT models come with a twist-on head, rather than the traditional side switch.
		Maglite ML50L LED 2-CELL C	
		Maglite ML50LX LED 2-CELL C	
	Maglite ML25IT 3-CELL C	Maglite ML25IT LED 3-CELL	
		Maglite ML50L LED 3-CELL C	
		Maglite ML50LX LED 3-CELL C	
Rechargeable		Maglite ML150LR	Delivers up to 1,082 lumens.
		Maglite ML150LRX	Matte black version of the ML150LR.
		Maglite ML150LRS	Smaller and lower output version of the ML150LR. Still delivers up to 819 lumens.
		Maglite ML150LRSX	Matte black version of the ML150LRS.
		Maglite MAG-TAC Plain	Delivers up to 671 lumens, but will only last 1 hour on high. On low mode, it will last up to 18 hours.
		Maglite MAG-TAC Crowned	
Maglite MAG-TAC		Maglite MAG-TAC LED 2-CELL CR123 Plain	
		Maglite MAG-TAC LED 2-CELL CR123 Crowned	Same as the "Plain" version, but replaces the low mode with strobe, and has a crowned bezel.
		Maglite MAG-TAC 2 LED 2-CELL CR123 Plain	The MAG-TAC 2 has more lumens and throw over the regular MAG-TAC, and the body is designed for maximum grip for striking or holding with a firearm. Costs $40 more than original MAG-TAC.
		Maglite MAG-TAC LED 2-CELL CR123 Crowned	Same as the "Plain" version, but replaces the low mode with strobe, and has a crowned bezel. Costs $40 more than original MAG-TAC.

Current Spectrum Models
Models	Light Color	Lumens
Solitaire	Warm White	32
	Blue	14
	Green	30
Mini AAA	Warm White	68
	Blue	31
	Green	78
Mini AA	Warm White	57
	Blue	27
	Green	45
XL50	Warm White	140
	Blue	61
	Green	143
	Red	114

== Law enforcement use ==
Maglite flashlights have been known to be used as a ready substitute for a baton. In 2004, the Los Angeles Police Commission moved to use smaller flashlights, with Alan Skobin, the commission vice-president, stating that "This policy makes clear flashlights are for illumination and discourages their use as an impact tool. And it ensures officer safety as well as protects the public."

Police and security personnel often use full-size Maglite flashlights due to their durability, brightness, and weight, which can also make them suitable for use as improvised defensive tools.

On March 30, 2007, the Los Angeles Police Department announced that they would be switching to a smaller, lighter LED flashlight that cannot be used as a baton, in response to a highly publicized incident where an officer was accused of using excessive force against a suspect by using a Maglite.

== Gallery ==
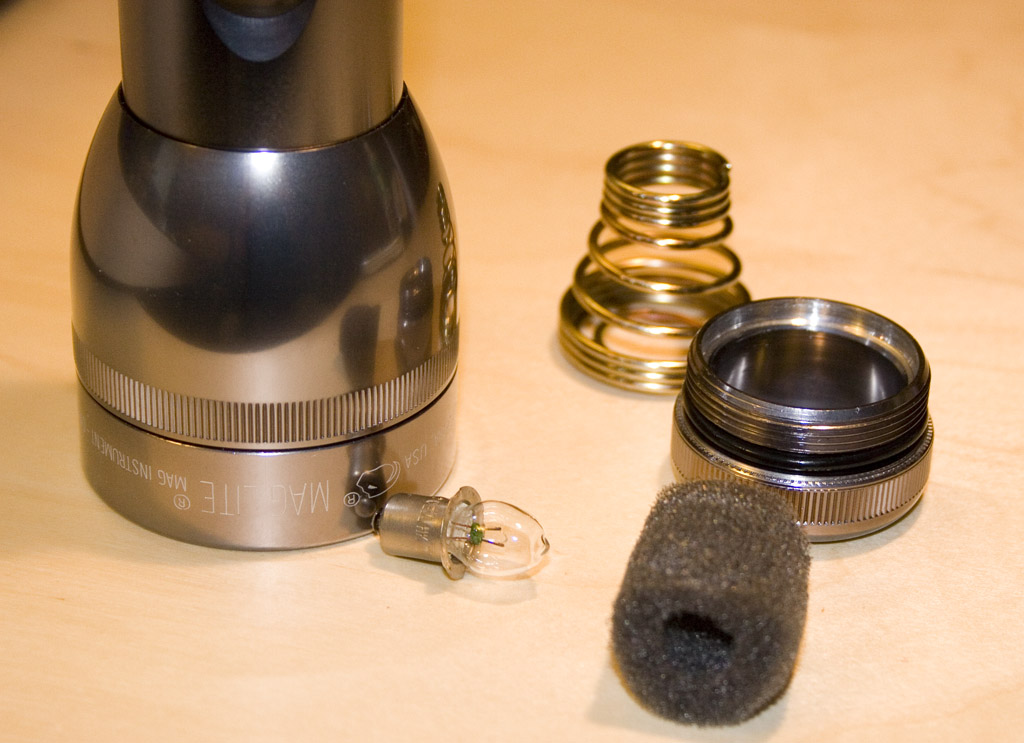
Most Maglites have a spare bulb in the tailcap. LED lamps have a long life, and do not usually need to be replaced. Some LED Maglite models have a spare incandescent bulb.

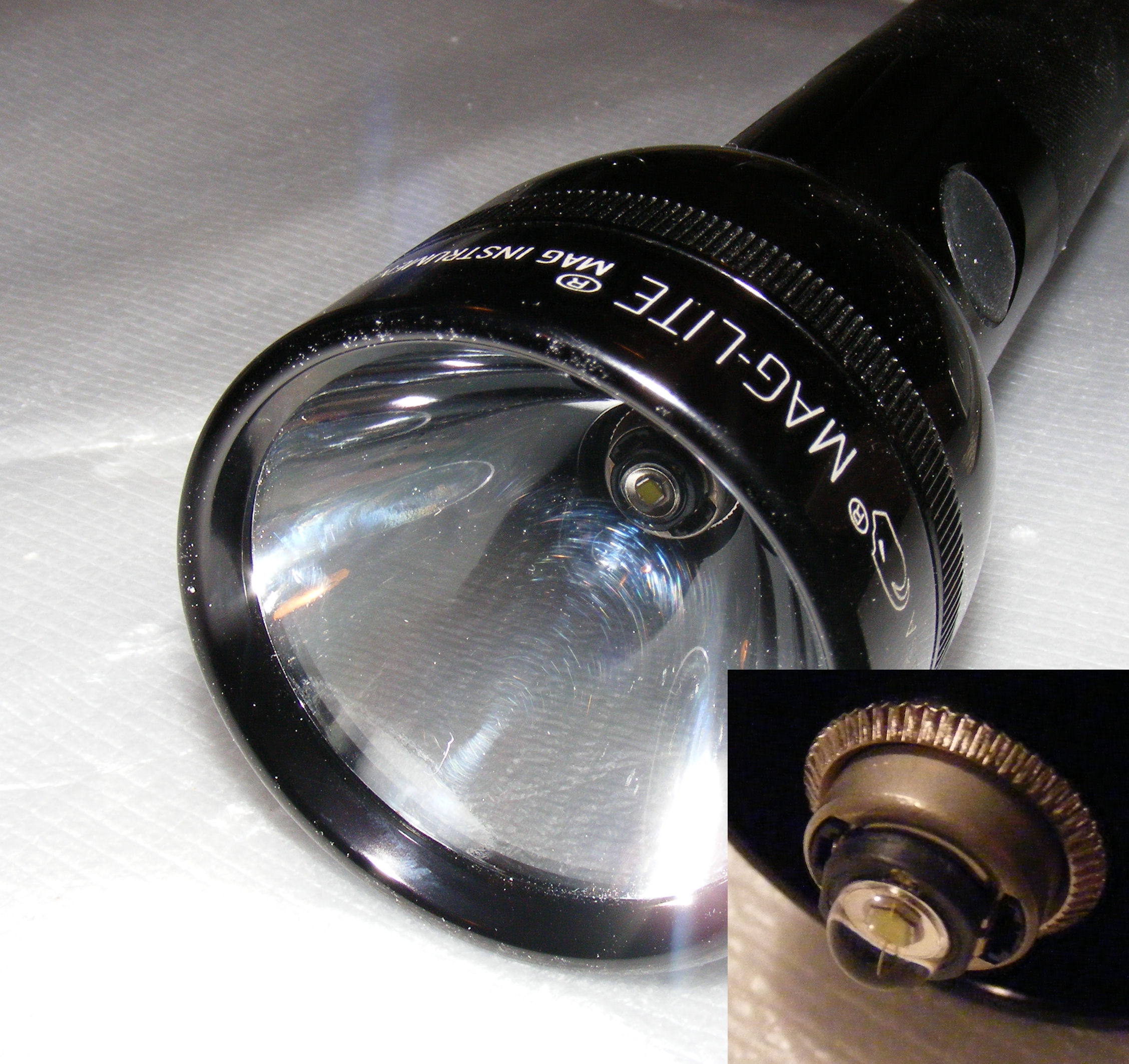
Closeup view of a 4D Maglite with the factory-installed Luxeon LED module. The inset shows the LED module with the reflector assembly removed.

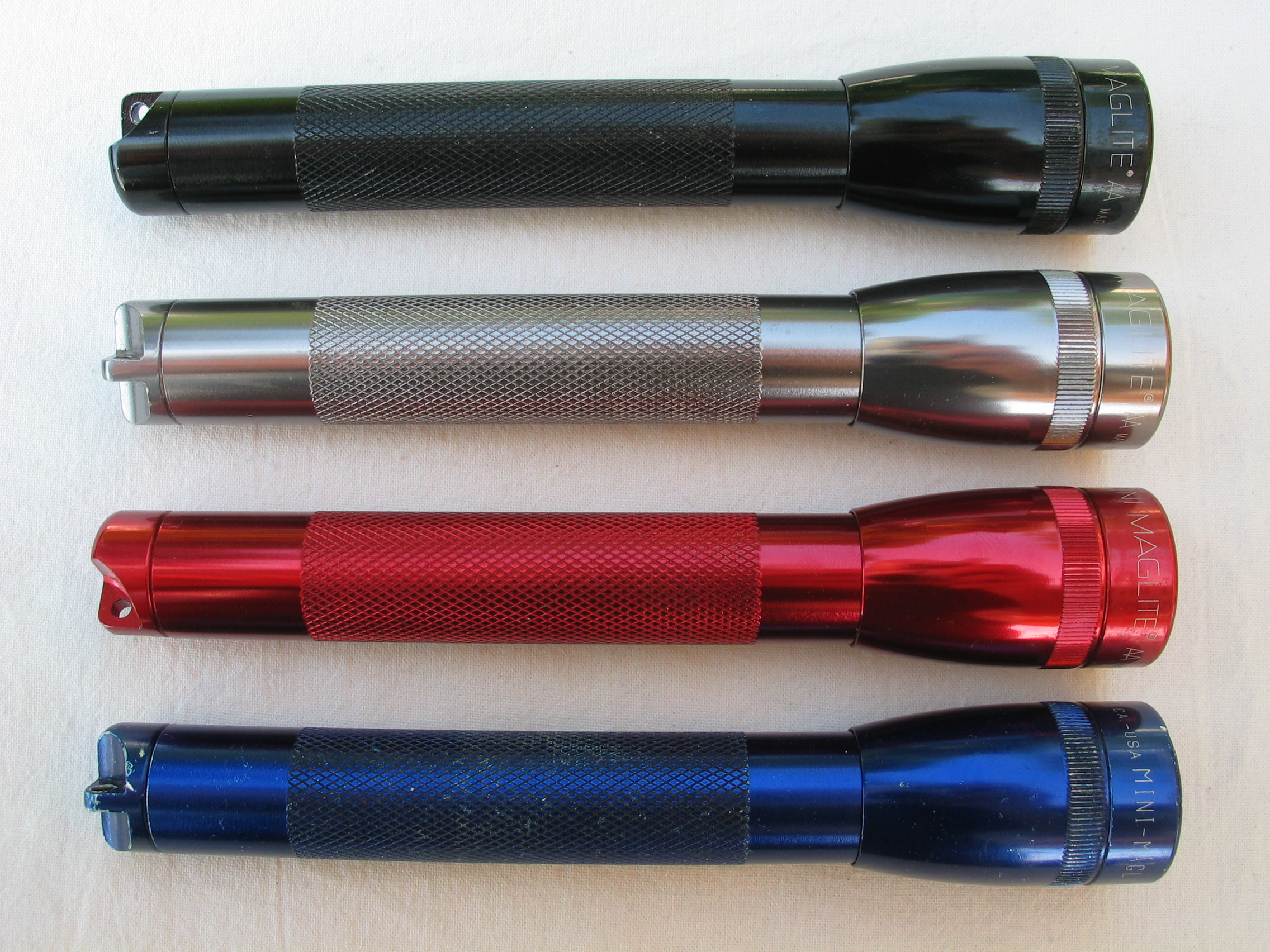
The 2xAA Mini Maglite in four colors

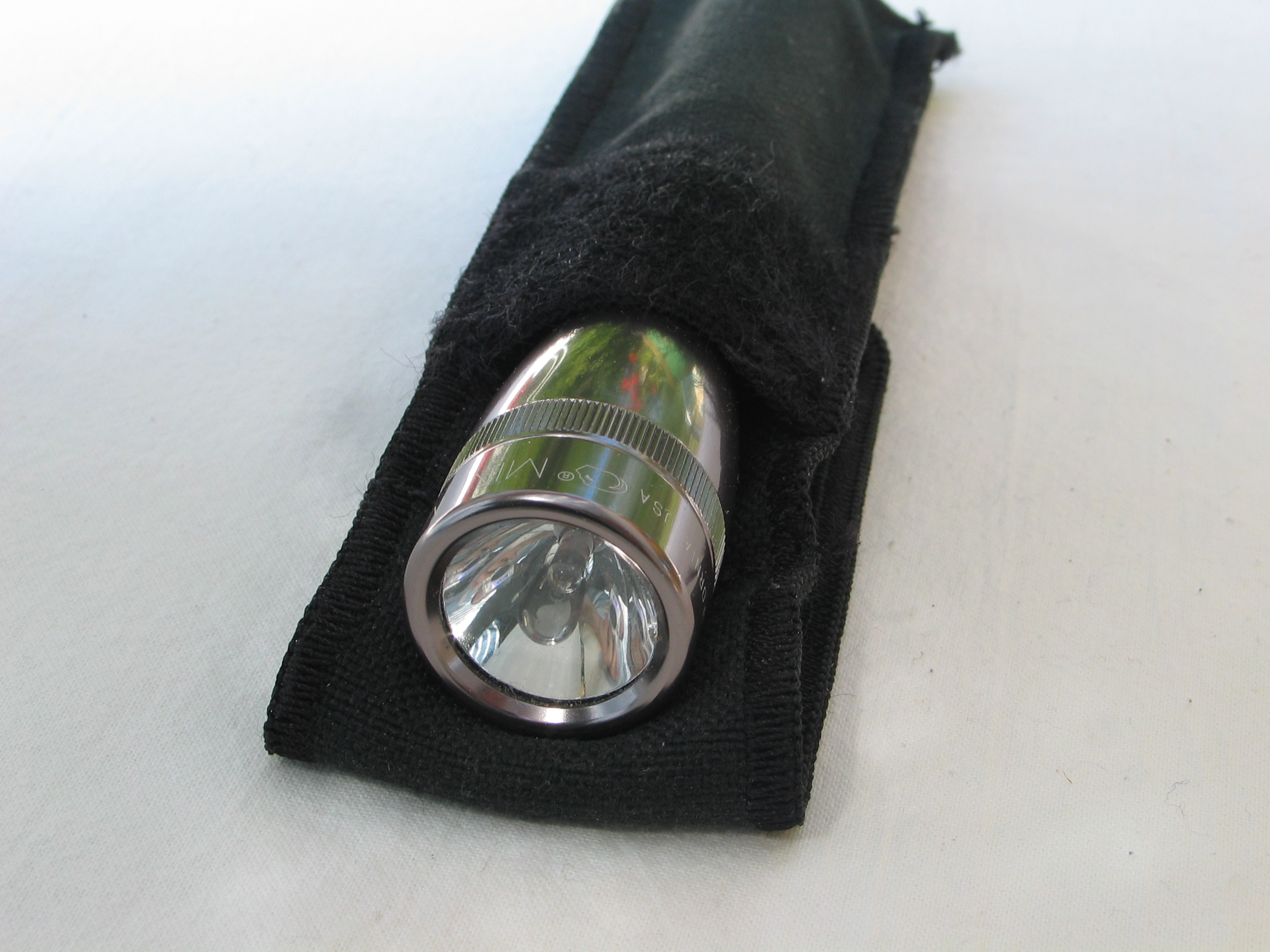
Mini Maglite and belt holster
