= Flail (weapon) =

Weapon consisting of a striking head flexibly attached to a handle

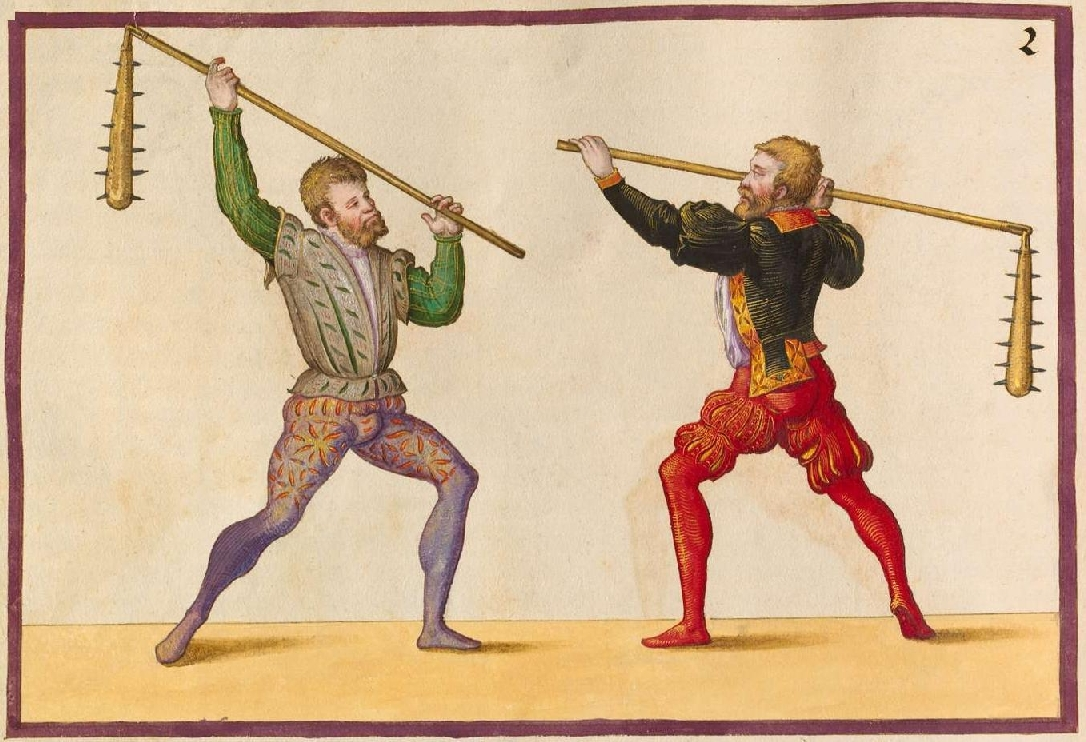
Spiked versions of long-handled peasant flails. From Paulus Hector Mair's combat manual Arte De Athletica

A flail is a weapon consisting of one or more striking heads (also called swingles or swipples) attached to a handle by flexible rope, strap, hinge or chain connectors that can be wielded in combat to produce powerful concussive impacts.

Flails have various tactical virtues, such as being cheap to produce; intuitive to use for those familiar with their tool form; being easily transportable when folded while still allowing the reach of a longer weapon when used; and having the capacity to strike around a defender's shield or parry attempt, or over an obstacle. Drawbacks include the difficulty in controlling them, their lack of precision in strikes, the difficulty of using them in closely-ranked formations, and their ineffectiveness in close combat grapples. When compared to a rigid weapon of the same length, weight and general configuration, the flail's striking end moves with greater velocity, but hits with less apparent mass, resulting in an impact from the flail that is slightly less than an equivalent rigid weapon.

There are three broad types of flail: firstly, a long, two-handed infantry weapon made from a long staff as the handle and a shorter baton as the swingle connected by a flexible linkage. Secondly, a shorter weapon with a baton handle with one or more metal striking heads attached to this by chains, usually shorter than the handle so as to reduce the risk of the heads hitting the wielder's hand. Thirdly, a longer handled version of the second type so that it can be used two-handed, with one or more heads attached via chains considerably longer than the handle.

== "Peasant flail" type ==
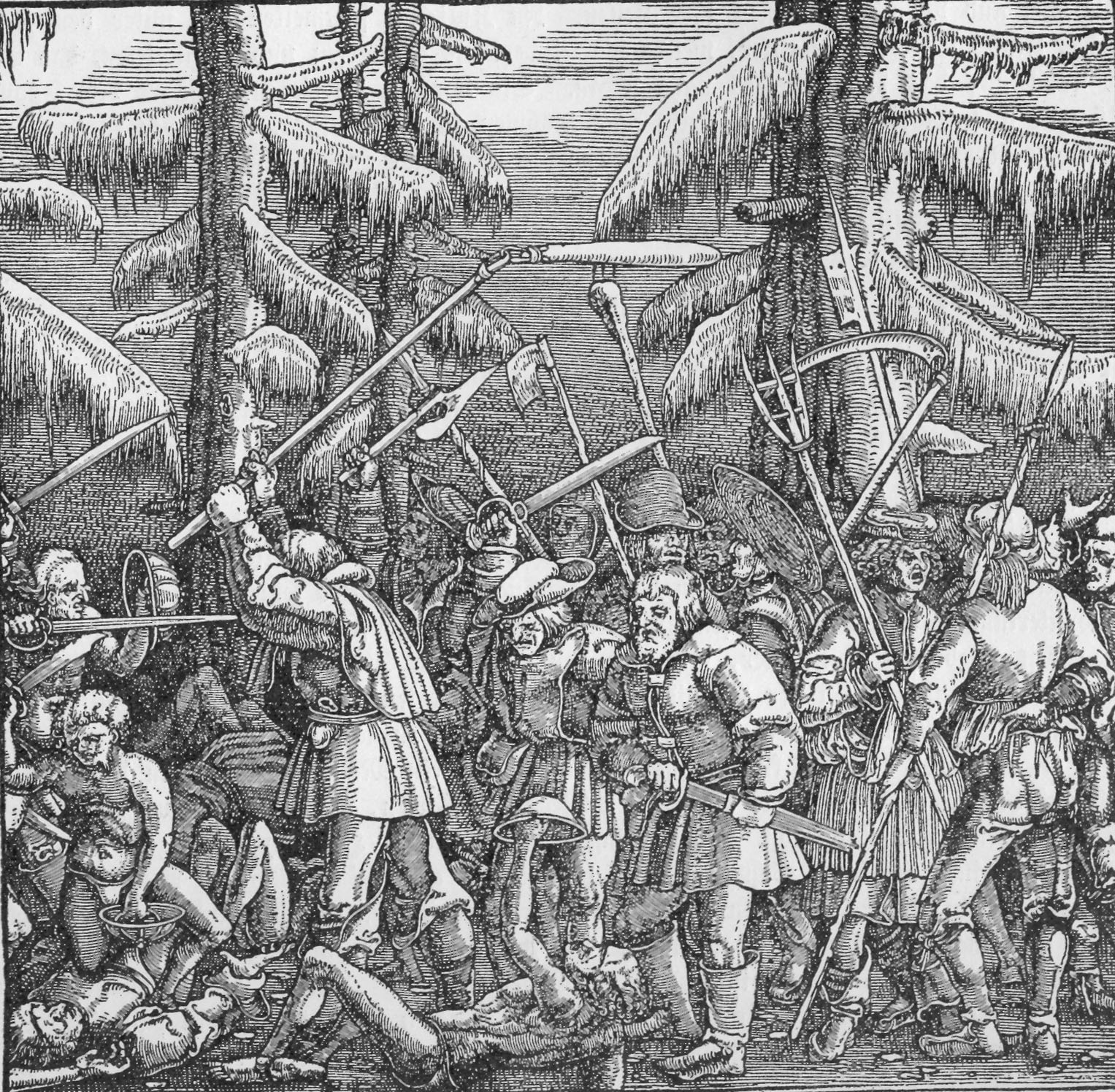
16th century peasant rebels

In the Late Middle Ages, a particular type of flail appears in several works being used as a weapon, which consists of a very long shaft with a hinged, roughly cylindrical striking end. In most cases, these are two-handed agricultural flails, which were sometimes employed as an improvised weapon by peasant armies conscripted into military service or engaged in popular uprisings. For example, in the 1420–1497 period, the Hussites fielded large numbers of peasant foot soldiers armed with this type of flail.

Some of these weapons featured anti personnel studs or spikes embedded in the striking end, or are shown being used by armored knights, suggesting they were made or at least modified specifically to be used as weapons. Such modified flails were used in the German Peasants' War in the early 16th century. Several German martial arts manuals or Fechtbücher from the 15th, 16th and 17th century feature illustrations and lessons on how to use the peasant flail (with or without spikes) or how to defend against it when attacked.

== One-handed military flail ==
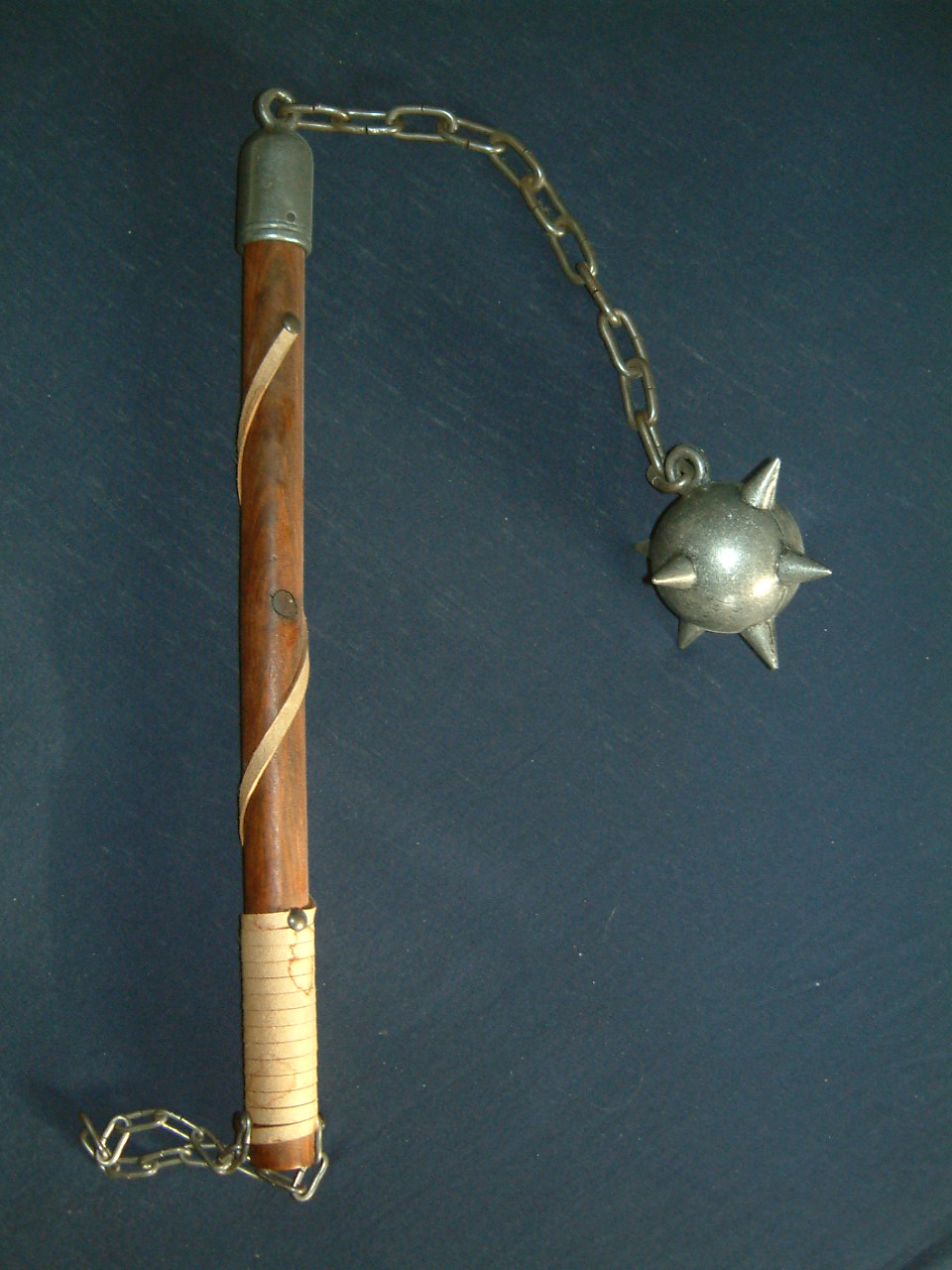
Modern representation of a one-handed flail

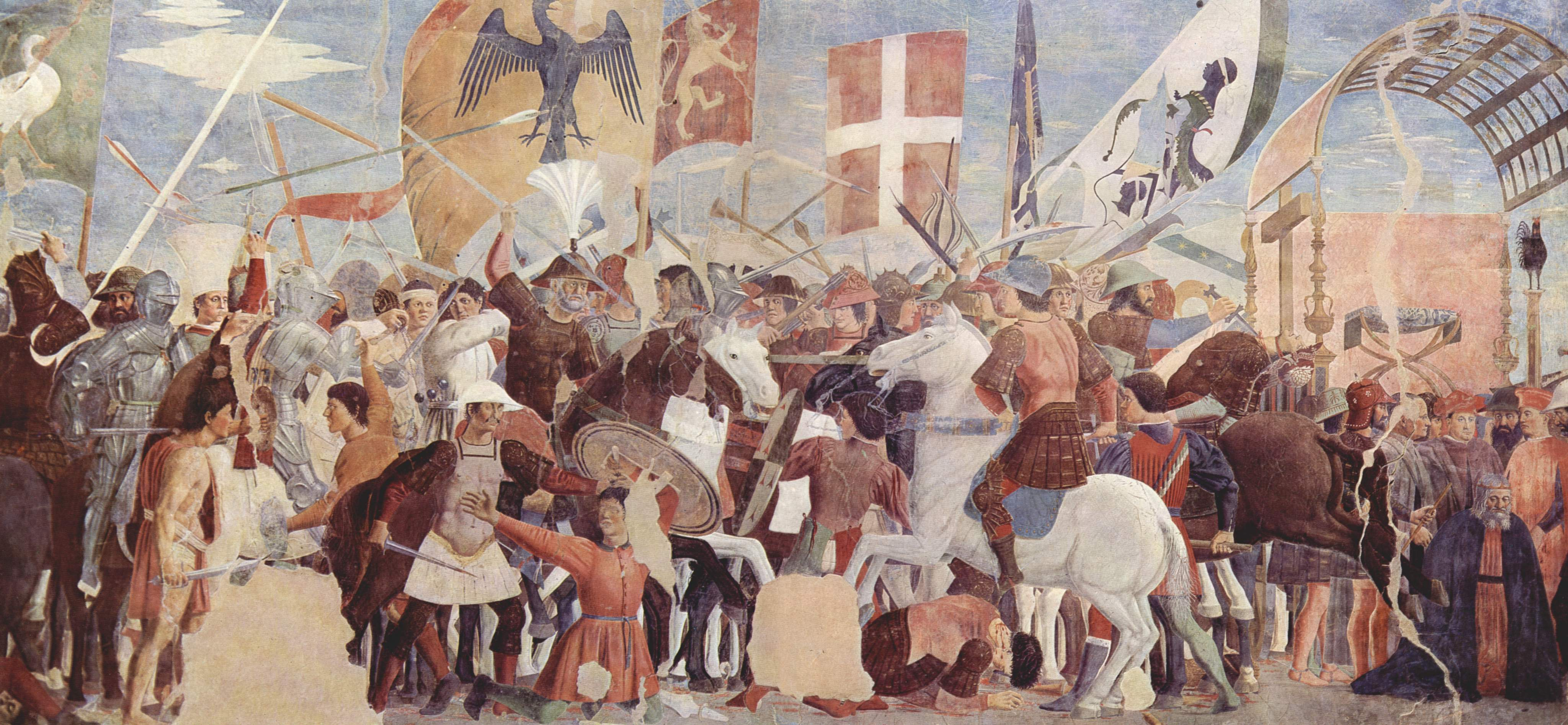
Detail from Battle between Heraclius and Chosroes, painted by Piero della Francesca circa 1452, showing a short flail with three spherical striking ends

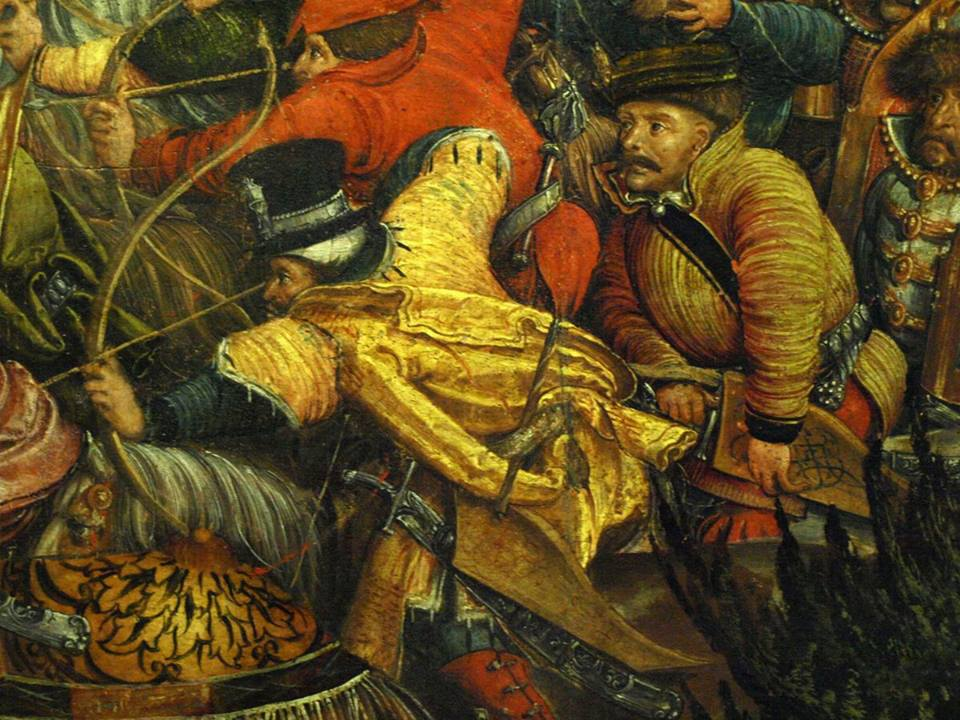
Lithuanian hussar with kisten in his belt. Detail from Battle of Orsha painting, 1520–1534

The other types of European flail are shorter-handled weapons consisting of a wooden haft connected by either short or long chains (or thongs in early versions) to one or more striking heads. The kisten, with a spiked or non-spiked head and a leather or rope connection to the haft, is attested in the 10th century in the territories of the Rus', probably being adopted from either the Avars or Khazars. This weapon spread into Central and Eastern Europe in the 11th–13th centuries, and then further west in Western Europe during the 12th and 13th centuries. The medieval military flail (fléau d'armes in French and Kriegsflegel in German), then, might typically have consisted of a wooden shaft joined by a length of chain to one or more iron-shod wooden bars, or it may have been a Kettenmorgenstern ("chain morning star") with one or more metal balls or morning star in the place of the wooden bars.

Despite being very common in fictional works such as cartoons, films and role-playing games as a "quintessential medieval weapon", historical information about smaller ball-and-chain style flails is rarer than other contemporary weapons. It is speculated that they were less common due to several drawbacks, such being potentially hazardous to their user, as well as having some tactical disadvantages, such as a slower recovery time after an impact or missed swing. For a time period in the 2000s, some historians started to doubt the existence of this specific type of flail due to the scarcity of genuine specimens, the unrealistic way they are depicted in art, and a number of pieces in museums that turned out to be 19th century forgeries when analyzed,. However, subsequent research demonstrated that this view was an overreaction, with several studies showing the weapon existed in the time period, even if they were not commonly used.

== Two-handed military flail ==
A third type, sometimes referred to as a mangual, was popular in Spain and Portugal from the 15th to 17th centuries. This style is primarily a two-handed infantry weapon with very long chains, often longer than the haft. Its usage is detailed in treatises of the 17th century, often discussed alongside the montante. The longer chains of this type creates an "area denial" type weapon that can be wielded in a continuous circular motion to maintain its momentum in a similar manner to the large two-handed swords of the late- and post-medieval periods. The long chains can also be used to entangle around an opponent's weapon as a tactic or as a consequence of being parried.

== Variations outside Europe ==
In Asia, short flails originally employed in threshing rice were adapted into weapons such as the nunchaku or three-section staff. In China, a very similar weapon to the long-handled peasant flail is known as the two-section staff, and Korea has a weapon called a pyeongon. In Japan, there is also a version of the smaller ball-on-a-chain flail called a chigiriki.

In the 18th and 19th centuries, the long-handled flail is found in use in India. An example held in the Pitt Rivers Museum has a wooden ball-shaped head studded with iron spikes. Another in the Royal Armouries collection has two spiked iron balls attached by separate chains.

The knout, a whip or scourge formerly used in Russia for the punishment of criminals, was the descendant of the flail. It was manufactured in many forms, and its effect was so severe that few of those who were subjected to its full force survived the punishment. The Emperor Nicholas I substituted a milder whip for the knout.

== Gallery ==
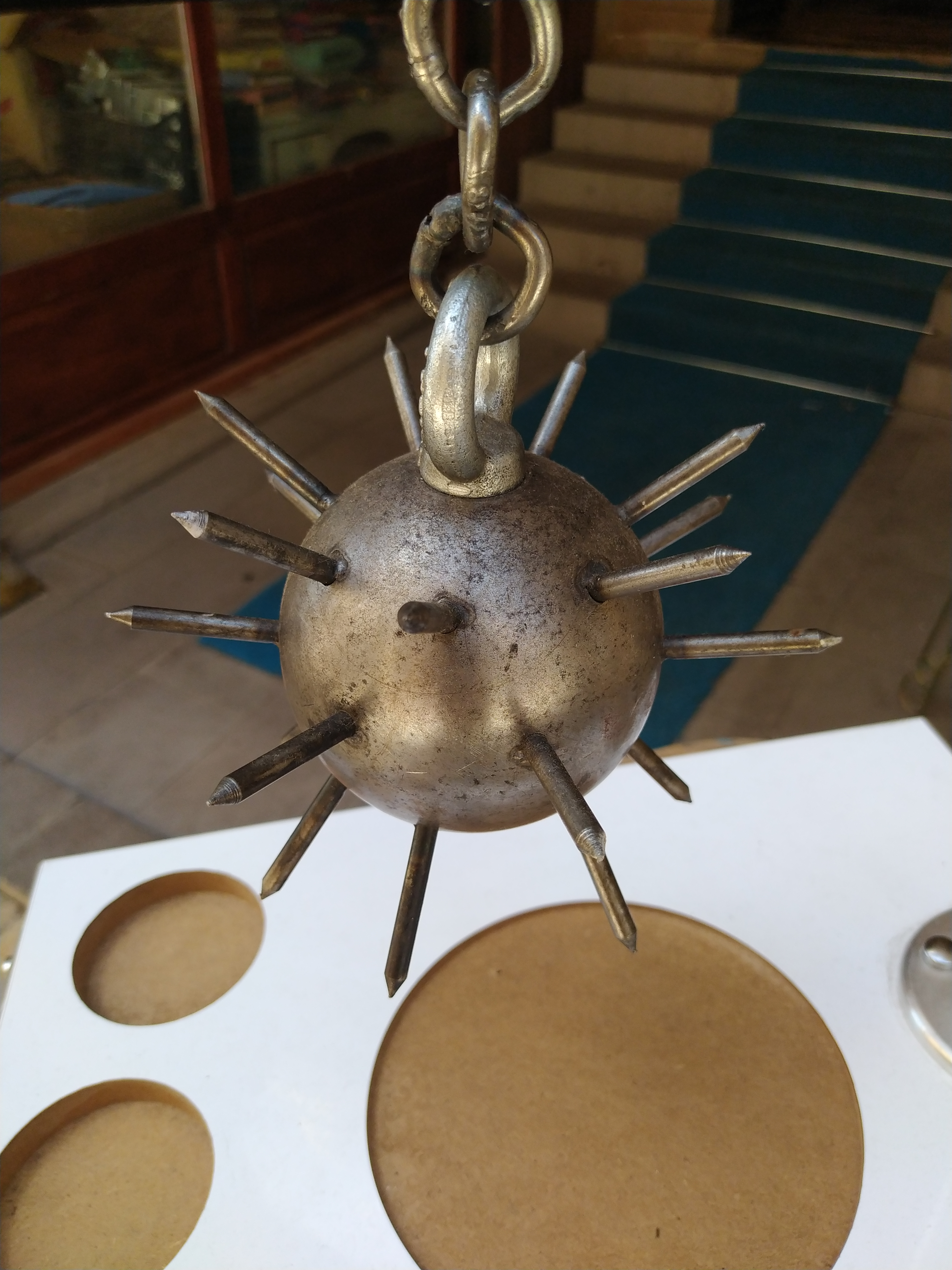
A representative Ottoman flail (replica)

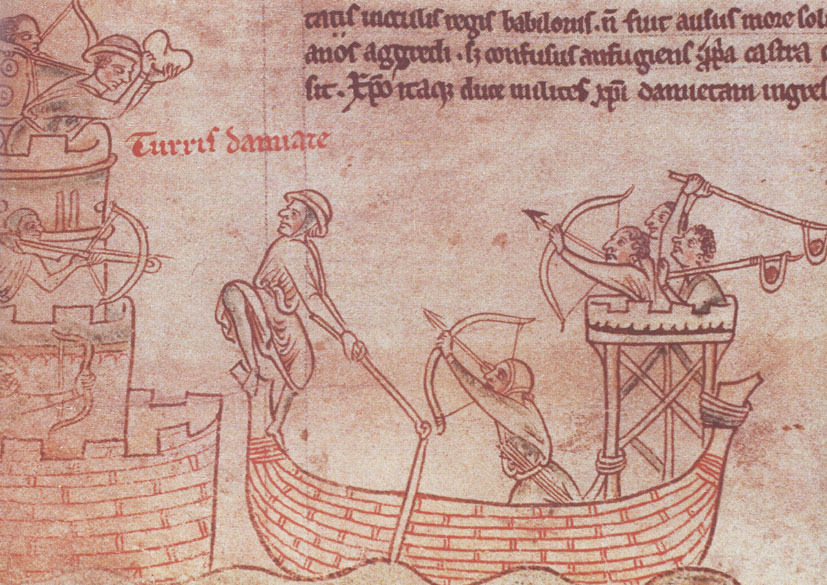
Hayo van Wolvega attacks the tower of Damietta with a flail during the 5th crusade.

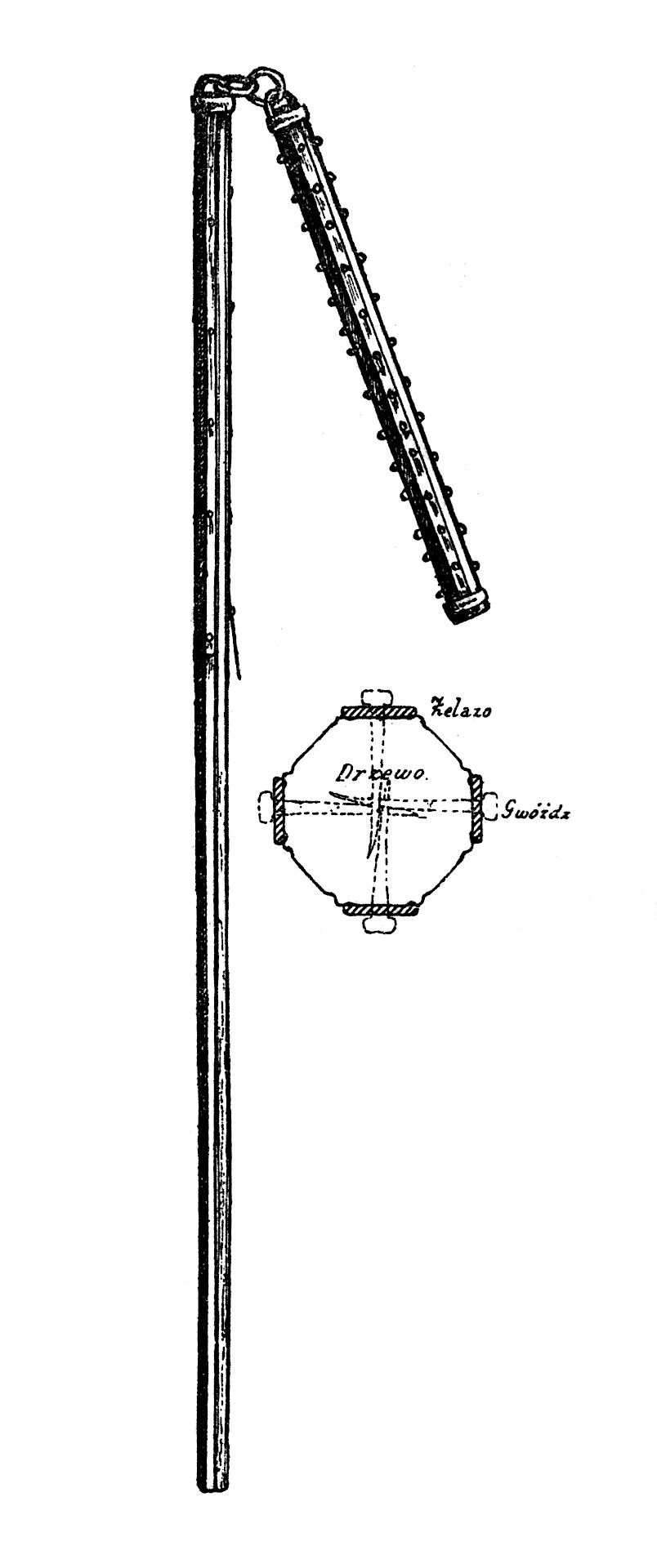
A two-handed flail with metal studs

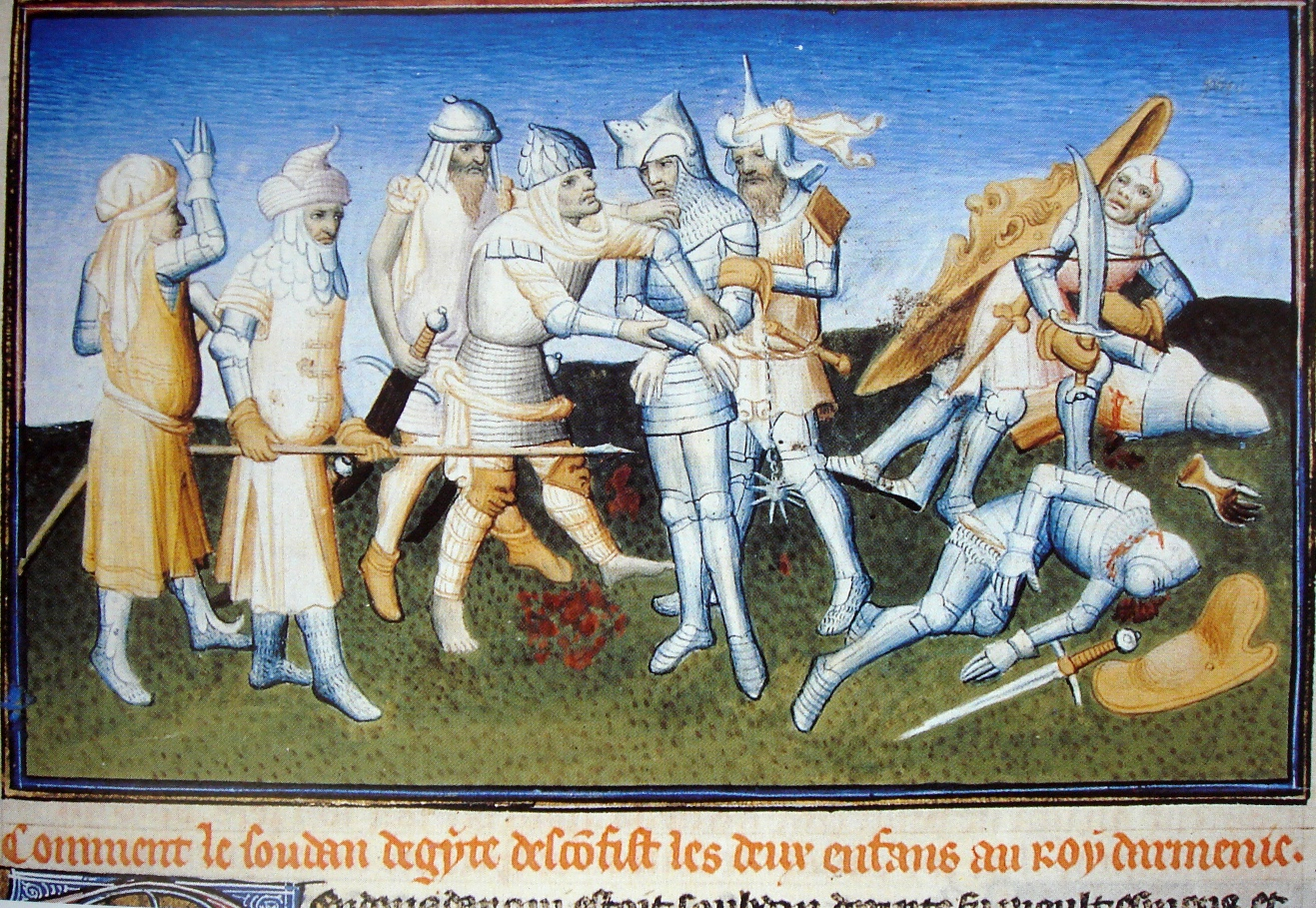
Detail from The Travels of Marco Polo, c. 1410, showing an armored "Mamluk" with a short, spiked flail tucked into his belt

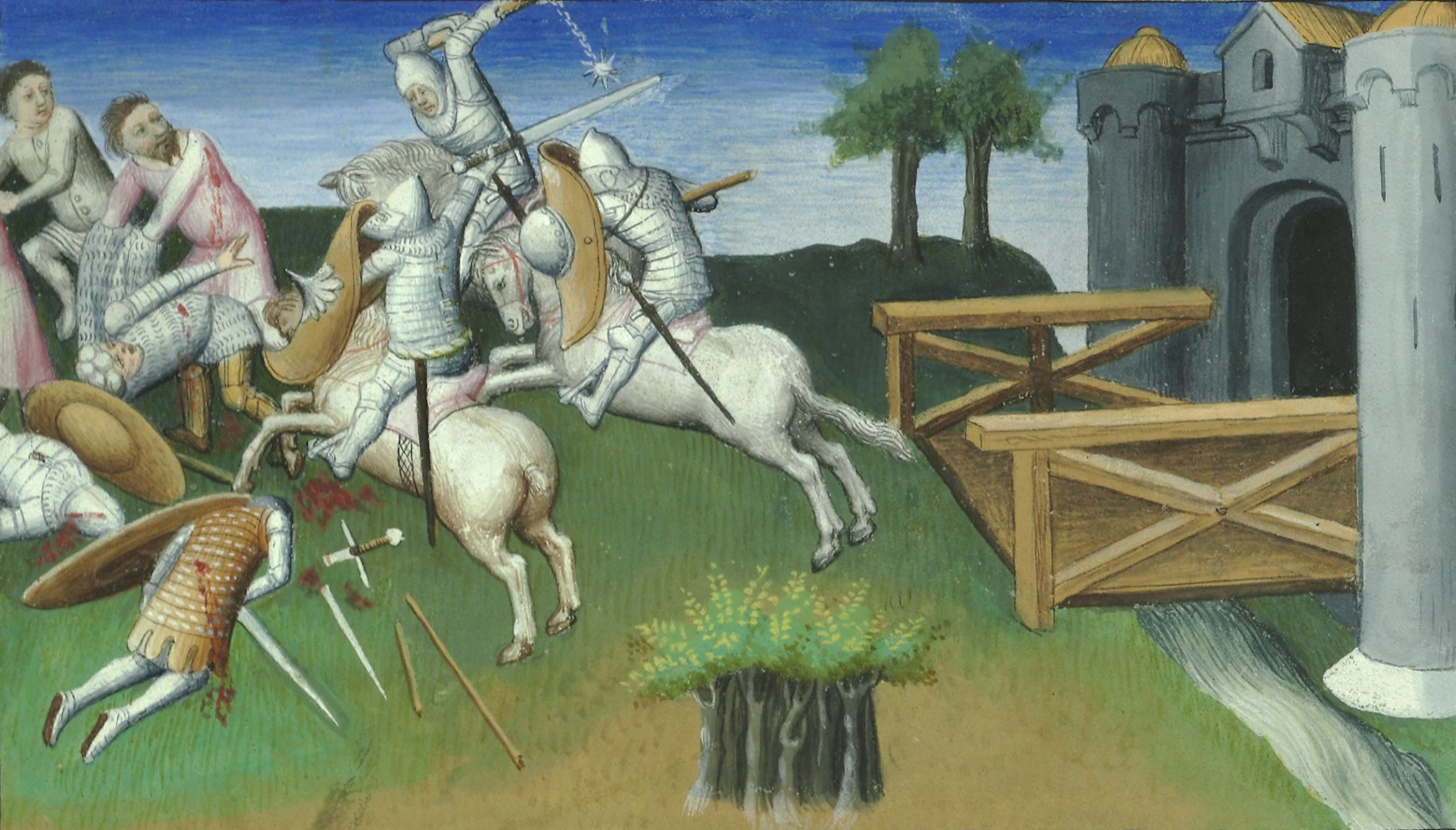
Detail from The Travels of Marco Polo, c. 1410, showing a horseman using a spiked flail with both hands to strike an adversary

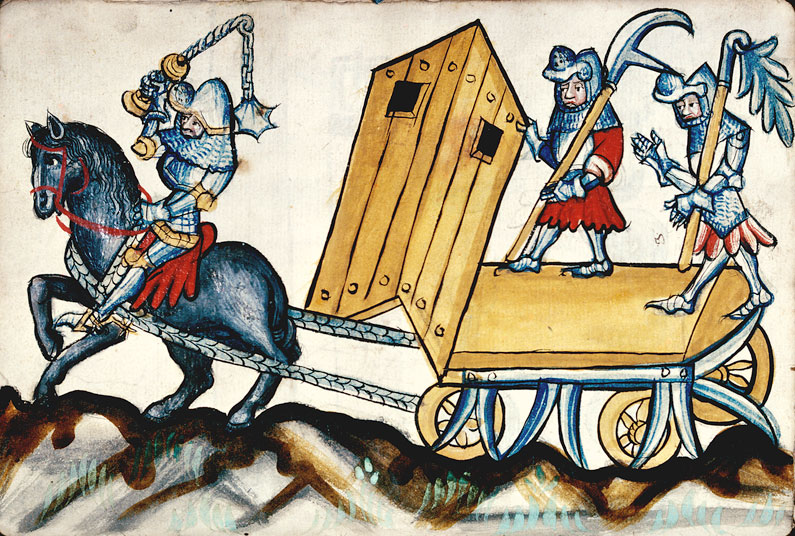
Illustration from Bellifortis showing a mounted knight with a short flail, circa 1450

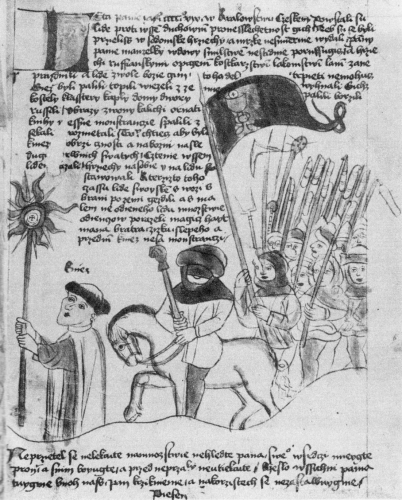
Hussite troops with flails on the march

== See also ==
- Mace (bludgeon)
- Threshal
- Meteor hammer
