= Ivan Petrovich Fyodorov-Chelyadnin =

Russian politician and statesman (1500s–1568)

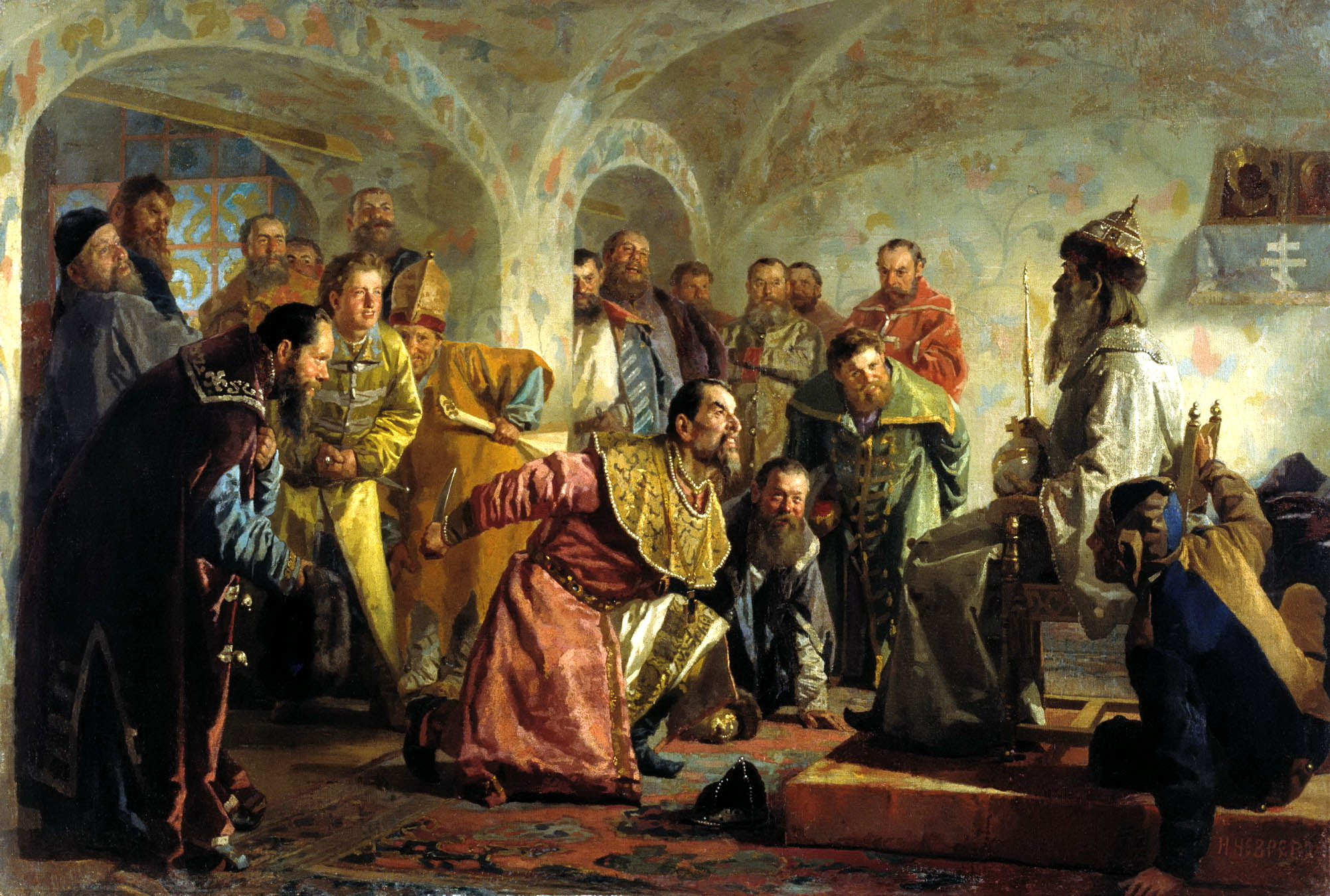
Oprichniki, by Nikolai Nevrev, shows the mock coronation of Ivan Fyodorov-Chelyadnin (enthroned) accused of conspiracy, before his execution. The man with the knife is Ivan the Terrible himself: according to Alexander Guagnini, Ivan stabbed Fyodorov-Chelyadnin in the heart, and the oprichniks finished him off.

Ivan Petrovich Fyodorov-Chelyadnin (Иван Петрович Фёдоров-Челяднин, 1500s, Moscow – September 11, 1568) was a Russian politician and statesman, voivode, governor, equerry, boyar, master of the horse, and one of the leaders of the zemshchina during the oprichnina under Ivan the Terrible. He was an influential and wealthy boyar known for his honesty and was a prominent member of the influential Chelyadnin family.

== Life ==
Ivan Petrovich was born in the 1500s, the only son of the okolnichy Pyotr Fyodorovich Davydov-Khromoy and the daughter of Prince Semyon Romanovich Yaroslavsky.

He became a boyar in 1550, de facto head of the zemshchina ("land") part of the Boyar Duma, and held the rank of konyushy (Master of the Horse).

During the oprichnina, Tsar Ivan the Terrible was told that the elderly boyar had supposedly intended to overthrow him from the throne and become tsar himself.

He was executed on September 11, 1568. Alexander Guagnini reported that Ivan ordered him to put on royal clothes, put him on the throne, bowed, and then stabbed him in the heart, after which the oprichniks attacked and stabbed the body of Fedorov-Chelyadnin. After his death, all the vast Chelyadnin estates were looted and destroyed, and all close relatives and servants of Ivan Petrovich were killed.
