= Chelyadnins =

Russian boyar family

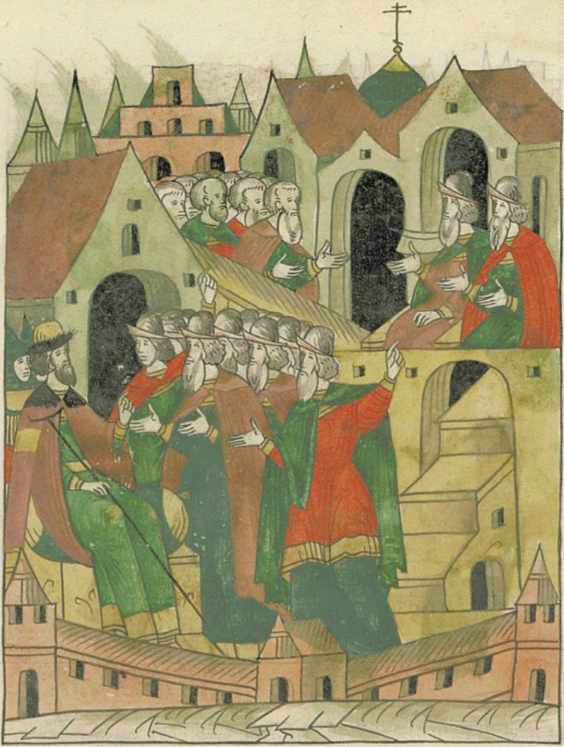
Vasily III appoints Grigory Fedorovich Chelyadin-Davydov and Ivan Andreevich Chelyadnin as governors of Pskov, miniature from the Illustrated Chronicle of Ivan the Terrible

The Chelyadnin family (Russian: Челяднины, romanized: Chelyadniny) were an old and influential Russian boyar family who served the grand princes of Moscow in high and influential positions. They were descended from Ratsha, court servant (tiun) to Prince Vsevolod II of Kiev.

== History ==
=== Ancestry ===
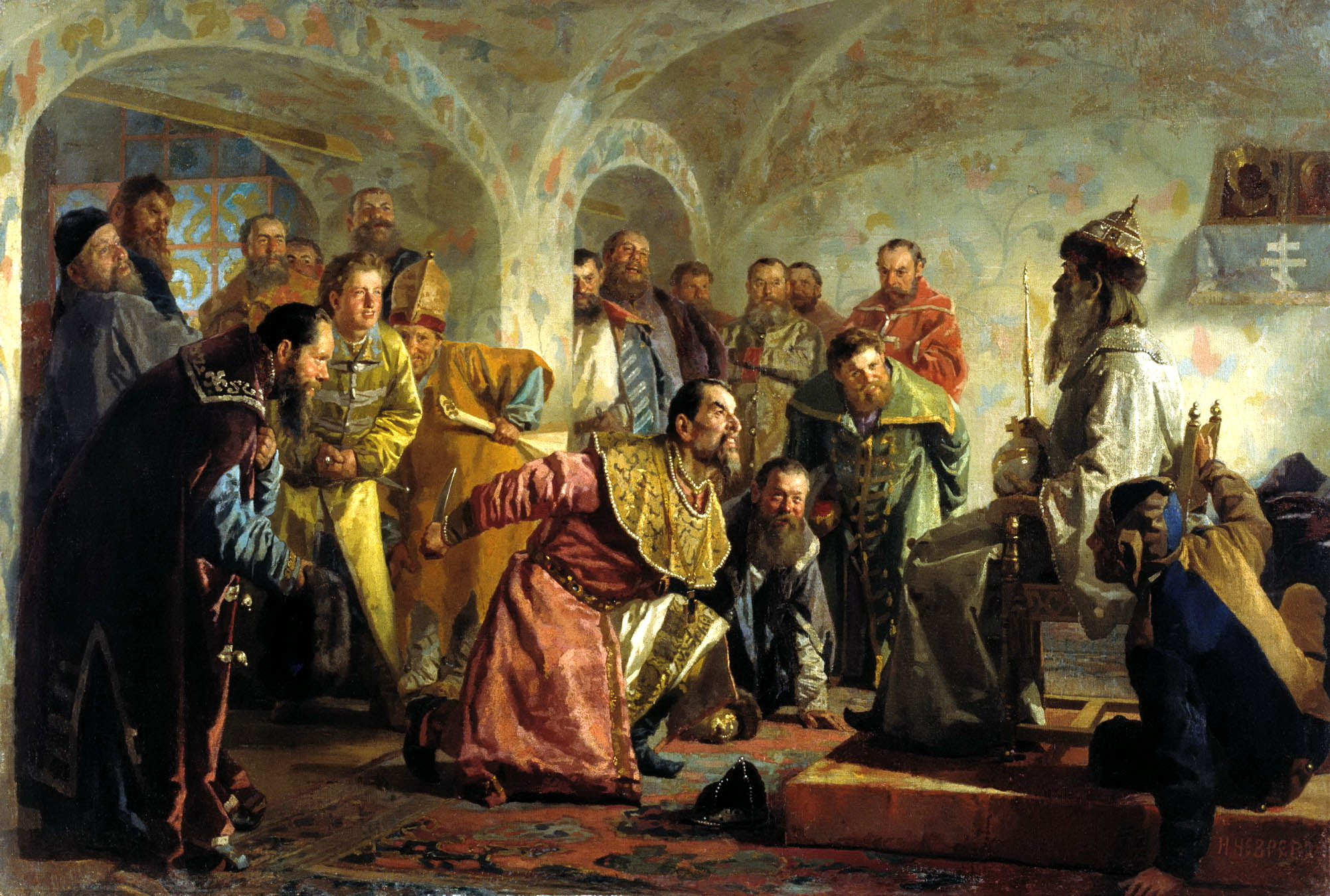
The Oprichniks by Nikolai Nevrev shows the execution of Ivan Petrovich Chelyadnin (right) after a mock coronation organized by Ivan IV (1870s)

The Chelyadnins were descended from Ratsha, court servant (tiun) to Prince Vsevolod II of Kiev and the oppressive manager of serfs in Kiev. Several other Russian noble families are also descended from Ratsha, including the Pushkin, Aminoff, Buturlin, Kuritsyn, Kamensky families.

Ratsha's great-grandson Gavrila Aleksich was a boyar under the famed Alexander Nevsky and played an important role in the Battle of Neva. Gavrila Aleksich's son Akinf Gavrilovich the Great was a boyar under two Grand Princes of Vladimir, Andrey of Gorodets and Mikhail of Tver. The founder of the Chelyadnin family was Mikhail Andreevich Chelyadnya, son of Akinf and seventh-generation descendant of Ratsha.

=== Rise to power ===
Mikhail Andreevich Chelyadnya's son, Ivan Mikhailovich Chelyadnin, married Princess Elena Yuryevna Patrikeeva, grand daughter of Grand Prince Vasily I. In the 14th, 15th and early 16th centuries, the Chelyadnins often occupied one of the highest positions at court. They often became boyars, bypassing the stage of okolnichiy. The family went extinct in the 16th century when Tsar Ivan the Terrible executed Ivan Petrovich Fedorov-Chelyadnin, an influential boyar belonging to the Daydov-Khromy branch of the Chelyadnin family. Subsequently, the oprichniks under the tsar looted and thoroughly destroyed all the vast Chelyadnin estates, and all close relatives and servants of Ivan Petrovich were brutally killed.

== Notable Chelyadnins ==
- Boyar Andrey Fyodorovich Chelyadnin (died 1503), the first of Chelyadnins who gained the title of konyushy, governor (наместник, namestnik) of Novgorod. He was the commander-in-chief during the Russo-Swedish War (1495–1497). In 1500, he defeated the Lithuanians at the Lovat River and captured the city of Toropets.
- Boyar Ivan Andreyevich Chelyadnin (died 1514), konyushy (Master of the Horse) at the court of Vasili III of Russia, voyevoda (1508–1509). He took part in a number of battles with the Grand Duchy of Lithuania, after the defeat of Russia at the Battle of Orsha he was taken into captivity and died in a prison in Vilnius.
- Boyar Ivan Petrovich Fedorov-Chelyadnin (1500s – September 11, 1568), became boyar in 1550, de facto head of the Zemsky Sobor Boyar Duma and held the rank of konyushy (Master of the Horse). He was an influential and wealthy boyar known for his honesty. Tsar Ivan the Terrible was told that the elderly boyar had supposedly intended to overthrow him from the throne and become tsar himself. Alexander Guagnini reported that Ivan ordered him to put on royal clothes, put him on the throne, bowed, and then stabbed him in the heart, after which the Oprichniks attacked and stabbed the body of Fedorov-Chelyadnin. After his death, all the vast Chelyadnin estates were looted and destroyed, and all close relatives and servants of Ivan Petrovich were killed.
