= Threshal =

A threshal was a type of two handed medieval flail, looking rather like a larger version of the more well-known nunchaku. Considered a peasant's weapon, it was nonetheless capable of defeating many types of armor, as illustrated in contemporary manuscripts.
