= Battle of Orsha =

Part of the fourth Muscovite–Lithuanian War (1514)

- Part of Lithuanian–Muscovite War (1512–1522)
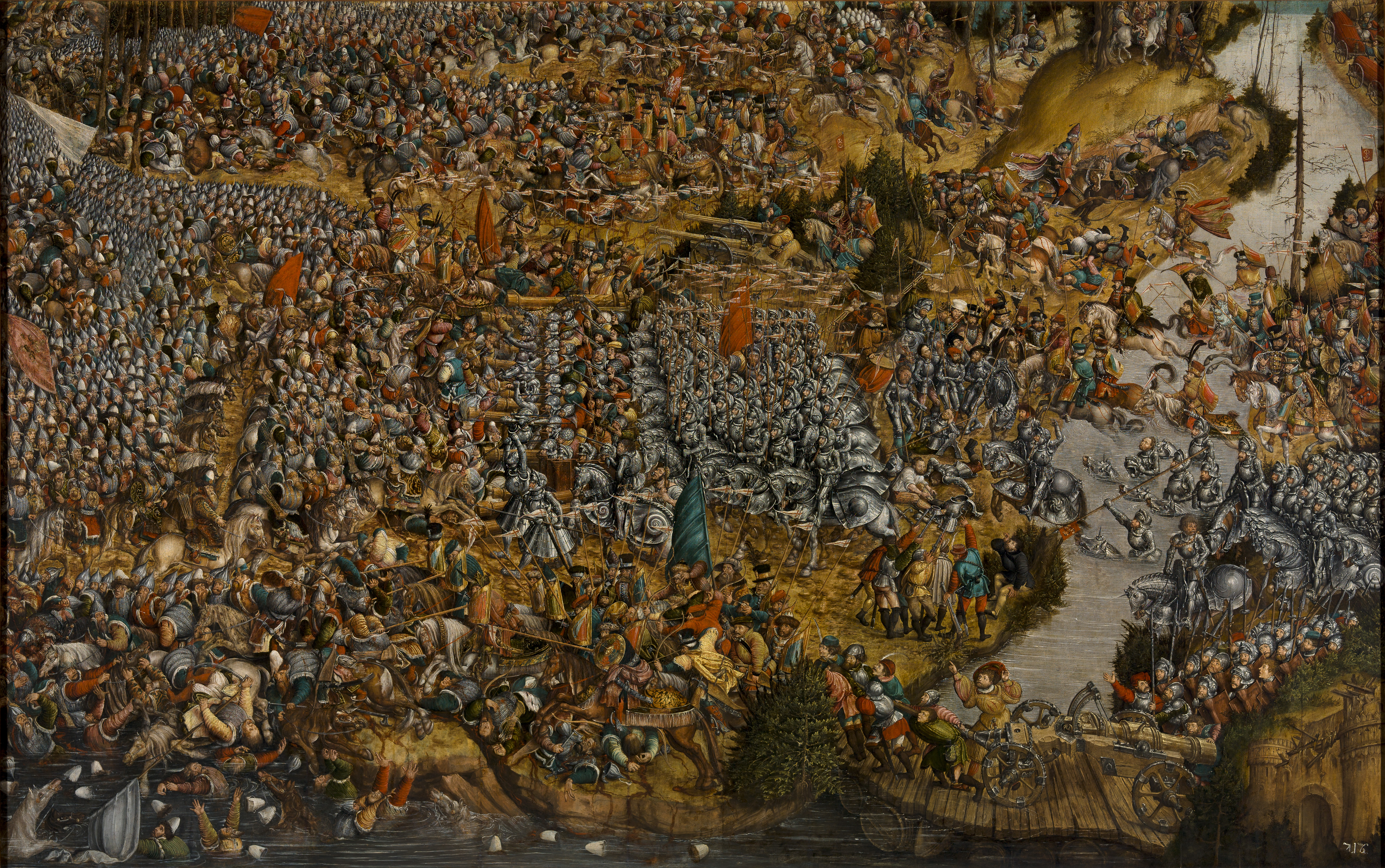
- Battle of Orsha painting attributed to Hans Krell
Date	8 September 1514
Location	Orsha, Grand Duchy of Lithuania, present-day Belarus 54°30′N 30°23′E
Result	Polish–Lithuanian victory

Belligerents
Grand Duchy of Lithuania; Kingdom of Poland	Grand Duchy of Moscow

Commanders and leaders
Konstanty Ostrogski; Jerzy Radziwiłł; Janusz Świerczowski; Wojciech Sampoliński	Ivan Chelyadnin (POW)

Strength
12,000 to 35,000 (Note: Different estimates: 12,000 men; 25,000 men; 35,000 men.)	11,000 to 80,000 (Note: Different estimates: 11,000 men; (previously 12,000); 35,000–40,000 men; (perhaps exaggerated); 80,000 men. («exaggerated»))

Casualties and losses
Unknown	13,000–40,000 dead and wounded (?)
- Location within Belarus

The Battle of Orsha (Belarusian: Bitva pad Voršaj, Polish: Bitwa pod Orszą, Lithuanian: Oršos mūšis), was fought on 8 September 1514, between the allied forces of the Grand Duchy of Lithuania and the Crown of the Kingdom of Poland, under the command of Lithuanian Grand Hetman Konstanty Ostrogski; and the army of the Grand Duchy of Moscow under Konyushy Ivan Chelyadnin and Kniaz Mikhail Bulgakov-Golitsa. The Battle of Orsha was part of a long series of Muscovite–Lithuanian Wars conducted by Muscovite rulers striving to gather all the former Kievan Rus' lands under their rule.

According to Rerum Moscoviticarum Commentarii by Sigismund von Herberstein, the primary source for information on the battle, the much smaller army of Lithuania–Poland (under 30,000 men) defeated a force of 80,000 Muscovite soldiers, capturing their camp and commander. These numbers and proportions have been disputed by some modern historians.

== Eve of battle ==
At the end of 1512, the Grand Duchy of Moscow began a new war for the Grand Duchy of Lithuania's Ruthenian lands in present-day Belarus, Ukraine and Russia. Albrecht I, Grand Master of the Teutonic Knights, rebelled and refused to give a vassal pledge to Sigismund I the Old of Poland-Lithuania, as required by the Second Peace of Thorn (1466). Albrecht I was supported by Maximilian I, Holy Roman Emperor.

The fortress of Smolensk was then the easternmost outpost of the Grand Duchy of Lithuania and one of the most important strongholds guarding it from the east. It repelled several Muscovite attacks, but in July 1514 a Muscovite army besieged and finally captured it. Spurred on by this initial success, the Grand Prince of Moscow Vasili III ordered his forces farther into present-day Belarus, occupying the towns of Krichev, Mstislavl, and Dubrovna.

Meanwhile, Sigismund the Old gathered some 35,000 troops, most of whom (57%) were Poles, for war with his eastern neighbor. His army was inferior in numbers, but consisted mostly of well-trained cavalry.

The regular Polish army was commanded by Janusz Świerczowski. It was the largest one that the Crown had hitherto put in the field. Wojciech Sampoliński was in charge of the private Polish detachments and household troops. The Lithuanian landed service (some 15,000 soldiers) was led by Grand Hetman Konstanty Ostrogski and Field Hetman Jerzy Radziwiłł. The Lithuanian-Polish forces included 32,500 cavalry and 3,000 mercenary infantry. Sigismund left 4,000–5,000 men in the town of Barysau, while the main force, placed under the command of Hetman Konstanty Ostrogski and around 30,000 strong, moved on to face the Muscovites.

At the end of August, several skirmishes took place at the crossings of the Berezina, Bobr, and Drut Rivers, but the Muscovite army avoided a major confrontation.

Suffering negligible losses, the Muscovites advanced to the area between Orsha and Dubrovno on the Krapivna River, where they set up camp. Ivan Chelyadnin, confident that the Lithuanian–Polish forces would have to cross one of the two bridges on the Dnieper River, split his own forces to guard those crossings. However, Ostrogski's army crossed the river farther north via two pontoon bridges. On the night of 7 September, the Lithuanian-Polish army began preparations for a final battle with the Muscovites. Hetman Konstantyn Ostrogski placed most of his 16,000 horses from the Grand Duchy in the center, while most of the Polish infantry and the auxiliary troops manned the flanks. The Bohemian and Silesian infantry were deployed in the center of the line, in front of the reserves comprising Lithuanian and Polish cavalry.

=== Size of the Muscovite army ===
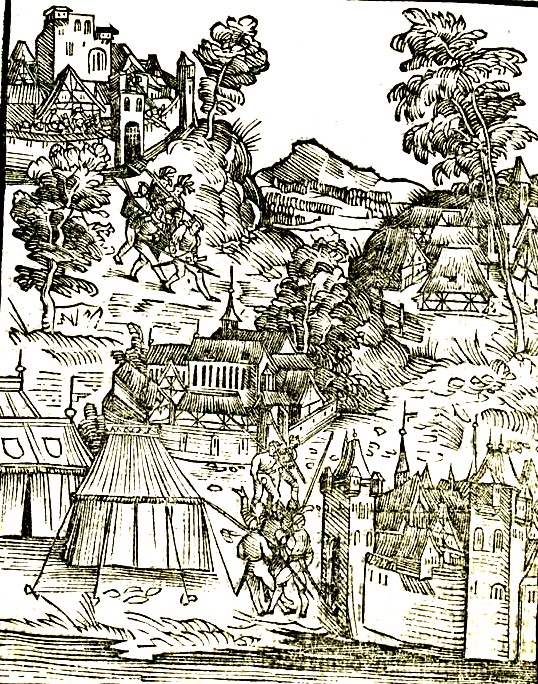
Russo-Polish war, image from Jacob Piso Die Schlacht von dem Kunig von Poln und mit dem Moscowiter, 1514

The size of the Muscovite army remains an unsolved question. Narrative Lithuanian sources generally give large numbers. King Sigismund wrote to Pope Leo X about a "horde of Muscovites" which consisted of 80,000 men. Sigismund also claimed that his army had killed 30,000 Muscovites and taken prisoner 46 commanders and 1,500 nobles. Extant Polish and Lithuanian documents, however, list all captured nobles by name; only 611 men in all. The Polish historian Bohun considers it improvident to rely on what he terms "propaganda data" given by Sigismund. According to the Sigismund description of the disposition of the Russian troops, each regiment outnumbers even modern divisions. Gembarowicz (another Polish researcher) is of the opinion that the Muscovite army was about 40,000 strong. It also remains unclear why – if the figure of 70,000–80,000 men is to be trusted – King Sigismund (who knew about this superiority of the Muscovite army from Mikhail Glinsky's letters) kept a personal guard of about 5,000 men (about 15% of his army) in reserve, without sending them into the battle. The Muscovite chronicles (Novgorodian and Sophian codexes) claim a Lithuanian numerical superiority.

The Russian historian A. Lobin tried to calculate the size of the Muscovite army at Orsha based on the mobilisation capacities of the towns which had to send townspeople for military service. It is known that except for Boyar sons of the sovereign's regiment, the army consisted of people from at least 14 towns: Novgorod, Pskov, Velikie Luki, Kostroma, Murom, Borovsk, Tver, Volok, Roslavl, Vyazma, Pereyaslavl, Kolomna, Yaroslavl, and Starodub. Based on figures from the well-documented Polotsk campaign of 1563, the author gives the following estimates: 400–500 Tatars, 200 boyar sons of the sovereign's regiment, 3,000 Novgorodian and Pskovians, and about 3,600 representatives of other towns, altogether about 7,200 noblemen. Once servants are included, the overall size of the Muscovite army could be 13,000–15,000 men. Considering the losses during the campaign, the level of desertion which is documented in the sources and the number of soldiers left as a garrison in Smolensk; the number of Muscovite troops present at Orsha could have been as low as about 12,000 men. This calculation method has been backed by Brian Davies (University of Texas at San Antonio), and Russian historians N. Smirnov, A. Pankov, O. Kurbatov, М. Krom, and V. Penskoy. An earlier estimate also noted that at the beginning of the 16th century, the Russia could not even gather 40,000 in its ranks. Vitaly Penskoi analyzing the structure of the Russian army, also came to the conclusion that in the largest military campaigns under Vasily III, Muscovites could not have more than 20,000.

== Battle ==
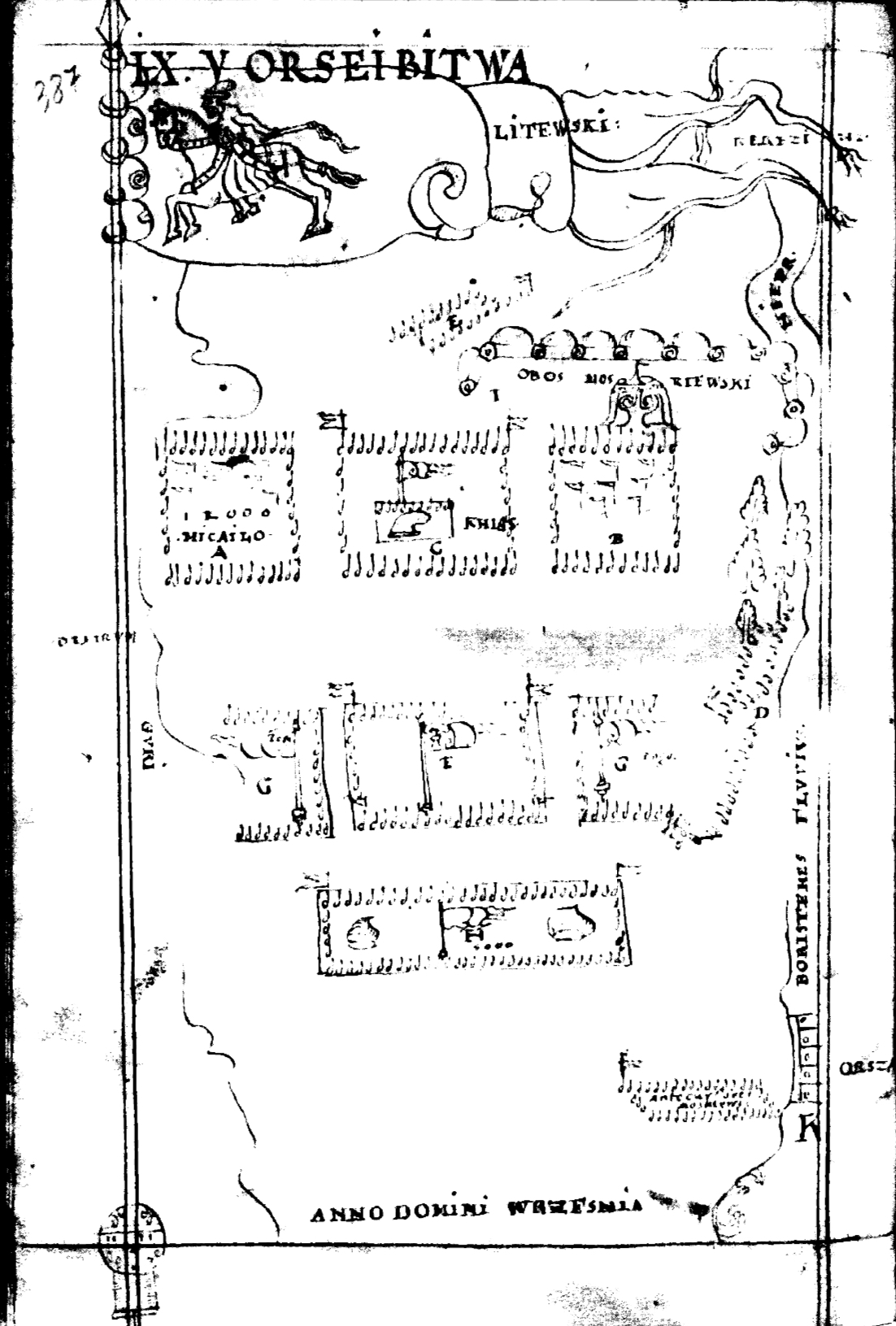
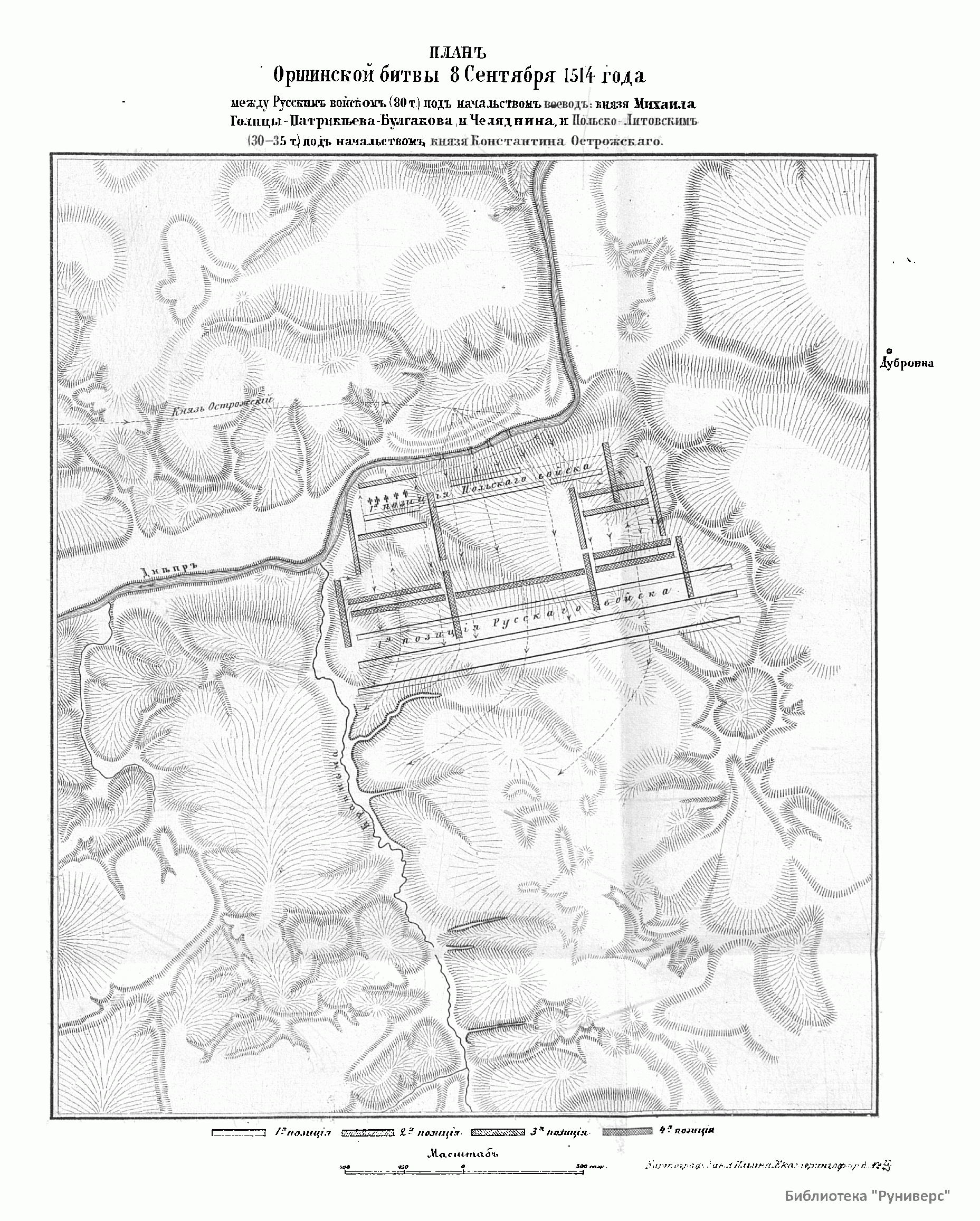
The battle plan drawn up by Stanisław Sarnicki, c. middle of the XVI century and battle plan drawn up in 1878 by the Russian military historian Nikolai Sergeevich Golitsyn

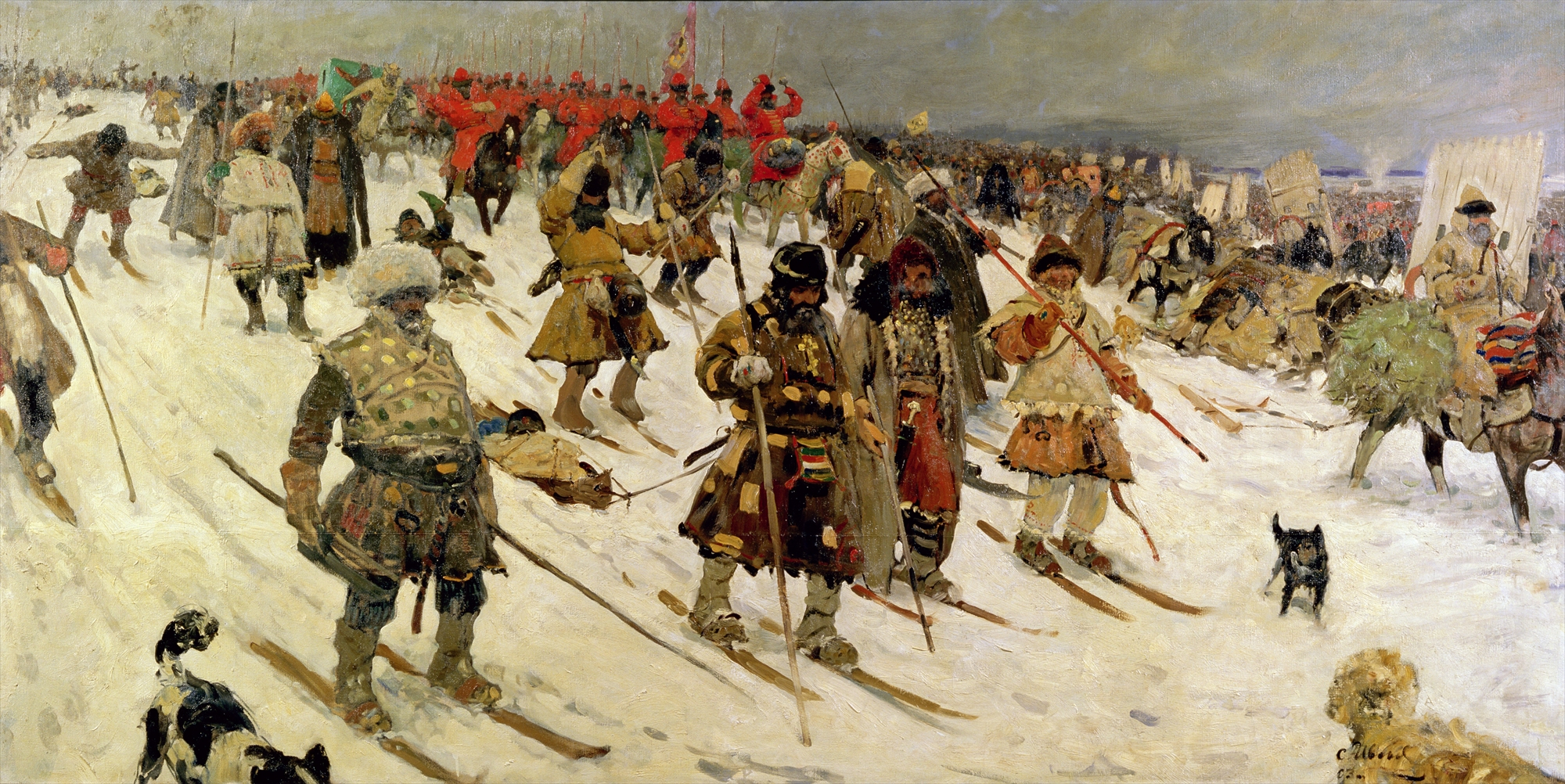
Russian campaign against the Lithuanians (oil on canvas by Sergey Ivanov, 1903).

On 8 September, shortly after dawn, Ivan Chelyadnin gave the order to attack. The Muscovite forces attempted to outflank the Lithuanians and Poles by attacking their flanks, which were manned by Polish, Lithuanian light hussar, and Tartar troops. One of the pincers of the attack was commanded by Chelyadnin personally, while the other was led by Prince Bulgakov-Golitsa. The initial attack failed, and the Muscovites withdrew toward their starting positions. Chelyadnin was still confident that the odds, almost 3:1 in his favor, would give him the victory. However, preoccupied with his own wing of the Muscovite forces, he lost track of the other sectors and failed to coordinate a defense against the counterattack by the Lithuanian light and Polish heavy cavalry, which until then had been kept in reserve.

The Lithuanian and Polish light horse and Tartars attacked the overstretched center of the Muscovite lines in an attempt to split them. At the crucial moment the Polish cavalry seemed to waver, then went into retreat. The Muscovites pursued with all their cavalry reserves. The Lithuanian Tartars and Polish cavalry, after retreating for several minutes under chase from the Russians, suddenly turned to the sides. The Muscovite cavalry now found themselves confronted by artillery concealed in the forest. From both sides, Lithuanian forces appeared and proceeded to surround the Muscovites. Ivan Chelyadnin sounded retreat, which soon became somewhat panicked. The Muscovite forces were pursued by the army of the Grand Duchy of Lithuania for five kilometres.

The Muscovite defeat is often attributed to repeated failures by Ivan Chelyadnin and Mikhail Golitsa to coordinate their operations.

Sigismund von Herberstein reported that 40,000 Muscovites were killed. According to accounts in Polish chronicles, 30,000 Russians were killed and an additional 3,000 were taken captive, including Ivan Chelyadnin and eight other commanders. The forces of the Grand Duchy of Lithuania seized the Muscovite camp and all 300 cannons. Upset at word of the massive defeat, Grand Prince Vasili III allegedly remarked that "the prisoners [were] as useful as the dead".

== Aftermath ==
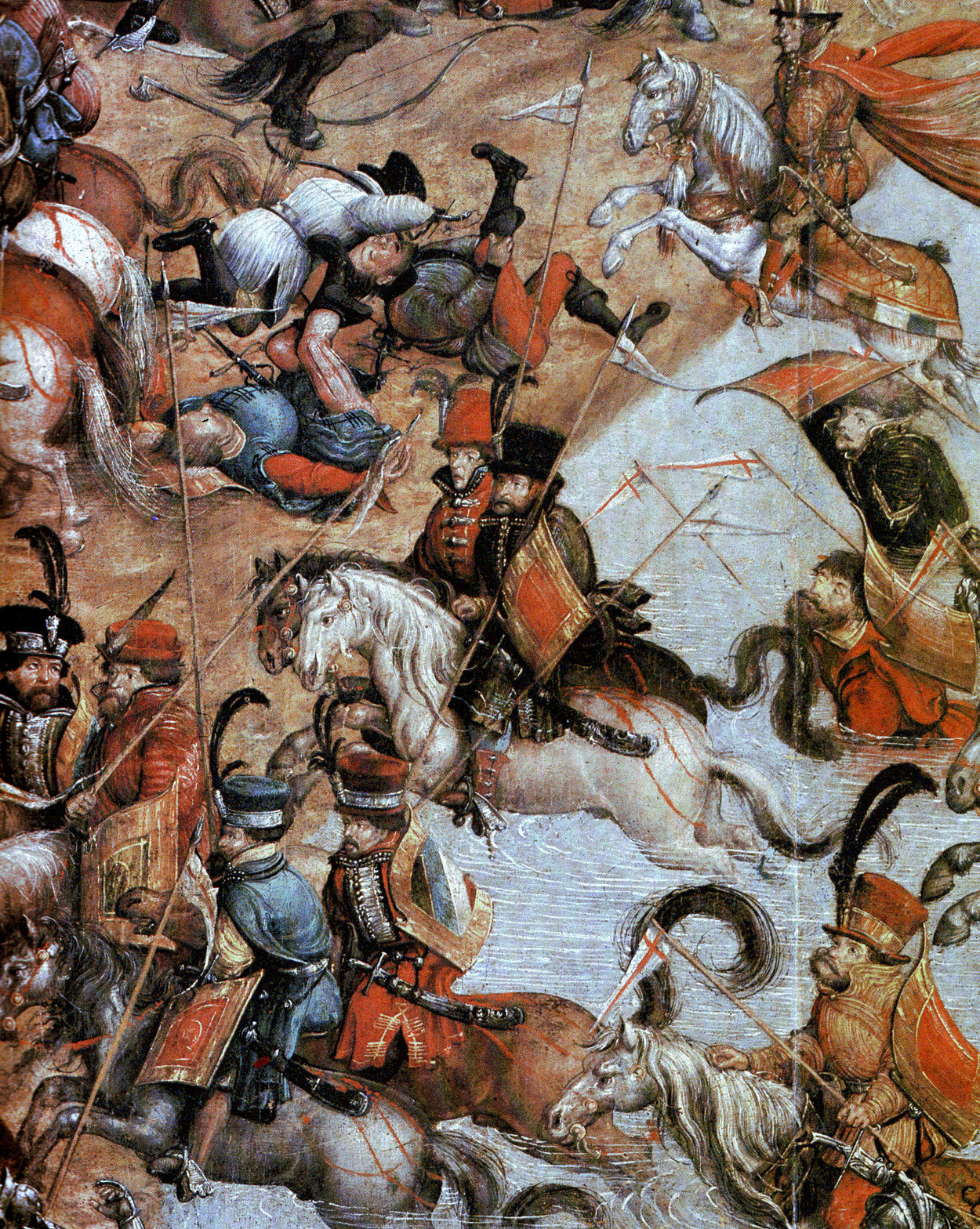
Hussars during the Battle of Orsha (1514)

Ostrogski's forces continued their pursuit of the routed Russian army and retook most of the previously captured strongholds, including Mstislavl and Krychev, and the advancement of the Russians was stopped for four years. However, the Lithuanian and Polish forces were too exhausted to besiege Smolensk before the winter. This meant that Ostrogski did not reach the gates of Smolensk until late September, giving Vasili III enough time to prepare defense.

In December, Hetman Konstanty Ostrogski triumphantly entered Vilnius. To commemorate the victory, two Orthodox churches were erected: the Church of the Holy Trinity and the Church of Saint Nicholas, which remain among the most impressive examples of Eastern Orthodox Church architecture in Lithuania. Immediately after the victory, the Polish–Lithuanian state started to exploit the battle for its propaganda aimed at other nations in Europe, with the intent of improving the image of Poland-Lithuania abroad. Several panegyrical accounts of the battle were sent to Rome. "The Polish message was similar to Bomhover's: the Muscovites are not Christians; they are cruel and barbaric; they are Asians and not Europeans; they are in league with Turks and the Tatars to destroy Christendom".

Impressed by the scope of the Lithuanian and Polish victory, Maximilian I, Holy Roman Emperor, started peace negotiations with the Jagiellons in Vienna. On 22 July 1515, final agreements for peace were made and the broad coalition against Lithuania and Poland ceased.

The war between the Grand Duchy of Lithuania and Grand Duchy of Moscow lasted until 1520. In 1522 a peace was signed, under the terms of which Lithuania was forced to cede to Moscow about a quarter of its possessions within the lands of the former Kievan Rus', including Smolensk. The latter city was not retaken until almost a century later, in 1611. After the peace agreement of 1522, the Grand Duchy of Lithuania tried to attack Moscow one more time, but major military conflicts were settled for around 40 years.

== Modern times ==
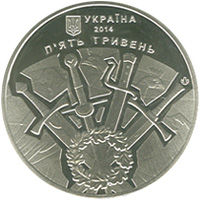

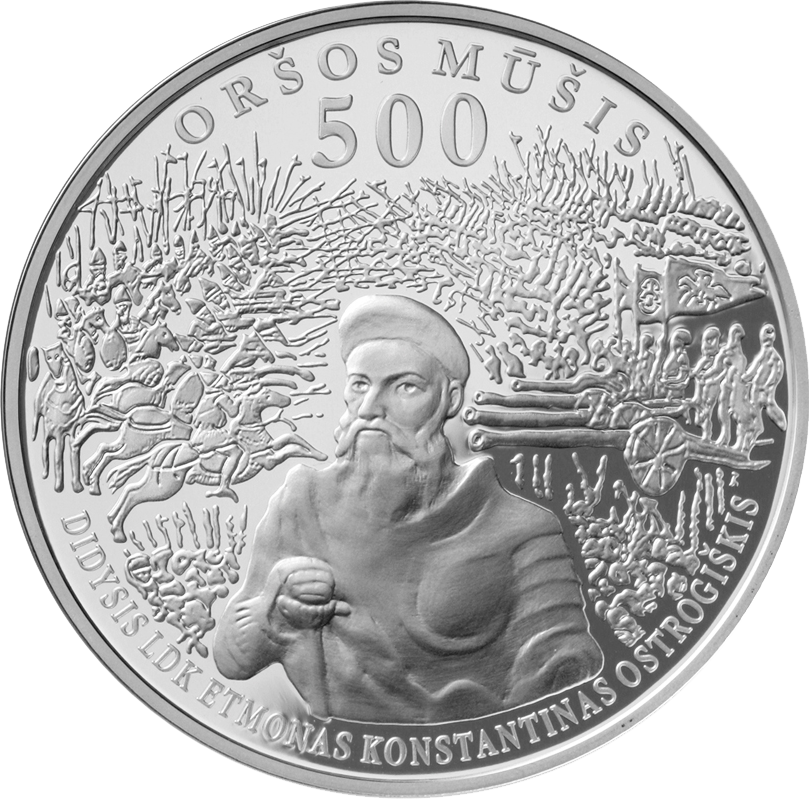
Commemorative coins by Ukraine and Lithuania.

The battle is regarded by some Belarusians as a symbol of national revival, with many seeing it as a Day of Belarusian Military Glory. On 8 September 1992, the 478th anniversary of the battle, cadets from Minsk Higher Military Engineering School and the Minsk Higher Military Command School (now the unified Military Academy of Belarus) took the first military oath of allegiance to the Armed Forces of Belarus, with their induction ceremony being held on Independence Square in the presence of defense minister Pavel Pavlovich Kozlovsky. Subsequently, however, as a result of increasing ties to Russia, the regime of President Alexander Lukashenko actively suppressed celebration of the battle. In September 2005, four members of the Belarusian National Front opposition were each fined almost 4,000,000 Belarusian rubles (roughly €1,500) for celebrating the 491st anniversary of the battle.

Ukraine has public celebrations of the Battle of Orsha, as an important victory, within the wider history of Ukrainian-Russian conflicts. On October 14, 2014, the National Bank of Ukraine presented a commemorative coin on the occasion of the 500th anniversary of the Battle of Orsha. There is Orsha Victory Street in Rivne.

At the Tomb of the Unknown Soldier, Warsaw, the Battle of Orsha is commemorated by the inscription "ORSZA 8 IX 1514".

In Lithuania, the Battle of Orsha is commemorated as well by the Lithuanian Ministry of Defense and the Lithuanian government every year with concerts, conferences and military parades.

During the Russo-Ukrainian War, Belarusian volunteers created the Special Unit “1514” which is part of the Main Directorate of Intelligence of the Ministry of Defence of Ukraine. Formally, the unit was established in 2024, on the Day of Belarusian Military Glory (September 8), the anniversary of the Battle of Orsha.

== Popular culture ==
On the BBC television program Being Human, Hal Yorke was made a vampire after the Battle of Orsha.

== Legacy ==
In 1514, in appreciation for the victory in the battle, Konstanty Ostrogski built the Church and monastery of Holy Trinity in Vilnius.
