= Battle of Orsha (painting) =

Painting attributed to Lucas Cranach the Elder

- Bitwa pod Orszą (Polish)
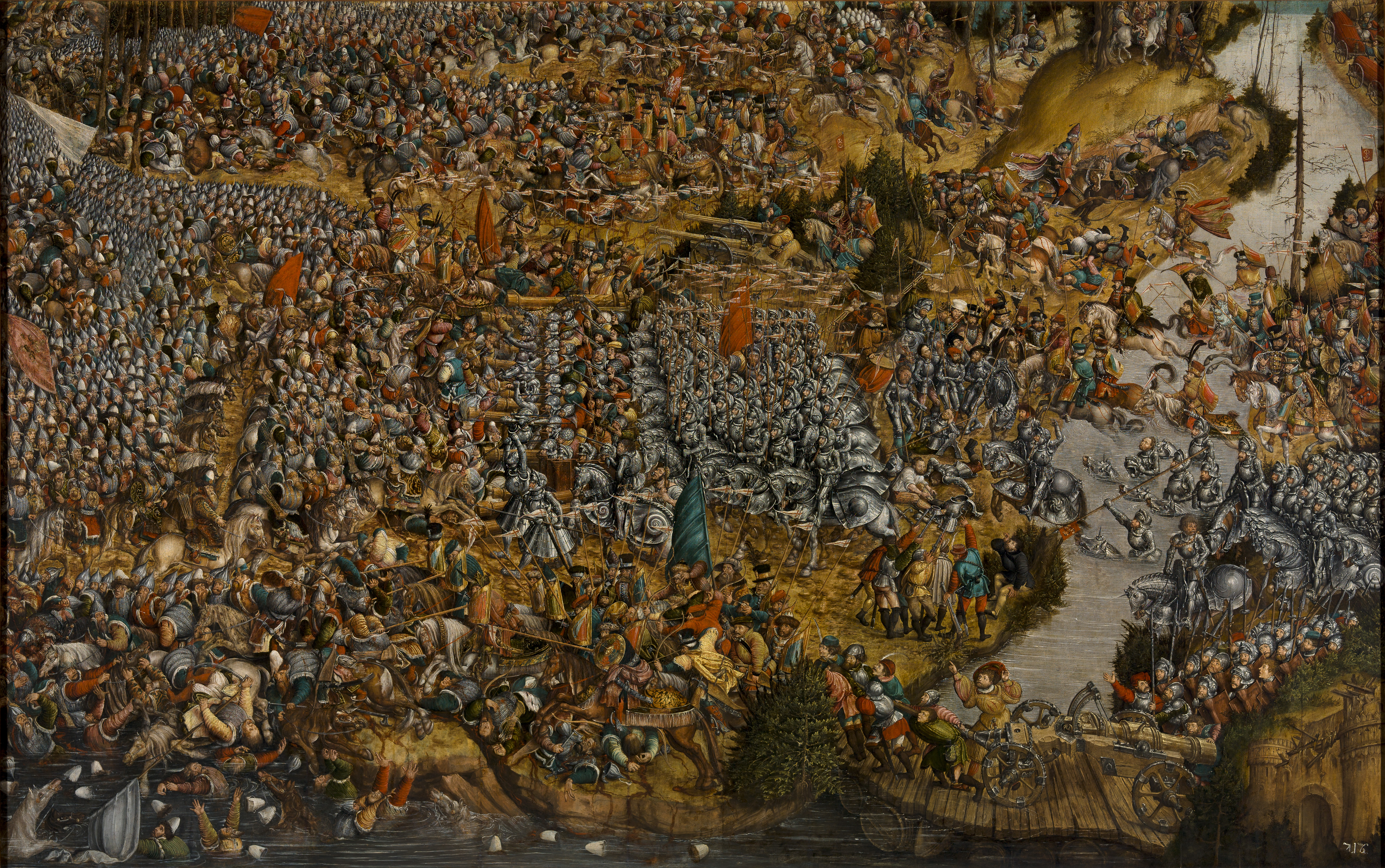
- Artist: circle of Lucas Cranach the Elder
- Year: 1525–1535
- Medium: tempera on wood
- Dimensions: 165 cm × 262 cm (65 in × 103 in)
- Location: National Museum, Warsaw

The Battle of Orsha (Polish: Bitwa pod Orszą) is a painting of the Battle of Orsha, which was fought on 8 September 1514, between the allied forces of the Grand Duchy of Lithuania and the Kingdom of Poland (to the right hand side of the painting) against the Vasili III's army of the Grand Duchy of Moscow (left) as part of the Muscovite–Lithuanian Wars.

== Description ==
The painting, the only work of its kind in Polish Renaissance, is currently kept in the National Museum in Warsaw. The anonymous "Master of the Battle of Orsha" was probably one of the painters-cartographers in the employ of the Jagiellonian kings. Judging from his technique and style he was most likely an artist from the circle of Lucas Cranach the Elder. Meticulous details suggest the artist was himself a witness to the battle. There is a self-portrait of the artist as an unarmed figure in German costume (near bottom, right of centre), sitting on a tree stump on the bank of the Dnieper river, looking at the battle, while framing his fingers to compose a view.

According to one hypothesis the author of the picture was the German artist Hans Krell, court painter of Louis II of Hungary.

== Analysis ==
The image shows a bird's eye view of several stages of the battle; the same characters appearing in different places - Hetman Konstanty Ostrogski is shown three times. Details of equipment and weapons and portraits of the commanders have been recreated realistically and with great accuracy, showing, among others, such scenes as emptying water from armor after crossing the river. Some scenes verge on the grotesque; others emphasize the cruelty of the battle.

The image has not been preserved in its entirety. Careful analysis suggests that it was initially taller and included the horizon. Its asymmetrical composition suggests that 1/5 of the width was trimmed from the left. The two conflicting columns of heavy infantry, presumably once the center of the image, are now shifted to the left. The painting was most likely created somewhere between 1525 and 1535.

== Bibliography ==
- Malarstwo Polskie, red. Janusz Fogler, Wydawnictwa Artystyczne i Filmowe, Warszawa 1997
- National Museum in Warsaw, Arkady, Warsaw, 1990, ISBN 83-213-3308-7
- 'Bitwa pod Orszą'. „Rzeczpospolita”. Cykl dodatków: „Zwycięstwa Oręża Polskiego” nr 4/20, 25 marca 2006. Warszawa.
- Zdzisław Żygulski jun – Polska. Broń wodzów i żołnierzy, Kraków 1998.
