= Hans Krell =

German artist (c. 1490 – 1565/1586)

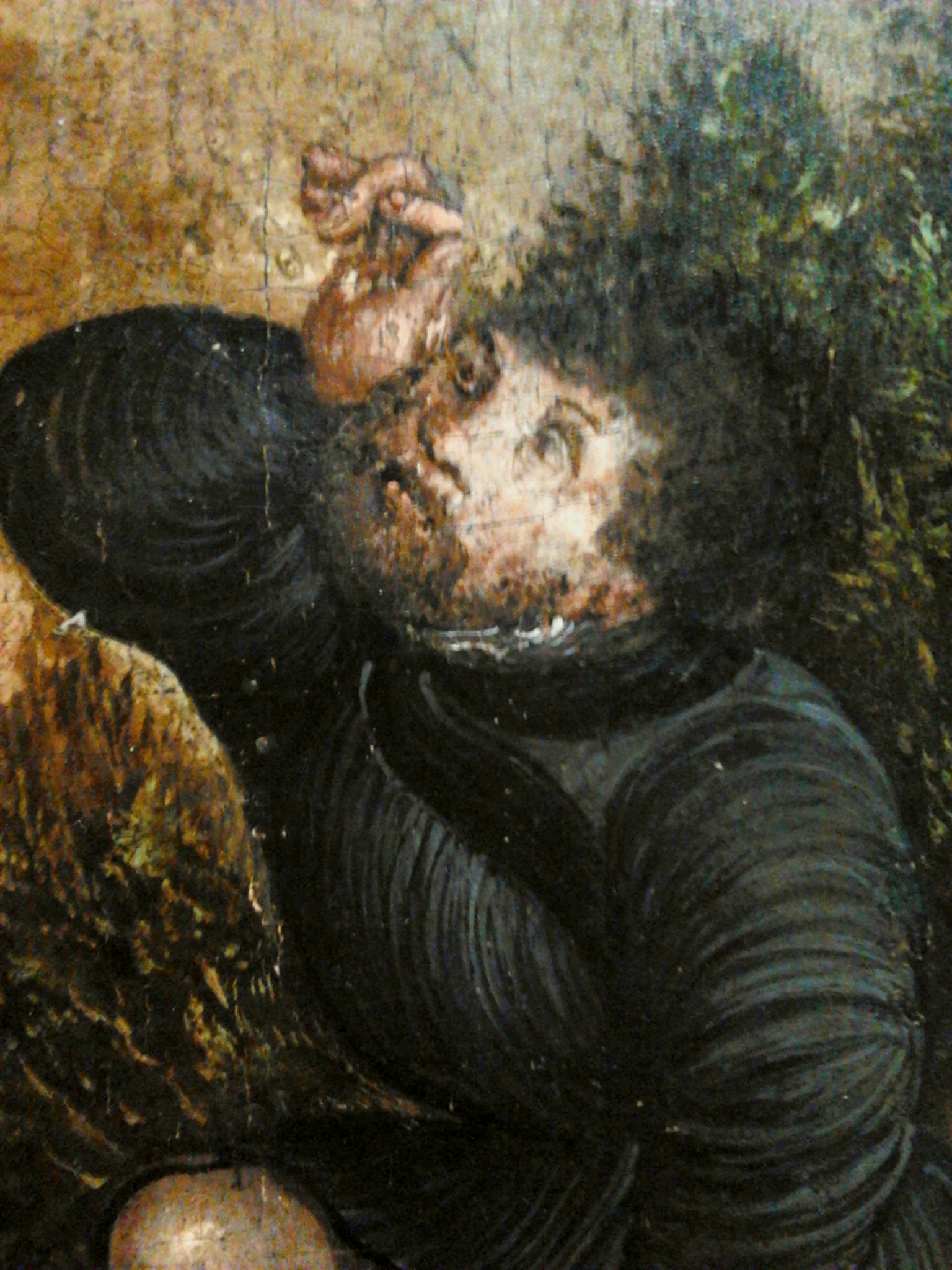
- Presumed self-portrait in the Battle of Orsha
- Born: c. 1490; Crailsheim
- Died: 1565 or 1586; Leipzig
- Known for: Painting
- Notable work: Battle of Orsha
- Movement: Renaissance

Hans Krell (c. 1490 – 1565 or 1586), also Krehl ou Kreil, was a German painter of the Renaissance, mainly known as a portrait painter. He is thought to have been born in Crailsheim or Ansbach, and died in Leipzig.

Hans Krell started his career as court painter of George the Pious, Margrave of Brandenburg-Ansbach in Ansbach. He then entered into the service of King Louis II of Hungary in Prague and Buda, where he was employed as court portraitist in the years 1522–1526. He is later recorded in Leipzig (from 1531) and in Freiberg in Saxony (since 1534). Krell was known as the Fürstenmaler (Painter of Princes) in service of the German Princes – Albrecht of Brandenburg-Ansbach, Duke in Prussia, Hedwig Jagiellon, Electress of Brandenburg and the Elector Augustus of Saxony. His paintings of Saxon princes in the ceremonial hall and the council chamber of the Old Town Hall in Leipzig were continually being completed.

Hans Krell is credited by Dieter Koepplin as the author of a painting (Battle of Orsha) long associated with Lucas Cranach the Elder, painted around 1524–1530. The painting, today displayed in the National Museum in Warsaw, depicts the battle which was fought on 8 September 1514 between the allied forces of the Grand Duchy of Lithuania and the Kingdom of Poland on one side and the army of the Grand Duchy of Moscow on the other. According to specialists, the author must have taken part in the battle himself due to his high knowledge on the subject. Krell's connections with the Jagiellonian dynasty patrons (including king of Hungary) and rulers of Prussia makes this attribution probable. The author of the painting portraited himself in the painting observing the battle and gazing upwards through intertwined fingers.
