= Kenji Kurosaki =

Japanese combat sports instructor

Kenji Kurosaki (黒崎健時)
- Born: March 15, 1930 (age 96); Kuwamura, Shimotsuga District, Tochigi Prefecture
- Other names: Akira Kurosaki (黒崎 明), Taketoki (たけとき)
- Style: Kickboxing, Kyokushin Karate, Goju-ryu, Shinkakutō-jutsu
- Teachers: Mas Oyama, Gogen Yamaguchi
- Rank: 10th Dan Black Belt (1992) in Kyokushin Karate

Other information
- Notable students: Japan: Toshio Fujiwara, Terutomo Yamazaki, Yoshiji Soeno, Akio Fujihara, Tadashi Nakamura, Shigeru Oyama, Hatsuo Royama, Hideyuki Ashihara, Yasuo Tabata; Abroad: Jan Plas, Biban Palik, Jan Kallenbach, Loek Hollander, Willie Williams (karateka), Patrick Brizon, Gerald Finot, Christian Tissier

Kenji Kurosaki (黒崎健時, Kurosaki Kenji; born March 15, 1930) is a Japanese martial arts instructor, specializing in full-contact karate and kickboxing. He is a 10th dan black belt (1992) in Kyokushin Karate and operates various martial schools. He is most well known as a pioneer of full-contact karate and kickboxing in both Japan and the Netherlands.

== Biography ==
=== Early kyokushin ===
Kurosaki began studying Goju-Ryu Karate in 1951 at the "Asakusa-dojo" under Gogen Yamaguchi where Masutatsu Oyama also trained. After Mas Oyama left in 1953 to open the Oyama Dojo in Ikebukuro, Kurosaki became one of the instructors alongside Masashi Ishibashi and Eiji Yasuda. Among the students who trained there during this time, Shigeru Oyama, Hideyuki Ashihara, Hatsuo Royama, Terutomo Yamazaki and others were among them. In 1958 he opened the Narimasu branch of the Oyama Dojo, which at that time was the only branch of Oyama Karate in Japan.

=== Muay Thai ===
In the spring of 1963, Oyama Dojo was challenged in Muay Thai by Osamu Noguchi. Oyama directed Kurosaki and chose Hirofumi Okada, Yasuhiko Oyama, Tadashi Nakamura, and Akio Fujihira, to enter the challenge. Five people, including Kurosaki, held a one-month training camp in Kinugawa from August to prepare for the October expedition to Thailand. However, the expedition was postponed to December and then re-postponed in January 1964, so Okada and Yasuhiko declined the expedition.

In February 1964, Kurosaki led Nakamura and Fujihira on an expedition to Thailand. At first, Kurosaki had no plans to participate, but he was asked to because there were so few Kyokushin fighters with them. In a fight held at Lumpinee Stadium, Kurosaki fought against Muay Thai fighter Rawee Dechechai in Muay Thai Rules. Kurosaki would lose this fight by KO from a elbow strike by Rawee. Kurosaki would later attribute his loss to being unclear with Muay Thai rules and not being accustomed of fighting with boxing gloves. Of the three bouts, Kyokushin's Nakamura and Fujihira won two and thus, Kyokushin was declared the victor of the challenge.

=== Mid 1960s ===
In April 1964, Oyama Dojo was named the Kyokushin Scholarship Foundation and was renovated into the Kyokushin Kaikan of the International Karatedo Federation. In June of the same year, the headquarters dojo was completed in Nishiikebukuro, Toshima-ku, Tokyo. In addition to the people who provided financial support for the construction, Nakamura testified that "Kurosaki Shihan's contribution was very large."

Kurosaki taught Kyokushin in Hawaii in 1965 before going to the Netherlands in 1965. During this time, Kurosaki and his friend Jon Bluming contributed to the spread of Kyokushin in Europe.

In 1966, he stayed in the Netherlands for 11 months at the invitation of John Bluming, who later became the first chairman of the Kyokushin Kaikan Europe region, and provided guidance. His most notable students at the time were Jan Kallenbach, Loek Hollander and Henri Seriese.

=== Kickboxing gyms ===
Following the 1964 fight in Thailand, Kurosaki started contesting the kyokushin's direction in combat realness, with Oyama still insisting to keep Kyokushin as "the strongest karate" and to practice it bare-fisted with no facial contact. Kurosaki would leave the Kyokushin-kaikan organization, sometime in March 1969.

Subsequently, Kurosaki founded the Mejiro Gym, dedicated for Japanese-style kickboxing. Kurosaki began pursuing kickboxing and joined in co-operation with the All Japan Kickboxing Association. He would train various Japanese kickboxing talents, most notably Toshio Fujiwara, who joined the Mejiro Gym in July 1969. In 1978, Fujiwara won the title of Rajadamnern and became the first foreigner to win the Muay Thai championship, which Kurosaki had longed for.

After that, he withdrew from the All Japan Kickboxing Association and established the Japan Martial Arts Federation and the Kurosaki Dojo. At that time, there were two groups, the Japan Kickboxing Association and the All Japan Kickboxing Association. The reasons for launching the new group, was that he saw the two other groups as old-fashioned, that failed take any measures for the declining popularity of kickboxing in Japan.

Kurosaki was not bound by the framework of the All Japan Kickboxing Association, and was actively involved in matchmaking with American professional karate such as WKA and PKA, which had emerged at that time, and different types of martial arts such as muay thai.

Kurosaki was also involved in promoting the match between Willie Williams vs Antonio Inoki with Ikki Kajiwara. He has also appeared in a series of documentary martial arts films produced by Kajiwara Ikki, and has appeared and depicted in the graphic novels "Karate Baka Ichidai" and "Square Jungle" under his real name.

=== Recent activities ===
From 2002 to 2003, K-1 fighter Taishin Kohiruimaki was part of the Kurosaki Dojo. At Kurosaki Mixed Martial Arts School, Kurosaki also provided guidance on strengthening the physical strength of non-martial arts athletes, such as bicycle races.

Since 2019, there's been a lot conflicting information regarding Kurosaki's health. In August 2020, Toshio Fujiwara released a video confirming that Kurosaki is still alive, but also confirming that Kurosaki is hospitalized due to an unspecified illness.

== Books and Writing ==
- "Hisshi no chikara hisshi no kokoro" ("必死の力・必死の心) Sports Life, (1979), ISBN 4879480045
- "Zoku hisshi no chikara hisshi no kokoro" (続必死の力・必死の心) Sports Life (1981)
- "Jiko bōei no hijutsu" (自己防衛の秘術) Sports Life
- "Samurai e no dengon" (サムライへの伝言) Bungeisha (2004), ISBN 483557396X
