= Masashi Ishibashi (actor) =

Japanese actor and martial artist

Masashi Ishibashi 石橋雅史
- Born: Masashi Ishibashi; January 4, 1933; Hualien Port, Japanese Taiwan (present-day Taiwan)
- Died: December 19, 2018 (aged 85); Yanagawa, Fukuoka Prefecture, Japan
- Other name: Milton Ishibashi (Note: As credited in Return of the Street Fighter and Black Panther Bitch M.)
- Education: Nihon University
- Occupations: Actor; martial artist
- Years active: 1950s–2018
- Martial arts career
- Style: Kyokushin karate; Gōjū-ryū karate; judo; kendo
- Rank: 7th dan black belt (Kyokushin)

Other information
- Notable students: Sonny Chiba; Terutomo Yamazaki; Jon Bluming; Hideyuki Ashihara; Yoshiji Soeno; Shigeru Oyama

Japanese name
- Kanji: 石橋雅史
- Hiragana: いしばし まさし
- Katakana: イ シバシ マサシ
Transcriptions
- Romanization: Ishibashi Masashi
- Website: Blog

Masashi Ishibashi (石橋雅史, Ishibashi Masashi; January 4, 1933 – December 19, 2018), was a Japanese karateka and actor. A 7th dan black belt in Kyokushin Karate, he was an early instructor of the style under Mas Oyama, with notable students including Sonny Chiba and Terutomo Yamazaki.

As an actor, Ishibashi had an extensive career in Japanese television, where was famous as portraying villains in historical dramas. He had significant presence in television productions like NHK's Taiga drama series, The Unfettered Shogun, and the Hissatsu series. He also had frequent roles in various 1970s and 1980s tokusatsu series, most notably in Super Sentai series. His movie career was mostly specialized in martial arts movies and crime dramas, including many with his longtime student Chiba.

== Early life ==
Born in Hualien City, in Taiwan during the Japanese rule His father was a professional soldier and he has two younger brothers. At the end of the war, he repatriated to Yanagawa, Fukuoka, and lived there until he graduated from Fukuoka Prefectural Denshukan High School. Later, he graduated from Nihon University College of Art, Department of Drama.

In 1956, at the same time as graduating from university, he joined a Bungakuza-affiliated Theater Institute and went on to become an actor. Eventually, he became a member of the Bungakuza theater company proper, but he also worked as greengrocer, a pachinko parlor clerk, and a laborer on the side. As Ishibashi had been practicing Goju-Ryu style of Karate since he was a school student, he was hired by Mas Oyama as a Karate Instructor for his Oyama Dojo and the Kyokushin Kaikan, earning his living expenses that way as well.

== Martial arts ==
Ishibashi learned judo and kendo from his father from an early age. While attending Denshukan High School, he practiced judo, and after entering the theater department of Nihon University College of Art, he began attending the Goju-ryu dojo in Asakusa. Eventually, Ishibashi became the captain of the Goju-ryu Karatedo club at the university. and after graduating, he was a martial arts teacher of the same institution.

At the request of Mas Oyama, who is also a senior in Goju-ryu Karate, Ishibashi worked as an instructor at the Oyama Dojo and Kyokushin Kaikan during his early days as an actor. At the time, his Goju-Ryu community disallowed him from teaching Karate at the Oyama's Dojo, because he taught a style independent of Goju-Ryu. But due to Oyama persistently asking Ishibashi, he relented and agreed to teach at Oyama Dojo.

Ishibashi is one of Oyama's so-called legends and was often asked to show the "10-yen coin bending" at Oyama's Karate demonstrations. Ishibashi was also present in witnessing Mas Oyama fighting the 550 kg bull at the Denen Coliseum in November 1956. He is also a "kotei" of Oyama. Many of Oyama's students under the guidance of Ishibashi later played the role furthering the International Karate Organization.

Ishibashi had coached Terutomo Yamazaki, whom Ishibashi expected to be talented when Yamazaki was still a white belt, and taught him one-on-one after the joint training. In his blog, Ishibashi recounts how Yamazaki, who had won the 1st Open Tournament All Japan Karatedo Championships held by the International Karate Organization for the first time, would first tell this to Ishibashi to his joy. Their master-student relationship continued, with Yamazaki, who was adviser to a wine company, often gifting wine to Ishibashi.

According to Hatsuo Royama; "[Ishibashi] was tall and very flexible, slim and not a [typical karateka], but could easily lift 70-80kg on a bench press." He recounted how Ishibashi managed to completely swarm him in training. Royama also tells that Ishibashi would instruct errors in approach to Kumite.

Shigeru Oyama said of Ishibashi that "There were three great seniors (Note: These three being Eiji Yasuda (who specialized in lightning fast kicks), Kenji Kurosaki (who specialized in harsh kumite) and Ishibashi, who is described as "brilliant and gentle expert of kumite.") at the time [of the conception of Kyokushin]. Mr. Ishibashi was the kindest of [Mas Oyama's] seniors."

Other students include Hirofumi Okada, Kazuhisa Watanabe, Jun Fujimaki, Yasuhiko Oyama, Jon Bluming, Sonny Chiba, Yuzo Goda, Tadashi Nakamura, Shigeo Kato, Hideyuki Ashihara, Yoshiji Soeno and others.

== Acting ==
On the stage, he had roles in the plays Sono hito o shirazu (その人を知らず) (1957) and honō no hito (炎の人) (1958). After leaving Bungakuza in 1964, he became active in TV dramas and movies.

Most of Ishibashi's acting career is focused on Television work. His first movie role was in the 1970 Toho film Yajūtoshi (野獣都市), based on the 1961 novel by Haruhiko Oyabu. He had his career breakthrough in the 1973 action film Bodigaado Kiba: Hissatsu sankaku tobi starring Sonny Chiba, playing an antagonist role against the main character.

He had a starring role in the 1974 Sonny Chiba vehicle The Street Fighter. He had been chosen to play the role of "Tateki Shikenbaru", (Note: Also known as "Junjo" in the English dub for western releases.) by the recommendation of Sonny Chiba, based on the experiences in the prior movie. He was also stunt coordinator directing all the fighting scenes at the request of the leading Chiba and director Shigehiro Ozawa.

Since then, Ishibashi was active in Toei Company's Martial arts films and action dramas during the 1970s. Ishibashi was also Sonny Chiba's Kyokushin instructor at the Oyama Dojo. Ishibashi also taught karate at the Japan Action Club founded by Chiba.

Ishibashi had appeared in the TBS jidaigeki period drama Mito Kōmon 46 times in guest roles. He had also acted in multiple roles in Tokusatsu action series Super Sentai, having had roles in J.A.K.Q. Dengekitai, Battle Fever J, Kagaku Sentai Dynaman, Kousoku Sentai Turboranger, Chōjin Sentai Jetman and Juken Sentai Gekiranger: Nei-Nei! Hou-Hou! Hong Kong Decisive Battle.

In 1978, Ishibashi appeared in Fuji TV's Ōrusutā kazoku taikō utagassen, where his personality was evaluated by Kinichi Hagimoto, who also hosted the show. In 1979, he made a regular appearance in the TV Asashi's variety show Kinchan'nodokomadeyaruno!, where he played the role of a neighbor of the house where Kinichi Hagimoto's character lives.

== Personal life ==
He married in 1963 and has a son. His own blog states that he is practicing his karate while also training his juniors, and often posted his own haikus.

=== Death ===
Ishibashi died in Yanagawa, Fukuoka on December 19, 2018, at the age of 85.

== Filmography ==
=== Theater ===
- Sono hito o shirazu (その人を知らず) (1957, Theater Company Bungakuza)
- Honō no hito (炎の人) (1958, Theater Company Bungakuza)
- Udzuki koi monogatari (雨月恋物語) (1991, Shinbashi Embujo)

=== Television ===
- NHK Taiga drama series:
  - Akō Rōshi (1964)
  - Kunitori Monogatari (1973)
  - Katsu Kaishū (1974)
  - Kashin (1977) – as "Kijima Matabei"
  - Dokuganryū Masamune (1987)
  - Hachidai Shogun Yoshimune (1995) – as "Masatake Inao"
  - Aoi (2000) – as "Hirohashi Kanekatsu"
  - Musashi (武蔵 MUSASHI) – as "Tadashi Okubo"
- Karate Fuunji (1964–1965, NTV / Shimadzu Pro)
- Maguma taishi (CX / P Productions) – 2 episodes (10 and 44)
- Tokubetsu kidō sōsa-tai – (NET / Toei Company) – 12 episode appearances (1967–1976)
- Key Hunter (TBS / Toei) – 3 appearances (1968, 1971)
- Daichūshingura – Episode 7 "The Great Decision" (1971, NET / Mifune Productions) – as Sanroku Mishima
- Ōedo Sōsamō (12ch / Nikkatsu → Mifune Productions) – 6 appearances between 1971 and 1991
- Kamen Rider series (MBS / Toei)
  - Kamen Rider – Episode 4 "Man-Eating Sarracenian" (1971) --Combatant No.3
  - Kamen Rider Super-1 – Episode 1 "The Transformation of a Remodeled Human for the Planet", Episode 2 "The Time for Fighting Comes! The Technique is Akashin Kobayashiken" (1980) – Gosuke Saruwatari (Fire Kong Humanoid)
  - Kamen Rider BLACK – Episode 40 "Secret of the Karate Master" (1988) --Saburo Takasugi
- Return of Ultraman – Episode 9 "Monster Island SOS" (1971, TBS / Tsuburaya Productions) --Kondo Team Leader
- Ronin of the Wilderness (NET / Mifune Productions) – 1st Series Episode 42 (1972) and 2nd Series Episode 32 (1974)
- Hissatsu series (ABC / Shochiku)
  - Hissatsu Shiokiya Kagyō – Episode 19 "I saw the hardships of one-stroke enlightenment" (1975)
  - Hissatsu Shigotonin (1980)
    - Episode 39 "Comb Technique Slash! Lullaby"—Genjuro Hashizume
    - Episode 73 "Disruption Technique Gekijou! Straight Stab"—Tamura Kakunosuke
  - Shin Hissatsu Shigotonin
    - Episode 5 "Main Water Part-time Job" (1981) --A Buddhist Monk
    - Episode 33 "Patience with the Main Water Coarse Food" (1982) – Norizen Okuhira
  - Shin hissatsushimainin Episode 7 "Shell Bushi is a Child Abandoned Song" (1982) --Ben
  - Hissatsu Watashinin Episode 9 "I will hand it over at an unrelated graveyard" (1983) --Genba Akamatsu
  - Hissatsu Shigoton V Episode 12 "Fighting the Dragon Ninja of the Braid Shop" (1985)-Hajime Tsukumo
  - Hissastu Hashikaketo Episode 7 "Exploring the Red Plum of Yushima Tenjin" (1985)
  - Hissatsu Shigoto V. Fierce Fighting Episode 32 "Blacksmith's Government, Fighting Underwater" (1986) --Katsuzo
  - Hissatsu Shigoton V. Fengyun Ryutora Hen Episode 15 "Edo Daibutsu Karakuri Open Eyes" (1987) --Genda
  - Hissatsu Shigoton Clash! Episode 19 "Hide, Become a Model for a Female Painter" (1992) --Mamoru Takizawa
- Super Sentai series:
  - J.A.K.Q. Dengekitai (1977) – Iron Claw
  - Battle Fever J (1979) – Bengal Tiger / Nenriki Phantom Voice (Episode 4), 2nd Commander Hedder/ Header Phantom Voice (Episode 51)
  - Kagaku Sentai Dynaman (1983) – General Kar
  - Kousoku Sentai Turboranger (1989) – Dr. Rehda
  - Chojin Sentai Jetman – Episode 27 "The Great Escape from Makai" (1991) --Yasumoto Shonin
- The Unfettered Shogun series: (ANB / Toei)
  - Series 1 – 5 appearances
  - Series 2 – 7 appearances
  - Series 3 – 5 appearances
  - Series 4 – 2 appearances
  - Series 5 – Episode 37 "My Love" (1994) --Sotayu Shibanuma
  - Series 6 – Episode 42 "Mother with Golden Jizo" (1995) --Anzai Hyogo Head
- Momotarō-zamurai (NTV / Toei) – 7 appearances between 1979 and 1981
- The Super Girl – Episode 13 "Female Dragon, Crimson's Deadly Fist" (1979, 12ch / Toei) – as Masaru Tendo
- G-Men '75 (TBS / Toei) – 2 appearances in 1979 and 1980
- Nashonaru gekijō – various appearances between 1979 and 2000
- Miracle Girl (1980, 12ch / Toei) – two appearances
- Shin Edo no Kaze – Episode 24 "Hagure Yado Hostage Incident" (1980, CX / Toho)
- Shadow Warriors (KTV / Toei)
  - Shadow Warriors II – Episode 7 "Phantom! Scorpion Raid" (1981) --Rando Sakai
  - Shadow Warriors IV – Episode 8 "A Flock of Prostitutes Glittering in the Darkness" (1985) --Tokubei Matsunoya
- Tokusō Saizensen – Episode 230 "Strip Scandal!" (1981, ANB / Toei) --Genji Yamamoto
- Metal Hero Series (ANB / Toei)
  - Space Sheriff Gavan – Episode 3 "It's hard! Stop Dr. Kuroboshi's Bem project" (1982) --Dr. Kuroboshi
  - Super Rescue Solbrain – Episode 25 "Respond to the Giant Mothership" (1991) --Professor Shimano
- Seibu Keisatsu (ANB / Ishihara Pro)
  - Part 2 – 2 appearances
  - Part 3 – 3 appearances
- The Hangman series – multiple appearances
- Choshichiro Edo Nikki – Series 1 Episode 23 "Dawn Song" (1984, NTV / Union Motion Picture) – as "Toda"
- Nebula Mask Machineman – Episode 24 "Confrontation! Ninja Thief" (1984, NTV / Toei) --Hantayu Hyakuchi
- Taiyō ni Hoero! – Episode 695 "Woman in a Red Dress" (1986, NTV / Toho) --Numata
- Sukeban Deka III – Shoujo Ninpocho Denki – Episode 5 "Defeat! Devil's Kendama Killing Method" (1986, CX / Toei) --Tengu Shihan
- Zoku Sanbiki ga Kiru! – Episode 13 "Mother's Love's Successor and Shura's Journey" (1989, ANB / Toei)
- Onihei Hankachō – Episode 8 "Thief Nisujimichi" (1990, CX / Shochiku) --Tajiro Kadaki
- Shogun Iemitsu Shinobi Tabi (ANB / Toei)
  - 1st Series, Episode 14 "Hamamatsu, the murder of a girl" (1991) --Bicchu Saegusa
  - 2nd Series, Episode 16 "Karuizawa, a Woman Aiming at Hatamoto Gosengoku as an Enemy" (1993) --Shigezaemon Kajimoto
- Ue o Muite Arukō: Sakamoto Kyu Monogatari (2005) – as Kiyoshi Oshima

=== Film ===
- Yajutoshi – as Gonda (first movie role)
- Belladonna of Sadness (1973, Mushi Production / Nippon Herald Films) – Walla (Voice)
- Bodigaado Kiba: Hissatsu sankaku tobi – Kazuki Samejima
- The Street Fighter and Sister Street Fighter series
  - The Street Fighter (1974) – Tateki Shikenbaru (aka "Junjo")
  - Return of the Street Fighter (1974) – Tateki Shikenbaru (aka "Junjo")
  - Sister Street Fighter (1974) – Kazunao Inubashiri (aka "Hammerhead")
  - Sister Street Fighter: Hanging by a Thread (1974) – Inoichiro Honiden
  - The Return of the Sister Street Fighter (1975)
  - Dragon Princess (1976) – Shiroge Oni
- Black Panther Bitch M (1974) – Nakata
- Champion of Death (1975) – Nanba
- Karate for Life (1977) – Gōzō Yonashima
- G.I. Samurai (1979) – as Hosokawa Fujitaka
- Shogun's Ninja (1980) – as Momochi Sandayū
- Roaring Fire (1981) – as Hibiki
- Lady Battle Cop (1990) – as Team Phantom Captain
- Orochi, the Eight-Headed Dragon (1994)
- Juken Sentai Gekiranger: Nei-Nei! Hou-Hou! Hong Kong Decisive Battle (2007) – as Yang
