= Terutomo Yamazaki =

Japanese kickboxer (1947–2025)

Terutomo Yamazaki 山崎 照朝
- Born: July 31, 1947; Yamato, Yamanashi, Japan
- Died: June 22, 2025 (aged 77)
- Other names: The Dragon of Kyokushin; The Genius Karate Fighter
- Nationality: Japan
- Height: 1.77 m (5 ft 10 in)
- Weight: 62 kg (137 lb; 9.8 st)
- Division: Lightweight; Welterweight
- Style: Kyokushin Karate, Muay Thai, Kickboxing
- Stance: Orthodox
- Team: Kyokushin Gym
- Rank: 7th dan black belt in Gyakushin-Kai
- Years active: 1969–1970

Kickboxing record
- Total: 10
- Wins: 8
- By knockout: 8
- Losses: 2
- By knockout: 0
- Draws: 0
- No contests: 0

Other information
- Occupation: Grandmaster of Gyakushin-Kai
- Notable students: Shokei Matsui, Katsuaki Satō, Miyuki Miura, Seiji Isobe, Howard Collins, Toshikazu Satō, Takashi Azuma, Makoto Nakamura
- Website: https://archive.today/20040615005232/http://www15.ocn.ne.jp/~j-karate/ GYAKUSHIN-KAI (in Japanese)

Terutomo Yamazaki (山崎 照朝, Yamazaki Terutomo; July 31, 1947 – June 22, 2025) was a Japanese karateka from the Kyokushin Kaikan (極真会館) and professional lightweight kickboxer. He was the founder of Gyakushin-Kai (逆真会館) and a Director of Karate in Japan. He presided over the International Budo Karate Organization Gyakushin-Kai from the headquarters of the organization (honbu) in Ōmiya-ku, Saitama, Japan. His title as head of the Gyakushin-Kai organization was "Kancho" (Grandmaster - 7th Dan).

Yamazaki was the first champion of the All-Japan Full Contact Karate Open Championships in 1969, and made Kyokushin famous through his accomplishments. Because he fought and defeated Muay Thai boxers, he created a reputation for Kyokushin before the First All-Japan Open Full Contact Karate Championships was held.

Yamazaki was highly skilled at and an authority on fighting and breaking. When he fought someone, it was usual that he knocked them out without receiving any injuries himself. He was nicknamed "The Genius Karate Fighter" or "The Dragon of Kyokushin", and when he was an active fighter, he was the most popular figure of the time. He showed off his mixed karate and Muai Thai style of fighting at both full contact karate open championships and kickboxing, and was noted internationally as a prominent fighter in karate's history, appearing in Black Belt Magazine in the United States.

== Biography ==
=== Early years ===
Terutomo Yamazaki was born on July 31, 1947, in the village of Yamato, Yamanashi. He began the study of Kyokushin karate as a student in high school at the headquarters (honbu) of Kyokushin Kaikan at Ikebukuro, Tokyo, where founder Masutatsu Ōyama taught. Yamazaki practiced with the senior pupils who were Shigeru Ōyama, Yasuhiko Ōyama (both from The World Ōyama Karate in the United States – Shigeru is Sōshu and Yasuhiko is Saikō Shihan), Tadashi Nakamura and Hideyuki Ashihara at the time.

For two and a half years Yamazaki commuted three hours from his house to the dojo, and reached the rank of shodan (1st degree black belt) on April 15, 1967. This was an unusually short time period of only two years because of his level of talent and effort. He reached the rank of nidan (2nd degree black belt) on October 10, 1967.

Yamazaki instructed pupils of novice, intermediate and advanced levels at the headquarters of Kyokushin and the U.S. Army Camp Zama besides his own practice. He later said that it was good experience for him to instruct at Camp Zama as the pupils of the U.S. Army were larger than Japanese fighters. Several pupils measured over 200 centimeters in height and weighed over 90 kilograms, and practicing with these students led him to develop new ways to fight and knock out larger opponents.

=== Kickboxing career ===
Televised kickboxing was a huge boom from 1965 to 1975 when it was broadcast on the four TV stations, TBS, Nippon Television, TV Asahi and TV Tokyo all over Japan. TV Asahi requested a player from Kyokushin in February, 1969, and Masutatsu Ōyama elected Yamazaki and Yoshiji Soeno to enter the competitions. Ōyama also founded a kickboxing gym called Kyokushin Gym where they practiced kickboxing about two months before entering the kickboxing competitions in April, 1969. Yamazaki fought in the lightweight or welterweight division at kickboxing.

At the first competition, Soeno fought Kannanpai who was one of the strongest boxers of Muay Thai and had won over Tadashi Sawamura a half a year before their match. Soeno was defeated by Kannanpai, and the next match was Yamazaki and Kannanpai. Yamazaki gained a knockout win over Kannanpai with a right cross punch in the first round. He was also one of the strongest boxers of Muay Thai with knockout wins over Sawamura was Samanso from Lumpinee-ranked boxers. Samanso got knockdowns sixteen times from Sawamura, but Yamazaki fought and also knocked out Samanso in the first round.

After these fights, Yamazaki wanted to learn Muay Thai because it was a strong and technical martial art. He was able to learn Muay Thai from the coach and the boxers at the matches. As his Muai Thai techniques improved, especially his front kick, roundhouse kick, elbow and knee (strike), he included these techniques in his karate training.

The kickboxing promoters wanted to keep Yamazaki at kickboxing because he was a strong and good-looking fighter, and he had been very popular. The promoters presented Yamazaki with good contract terms, but Yamazaki refused the offer, responding that he had never fought martial arts for the money. It was the lifestyle of bushido that mattered to his thinking. Many offers and persuasions came again and again, and finally he signed to participate in kickboxing matches. But TV Asahi stopped broadcasting kickboxing, and he returned to karate after only one year. He fought ten kickboxing matches with a record of eight knockout wins and two losses (both lost on a decision).

=== Full Contact Karate Open Championships career ===
Kyokushin was planning to hold the First All-Japan Full Contact Karate Open Championships at the Tokyo Metropolitan Gymnasium in September 1969. It was not only a karate championship, but martial artists of various kinds also participated in this competition. Athletes included Gidon Gaddary who was an Israeli judo player weighing over 100 kilograms; Paul Jackson who was a heavyweight boxer from the United States; and three Muay Thai boxers from Lumpinee-ranked boxers including Birahon, Sakao and Samanso. The competition was fighting against other combative arts. The rules were simple: It was a foul to use a hand or elbow to the face and to attack a man's vital point. The players didn't use any protection. They fought using bare hands, bare knees and bare legs.

Before the First All-Japan Full Contact Karate Open Championships, Yamazaki had thought that he had to win this championship at any cost. If he did not become a champion at the All-Japan Open Championships, Kyokushin would end there when Yamazaki or Soeno of the Kyokushin's black belt were defeated by another style of karate fighters or other martial artists. Yamazaki admitted that the mental pressure was considerable, but he dealt with the pressures. He fought six matches and won five by ippon (knockout) and one by judgment at this championships tournament, and thus became the first champion of the All-Japan Full Contact Karate Open Championships.

Yamazaki also participated in the Second, Fourth and Fifth All-Japan Full Contact Karate Open Championships, winning 2nd place, 4th place and 2nd place, respectively. His karate training had decreased because he had graduated university and begun to work as a television producer after the Second All-Japan Open Championships. He had not planned to compete in the All-Japan Open Championships any further and did not enter the Third All-Japan Open Championships. But Masutatsu Ōyama ordered Yamazaki to participate in the Fourth All-Japan Open Championships because Ōyama knew Yamazaki was very popular. Many of the spectators came to watch Yamazaki's fight, so at the request of Ōyama, Yamazaki returned to competition at the Fourth All-Japan Open Championships in 1972.

All concerned in Kyokushin and the mass media were surprised at Yamazaki's performance at the Fifth All-Japan Full Contact Karate Open Championships in 1973 because he didn't have a chance to train sufficiently before the competition. But Yamazaki won five matches by strength and by overwhelming his opponents, and he came to the finals at last. His opponent was Hatsuo Royama. Rōyama was a specialist in low roundhouse kicks and he had practiced extensively before this championship. Although Yamazaki was undertrained, the match was almost even, and Rōyama won only on a decision. The final was one of the best matches ever at Kyokushin, and the story passed into history down from generation to generation. All concerned in Kyokushin and the mass media said "Yamazaki is a genius" at what he did.

Though Yamazaki tried to make time to practice karate while doing television production work, it was very difficult for him to continue training for the All-Japan Full Contact Karate Open Championships. He made a deliberate decision to retire from the All-Japan Open Championships and reported it to Masutatsu Ōyama after the Fifth All-Japan Open Championships. Yamazaki left a steady record of wins in all of the All-Japan Open Championships in which he participated. Yamazaki said "I don't do professional karate. I think that makes martial arts dirty. It was good for me only in the Spirit of Kyokushin that had been cultivated for years." It was a simple retirement.

=== Later life and death ===
After retiring from All-Japan Full Contact Karate Open Championships, Yamazaki worked as a producer of television advertisements and a martial arts writer, while practicing karate himself on his days off. Most of his fame came from kickboxing, and there was much demand for him to open a school of karate. Yamazaki consulted Masutatsu Ōyama and Ōyama obtained clearance for Yamazaki to open a karate dojo at Ōmiya in 1977. The dojo was managed by volunteers because Yamazaki did not wish to earn money by professional karate. For this reason, the dojo was not called Kyokushin but instead Fuurinkazan (風林火山) from his hometown hero Shingen Takeda. He established a Fuurinnkazan or nonprofit organization called International Budo Karate Organization Gyakushin-Kai (逆真会館) in 1995. He continued to manage this organization until his death.

Yamazaki died of bile duct cancer on June 22, 2025, at the age of 77.

== Profile ==
=== Fighting ===
Yamazaki was skilled in advanced techniques and very strong and fast at the basic techniques of front kick, roundhouse kick and knee, as well as the elbow and the cross punch (gyaku zuki). These techniques were refined by him because he integrated karate and Muay Thai. Yamazaki used his elbows and knees to defend himself. Pupils or fighters who did kumite or fought with him said "We always hurt our hands and legs. Yamazaki had a technique which means defense is offense."

=== Expert breaking ===
Yamazaki was not only an expert at kumite, but also an expert at breaking. All-Japan Full Contact Karate Open Championships and World Full Contact Karate Open Championships included a breaking competition as well as kumite, with players required to demonstrate breaking of cryptomeria boards. The challenge was to break the boards with bare hands, bare elbows and bare legs. Competitors could use four types of technique: punching ("tsuki"), kicking ("keri"), knifehand strike, and elbow. The winner was decided by the total number of broken cryptomeria boards. Yamazaki broke four boards by punching, seven by kicking, six by knifehand strike and seven by elbow with a total of 24, and won the breaking championship at the Fifth All-Japan Open Championships in 1973.

This record was not broken for a while, but it was exceeded in total breaking and reached a new height with Willie Williams, a karateka from the United States, at the Second World Full Contact Karate Open Championships in 1979. He broke five boards by punching, six by kicking, eight by knifehand strike, and seven by elbow with a total of 26. Williams won 3rd place in kumite, as well. However, all concerned in Kyokushin and the mass media pointed out that Williams was 196 centimeters in height and 100 kilogram in weight, while Yamazaki was 177 centimeters in height and 62 kilograms in weight with a difference of almost 40 kilograms, while the number of the broken boards was only different by two. Yamazaki proved his skill and talent eminently.

=== Teaching ===
Yamazaki was not only a strong fighter but also became a respected teacher. Some fighters who have benefited by studying under Yamazaki are Katsuaki Satō, Miyuki Miura, Seiji Isobe (teacher of Glaube Feitosa, Francisco Filho and Andrews Nakahara), Howard Collins, Toshikazu Satō (champion of the Eighth All-Japan Full Contact Karate Open Championships), Takashi Azuma (champion of the Ninth All-Japan Open Championships), Makoto Nakamura (twice champion of the Second and Third World Full Contact Karate Open Championships) and Shokei Matsui. They are unanimous in their respect for Yamazaki.

== Anecdotes ==
Masutatsu Ōyama often summoned Yamazaki to the headquarters of Kyokushin. Because Yamazaki speaks his mind to everyone frankly, Ōyama liked Yamazaki's personality. Ōyama and Yamazaki had discussed the method of the organizational operation for quite a while before Ōyama's death.

After the First World Full Contact Karate Open Championships in 1975, Yamazaki visited Shigeru Ōyama's dojo at White Plains, New York. Shigeru was the Saikō-shihan (the top instructor) of Kyokushin at that time. Shigeru talked about when Yamazaki practiced with Shigeru's pupils. "My pupils were very surprised to see Yamazaki's fighting. His footwork is sharp and light. All of his techniques are fast, containing a lot of destructive power, and they thought it looked very fine. One of my pupils who watched the First World Open Championships asked me why Yamazaki did not participate in the First World Open Championships? Female and children pupils are most especially impressed from Yamazaki. They have said to me that Yamazaki is a stronger and better-looking man than Bruce Lee."

== Literature ==
=== Books ===
- Mushino kokoro: Karate ni kaketa seishun (無心の心 — 空手に賭けた青春). Sportslife Inc. (スポーツライフ社). 1980.
- Yamazaki Terutomo no jissen karate (山崎照朝の実戦空手). Ikeda Shoten. 1984. ISBN 4-262-11054-0.

=== DVDs ===
- Yamazaki Terutomo no jissen karate (山崎照朝の実戦空手) (DVD) (in Japanese). Japan: Quest Inc. (クエスト). 2001-04-13. ASIN B00005HX0Y.
- Yamazaki Terutomo no jissen karate taosutame no kamae to koubou (山崎照朝の実戦空手倒すための構えと攻防) (DVD) (in Japanese). Japan: BAB Japan. 2007. ISBN 4-86220-300-0.

== Film ==
=== Documentary ===
- Strongest Karate (地上最強のカラテ), Sankyo Motion Picture Company (三協映画), 1976
- Strongest and Last Karate (最強最後のカラテ), Sankyo Motion Picture Company, 1980

== See also ==
- Yoshiji Soeno - another prestigious student of Mas Oyama.
- List of male kickboxers
