= Willie Williams (karateka) =

American karateka and mixed martial arts fighter

- Born: 14 April 1951; Warrenton, North Carolina, U.S.
- Died: 8 June 2019 (aged 68)
- Other names: Bear Killer
- Height: 2.00 m (6 ft 7 in)
- Weight: 105 kg (231 lb; 16.5 st)
- Division: Super Heavyweight
- Style: Kyokushin Karate
- Trainer: Tadashi Nakamura, Shigeru Oyama, Kenji Kurosaki

Mixed martial arts record
- Total: 13
- Wins: 9
- By knockout: 7
- By submission: 2
- Losses: 4
- By submission: 3
- By decision: 1
- Last updated on: May 20, 2022

Willie Williams (April 14, 1951 – June 8, 2019) was an American karateka, mixed martial artist and professional wrestler.

== Career ==
In 1975, Willie Williams participated in Mas Oyama's 1st World Full-Contact Karate Open Championships tournament as part of the U.S. team coached by Tadashi Nakamura and Shigeru Oyama. He lost to Howard Collins of the United Kingdom in the third round by decision. Four years later, in 1979, he took part in the 2nd World Open Championships. That year, around 160 fighters from all over the world entered this open weight class tournament. Williams was able to battle his way through to the semifinals, where he was defeated by Keiji Sanpei. He made his third appearance at the 3rd World Open Championships in 1984, making it to the final 32.

In 1980, Williams fought Japan's top pro-wrestling star Antonio Inoki for the World Martial Arts Heavyweight Championship in Tokyo. The bout ended in a draw after both competitors repeatedly fell out of the ring. Although the match was worked, it is seen as a precursor to modern mixed martial arts. William's fight against Inoki was voted as the top professional fighting match in Japan in the 20th century in 2003 by professional Japanese fight analysts.

Williams debuted in March 1992 in the combat sport promotion Fighting Network RINGS in Japan. He worked with the organization until 1996. On January 4, 1997, nearly 17 years after his first match against Antonio Inoki, the two would have a rematch with Inoki as the winner.

From 1999 to 2000, Williams worked for Frontier Martial Arts Wrestling. He retired from professional wrestling in 2000.

Williams died on June 8, 2019, at the age of 68.

== Titles ==
- 3rd World Open Karate Tournament 1984 (IKO) - Final 32
- 2nd World Open Karate Tournament 1979 (IKO) - 3rd Place

== Mixed martial arts record ==
Professional record breakdown
| 13 matches | 9 wins | 4 losses |
| By knockout | 7 | 0 |
| By submission | 2 | 3 |
| By decision | 0 | 1 |
| By disqualification | 0 | 0 |
| Unknown | 0 | 0 |
| Draws | 0 | |
| No contests | 0 | |

| Res. | Record | Opponent | Method | Event | Date | Round | Time | Location | Notes |
|---|---|---|---|---|---|---|---|---|---|
| Win | 9-4 | (Netherlands) Pieter Oele | TKO | RINGS - Mega Battle Tournament 1994: Second Round | October 22, 1994 | 1 | 6:41 | Fukuoka, Japan | |
| Win | 8-4 | (Japan) Masayuki Naruse | TKO | RINGS - Rings 1994 in Ariake | June 18, 1994 | 1 | 10:54 | Tokyo, Japan | |
| Loss | 7-4 | (Japan) Akira Maeda | Submission | RINGS - Rings 1994 in Sendai | May 17, 1994 | 1 | 2:38 | Sendai, Japan | |
| Loss | 7-3 | (Netherlands) Dick Vrij | Decision | RINGS - Mega Battle Tournament 1993: First Round | October 23, 1993 | 5 | 3:00 | Fukuoka, Japan | |
| Win | 7-2 | (Netherlands) Dick Vrij | Decision | RINGS - Battle Dimension: Toky Bay Area Circuit III | August 21, 1993 | 5 | 3:00 | Yokohama, Japan | |
| Win | 6-2 | (Georgia (country)) Bitsadze Tariel | Submission | RINGS - Battle Dimension: Osaka Metropolitan Circuit II | July 13, 1993 | 3 | 1:35 | Osaka, Japan | |
| Loss | 5-2 | (Russia) Volk Han | Submission | RINGS - Battle Dimension: Tokyo Bay Area Circuit II | July 16, 1993 | 1 | 11:46 | Tokyo, Japan | |
| Win | 5-1 | (Japan) Yukihiro Takenami | KO | RINGS - Mega Battle Tournament 1992: Second Round | November 13, 1992 | 2 | 1:33 | Hiroshima, Japan | |
| Loss | 4-1 | (Japan) Akira Maeda | Submission | RINGS - Mega Battle VI: Hayate | July 16, 1992 | 3 | 2:03 | Osaka, Japan | |
| Win | 4-0 | (Netherlands) Ton van Maurik | KO | RINGS - Mega Battle V: Shi Shi Ku | June 25, 1992 | 1 | 5:08 | Hiroshima, Japan | |
| Win | 3-0 | (Georgia (country)) Bitsadze Ameran | KO | RINGS - Mega Battle IV: Kohrin | May 16, 1992 | 3 | 2:07 | Hiroshima, Japan | |
| Win | 2-0 | (Japan) Mitsuya Nagai | KO | RINGS - Mega Battle III: Ikazuchi | April 3, 1992 | 2 | 1:13 | Hiroshima, Japan | |
| Win | 1-0 | (Netherlands) Peter Smit | TKO | RINGS - Mega Battle Tournament 1992: Second Round | November 13, 1992 | 1 | 2:50 | Yokohama, Japan | |

== Karate record ==
Karate record
| Date | Result | Opponent | Event | Location | Method | Round | Time | Record |
|---|---|---|---|---|---|---|---|---|
| 1992-03-26 | | (Japan) Nobuaki Kakuda | RINGS - Kakutogi Olympic | | | | | |
| 1991-06-04 | Loss | (Japan) Masaaki Satake | USA Oyama Karate vs. Karate Masamichi | | Decision (Unanimous) | 3 | | |
Legend: Win Loss Draw/No contest Notes
