= Steve Arneil =

Martial artist (1934–2021)

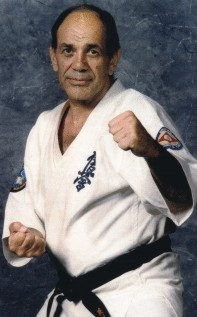
- Born: 29 August 1934; Krugersdorp, Transvaal, South Africa
- Died: 2 July 2021 (aged 86); London, United Kingdom
- Style: Kyokushin Karate
- Teacher: Masutatsu Oyama
- Rank: 10th dan karate Black belt judo

Other information
- Spouse: Tsuyuko Arneil
- Website: http://www.ifk-kyokushin.com/

Steve Arneil (29 August 1934 – 2 July 2021) was a South African-British master of Kyokushin karate. He learned directly from Masutatsu Oyama and was a senior instructor in Oyama's International Karate Organization (IKO) until 1991, when he resigned from the IKO. Arneil was the founder and President of the International Federation of Karate (IFK), held the rank of 10th dan, and held the title Hanshi. He and his wife settled in the United Kingdom in 1965.

== Early life ==
Arneil was born on 29 August 1934 in Krugersdorp, Transvaal, South Africa. When he was 10 years old, his family moved to Northern Rhodesia (now Zambia), and he began training in kung fu, judo and boxing there. At age 16, he was selected to represent Northern Rhodesia in rugby. By the age of 17, Arneil had earned black belt status in judo, and he had also practised kenpo and karate. He moved to Durban, South Africa, for tertiary studies in mechanical engineering.

In Durban, Arneil trained at a judo dojo (training hall) that also offered karate training. He made a practice of going down to the harbour and asking arriving Japanese people if they practised karate; if they did, he would invite them to training at the dojo. In 1959, Arneil left South Africa, bound for Southeast Asia.

== Japan ==
Arneil travelled to China, South Korea, and Hong Kong before arriving in Japan. He trained in a few karate styles, including Shotokan, Wado-ryu, and Goju-ryu (under Gogen Yamaguchi). In the course of these studies, the name "Oyama" was mentioned to him by several people, including Yamaguchi, and this aroused his curiosity. In January 1961, through Donn Draeger, Arneil began to study Kyokushin karate under Masutatsu Oyama. He recalled that, unlike the other karate schools he had visited in Japan (who had welcomed him with minimal reservation), Oyama's Kyokushin school was selective; on their first meeting, Oyama told Arneil, "Remember, you asked me to train, I didn't ask you. You don't follow the rules, you out. Understand?"

Arneil was promoted to the rank of 1st dan in Kyokushin karate on 15 May 1962, and attained 2nd dan on 16 April 1963. He was later 'adopted' by Oyama, to allow him to marry a Japanese woman in 1964. Of his wife, Tsuyuko Arneil, he has said, "She worked in a bank, and she supported both of us when I was training. I didn't have time for work." Arneil estimated that he trained an average of six hours each day during his time in Japan, with training normally commencing at 10:00 AM and concluding between 10:30 PM to 1:00 AM the next morning.

On 22 May 1965, Arneil became the first person to complete the 100-man kumite after Oyama himself. The 100-man kumite took him around 2 hours and 45 minutes to complete, with each round scheduled to take 1 minute and 30 seconds (but a round ended if he managed to knock down his opponent). In an interview in 2005, Arneil said, "I did not have to beat everyone I fought, that would have been ridiculous! I just had to keep going, I had to have the spirit not to give up, no matter what they threw at me." On 10 July 1965, Arneil was promoted to 3rd dan.

== United Kingdom ==
Originally, Arneil had planned to return to South Africa, but Oyama asked him to go to the United Kingdom to help establish Kyokushin karate there; accordingly, he and his wife travelled to London in 1965. The move was not an easy one. Arneil recalled: "We were greeted by stares, the same stares we had faced in Japan, only this time they were directed at my wife. The war was still on, you see, and the Japanese were seen as the enemy. We had travelled half way round the world and we still faced the same prejudice that we had faced in Japan. That was very hard for both of us." The couple tried to move to Australia, but this failed; Arneil said that "it is purely by chance that we ended up staying in England."

In late 1965, Arneil and Bob Boulton founded the British Karate Kyokushinkai (BKK) organisation. The BKK's first full-time dojo was opened in Stratford, east London. In May 1966, Arneil received promotion to the rank of 4th dan. From 1968 to 1976, he was the Team Manager and Coach for the All Styles English and British Karate team which, in 1975/76, became the first non-Japanese team to win the karate World Championship. Arneil was promoted to 5th dan on 15 January 1968, and to 6th dan on 7 October 1974. In 1975, the French Karate Federation awarded him the title of "World's Best Coach." On 6 August 1977, Arneil was promoted to the rank of 7th dan in Kyokushin karate.

== Later life ==
Kyokushin's 5th World Tournament, in 1991, was a significant point in the history of the IKO. Arneil stated simply, "It was a fixed tournament." He claimed that political and financial pressures contributed to the situation, but that "the decider was when Sosai [Oyama] was supposed to meet me in Switzerland, and he didn't come. I didn't want to be involved in the politics anymore. I left the IKO, not Kyokushin." That same year, Arneil and the BKK resigned from the IKO, and Arneil then founded his own karate organisation, the IFK.

On 30 May 1992, the British karate community awarded Arneil the rank of 8th dan for his services to karate in the UK. On 26 May 2001, IFK country representatives awarded him the rank of 9th dan at their meeting in Berlin. On 23 July 2011, Arneil was awarded 10th Dan at the 3rd IFK U-18 World Tournament by the IFK as recognition for his commitment to Kyokushin Karate.

Arneil was life President of the BKK and President of the IFK until January 2021 when he handed the IFK presidency to Shihan David Pickthall.

Arneil died on 2 July 2021, at the age of 86.

Arneil wrote several books on karate, including Karate: A guide to unarmed combat (1975, co-authored), Modern Karate (1975, co-authored), Better Karate (1976, co-authored), and Teach yourself: Karate (1993, co-authored).
