= Seiji Isobe =

Japanese karate instructor in Brazil

- Born: Seiji Isobe; March 1, 1948 (age 78); Fukui, Japan
- Style: Kyokushin Karate
- Rank: 9th Dan Black Belt in Kyokushin Karate

Other information
- Notable students: Ademir da Costa, Francisco Filho, Glaube Feitosa, Ewerton Teixeira, Andrews Nakahara

Seiji Isobe (磯部清次, Isobe Seiji; born March 1, 1948) is a Japanese karate instructor residing in Brazil. He is a member of the IKO1 (Kyokushin Matsui Group)'s international committee and is the General Manager of the South American Regional Federation. He holds a rank of 9th Dan Black in Kyokushin Karate.

Seiji Isobe, although unsuccessful in Full-Contact Karate competitions himself, became renowned as one of the best Kyokushin and/or Full-Contact Karate coaches. He is known for training various highly prestigious Brazilian Karateka, including Francisco Filho, Glaube Feitosa, Ewerton Teixeira, Andrews Nakahara and Ademir da Costa.

== Biography ==
Seiji Isobe was born March 1, 1948, at Fukui City, Fukui Prefecture, Japan. He began traditional karate with Shōtōkan in 1961. He would quit Shotokan in 1963, losing confidence in the style after the head teacher of the dojo got beaten in a physical altercation.

One day, Isobe became interested in Kyokushin Karate, after reading the book "100 Man-ri no karate" (Note: 100万人の空手 - Eng. "Million People's Karate" ASIN B000J9MOOC, ISBN 978-4061414112) written by Kyokushin Karate founder Mas Oyama. Isobe would temporarily participate in the practice of Kyokushin Kaikan at the headquarters dojo in Tokyo in 1968. Later, he moved to Tokyo in 1970 to practice in earnest. It is said that when he started, he was receiving guidance while respecting and admiring Terutomo Yamazaki and Yasuhiko Oyama. Other seniors and friends at the same time were Miyuki Miura and Katsuaki Sato.

On September 20, 1972, he established a Kyokushin Dojo in Fukui. Mas Ōyama would notice his managerial abilities, and offered Isobe the mission of promoting and setting up a dojo network in South America. That same year, Seiji Isobe permanently moved to Brazil and became the head of Kyokushin in South America.

After Masutatsu Oyama's death, Seiji Isobe remained in the Kyokushin faction led by Shokei Matsui (IKO1/Kyokushin Matsui Group) and to this is the General Manager of the organization in South America.

In November 1999, his disciple Francisco Filho, who participated in the 7th Open Tournament World Open Karate Championship (IKO1), became the first non-Japanese Kyokushin World Champion. (Note: To be precise, Shokei Matsui, a Korean resident in Japan, has already won the 4th World Championship in 1987. However, at that time Matsui participated as a representative of the Japanese athletes and was the captain of the Japanese national team, so the mass media did not take Matsui as a Korean in Japan with the tacit understanding.)

In July 2014, in commemoration of the 40th anniversary of the Brazilian branch, 12 world-class teams from 25 countries participated and held the ""Brazil Kyokushin 40th Anniversary World Cup Championship" in São Paulo. In addition, October 10, when Isobe took the first step to the land of Brazil in 1972, was designated as "Kyokushin Day" by the São Paulo City Council.

In 2018, he received the Honorary Citizenship of São Paulo.

== Books ==
- Isobe, Seiji (1999). ザ・ブラジル極真: 世界を制する一撃カラテ、結実した極真魂 [The Brasil Kyokushin: Karate that dominates the world, the fruitful kyokushin spirit] (in Japanese). Sukījānaru. ISBN 9784789920742.
