= Akira Masuda =

Japanese karateka

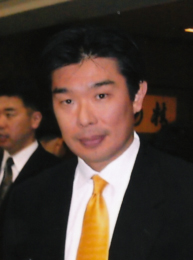
- Akira Masuda presiding at Ko Ryu Jiai (Tournament), Japan, 3 November 2003
- Born: May 22, 1962; Kanazawa, Ishikawa prefecture, Japan
- Height: 1.77 m (5 ft 10 in)
- Weight: 85.5 kg (188 lb; 13.46 st)
- Style: Kyokushin Karate
- Teacher: Masutatsu Oyama

Akira Masuda (増田 章, Masuda Akira) (born May 22, 1962) is a Japanese Kyokushin kaikan karateka. In March 1991 he completed the 100 man kumite supervised by Mas Oyama.

He was born in 1962 in Kanazawa, Ishikawa prefecture, Japan. In junior high school he was captain of the school judo club. When he was 16 years old he joined Kyokushin Kaikan Ishikawa Dojo. At 19 years old he made his debut in his first All Japan Tournament.

He remained a top athlete in Kyokushin All Japan Tournaments, going on to beat Michel Wedel, Gerard Gordeau and Michael Thompson. He fought and lost to Andy Hug however Hug was unable to walk after the fight.

In 1990 he won a gold medal in the 22nd All Japan Kyokushin Tournament. and in 1991 he placed second in the 5th World Karate Tournament.

He is the shihan of Kyokushin Kaikan Masuda Dojo. In 2007 Masuda published the book "Freestyle Karate" and in 2009 he published "Masuda Akira - Go, Budojin toshite Ikiru".
