= Kyokushin =

Style of karate

Kyokushin (極眞)
- Logo of Kyokushin-kai written in a style of cursive script kanji.
- Focus: Striking
- Hardness: Full-contact
- Country of origin: Japan
- Creator: Masutatsu Oyama (Choi Bae-Dal)
- Famous practitioners: (see notable practitioners)
- Ancestor arts: Gōjū-ryū, Shotokan, Bogutsuki Karate
- Descendant arts: Kudo (or Daido Juku) Ashihara, Enshin, Seidokaikan, Shidokan, Satojuku, Seidō juku, Dutch Kickboxing, Japanese Kickboxing, Zendokai

Chinese name
- Traditional Chinese: 極眞會館
- Simplified Chinese: 極真会馆
Transcriptions
Standard Mandarin
- Hanyu Pinyin: Jízhēn Huìguān
- Bopomofo: ㄐㄧˊ ㄓㄣ ㄏㄨㄟˋ ㄍㄨㄢ
- Wade–Giles: Chi^{2}-chen^{1} Hui^{4}-kuan^{1}
- IPA: [tɕǐ.ʈʂə́n xwêɪ.kwán]
Yue: Cantonese
- Yale Romanization: gihkjān wuihgún
- Jyutping: gik6zan1 wui6gun2
- IPA: [kɪk̚˨.tsɐn˥ wuj˨.kun˧˥]

Korean name
- Hangul: 극진회관
- Hanja: 極眞會館
Transcriptions
- Revised Romanization: Geukjin Hoegwan
- McCune–Reischauer: Kŭkchin Hoegwan

Japanese name
- Hiragana: きょくしんかいかん
- Katakana: キョクシンカイカン
- Kyūjitai: 極眞會館
- Shinjitai: 極真会館
Transcriptions
- Revised Hepburn: Kyokushin Kaikan
- Kunrei-shiki: Kyokusin Kaikan

Kyokushin (極真; pronounced [kʲokɯ̥ɕiɴ]; lit. 'the ultimate truth') is a style of karate originated in Japan. It is a full-contact style of stand-up fighting and is rooted in a philosophy of self-improvement, discipline, and hard training.

Kyokushin Kaikan [Kaikan (会館) Assembly Hall or "Honbu" (本部) Headquarters] is the martial arts organization founded in 1964 by Korean-Japanese Masutatsu Oyama (大山倍達, Ōyama Masutatsu), officially the International Karate Organization. Previously, this institution was known as the Oyama Dojo. Since 1964, the style has continued to spread to more than 120 countries, becoming one of the largest martial arts organizations in the world, and in Japan itself.

== History ==
=== Founding ===
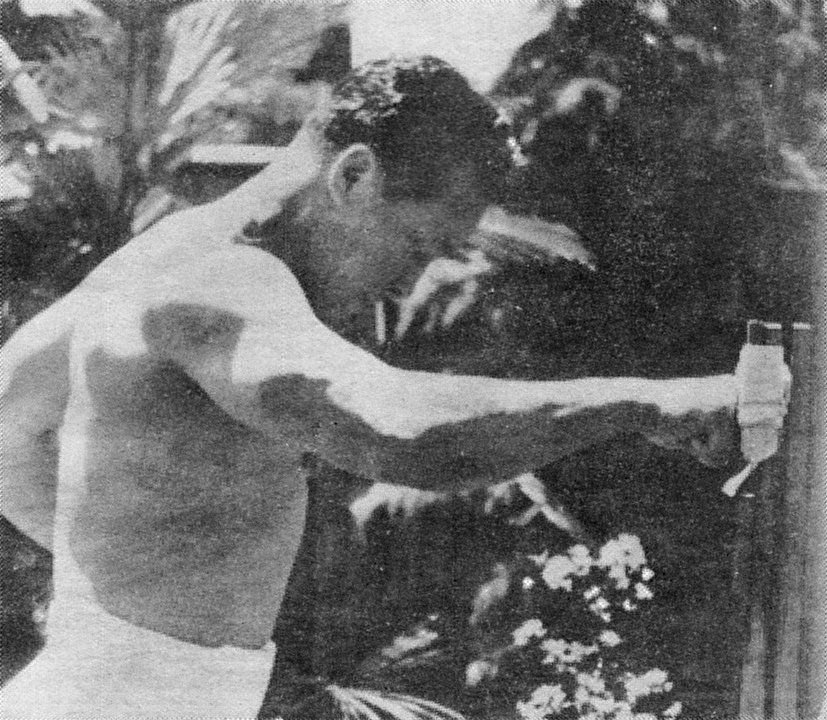
Mas Oyama karate practice in 1954

Initially, Masutatsu Oyama opened his first official dōjō – the Oyama Dojo – in 1953, in a small building behind Rikkyo University to teach Goju-ryu style of traditional Karate. Subsequently, Oyama's karate theory would deviate from Goju-ryu and would form his own style. His instruction was distinguished by goals improving the strength in the actual battle by performing a kumite that directly hits the opponent's body with a thrust or kick. This was unlike the other schools of karate at the time. Over the next ten years, Oyama built his organization and demonstrated his karate around the world to spread it.

Around 1956, Oyama would rename his school the "Oyama Dojo". In early days of the dojo, Oyama would not take the duty of teaching newer students. Instead, Eiji Yasuda (a Shotokan teacher from Gakushuin University Karatedo Club), Masashi Ishibashi, Ichiro Minamimoto (both Goju-ryu practitioners from Karatedo Club of Nihon University) and others would teach the newcomers to Oyama's dojo. Later, Kenji Kurosaki also became a teacher in the school.

On December 6, 1959, Hirofumi Okada was the first person to practice at the Oyama Dojo that was granted a black belt (first dan), and was listed as the first in the official yearly promotion register of the Kyokushin Kaikan.

In April 1964, Mas Oyama established the 'International Karate Organization Kyokushin kaikan' (commonly abbreviated to IKO or IKOK) under the umbrella of the Kyokushin Scholarship Foundation. Upon formation, Eisaku Sato acted as chairman and Matsuhei Mori as the vice chairman, with Oyama as the director (later president). Oyama directed the organization through a period of expansion. In June of the same year, the headquarters dojo (later the general headquarters) was completed in Ikebukuro, Toshima, Tokyo.

Oyama hand-picked instructors who displayed ability in marketing the style and gaining new members. Oyama would choose an instructor to open a new dojo. The instructor would move to that town and demonstrate his karate skills in public places. After that, word of mouth would spread through the local area until the dojo had a dedicated core of students. Kyokushin sought to expand its presence with contact with other martial arts disciples, interaction with other groups, matches, assimilation of martial arts technique.

Oyama also sent instructors to other countries such as the Netherlands (Kenji Kurosaki), Australia (Mamoru Kaneko and Shigeo Kato), the United States (Miyuki Miura, Tadashi Nakamura, Shigeru Oyama and Yasuhiko Oyama), Great Britain (Bob Boulton, later joined by Steve Arneil), Canada (Tatsuji Nakamura) and Brazil (Seiji Isobe) to spread Kyokushin in the same way. Many students, including Steve Arneil, Jon Bluming, and Howard Collins, traveled to Japan to train with Oyama directly. Kyokushin also sought to develop a close connection with VIPs and celebrities, focusing on a mass media strategy to increase fans and gain students.

In 1969, Oyama staged The First All-Japan Full Contact Karate Open Championships and Terutomo Yamazaki became the first champion. All-Japan Championships have been held at every year. In 1975, The First World Full Contact Karate Open Championships were held in Tokyo.

Kyokushin Karate would develop notoriety as "Kenka Karate" or "Brawling Karate", a moniker Oyama disliked.

At its peak, Oyama was alive in the 1990s, with branches set up in each prefecture, with more than 1,000 official branch dojos in 123 countries around the world, and a scale of 12 million members.

=== Splintering organizations ===
Even before Mas Oyama's death in 1994, there have been several organizations that broke off from Oyama's IKO. In 1980, the Dutch Kyokushin instructor Jon Bluming would exit the IKO organization to establish the BKK (Budo Kai Kan) in 1980. In 1991, Steve Arneil lead exodus of British Karate Kyokushinkai from IKO, to establish IFK – the International Federation of Karate.

=== The IKO crisis ===
In April 1994, Oyama died of lung cancer at the age of 70 without naming a successor, leaving Akiyoshi Matsui in charge of the IKO. This has brought much political and economic turmoil to the Kyokushin worldwide, leading to fragmentation of the organization at the national and international level.

After Mas Oyama's death, the International Karate Organization (IKO) split into two groups, primarily due to personal conflicts over who should succeed Oyama as chairman. One group led by Shokei Matsui became known as IKO, and a second group led by Yukio Nishida and Sanpei was known as IKO-2. The will was proven to be invalid in the family Court of Tokyo in 1995.

There were claims that near the end of his life, Oyama named Matsui (then ranked 5th dan, and clearly junior in rank to several senior instructors) to succeed him in leading the IKO. However this claim has been disputed with Oyama's family and Matsui himself.

At present there are now several IKO organizations, such as IKO (Shokei Matsui), IKO2 Shinkyokushinkai (Kenji Midori), IKO3 (Y. Matsushima), IKO4 (T. Tezuka).

== Techniques and training ==
Kyokushin Karate training consists of three main elements: technique, forms, and sparring. These are sometimes referred to as the three "K's" after the Japanese words for them: kihon (basics), kata (formalized sequences of combat techniques), and kumite (sparring).

=== Kata ===
Kata is a form of ritualized self-training in which patterned or memorized movements are done in order to practice a form of combat maneuverings. According to a highly regarded Kyokushin text, "The Budo Karate of Mas Oyama" by Cameron Quinn, long time interpreter to Oyama, the kata of Kyokushin are classified into Northern and Southern Kata.

The northern kata stems from the Shuri-te tradition of karate, and are drawn from Shotokan karate which Oyama learned while training under Gichin Funakoshi. The southern kata stems from the Naha-te tradition of karate, and are mostly drawn from Goju-ryu karate, which Oyama learned while training under So Nei Chu and Gogen Yamaguchi. One exception may be the kata "Yantsu" which possibly originates with Motobu-ha Shito-ryu. There is also Ura Kata – Several kata are also done in "ura", which essentially means all moves are done in mirrored form. The ura, or 'reverse' kata, were developed by Oyama as an aid to developing balance and skill in circular techniques against multiple opponents.

Northern Kata
Kata name	Description
Taikyoku sono ichi; Taikyoku Sono Ni; Taikyoku Sono San	The Taikyoku kata were originally created by Gichin Funakoshi, founder of Shotokan karate.
Pinan Sono Ichi; Pinan Sono Ni; Pinan Sono San; Pinan Sono Yon; Pinan Sono Go	The 5 Pinan katas, known in some other styles as Heian, were originally created in 1904 by Ankō Itosu, a master of Shuri-te and Shorin ryu (a combination of the shuri-te and tomari-te traditions of karate). He was a teacher to Gichin Funakoshi. Pinan (pronounced /pin-ann/) literally translates as Peace and Harmony.
Kanku	Some organizations have removed the "Dai" from the name, calling it only "Kanku", as there is no "Sho" or other alternate Kanku variation practiced in Kyokushin. The Kanku kata was originally known as Kusanku or Kushanku, and is believed to have either been taught by, or inspired by, a Chinese martial artist who was sent to Okinawa as an ambassador in the Ryukyu Kingdom during the 16th century. Kanku translates to "sky watching".
Sushiho	The Kata Sushiho is a greatly modified version of the old Okinawian kata that in Shotokan is known as Gojushiho, and in some other styles as Useishi. The name means "54 steps", referring to a symbolic number in Buddhism.
Bassai	A very old Okinawan kata of unknown origin, the name Bassai or Passai translates to "to storm a castle". It was originally removed from the Kyokushin syllabus in the late 1950s, but was reintroduced into some Kyokushin factions after Oyama's death and the resulting fractioning of the organization.
Tekki	This kata is a very old Okinawan kata, also known as Tekki in Shotokan. It is generally classified as belonging to the Tomari-te tradition. The name Tekki translates to "iron horse" but the meaning of the name Naihanchi is "internal divided conflict". It was originally removed from the Kyokushin syllabus in the late 1950s, but was reintroduced into some Kyokushin factions after Oyama's death and the resulting fractioning of the organization.
Sokugi Taikyoku sono ichi; Sokugi Taikyoku sono ni; Sokugi Taikyoku sono san	Unique to Kyokushin. These three kata were created by Masutatsu Oyama to further develop kicking skills and follow the same embu-sen (performance line) as the original Taikyoku kata. Sokugi literally means Kicking, while Taikyoku translates to Grand Ultimate View. They were not formally introduced into the Kyokushin syllabus until after the death of Oyama.

Southern Kata
Kata name	Description
Gekisai Dai; Gekisai Sho	Gekisai was created by Chojun Miyagi, founder of Goju-ryu karate. The name Gekisai means "attack and smash". In some styles (including some Goju-ryu factions) it is sometimes known under the alternative name "Fukyugata".
Tensho	Tensho draws it origin from Goju-ryu where it was developed by Chojun Miyagi, who claimed credit for its creation. There are however some who claim that it is merely a variation of an old, and now lost, Chinese kata known as "rokkishu" mentioned in the Bubishi (an ancient text often called the "Bible of Karate"). It is based on the point and circle principles of Kempo. It was regarded as an internal yet advanced Kata by Oyama. The name means "rotating palms".
Sanchin	Sanchin is a very old kata with roots in China. The name translates to "three points" or "three battles". The version done in Kyokushin is most closely related to the version Kanryo Higashionna (or Higaonna), teacher of Chojun Miyagi, taught (and not to the modified version taught by Chojun Miyagi himself).
Saifa (Saiha)	A kata with Chinese influences, its name translates to "smash and tear down". The kata may have been brought from China by Kanryo Higashionna or developed by Chojun Miyagi. Of Kanryo Higashionna's top two students only Chojun Miyagi (the other being Juhatsu Kyoda) taught this kata, leading to debate over the origins.
Seienchin	Originally a Chinese kata, regarded as very old. It was also brought to Okinawa by Kanryo Higashionna. The name translates roughly to "grip and pull into battle".
Seipai	Originally a Chinese kata. It was also brought to Okinawa by Kanryo Higashionna. The name translates to the number 18, which is significant in Buddhism.
Yantsu	Yantsu is an old kata with unknown origin that is alternately classified as belonging to the Naha-te or Tomari-te karate tradition. Outside of Kyokushin, it today is only practiced in Motobu-ha Shitō-ryū (that today is part of the Nihon Karate-do Kuniba-kai), where it in a slightly longer variant is called "Hansan" or "Ansan". The name Yantsu translates to "keep pure". How the kata was introduced into Kyokushin is unknown, although it is speculated that it was somehow imported from Motobu-ha Shito-ryu.
Tsuki no kata	This kata was created by Seigo Tada, founder of the Seigokan branch of Goju-ryu. In Seigokan Goju-ryu the kata is known as Kihon Tsuki no kata and is one of two Katas created by the founder. How the kata was introduced into Kyokushin is largely unknown, but since Tadashi Nakamura is often claimed in error as the creator of the kata in Kyokushin, speculations are that he introduced it into Kyokushin after learning it from his Goju-ryu background.
Garyu	Unique to Kyokushin. Does not originate from traditional Okinawan karate, but was created by Oyama and named after his pen name, Garyu. (Note: Meaning "reclining dragon". It is the Japanese pronunciation of the characters 臥龍, which is the name of the village (Il Loong) in Korea where Oyama was born.)

Ura Kata
Kata name	Description
Taikyoku sono ichi ura	Taikyoku number 1, but backwards.
Taikyoku sono ni ura	Taikyoku number 2, but backwards.
Taikyoku sono san ura	Taikyoku number 3, but backwards.
Pinan sono ichi ura	Pinan number 1, but backwards.
Pinan sono ni ura	Pinan number 2, but backwards.
Pinan sono san ura	Pinan number 3, but backwards.
Pinan sono yon ura	Pinan number 4, but backwards.
Pinan sono go ura	Pinan number 5, but backwards.

=== Kumite ===
Kumite, also called sparring, is used to train the application of the various techniques within a fighting situation. Sparring is usually an important part of training in most Kyokushin organizations, especially at the upper levels with experienced students.

In most Kyokushin organizations, hand and elbow strikes to the head or neck are prohibited. However, kicks to the head, knee strikes, punches to the upper body, and kicks to the inner and outer leg are permitted. In some Kyokushin organizations, especially outside of a tournament environment, gloves and shin protectors are worn. Children often wear headgear to lessen the impact of any kicks to the head. Speed and control are instrumental in sparring and in a training environment it is not the intention of either practitioner to injure his opponent as much as it is to successfully execute the proper strike. Tournament fighting under knockdown karate rules is significantly different as the objective is to down an opponent. Full-contact sparring in kyokushin is considered the ultimate test of strength, endurance, techniques and spirit.

One of kyokushin's defining aspects is the level of challenge within kumite. The ultimate challenge is the 100-man kumite challenge, this is where a challenger must complete a total of 100 continuous rounds each with fresh Karateka ready to fight. This grueling test lasts 2.5 to 4 hours of continuous combat, with challengers required to win at least 50% of their fights against opponents of similar or higher rank. Only a select few have achieved this feat throughout history, including founder Masutatsu Oyama and legendary practitioners like Steve Arneil, Shokei Matsui, and Francisco Filho.

=== Self-defense ===
Also known as Goshin Jitsu, the specific self-defense techniques of the style draw much of their techniques and tactics from Mas Oyama's study of Daitō-ryū Aiki-jūjutsu under Yoshida Kotaro. These techniques were never built into the formal grading system, and as karate itself grew increasingly sport-oriented, the self-defense training started to fall into obscurity. Today it is only practiced in a limited number of dojos. However, the proper Kyokushin Karate techniques are extremely effective when it comes to self-defense in any type of fight due to its full body contact fighting style.

=== Grading ===
Colored belts have their origin in Judo, as does the training gi, or more correctly in Japanese, dōgi or keikogi. The example below uses the rank structure used by Kyokushin Karate's West Los Angeles Branch although the order of belt colors does vary between Kyokushin groups. For example, 10th & 9th kyus in most groups wear orange belts, while in other groups in rare cases they wear red belts instead.

Kyu ranks

Belt	Rank	Colour(s)
White belt	11th kyu	White
Orange Belt	10th kyu	Orange
Orange Belt	9th kyu	Orange/White tag
Blue Belt	8th kyu	Blue
Blue Belt	7th kyu	Blue/White tag
Yellow Belt	6th kyu	Yellow
Yellow Belt	5th kyu	Yellow/White tag
Green Belt	4th kyu	Green
Green belt	3rd kyu	Green/White tag
Brown Belt	2nd kyu	Brown
Brown Belt	1st kyu	Brown/White tag
Black Belt	0 kyu	Black

Dan Ranks

Dan	Rank	Gold stripe(s)
Shodan (初段 or しょだん)	1st	One
Nidan (弐段 or にだん)	2nd	Two
Sandan (参段 or さんだん)	3rd	Three
Yondan (四段 or よんだん)	4th	Four
Godan (五段 or ごだん)	5th	Five
Rokudan (六段 or ろくだん)	6th	Six
Shichidan (七段 or しちだん)	7th	Seven
Hachidan (八段 or はちだん)	8th	Eight
Kudan (九段 or きゅうだん)	9th	Nine
Judan (十段 or じゅうだん)	10th	Ten

== Competition formats ==
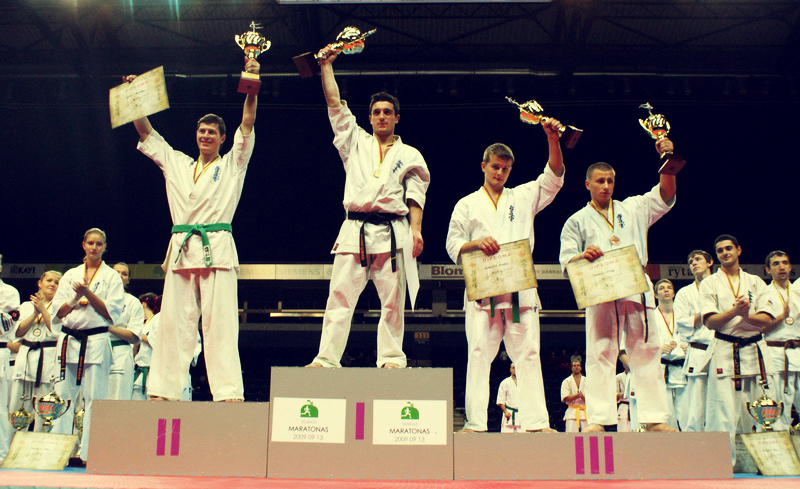
Rati Tsiteladze, winner of European 2009 Kyokushin/Shinkyokushin karate championship

Numerous tournaments are arranged by several Kyokushin organizations. Some of the most prestigious tournaments are:

- Kyokushin World Tournament Open
- Kyokushin World Cup in Weight Categories
- Kyokushin All Japan Openweight Tournament
- Kyokushin All Japan Open in Weight Categories
- Kyokushin European Openweight Championships
- Kyokushin European Championships in Weight Categories

== Internationally ==
The style has international appeal with practitioners have over the last 40 years numbered more than 12 million.

=== United States ===
Bobby Lowe opened the first Kyokushin dojo outside of Japan in Hawaii in 1957. After Lowe, Oyama ordered Miyuki Miura, Tadashi Nakamura, Shigeru Oyama and Yasuhiko Oyama to establish Kyokushin Dojos in mainland United States.

=== United Kingdom ===
Kyokushin Karate was introduced to United Kingdom by Steve Arneil. Originally from Republic of South Africa, Arneil initially intended to establish his Kyokushin Dojo there, but was requested by Mas Oyama to go to the United Kingdom to help establish Kyokushin karate there. Subsequently, he and his wife traveled to London in 1965.

British Kyokushinkai Karate was founded in 1965 after the return of Steve Arneil and Bob Boulton from Japan, where they studied Kyokushinkai in the Tokyo Hombu. Thanks to the deep knowledge and efforts of Shihan Steve Arneil (now 10th dan), the British organization has achieved great success.

=== Canada ===
Kyokushin was introduced to Canada by Tats Nakamura in 1992 at Vancouver, British Columbia. There have been practitioners in Vancouver, BC, Canada since the late 70s/early 80s where it was referred to as Kyokushinkai and operated independently. Some known black belts are Tom Blaney, Andy Puuseppä, Shawn Ho, and Georges Saint-Pierre.

Shihan Stuart Corrigal (7th degree black belt) is the current representative in Canada for Kyokushin Karate.

=== Australia ===
Kyokushin was introduced by Mamoru Kaneko and Shigeo Kato.

=== Netherlands ===
Kyokushin was introduced to Netherlands by Jon Bluming and Kenji Kurosaki. On January 2, 1962, Jon Bluming, on behalf of Masutatsu Oyama, creates the first European karate association, called the NKA (Netherlands Karate Association). Under his leadership, the new school quickly gained strength and popularity. In the late 1970s, Jon Bluming leaves the leadership of the organization to his students, and he himself creates a new organization, Kyokushin Budokai Karate.

Kyokushin is integral part of Dutch martial arts scene, as it laid foundation for "Dutch-style Kickboxing", advocated by entities like Mejiro Gym and Chakuriki Gym.

=== Germany ===
There are various associations at national level in Germany today, including the KKD (Kyokushinkai Karate Germany) and the DKO (German Kyokushin Organization) and the IKOK-D (International Karate Organization Kyokushinkaikan Germany). These are not automatically in the IKO1 on an international level, so the IKOK-D is in the IKO1 (Kyokushinkaikan Honbu) and the DKO in the WKO/IKO2 (Midori).

=== Nepal ===
Daman Basnet is the founder chairman of Nepal. Academy of Kyoukushin Karate (NAKK) He was appointed as a representative of Nepal from International Karate organization Kyoukushin Kai-kan Japan. For the past many decades, he has been devoted in Kyokushin Karate and had also organized many tournaments in Nepal. He has participated in many international competitions, some of his accomplishments are: He was selected as a Referee in 7th Asian Open Karate Tournament, held in India in 1995 and 30th All Japan Open Karate Tournament held in Japan in 1997. He was also honored as Observer in Australian Tournament 1997, World Cup 96, Japan and had also taken his students to compete and many more. He is now devoted in producing students of International Standard.

=== Brazil ===
Kyokushin was introduced to Brazil by Shihan Tanakain 1968. After Hombu dojo send Seiji Isobe. Isobe had been operating a Kyokushin Dojo in Fukui, established on September 20, 1972 – when Mas Oyama offered Isobe the mission of promoting and setting up a dojo network in South America. That same year, Seiji Isobe permanently moved to Brazil and became the head of Kyokushin in South America.

IKO1 (headed by Shokei Matsui, in which Isobe represents Brazil at international level) and Seiwakai Karate (headed by Ademir da Costa) are the most prominent styles of Knockdown Karate in Brazil.

=== Poland ===
Andrzej Drewniak is credited for bringing Kyokushin to Poland. Fascinated by karate, he founded the first Polish Karate Kyokushin section at AZS in Krakow in 1972. In 1974 he became the Polish middleweight champion in kyokushin karate. In the same year he went to a training camp in the Netherlands, where he passed the 1st dan exam, becoming the first Polish holder of a black belt and the title of Kyokushin karate sensei. In 1979, he became a co-founder of the Polish Karate Association, of which he has been a long-term vice-president.

Thanks to the support of Loek Hollander, the president of the European Karate Kyokushinkai Organization, he received an annual scholarship and an invitation to Japan, but only after six years, secretly from the political and sports authorities, he managed to go to Tokyo. At the end of his stay in Japan, he obtained the 4th dan, after 15 months of training under Sosai Masutatsu Ōyama, where he was the only Polish uchideshi.

Most Kyokushin karate clubs, regardless of their affiliation to world organizations, are also concentrated in the Kyokushin Commission of the Polish Karate Association (KK PZK / Komisji Kyokushin Polskiego Związku Karate) under which inter-organizational competitions of the rank of the Polish Championships and the Macro-region Championships are held.

The "World Oyama Karate"-style, founded by Shigeru Ōyama (10th dan) – has its largest concentration of practitioners in Poland, with largest number of clubs in the world. After Shigeru Ōyama retired from the leadership of the organization, hanshi Jan Dyduch (8th dan) from Krakow became the director of the organization (OYAMA International Karate Federation), who is also the leader of the Polish organization.

=== Hungary ===
In Hungary, István Adámy and Kálmán Furkó are credited for establishing Kyokushin in the country. In 1977, István Adámy received the 1st Dan Black in Kyokushin and was appointed branch leader of Hungary by IKO. Kálmán Furkó obtained his first dan degree in 1978 and became a shihan in Szolnok in 1984.

The development of domestic Kyokushin started in 1976. By the mid-1980s, there were nearly ten thousand practitioners of Kyokushin Karate in Hungary. Since then, Kyokushin has been one of the most popular karate styles in Hungary. István Adámy and Kálmán Furkó worked together until the political problems in IKO, following death of Mas Oyama. Since then, they have been on separate paths, but working towards the same goal.

Hungary is particular for hosting the Ibutz Oyama Cup, which was held three times between 1983 and 1986 at the National Sports Arena in Budapest. The tournament was held in three different weight classes. Kyokushin founder Masutatsu Ōyama first visited Hungary in 1983 and was also involved in overseeing the next two tournaments.

=== Russia ===
The founder of Kyokushinkai karate in the USSR is Alexander Ivanovich Tanyushkin. While in Poland on a business trip, Tanyushkin met Andrzej Drewniak in Krakow and began to practice karate with him. After some time, having learned about the existence of Kyokushinkai style karate, Tanyushkin and Drewnyak wrote a letter to Masutatsu Oyama and, on his instructions, began to cooperate with the President of the European Kyokushinkai Organization, Loek Hollander. Tanyushkin opened the first section of Kyokushinkai in the USSR in Moscow in 1973. By the end of the 1970s, a school had formed in the country with representatives in all major regions.

After the almost 10-year ban on karate was lifted in 1989, Tanyushkin established the Kyokushinkai Federation of the USSR. The creation of such a federation was a huge step forward for the development of martial arts in the USSR.

During the period of work of the national organization, Kyokushinkai karate entered the country's sports classification system as an official sport (1990), and development reached the international level. In 1993, the Kyokushinkai Federation of Russia was one of the first to join the new International Karate Federation (IFK), headed by Hansi Steve Arneil (now 10th dan). On behalf of IFK, on the basis of the Russian national organization, the Eurasian Committee (EAC) was created, representing IFK in the territory of the former USSR. It was headed by S. Stepanov (now 5 dan Kyokushin-kan). The Committee existed until 1998, having held 6 international class "A" tournaments during this time.

After the death of Masutatsu Oyama in 1994 and the split of the Kyokushinkai, from the late 90s, other Kyokushin Federations began to develop in Russia, representing various international organizations. Now in Russia they are working:

- Federation of Kyokushin Karate of Russia (FKKR), representing the World Shinkyokushinkai Organization, WKO, led by Kenji Midori
- Russian National Federation of Kyokushinkai Karate (RNFKK), representing the International Kyokushinkai Organization, IKO, led Shokei Matsui
- Federation of Kyokushinkaikan of Russia (FKR), representing the International Kyokushinkai Organization, IKO, led by Shokei Matsui (until 2013 – Federation of Kyokushinkai Karate of Russia)
- Russian Kyokushinkai Federation (FKR), representing the International Kyokushinkai Federation, IFK, led by Steve Arneil л
- Federation of Kyokushinkan Karate of Russia (FKKR), representing the International Organization of Kyokushinkau, KI, led by Hatsuo Royama

These five Federations are united in the Kyokushin Association of Russia, accredited by the Ministry of Sports and headed by Yu. P. Trutnev (currently Vice Prime Minister of the Government of Russia, Plenipotentiary Representative of the President of the Russian Federation in the Far East).

Some of these organizations (in particular, the Kyokushin Federation of Russia, the Russian Kyokushinkaikan Karate Union, etc.) are members of the All-Style Karate Federation of Russia. In addition, some of these organizations (in particular, the Russian Kyokushin Association, the Russian Kyokushin Karate Federation, the Russian Kyokushin Karate-do Federation, the Russian Kyokushin Federation, the Russian Kyokushin Federation, etc.) are members of the Russian Union of Martial Arts.

=== Lithuania ===
Large majority of Kyokushin Clubs in Lithuania belong to Kenji Midori's WKO Shin-Kyokushin (formerly IKO-2) organization. Currently, there are two IKO-1 clubs Samurajus in Marijampolė and IchiGeki Sports Club in Vilnius.

=== Bulgaria ===
Bulgaria is well known in the KYOKUSHIN KARATE world since two Bulgarian karatekas had proven their quality in a numerous international, European and world championships.

Zahari Damyanov: 4 times European and absolute world champion. Ivanka Popova: Absolute European champion.

=== Spain ===
There are a large number of Kyokushin practitioners in Spain, especially on the Mediterranean coast. The main organisations operating in this country are the IKO1 of Matsui, the Shinkyokushinkai, and the WKB. Of these, the WKB is the one with the greatest presence and expansion in the Spanish territory. The most outstanding fighter in Spain is Alejandro Navarro.

=== Singapore and SEA ===
Kyokushin was introduced to Singapore and of most of South East Asia by Shihan Peter Chong. Chong had established the first Kyokushin Dojo in Singapore in 1968, which was not registered with the Singapore Karate Association at the time.

=== Iran ===
Iranian Kyokushin fighters have been successful in top-level competition. In particular, Iran is highly successful in Kyokushin World Tournament Open hosted by IKO3 / Matsushima Group.

=== India ===
Hanshi Shivaji Ganguly is the Founder-President of Kyokushinkai India. He has been responsible to teaching Kyokushin Karate in India since 1980. He is a direct Disciple of Sosai Mas Oyama and has completed several Uchi Deshi Camps under Sosai. He has also attended several Branch Chief Camps all over the world. During the height of Kyokushin's Popularity he has acted as an international Referee at several World Championships. After Sosai's Death and the splintering of the main Organisation Hanshi Shivaji Ganguly served as chairperson of WKO Shinkyokushin for 16 years. Today he has his own International Organisation with many Asian and World Champion Fighters, the World Karate Council Mkk, which has more than 15 countries under its umbrella.

=== Slovakia ===
To Slovakia, Kyokushin was introduced by Norbert Rácz (now 5. dan) in 1994. Norbert Rácz is the Chairman of the Slovak Kyokushin Karate Association from 1998.

=== Central America & the Caribbean ===
Kyokushin Karate was initially practiced by Costa Rican individuals who learned from Tadashi Nakamura in the USA. This eventually led to Mas Oyama to name Mr. Antonio Gonzalez as Branch Chief in 1984. Shihan Gonzalez has been teaching until this day in Costa Rica and holds a 7th Dan.

Dr. Gessi Krame from Mexico started studying Goju Ryu with Gogen Yamaguchi, who later introduced Oyama to Krame. Shihan Krame passed away in 2010. Various kyokushin organizations co-exists in Mexico.

In Puerto Rico, Mas Oyama named Luis Torregrosa as the IKO branch chief. Mr. Torregrosa continues to be in this position and currently holds the rank of 7th Dan.

Honduras became a WKO Shinkyokushin member in 2013 when Nestor Cubas Alvarado first introduced the style after two trips he made to Japan in 2009 and 2012 to train at the So-Honbu Dojo under Midori Kenji and Kensaku Yamamoto. Shihan Cubas opened a dojo in Guatemala as of 2023.

== Kyokushin organizations and derivative styles ==
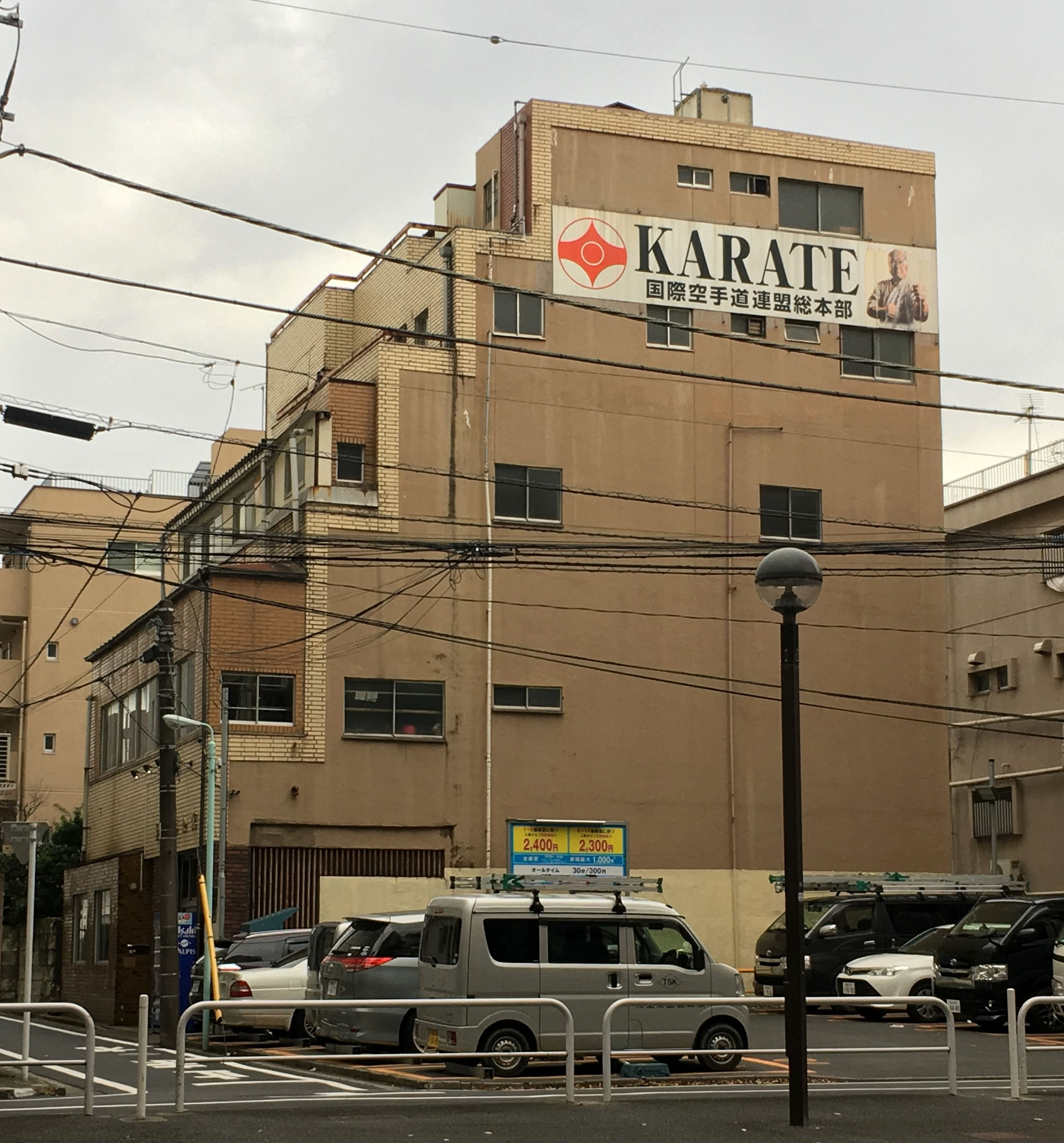
Kyokushinkaikan, General Headquarters of the International Karatedo Federation, situated at Nishiikebukuro, Toshima-ku, Tokyo

=== Kyokushin organizations ===
After Oyama's death, several different Kyokushin organizations began to emerge in Japan and beyond.

==== International Karate Organization ====
Internationally, the name of the original organization is/has been carried by multiple organizations:

- IKO Sosai Kyokushinkaikan was renamed KWO (Kyokushin World Organization) Mas Oyama in 2020 – This organization is run by the Oyama family who inherited it from the late Mas Oyama, the founder of Kyokushin Kaikan. Kikuko Oyama (also known as Kuristina Oyama), the third daughter of Mas. Oyama is the current Custodian of his estate. Hanshi Flemming Jinzen Schrøter (8th dan), from Denmark is the Kaicho (President) of the organization and Shihan Aleksandr Anferov (6th dan) of Russia is the Fuko Kaicho (Vice-President).
- IKO Kyokushinkaikan / Kyokushin Matsui Group (IKO) – Following Mas Oyama's passing, Shokei Matsui (then 5th dan) was named by Sosai as his successor in his will, just days before his passing. Many questioned why someone who was junior to many other more senior members, and young (he was only 39 at the time) would be put in charge. These questions among others led to the will being challenged and later found invalid by the Japanese courts. In the years since, many high-level disciples of Oyama left to form their own organization. Because of that IKO lost much of the influence they once wielded, but has gained some of it back recently. One need only look at Kyokushin World Tournaments from other organizations to recognize this. At the 5th World Tournament competitors from 105 countries competed. During the 2019 World Tournaments, IKO had competitors from just 38 countries, due to invitation standard. The Shinkyokushin organization by comparison had competitors from 71 countries the same year. IKO is known in Kyokushin circles for their refusal to cooperate with or recognize other Kyokushin organizations, treating them as illegitimate. The founder and current CEO is the successor of Mas Oyama as the head of the organization, Kancho Shokei Matsui (8th dan). The chairman of the international committee is Shihan Yuzo Goda (9th dan), members of the committee are also Seiji Isobe (8th dan) from Brazil, Kenny Uytenbogaardt (8th dan) from South Africa, and Katsuhito Gorai (7th dan) from USA.
- IKO Matsushima (IKO-3) – established in 1998, it is led by Yoshikazu Matsushima.
- Kyokushin Karate Tezuka Group (IKO-4) – founded by Toru Tezuka, led by Yoshimichi Mori.
- All Japan Kyokushin Union / Kyokushin Rengōkai (IKO-5 Kyokushinkaikan) – a union of independent organizations, dojos, schools of individual shihan and sensei. Currently, the chairman of the organization is Yasuhiro Shichinohe (8th Dan) from Japan, with Shigeru Tabata (8th Dan) as his deputy.
- IKO Kyokushinkaikan Sakamoto Group – established by Shigenori Sakamoto. Currently, it does not belong to any organization, and is conducting its own activities in Tokyo, Kanagawa, Tochigi, Gunma, Fukui in Japan, and overseas in Iran, Pakistan, India, Chile, etc.
- IKO Kyokushinkaikan World So-Kyokushin (shortened to "So-Kyokushin") – led by Daigo Ohishi
- IKO World Kyokushin Kaikan – is a general incorporated association established in 2018 by the Kyokushin Kaikan in the Kyushu area. Led by Ryuko Take
- IKO World Zen-Kyokushin – is a general incorporated association established in 2018 by Soshi Kazuyuki Hasegagawa and led by Takuma Koketsu
- IKO Nakamura – Founded by Makoto Nakamura and led by his son Masanaga Nakamura

==== Other major Japanese organizations ====
Other Japanese Kyokushin organizations that do not use the official name "IKO" and "Kyokushinkaikan".

- NPO World Karate Organization Shinkyokushinkai (aka "WKO", also formerly IKO2) – led by Kenji Midori is likely the largest Kyokushin organization today. It can be difficult to gauge the actual size of various organizations, but based on the number of countries participating in the various Kyokushin organizations world tournaments, Shinkyokushinkai is likely the largest. They fielded competitors from 71 countries during their World Tournament in 2019, while IKO-1, who claims to be the largest had only had 38 countries competing.
- Kyokushin-Kan International (KI) – Founded by Kaicho Hatsuo Royama & headed by Kancho Hiroto Okazaki
- IBMA (International Budo-Man Association) Kyokushin Karate Masuda Dojo – headed by Akira Masuda.
- KWU (Kyokushin World Union) – an organization founded on October 12, 2011. It was established to replace the Kyokushin-Kan Alliance founded by Hatsuo Royama. The original Kyokushin-kan was established by Hatsuo Royama following his displeasure with Shokei Matsui's leadership of IKO1. With the help of Hiroto Okazaki and others, Royama established the Kyokushin-kan International Honbu in December 2002. The goal of the organization is to follow "Kyokushin's original spirit which Oyama envisioned."
- Kyokushin Budo Karate Organization Kyokushin Kenbukai – led by Masahiro Kaneko.

==== Major organizations outside Japan ====
- IFK (International Federation of Karate) – Established by Steve Arneil and British Karate Kyokushinkai (BKK) in 1991, following an exodus from Oyama's IKO.
- KWF (Kyokushin World Federation) – founded by Shihan Loek Hollander (10th dan) from the Netherlands, serving as the honorary president of KWF for years, who died on February 16, 2020. The current president of the organization is shihan Antonio Pinero (9th dan) from Spain, and the vice president is Hristo Traikov (7th dan) from Bulgaria.
- IBK (International Budokai Kan) – founded by former IKO member Jon Bluming. Originally BKK (Budo Kai Kan) from 1980, the name was changed to IBK in 1996. Advocates "Kyokushin Budokai", which focuses on self-defense, with emphasis on judo-like throws.
- IBU KyodoKyokushin – Organisation base in Poland and led by Kancho Maciej Misiak (former Oyama family Branch Chief). 75 member countries including Japan are gather in this Federation.
- WIBK (World Independent Budokai Kan) – founded by former IKO member and prize-winner of 2nd World Championship (1979) Bernard Creton (10th dan) in 2012. Registered as Non-profit organization in Switzerland. One of department of WIBK develops kyokushinkai.
- Internationale Budo Kai – headed by Gerard Gordeau (9th dan), in Poland as the Polish Federation Budokai Karate Institute (IBK) – headed by shihan Artur Więzowski (6th dan) from Ciechanowiec.
- IKAK (International Karate Alliance KyokushinRyu), founded by Peter Chong.
- AIKKA (All India Kyokushin Karate Association), an organization founded in 2009, by Shihan Mahadeb Bramha under affiliated by IKO World Zenkyokushin.
- WKB (World Kyokushin Budokai), an organization that complies with IBK rules, is led by Pedro Roiz. It is represented in 52 countries, with a special presence in Europe.
- KKFI (Kyokushin Karate Foundation of India), an organization founded in 2013, led by Vasant Kumar Singh.
- WAKKU (World All Kyokushin Karate Union), an organization founded in 2014, by Seiji Kanamura and Hanshi Hussein Suleiman.
- American Kyokushin Karate Organization (AKKO)

The American Kyokushin Karate Organization (AKKO) was founded in 1997 by Don Buck following the death of Masutatsu Oyama. It continues earlier Kyokushin development in the United States dating back to 1957, when Buck established one of the first dojos in San Francisco. AKKO was created to preserve and promote Kyokushin karate according to Oyama's teachings. The organization operates dojos in the United States and internationally.

=== Derivative styles ===
Kyokushin has had an influence on many other styles:

- Ashihara Karate – founded by Hideyuki Ashihara. Places emphasis on self-defense and Tai Sabaki.
- Enshin Karate – competitive variant of Ashihara Karate, founded by Jōkō Ninomiya.
- Seidokaikan – traditional full contact karate derived from Kyokushin by Kazuyoshi Ishii. Seidokaikan organized the first professional full contact karate tournament named the Karate World Cup. The Karate World Cup had special extension rounds; if the judge's decision was deadlocked after an extension round, the rules then allowed face strikes with fighters donning boxing gloves (kickboxing). The founder would later establish the Professional Kickboxing promotion K-1.
- Seidō juku – founded by Tadashi Nakamura, the main dojo is located in New York, USA.
- Satojuku – established by Katsuaki Sato in 1977. It is a similar style to Kyokushin, but emphasizes precise knockdown techniques over techniques designed to injure or "knock-out" one's opponent. Describing his art in 1987, Satō wrote, "Odo means the way champions must behave. It is based on humane feelings and courtesy, on being honorable, on being devoid of selfishness or bias. It is the antithesis of any martial art that relies only on force to conquer an opponent."
- Shidōkan – founded by Yoshiji Soeno.
- Seiwakai – founded by Ademir da Costa, this style is mainly based in Brazil. Seiwakai is characterized as an aggressive style, with a fighting strategy aimed at achieving victory by knockout.
- World Oyama – established by Shigeru Oyama in the United States. The entity is currently headed by his younger brother, Yasuhiko Oyama, who operates out of Birmingham, Alabama. Has a significant presence in Poland, where the organization is headed by Hanshi Jan Dyduch (8th Dan).
- Sei Budokai – headed by Hanshi Leonardo Voinescu (8th dan Sei Budokai, 4th dan Judo, 5th dan Kyokushin Budokai) from Romania. The honorary president is Hanshi Dave Jonkers (9th dan Sei Budokai, 9th dan Ashihara Karate, 5th dan judo) from the Netherlands, and the honorary technical director is Shihan Semmy Schilt (6th dan Ashihara Karate, 6th dan Sei Budokai) from the Netherlands.

Kokondo is derived from Kyokushin, albeit without a strong focus on competition with the emphasis rather on realistic goshin-jutsu (self-defense). Some styles originating in Kyokushin (Jushindo, Kūdō, Zendokai) have changed to mixed martial arts rules.

== Influence ==
Kyokushin has influenced other styles, especially the knockdown karate competition format. Karate styles that originated in Kyokushin, such as Ashihara Karate, Budokaido, Godokai, Enshin Karate, Seidō juku, Musokai, Shidōkan, World Oyama and Seidokaikan, are also knockdown styles and use slight variations of the competition rules.

Many top kickboxers such as Andy Hug, Francisco Filho and Masahiro Yamamoto- have started in knockdown karate. The influence of Kyokushin can be seen in the K-1 kickboxing tournament that originated out of the Seidokaikan karate organization, which is an offshoot from Kyokushin.

Kyokushin is the basis of glove karate, a knockdown karate format wearing boxing gloves and allowing punches to the head. Glove karate rules are used in Kyokushin Karate Iran.

== In popular culture ==
Kyokushin Karate has featured in following videogames:

- The move sets of Ryu and Ken from Capcom's Street Fighter franchise are based on Kyokushin. (Note: In-universe, the style of the two is identified as "Ansatsuken". The two characters are also referred as "Shotos" for Shotokan Karate, which the manuals for international SNES releases of Street Fighter II identifies Ryu and Ken for using. Shotokan is one of the parent styles of Kyokushin Karate.) Both characters are based on notable Kyokushin practitioners from late 60s/early 70s, Ryu is based on Yoshiji Soeno and Ken is based on Terutomo Yamazaki. The characters are influenced by the real-life counterparts' depictions in manga Karate Baka Ichidai.
- In Namco's Tekken series, Jin Kazama uses Kyokushin Karate as his fighting style, starting from Tekken 4 and subsequent titles. (Note: Despite appearing in prior games, Tekken 3 and Tekken Tag Tournament, where Jin Kazama was practitioner of fictional Mishima-style Karate, plot developments lead to Jin renouncing his family style and to take up Kyokushin Karate.)
- Kyokushin Karate has served as the basis for the Kyokugenryu Karate, a fictional martial art from SNK Playmore's Art of Fighting, Fatal Fury, and King of Fighters series. Kyokugenryu (lit. "the extreme style") and Kyokushin are similar sounding names, and the family patriarch Takuma Sakazaki is modelled after Kyokusin founder Mas Oyama. Besides Takuma, characters Ryo Sakazaki, Robert Garcia, Yuri Sakazaki and Marco Rodrigues use this style.
- Torao Onigawara in the arcade game The Fallen Angels is a master of Kyokushin Karate.

A trilogy of films starring Sonny Chiba and directed by Kazuhiko Yamaguchi were produced in Japan between 1975 and 1977: Champion of Death, Karate Bearfighter and Karate for Life. Chiba plays Master Oyama, who also appears in two of the films.

The James Bond movie You Only Live Twice, starring Sean Connery, was filmed largely in Japan and featured a karate demonstration by a number of well-known Kyokushin students, including Shigeo Kato (who introduced Kyokushin to Australia and was the original teacher of Shokei Matsui) and Akio Fujihira.

== Literature ==
- Masutatsu Oyama. What Is Karate? HarperCollins (1966) ISBN 0-87040-147-5
- Masutatsu Oyama. Vital Karate. Japan Publications Trading company. Tokyo, San Francisco. 1967–1974. ISBN 0-87040-143-2
- Masutatsu Oyama. This Is Karate. Japan Publications. (1973) ISBN 0-87040-254-4
- Masutatsu Oyama. Advanced Karate. Japan Publications (2000) ISBN 0-87040-001-0
- B. Lowe. Mas Oyama's Karate. ISBN 0-668-01140-8

== See also ==
- Comparison of karate styles
