= Jon Bluming =

Dutch martial artist

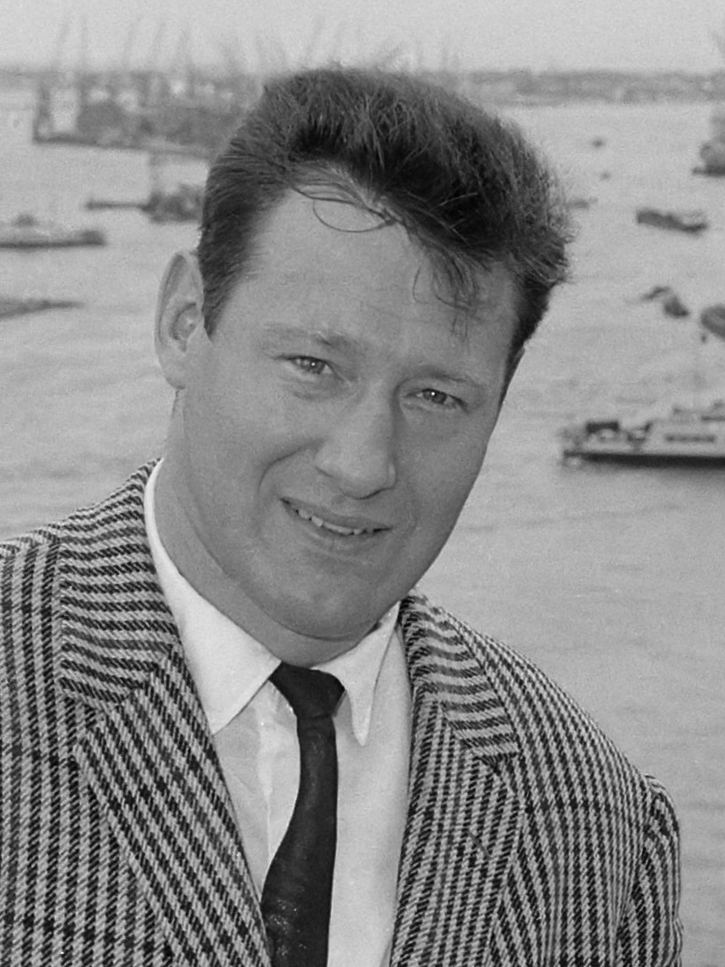
- Bluming in 1965
- Born: Johannes Cornelius Bluming; 6 February 1933; Amsterdam, Netherlands
- Died: 17 December 2018 (aged 85); De Bilt, Netherlands
- Rank: 10th Dan Black Belt in Kyokushin Karate; 10th Dan Black Belt in Hapkido; 9th Dan Black Belt in Judo

Other information
- Notable students: Otti Roethof, Azuma Takashi
- Website: http://www.jonbluming.nl/

Johannes Cornelius Bluming (6 February 1933 – 17 December 2018) was a Dutch martial artist, instructor and actor. Known as a pioneer in a variety of martial arts, Bluming held 9th dan in Judo, 10th dan in Kyokushinkai Karate and 10th dan in Hapkido. He was also the coach of two-time Olympic champion Willem Ruska.

== Career ==
=== Early life and training ===
Born in Amsterdam, Bluming grew up in a Jewish neighbourhood during the Nazi occupation of the Netherlands. When he was 13 he started to train in Boxing, but three years later he applied for the Marines to escape poverty and was accepted to the bootcamp in Doorn in July 1949. When the Korean War broke out in 1950, Bluming was sent to Korea as part of the van Heutz regiment. He received several decorations and was wounded twice, having to be moved to Tokyo to recover. It was there where he came in contact with Asian martial arts, witnessing a Judo exhibition by Kyuzo Mifune at the Kodokan school in March 1953. Deciding to try Judo when he returned to Holland, Bluming meanwhile trained Hapkido in Korea.

Back in the Netherlands in November, Bluming trained in Judo under Eddy Roosterman and the renowned G. F. M. Schutte at the Tung-Yang Club, gaining his black belt in three years. In 1956, Bluming was appointed coach of the Dutch national team, which won the European championships in Bellevue. The following year he received the 3rd Dan from Tokio Hirano by beating 75 Judokas in 26 minutes, one of them being another 3rd Dan, in a tournament in Ermelo, in which Bluming also fought with an injured toe. The victory got him invited to teach at a police dojo in Berlin, Germany. After winning some tournaments, he moved to Halifax, Nova Scotia, Canada in 1958, teaching Judo at the Dalhousie University. However, after finding himself struggling to defeat an American 4th Dan while in United States, he finally moved to Tokyo, Japan in 1959.

=== Career in Japan ===
Upon his arrival to Japan, Bluming was accepted in the Kodokan Institute, where he trained under names like Toshiro Daigo, Yoshimi Osawa and Kazuo Ito. His tenure was successful, winning all of his matches and reaching a record of points only matched by French 5th Dan Maurice Quell. Being satisfied with his throws, he moved with the renowned Yaichihyōe Kanemitsu to perfect his groundwork, and around the same time he complemented his Judo training by learning Karate, Aikido, Iaijutsu, Bojutsu and Kendo under masters like Takaji Shimizu and Ichitaro Kuroda. in Karate, he first joined the Shotokan school, but soon switched to Kyokushin, which was more to his liking.

During his time in Tokyo he lived with Donn F. Draeger and Robert W. Smith, and was in Draeger's Judo class, where popular opinion placed the 25 best Judo practitioners in Tokyo. Bluming gained his 4º dan after beating Akio Kaminaga by choke and Isao Inokuma by uchi mata makikomi. He and Draeger also trained in Bojutsu, Iaijutsu and Kendo with Tokyo police instructors Takaji Shimizu and Ichitaro Kuroda. Also under Donn's tutelage, Bluming underwent training to move to a heavier weight class, ascending from his natural 176 to 224 lb (80 to 102 kg). This brought more success, as Bluming replaced Inokuma in a gonin gake (a Judo challenge against five opponents of 3rd Dan or higher) and accomplished a shocking record of four seconds.

=== Return to Europe and death ===
After his training in Japan, Bluming received a letter from the Netherlands in which Schutte asked him to come back and teach at the old dojo and the Amateurs Association for a year on contract. Bluming went back to teach his old friends, make some new ones, and possibly participate in the 1961 World Judo Championships in Paris in December, but his career halted after the Dutch Jujitsu and Judo Association (NJJB) impeded him from joining the competition. Bluming entered a public enmity with fellow Dutch star Anton Geesink, a potential rival, whom Bluming accused of working with NJJB chief Jan Van Der Horst to leave him out. Bluming issued a public challenge to the now world champion Geesink, but the NJJB again vetoed it. He then made a match against all comers, which was attended by some 80 judoka from 1st dan to 4th dan, and he still threw them all within about four seconds in full view of the press. Even so, Geesink did not step down to fight him. After watching Geesink's victory in Paris, a frustrated Bluming retired from competition and focused only on karate and teaching instead.

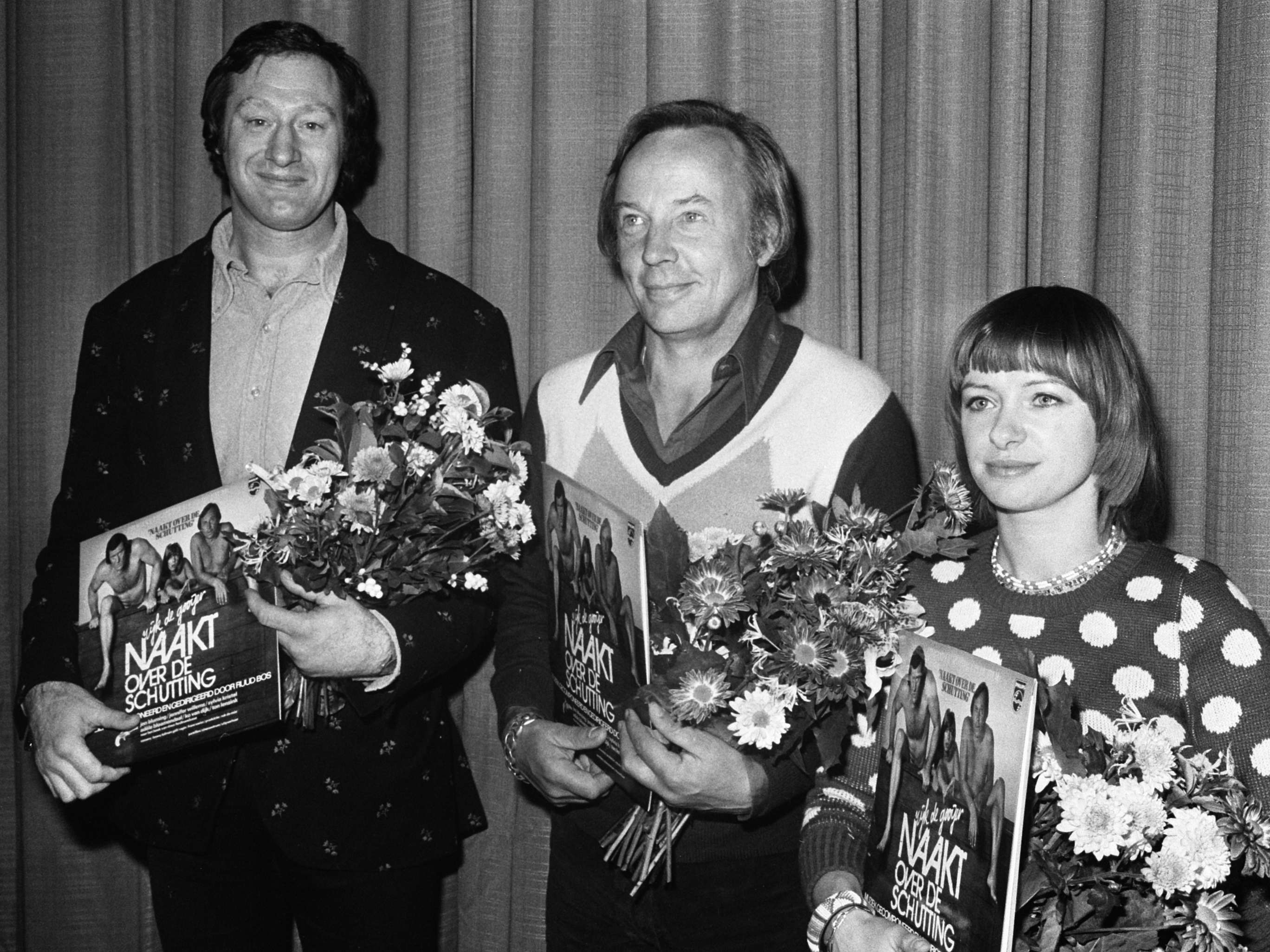
Bluming (left) at the premiere of his 1973 film Naakt over de schutting

In 1965, Bluming became the first non-Japanese to be awarded the 6º dan in karate from Masutatsu Oyama. This decision was controversial enough among Asian karatekas to force Oyama to put a challenge in a magazine, challenging any of them to a fight against Bluming in a boxing ring and promising to strip him from his black belt if the Dutchman lost. Oyama was so confident that he also promised a hefty bounty and swore to retire himself from the Kyokushin school. Only the Korean champion Kwan Mo Gun accepted the challenge, and was swiftly knocked out by Bluming via shotei. Bluming remained a close coworker of Oyama, but over time he became critical with his policies, and eventually left the school due to disagreements with him, founding his own school, Kyokushin Budokai. However, he remained a respected member of the association, being awarded the 9º dan in 1989.

Four years later, Bluming was contacted by Akira Maeda from Fighting Network Rings, a professional wrestling and mixed martial arts promotion which had a working agreement with both Oyama himself and Bluming's apprentice Chris Dolman. Through Maeda, Masutatsu offered him to return as a trainer and mediator with Rings, which Bluming accepted on the condition to expel another of his enemies, Loek Hollander, from the school.. In 1994, after Oyama's death, Bluming was awarded the 10º dan by Kenji Kurosaki.

Bluming died on December 17, 2018, in De Bilt, Netherlands.

== Notable students ==
- Azuma Takashi - founder of Daidō Juku Kūdō.
- Chris Dolman - Sambo World Champion (‘69 & ‘85) and European silver medalist (‘74) in Judo.
- Wim Ruska - World Champion (‘67 & ‘71) and Olympic Champion (2x ‘72) in Judo.
- Otti Roethof -World Champion in Karate.
- Jan Kallenbach - Gold at the 1974 European Karate Championships. Representative of Taikiken in Europe.
- Jan Plas - introduced Kickboxing in the Netherlands, and coach of many World Champions in Kickboxing.
- Johan Vos - coach of many World Champions in Kickboxing.
- Lucien Carbin - Kickboxing World champion and coach of many World Champions in Kickboxing.
- Thom Harinck - Kickboxing/Muay Thai pioneer and coach of many champions.
- Semmy Schilt - K-1, Daidō Juku Kūdō and mixed martial arts champion.
- Gilbert Yvel - mixed martial arts champion

== Filmography ==
Year	Title	Role	Notes
1966	Modesty Blaise	Hans	
1971	De Worstelaar	Leo Stefano	Short
1972	De inbreker	De Bonk	
1973	Geen paniek		
1973	Turks Fruit	Beveiliging	
1973	Naakt over de schutting	Ed Swaan	
1974	De 5 van de 4 daagse	Cornelius Hoeding	
1975	Zwaarmoedige verhalen voor bij de centrale verwarming	Jon	(segment "Zeeman Tussen Wal en Schip")
1981	Hoge hakken, echte liefde	Molkenboer	
1982	De boezemvriend	Tavern patron	
1984	Moord in extase	Man in graveyard	
1985	De ijssalon	Partisan	
1986	Field of Honor	Sergeant	
1987	De ratelrat	Drunken driver	
1990	Vicent et moi	Hirodake's bodyguard	
