= 100-man kumite =

Extreme test of physical and mental endurance in Kyokushin karate

The 100-man kumite (Japanese: hyakunin kumite) is an extreme test of physical and mental endurance in Kyokushin karate. Kumite is a form of sparring, one of the three main sections of karate training, and involves simulated combat against an opponent. The 100-man kumite consists of 100 rounds of kumite, each between one-and-a-half and two minutes in length. Normally, the karate practitioner undergoing the test will have to face similarly or higher-ranked opponents, and may face the same opponent more than once in the course of the test (depending on the number of opponents available to participate). Each opponent faced will be fresh and not fatigued or injured. Each of the rounds are done under test conditions, where either of the fighters are allowed to deliver knock out blows.

The challenge was devised by Masutatsu Oyama, the founder of Kyokushin and the first person to complete the test. He completed the 100-man kumite three times over three consecutive days. The second man to complete the test was Steve Arneil in 1965. In July 2004, a woman named Naomi Ali completed the 100-man kumite. Today it is considered a normal grading requirement to go through 20 to 40 rounds of Kumite when attempting Dan grades.

== Rules and requirements for 100-man Kumite ==
- Typically conducted under IKO (International Karate Organisation) rules
- An official adjudicator must be present
- Rounds must be a minimum of 1 and ½ minutes to 2 minutes each
- Minimum fighting time based on 1 and ½ minutes rounds would equal 150 minutes total
- The challenger must clearly win a minimum of 50% of the fights
- The fighting must be spirited and challenging (Bouts should be tournament standard)
- Opponents must be similarly or higher-ranked opponents
- Typically over 20 different fighters are gathered
- No excessive breaks from fighting
- Medical care should be on standby
- The next fighter must be fresh and ready
- The challenger must have had adequate opportunity between rounds for hydration

== List of 100-man kumites ==
1. Masutatsu Oyama (Japan) (No Proof)
2. Steve Arneil (UK/South Africa, May 21, 1965)
3. Tadashi Nakamura (Japan, October 15, 1965)
4. Shigeru Oyama (Japan, September 17, 1966) (120 in total)
5. Loek Hollander (The Netherlands, August 5, 1967)
6. John Jarvis (New Zealand, 1967)
7. Howard Collins (United Kingdom, December 1, 1972)
8. Miyuki Miura (Japan, April 13, 1973)
9. Shokei Matsui (Japan, April 18, 1986)
10. Ademir da Costa (Brazil, April 25, 1987)
11. Keiji Sampei (Japan, February 24, 1990)
12. Akira Masuda (Japan, May 19, 1991)
13. Kenji Yamaki (Japan, March 22, 1995)
14. Marius Schoeman (South Africa, March 23, 1996)
15. Francisco Filho (Brazil, March 22, 1999)
16. Hajime Kazumi (Japan, March 13, 1999)
17. Klaus Rex (Denmark, December 15, 2002)
18. Zbigniew Koszela (Canada, November 16, 2003)
19. Naomi Ali née Woods (Australia, July 4, 2004)
20. Víctor Flores (Argentina, December 8, 2004)
21. Juan Manuel Gallego (Spain, 21 January 2006)
22. César Rufo Silvestre (Spain, 3 December 2006)
23. Arthur Hovhannisyan (March 29, 2009)
24. Pouya Salehi (Iran, June 26, 2011)
25. Emmanuel Beaufils (Argentina, September 8, 2011)
26. Judd Reid (Thailand/Australia, October 22, 2011)
27. Tariel Nikoleishvili (Russia, April 26, 2014)
28. Abdullah Tarsha (Saudi Arabia, June 2, 2016)
29. Takuma Kouketsu (Japan, November 26, 2017)
30. Daniel Sanchez (Spain, March 10, 2018)
31. Junior Robert McInnes (Japan, May 28, 2018)
32. Cem Senol (Netherlands, February 22, 2020)

== Other ==
The 100-man kumite challenge has gained popularity amongst various martial art communities with other fighting styles attempting their own equivalents to this challenge. Similar rules, conditions and requirements should be followed.

- Paddy Doyle (United Kingdom, June 9, 2002) - Guinness World Record holder for Fastest 100 Man Kumite-Karate (However not Kyokushin Karate)
- Kelly Leo (United States, June, 2014) - Not officially recognised by IKO, not Kyokushin, completed 100-man kumite for a charity cause, conditions not as strict.
- Mikio Ueda (Japan, June 11, 2021) (stopped at 60 due to injury) - Officially sanctioned by IKO Kyokushin.

== See also ==
- Karateka, 1984 Broderbund video game in which the protagonist faces a series of freshly rested opponents increasing in both offensive skill and defensive strength as his own ability to survive injury dwindles
