= Peter Chong (karateka) =

Singaporean martial artist

- Born: Chong Seh Jam; 1941 (age 84–85); Singapore
- Native name: simplified Chinese: 庄之炎; traditional Chinese: 莊之炎; pinyin: Zhuāng Zhīyán
- Style: Kyokushin Karate
- Teacher: Masutatsu Oyama
- Rank: 9th dan karate

Other information
- Notable schools: IKO Kyokushinkaikan, International Karate Alliance KyokushinRyu
- Website: http://ikak.net/

Chong Seh Jam a.k.a. Peter Chong, PBM is the pioneer of Kyokushin karate in Singapore and a former Assistant Superintendent of Police in the Volunteer Special Constabulary (VSC) of Singapore.

== Early life ==
Chong was born in 1941 in a kampong at Ah Hood Road. He grew up during the Japanese occupation. As a young boy, Chong was taught Chinese martial arts by his uncle for self-defense. He would practise three times a week and also get into fights with others. Chong would also learn Judo and Taekwondo before learning about Kyokushin karate while he was working as a security guard in Metro department store.

== Karate career ==
Chong first learned of Karate from This is Karate, a book written by Kyokushin founder, Mas Oyama. In 1965, Chong sailed to Japan to train under Mas Oyama, without informing either his wife or his father of his intentions. In 1967, he received his 2nd dan blackbelt and returned to Singapore as his father was seriously ill. When he arrived, he found out that his father had already died. Thereafter, Chong left for Japan again in 1967 and reunited with Mas Oyama. He attained the rank of 3rd dan in 1968. During one summer training, Chong attempted the 100-man kumite under Mas Oyama but stopped after fighting 30 opponents.

In 1969, Chong returned to Singapore once again and officially established his own dojo, becoming the founder of Kyokushin karate in Singapore. The dojo was located in a kindegarten at 88 St. Francis Road off Serangoon Road. It was the first full-contact karate dojo in Singapore and as such, was unable to join the Singapore Karate Federation which only had sports karate.

Chong had attained 4th dan in 1972 and 5th dan by 1975, and was at that rank until at least 1979. Chong was responsible for training Inamullah Khan, pioneer of Kyokushin karate in Pakistan. In 1973, he starred in the Singaporean kungfu film Ring of Fury, but the film was not released until 2018 due to failing to clear the Board of Censors.

In 1978, Chong expanded his karate school into a society, the Singapore Oyama Karate-do Kyokushinkaikan (SOKK). In 1982, Chong along with other martial arts practitioners founded the Singapore Martial Arts Instructors Association (SMAIA). He would later become the vice president and president. Under SOKK and SMAIA, he raised funds for various charities such as the National Kidney Foundation (NKF).

By the 1980s, beside the main dojo there were dojos in the Police Reserve Unit at Mount Vernon Camp and various community centres around Singapore. Chong himself trained policemen, prison officers and members of the public. In 1988, Chong received the Pingat Bakti Masyarakat (Public Service Medal) from Ong Teng Cheong, then Deputy Prime Minister of Singapore, for services to the martial arts. He would eventually be appointed the chairman of Middle East and South East Asia of the IKO Kyokushinkainkan by Mas Oyama.

In 1992, Chong organised the Singapore Open International Tournament where participants from over 30 countries participated and popular actor and kyokushin practicitioner Dolph Lundgren and Mas Oyama attended as guests.

By 2007, the headquarters of SOKK had moved to the seventh floor of Orchard Towers. The SOKK had about 300 active members. In 2018, Chong resigned from his position as a chairman in the IKO. Chong is currently the chairman of the International Karate Alliance KyokushinRyu (IKAK) and a 9th dan in Kyokushin karate. He was promoted to that rank in April 2019.

== Volunteer Special Constabulary ==
Peter Chong joined the VSC in 1959. After training to become a police officer, he was posted to various police stations such as Joo Chiat Police Station. Chong was posted to the Police Academy in 1964 and put in charge of training the VSC and Police National Servicemen in self-defence techniques. He was also in charge of the range where VSC personnel took part in their annual shooting test.

Chong retired in 2000 as an assistant superintendent of police.

== Personal life ==
Chong is a Roman Catholic.

Chong married in 1964. Chong has two sons who are also Kyokushin karate practitioners: Jackie, 6th dan, and James, 4th dan.
