= Shigeru Oyama =

Japanese karateka (1936-2016)

- Born: July 7, 1936; Tokyo, Japan
- Died: February 14, 2016 (aged 79)
- Style: Kyokushin karate
- Teacher: Mas Oyama

Other information
- Website: www.worldoyama.com

Shigeru Oyama (大山 茂, Ōyama Shigeru; July 7, 1936 – February 14, 2016) was a karate practitioner and instructor who operated a dojo in New York for half a century. He taught Kyokushin karate for many years before forming his own organization World Oyama Karate in 1985. He was hand-picked by Mas Oyama, karate master and founder of Kyokushin karate, to spread his contact style of karate in the United States and was sent to New York City to teach in 1966. S. Oyama is acknowledged as one of the first Kyokushin stylists to successfully complete the 100-man kumite. Oyama has taught many students, including Willie Williams and Frank Clark. Of the many Japanese Kyokushin karateka who sought training under S. Oyama, Joko Ninomiya chose to stay in America to also teach, and he became branch chief for Kyokushin in Denver, CO in 1976.

== Early life ==
Shigeru Oyama was born in Tokyo, Japan, in 1936. He first saw Mas Oyama after World War II when he was nine or ten years old. He described the young karateka as being very muscular with 'very scary and strong' eyes. A friend of his father, the young Mas Oyama would come to his father's house to do his karate workout, and he frequently watched him train in the yard. Although they shared the same surname, the Oyamas were not related, but in fact young Mas Oyama changed his Korean birth name, Choi Young-Eui, because the Oyama family let him stay with them from time to time.

== Mas Oyama and karate training ==
S. Oyama started practicing karate at the age of twelve under Mas Oyama at his dojo that was referred to as Oyama Dojo and his contact style Oyama Karate. He received his black belt when he was seventeen. A typical karate class 'was usually four hours long with the last two hours being fighting.' He was one of the senior Kyokushin karateka who sparred with Mas Oyama in his younger days, and he saw the latter's first bout with a bull in Japan. S. Oyama would go on to consummate the 100-man kumite on Sept. 17, 1966. He reminisced: 'One-hundred kumite is the hardest thing I ever did in my life. It is probably the hardest thing anyone can do in the karate world. You don't beat the 65th man with your body. That's all gone by then. You beat him with your spirit.' He continued to train at what was now the Kyokushin Headquarters in Tokyo and received his 4th-degree black belt before embarking on his journey to spread Kyokushin karate in the United States.

== Move to America ==
Richard Bernard, a representative for Kyokushin in New York, requested a Japanese instructor, and Mas Oyama chose S. Oyama. Over the years, S. Oyama greatly contributed to establishing Kyokushin as one of the preeminent karate styles practiced across the globe. Many tournament champions of Kyokushin, including world champions such as Makoto Nakamura (World Open Karate Championship winner in 1979 and 1983) and Shokei Matsui (winner in 1987) were sent to S. Oyama for training before their subsequent tournament competition. By this time, he was widely acknowledged as Saiko Shihan (supreme master) or Sekai Saiko Shihan (world's supreme master) out of Kyokushin's many qualified instructors. He consolidated the U.S. Kyokushin Karate Organization in the late 1970s and became its chairman.

As the oldest remaining disciple of 'Kancho' Mas Oyama, founder and grandmaster of Kyokushin, S. Oyama was his 'best student' and ranked only below him in the entire Kyokushin hierarchy. Even after parting ways with Mas Oyama's Kyokushin organization, he continued to maintain great respect for the man, calling him his 'father, karate master, and mentor who showed him the path of life.' After dedicating five decades to teach and popularize a more modernized, practical system of karate to students around the world, Shigeru Oyama died on February 14, 2016. His organization World Oyama Karate is currently headed by his younger brother, Yasuhiko Oyama, who operates out of Birmingham, Alabama.

== Books ==
- Perfect Karate. ISBN 4-25596-043-7
- 121 Thoughts in My Life in Karatedo. ISBN 978-1-36-653940-3

== Films ==
=== Documentary ===
- The Strongest Karate (aka Fighting Black Kings)(地上最強のカラテ), Sankyo Motion Picture Company (三協映画), 1976
- The Strongest Karate Part II (地上最強のカラテ・パート2), Sankyo Motion Picture Company (三協映画), 1976
