= Howard Collins =

Welsh karateka (born 1949)

- Born: 1949 (age 76–77); Mountain Ash, Wales, United Kingdom
- Style: Kyokushin Karate
- Teacher: Masutatsu Oyama
- Rank: 8th dan karate

Other information
- Spouse: None
- Website: www.shihancollins.com

Howard Collins (born 1949) is a Welsh master of Kyokushin karate based in Sweden. He holds the rank of 8th dan (2015) and the title of Shihan. Collins learned directly from Masutatsu Oyama, founder of Kyokushin karate, and was a prominent competitor in world karate tournaments through the 1970s. He has been teaching his martial art since the 1960s, and has written several books on karate.

== Early life ==
Collins was born in 1949 in Mountain Ash, Wales, around 20 miles from Cardiff. His father died when he was eight years old. As a schoolboy, Collins played rugby and trained in athletics. He began training in Kyokushin karate at the age of 15, at the Cardiff School of Budo. It was around this time that he first read about Masutatsu Oyama and decided that he would eventually travel to Japan to train.

In 1967, Collins decided to join the London Metropolitan Police—but only three weeks after he had set off on this endeavour, his mother died. He worked in London for two years before joining the merchant navy, with the aim of working his way to Japan. Collins was 21 when he eventually left for Japan.

== Karate career ==
In 1971, Collins arrived in Japan and, at the rank of 3rd kyu, began training at the Kyokushin honbu dojo (headquarters training hall) under Oyama. On 22 October 1972, he competed in the 4th Open Karate Tournament in Tokyo, and came second after Miyuki Miura. According to Collins, he completed the 100-man kumite two years after beginning training in Japan, but a Scottish source reports 1 December 1972 as the date. In any case, he became the first person to complete the test compulsorily in one day. Collins later recalled: "At the start it was easy my condition was excellent as I had been training every day for two years. Slowly though I was becoming tired the referee would ask me if I wanted to give up (I can not print my reply). I thought what can they do, kill me. Three and a half hours later, it was all over."

In 1973, Collins returned to the United Kingdom and began teaching in British and other European dojo. He was listed at 6 ft 5 in (196 cm) in height and 198 pounds (90 kg) in weight in that year. In September 1973, Collins was ranked 3rd dan. In November 1975, he competed in Kyokushin's 1st World Tournament, but was defeated by Toshikazu Satō on a judge's decision, following several extensions and a rematch. Following an invitation from Attila Meszaros, Collins emigrated to Sweden in 1977. He competed in Kyokushin's 2nd World Tournament, in November 1979, and came fifth.

In 1980, Collins was ranked 4th dan. Oyama promoted him to the rank of 7th dan in 1993. During the World Tournament in Japan October/November 2015 or rather during the seminar afterwards, he got 8th dan. Collins has written several books, including: The Kyokushinkai Knockdown karate book (1980), The Absolute Karate: Applications of Kyokushin (1995),The Shodan (2003), and The Gateway (2004). Currently, he is the head of the Gothenburg Kyokushin dojo in Sweden.
