= Stand-up fighting =

Hand to hand combat in a standing position

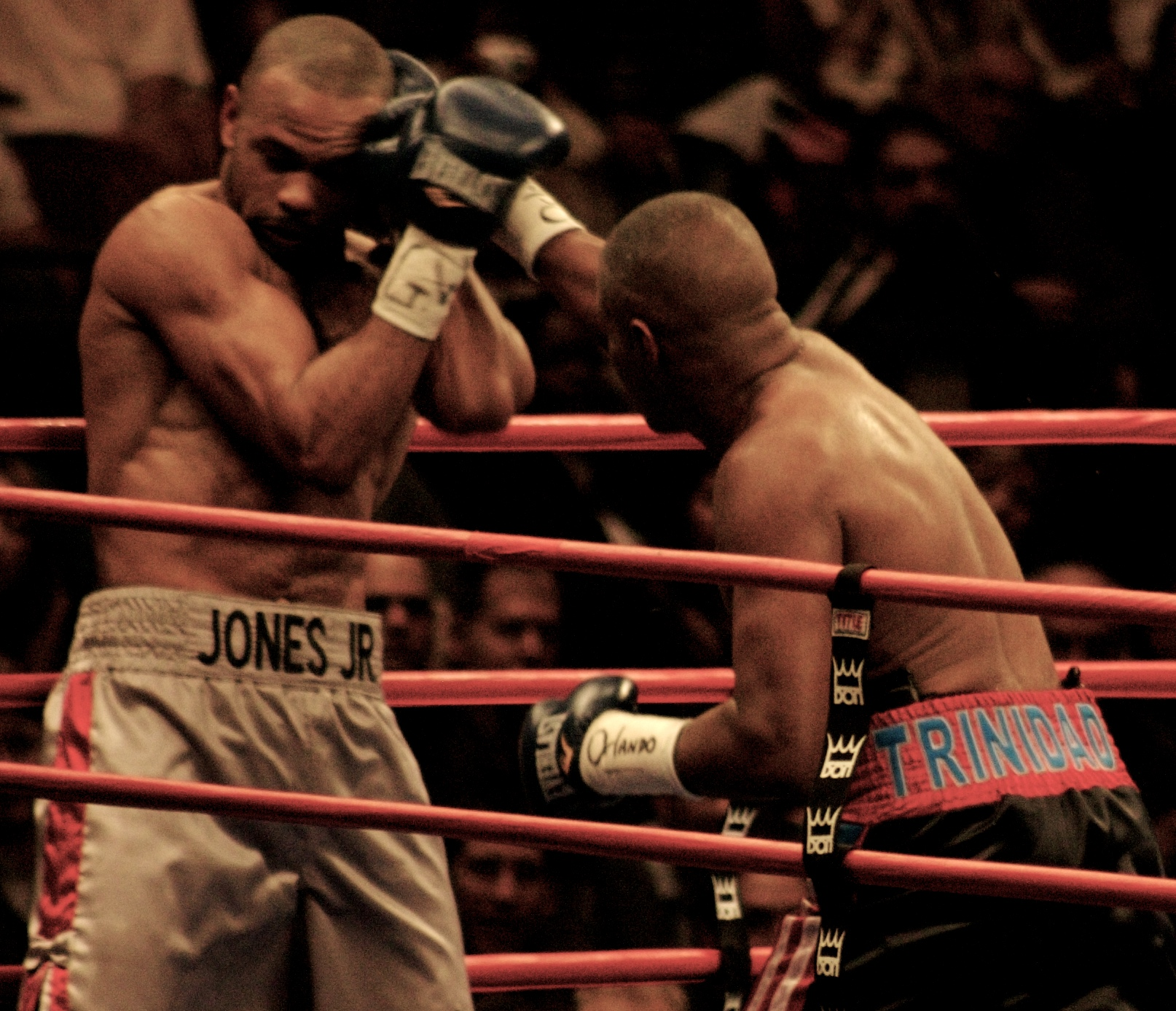
Felix Trinidad throws a punch at Roy Jones Jr. during a boxing match.

In martial arts and combat sports, stand-up fighting is hand-to-hand combat between opponents in a standing position, as distinguished from ground fighting. Clinch fighting is stand-up grappling. Fighters employ striking, including striking combinations, using either body parts or melee weapons, to incapacitate or injure the opponent. Combatants use blocking techniques to block the opponent's attacks.

Martial arts and combat sports that emphasize stand-up fighting include boxing, jōdō, karate, kendo, kickboxing, kung fu (sanda/sanshou), Muay Thai, savate, silat, and Taekwondo.

== Stand-up fighting distances ==
The nature of the stand-up fighting depends on whether the combatants are unarmed or use melee weapons. Batons become less effective at short, especially clinching range, where they cannot be swung properly. Knives on the other hand do not need as much thrusting space to generate damage. In stand-up fighting without melee weapons, it is possible to separate the distances between the combatants according to which strikes can reach the opponent.

The comfort zone is a non-combat distance from which it is not possible to kick the opponent without closing the distance considerably. From this zone the combatant might carefully close in on the opponent to engage with strikes.

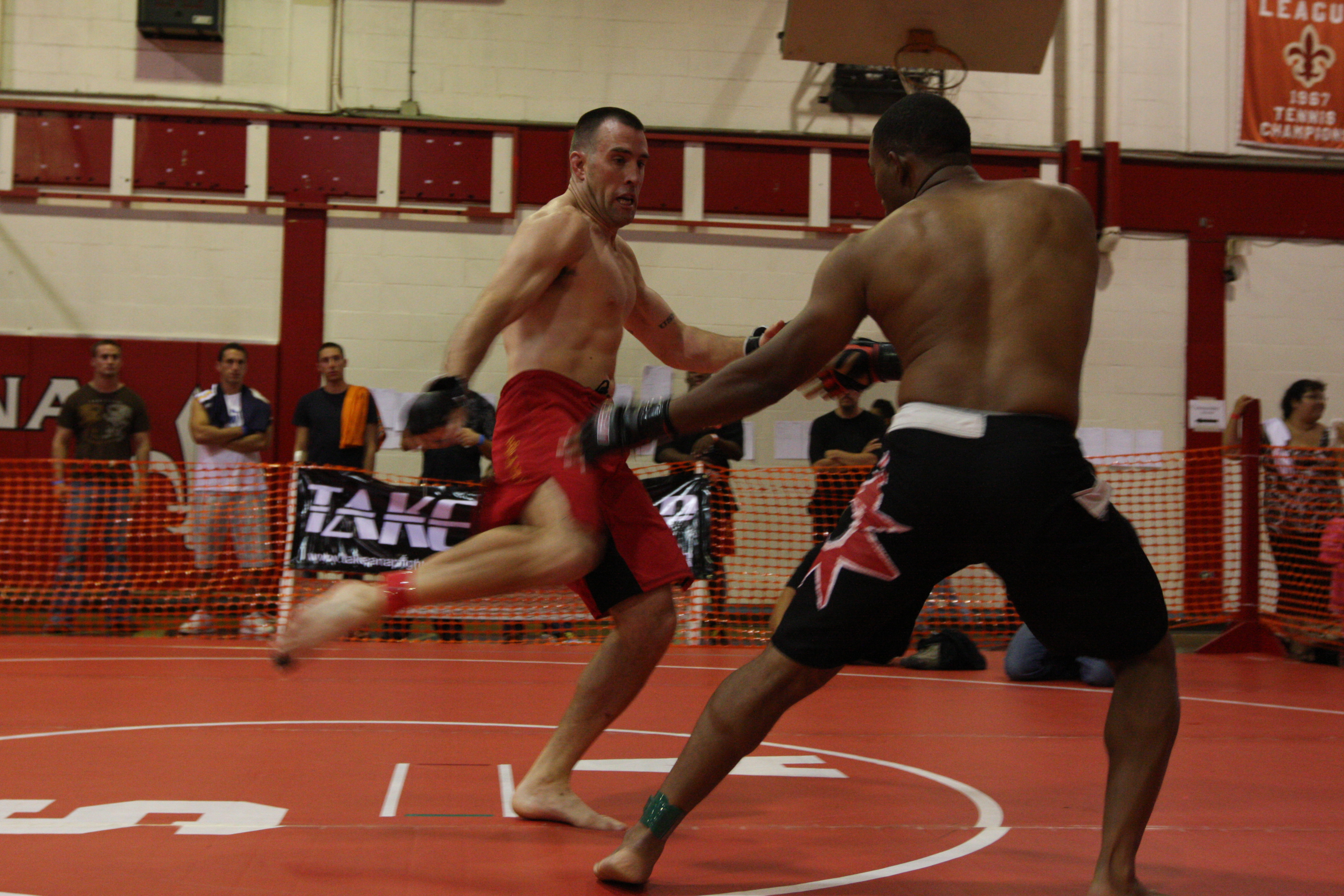
Kicking distance: Fighters in kicking distance

Kicking distance: The kicking distance is the most distant unarmed fighting position in which consistent contact can be made with the opponent. The combatants can use far-reaching quick kicks to the legs, body or head of the opponent. Martial arts such as Taekwondo emphasize the kicking distance in fighting.

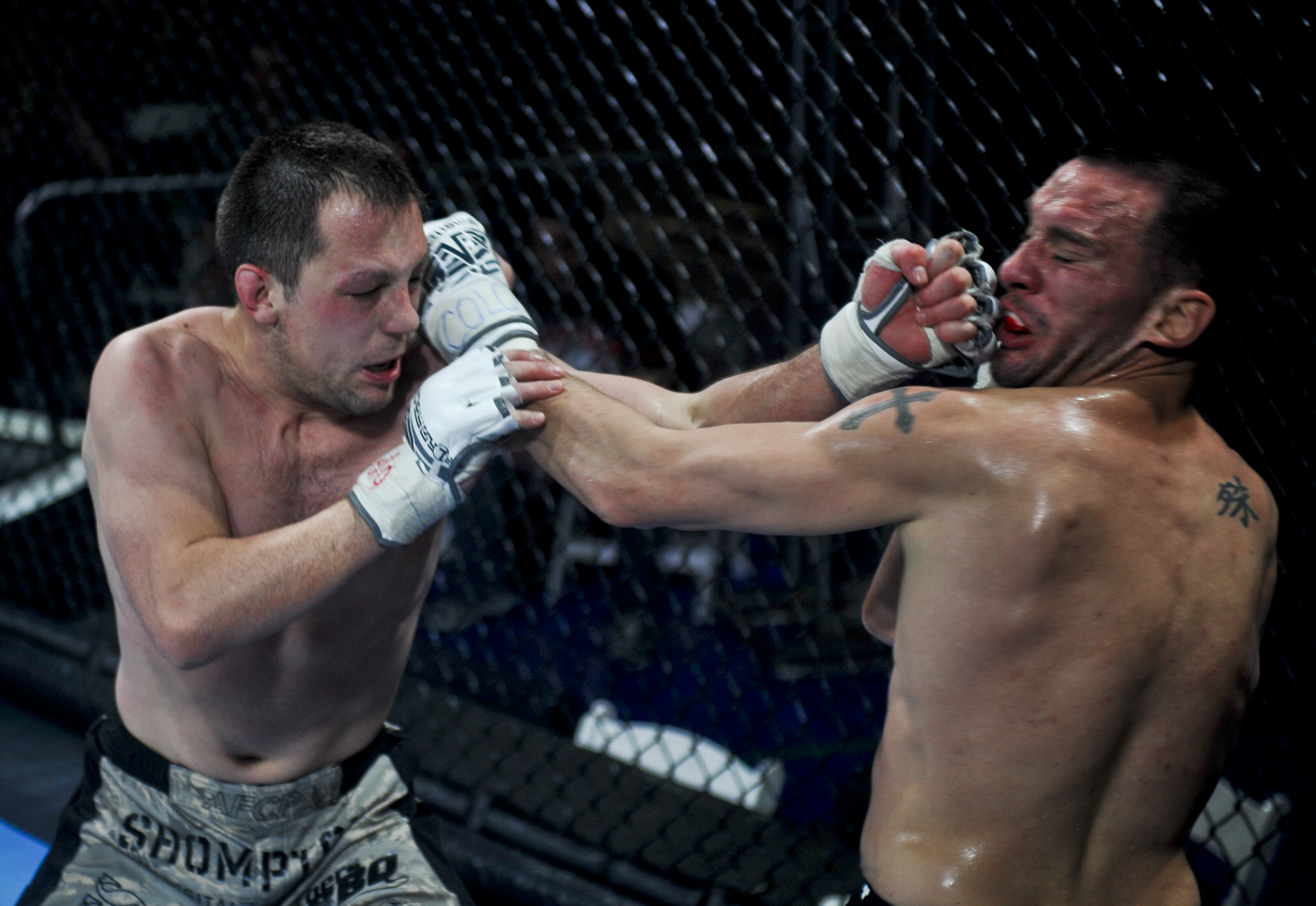
Punching distance: Fighters in punching distance

Punching distance: The punching distance is the zone where punches can be thrown, and this is the distance from the furthest jab to the closest hook, as long as no grappling is taking place. In addition to punches, this distance often also allows for elbows and knees, though using them requires closing in to the clinching distance. Boxing is a combat sport that concerns itself exclusively with the punching distance. However many martial arts, particularly those that employ extreme close range fighting (for example Wing Chun and Southern Praying Mantis) train ranges within punch range, but do not necessarily employ clinching techniques. This collection of ranges is often called the in-fighting range. In rules that allow both stand-up and ground-fighting, such as those of mixed martial arts, takedowns can also be launched from this distance. Going for a takedown from this distance is generally referred to as a shoot.

Clinching zone: The clinching or trapping zone refers to the same distance as the punching distance, except that one or both combatants grapple, and at the same time prevent the other from moving into a more distant contact zone or into the comfort zone by using a clinch hold. This zone involves a multitude of both striking and grappling techniques, and is discussed in its own article clinch fighting.
