= Loek Hollander =

Dutch martial artist (1938–2020)

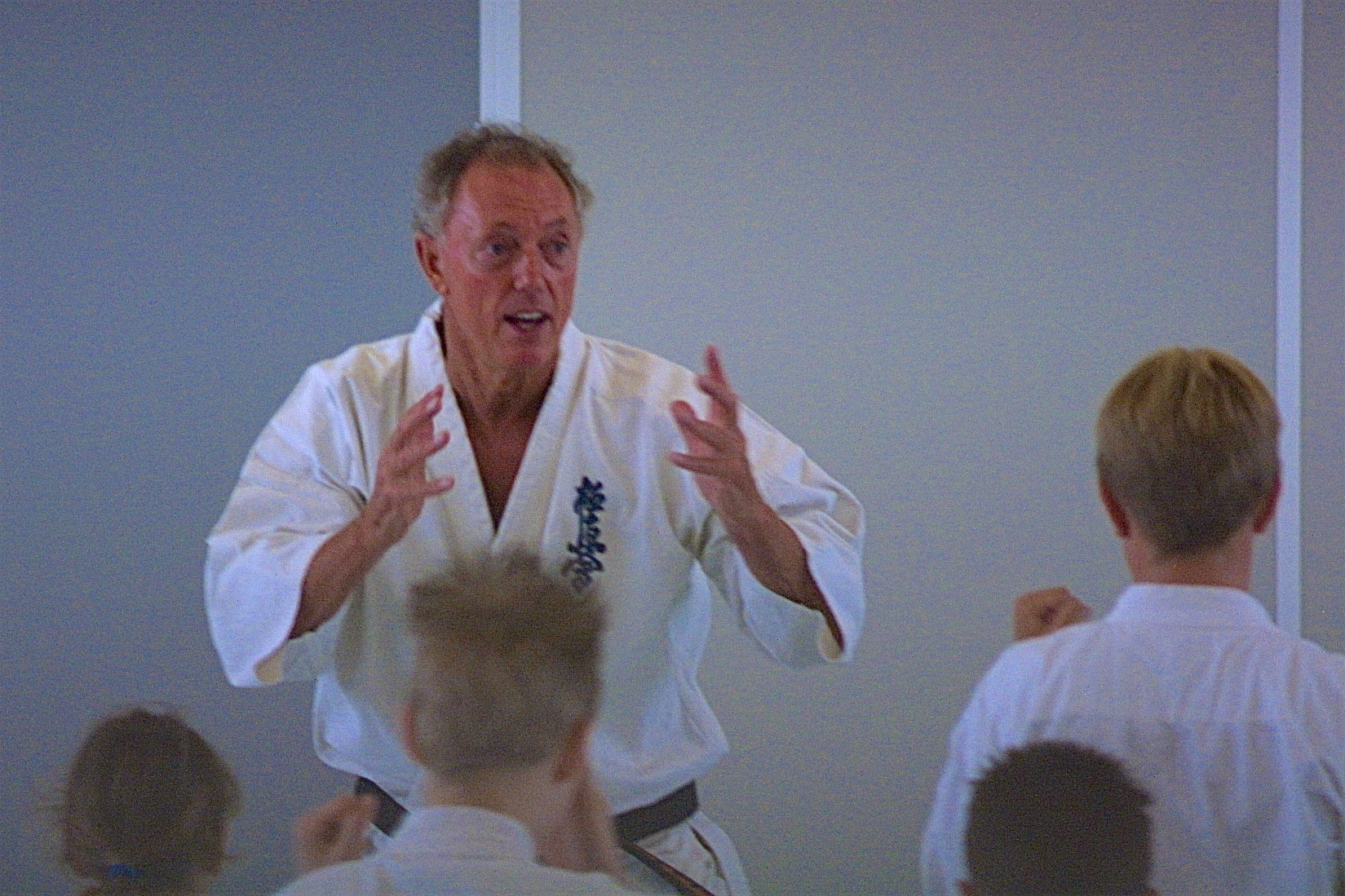
- Hollander in 2003
- Born: 20 May 1938; Rotterdam, Netherlands
- Died: 16 February 2020 (aged 81); Rotterdam, Netherlands
- Style: Kyokushin

Other information
- Notable students: John Reeberg

Loek Hollander (20 May 1938 – 16 February 2020) was a prominent Dutch karate practitioner.

== Biography ==
He began training Kyokushin Karate in 1962. Hollander earned his 1st dan ranking in 1965. Hollander was the fourth person ever to complete the 100-man kumite in 1967. Shihan Loek Hollander died on the morning of 16 February 2020.

After Sosai Masutatsu Oyama's death, new director Shokei Matsui appointed Hollander to be a regional representative for the European and African nations. In 1999, Matsui honored Hollander with the rank of 8th dan, making him one of the highest-ranking members of the IKO Kyokushinkaikan. Hollander was the International Committee Member for Europe and Africa within the IKO led by Shokei Matsui, until August 13, 2010, when he resigned from the organization in protest. In 2014 Loek Hollander was officially inducted into the CBME's National Hall of Fame for the Martial arts. He then headed the Kyokushin World Federation and was ranked 10 Dan.
