= Shokei Matsui =

Zainichi Korean MMA fighter (born 1963)

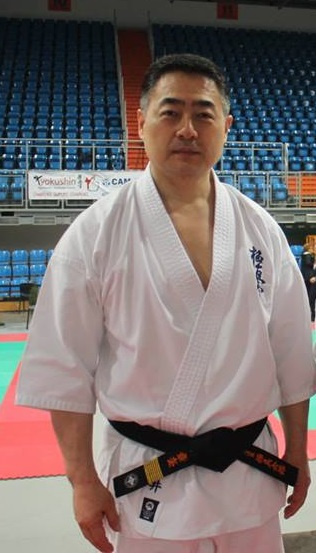
- Born: Moon Jang-gyu; January 15, 1963 (age 62); Bunkyō
- Native name: 文章圭
- Nationality: South Korean
- Style: Kyokushin Karate
- Teachers: Mas Oyama, Masatoshi Yamada
- Rank: 8th dan karate

Other information
- University: Chuo University

- Moon Jang-Gyu
- Hangul: 문장규
- Hanja: 文章圭
- RR: Mun Janggyu
- MR: Mun Changgyu

Shokei Matsui (松井 章奎, Matsui Shokei (Akiyoshi); born January 15, 1963), also known by his Korean name of Moon Jang-gyu (Korean: 문장규; Hanja: 文章圭), is a South Korean martial artist in Japan. He is the master of Kyokushin karate and current Kancho (Director) of the International Karate Organization Kyokushin-kaikan, faction of the International Karate Organization (IKO) founded by Mas Oyama (1923–1994).

== Early life ==
Matsui was born in 1963 and started training in Kyokushin karate at age 13. In 1976, he joined the Kita Nagare-Yama Dojo in Chiba Prefecture and attained the rank of 1st dan black belt in a little over one year.

== Later years ==
Matsui completed the 100-man kumite in 1987, when ranked 4th dan. In May 1992, Matsui opened his own dojo in Asakusa, Tokyo, and was later appointed as a Branch Chief by Oyama.

Near the end of his life, some say that Oyama named Matsui (then ranked 5th dan, and clearly junior in rank to several senior instructors) to succeed him in leading the IKO. However this has been disputed with his family and Matsui. Reportedly, a letter by senior Kyokushin instructor Peter Chong noted that Matsui was surprised to hear that he had been appointed to succeed Oyama, but also that Oyama had earlier named Matsui before several other people as the leading candidate to succeed him. Matsui then became Kancho (Director). Following a dispute over the veracity of Oyama's will, Kyokushin karate as an organization divided into three main groups, led by Matsui, Kenji Midori, and Yoshikazu Matsushima.

Matsui is currently ranked 8th dan, and leads one of the IKO groups, supported by Yuzo Goda, Bobby Lowe, Peter Chong, and Seiji Isobe. Loek Hollander had previously supported Matsui, but withdrew his support in August 2010. Subsequently, Peter Chong parted ways with Matsui in 2018 and formed his own organization.

== Tournament achievements ==
Matsui's tournament achievements include:

- 1980 — placed 4th in the 12th All Japan Open Karate Championships, when he was just 17
- 1981 — took 3rd place in the All Japan Open Karate Championships
- 1982 — took 3rd place in the same event
- 1983 — placed 8th place in the same event
- 1984 — placed 3rd in the 3rd World Open Karate Tournament
- 1985 — placed 1st in the same event
- 1986 — placed 1st in the same event and completed 100 man kumite
- 1987 — won the 4th World Open Karate Tournament, becoming the youngest champion ever
