= List of Kyokushin practitioners =

Notable Practitioner of Kyokushin Karate

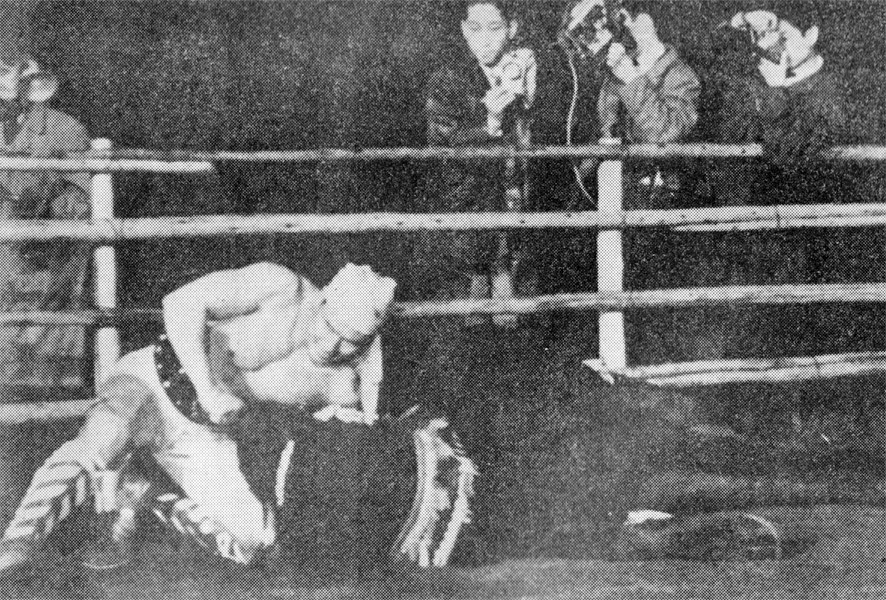
Kyokushinkaikan founder Masutatsu Oyama fighting a bull at the Denen Coliseum in 1956.

This is a list of highly notable practitioners of Kyokushin Karate.

== Founder ==
- Masutatsu Ōyama (大山 倍達, Ōyama Masutatsu; born Choi Yeong-eui (Hangul: 최영의 Hanja: 崔永宜)), more commonly known as Mas Oyama, was a karate master who founded Kyokushin Karate.

== Oyama's direct students ==
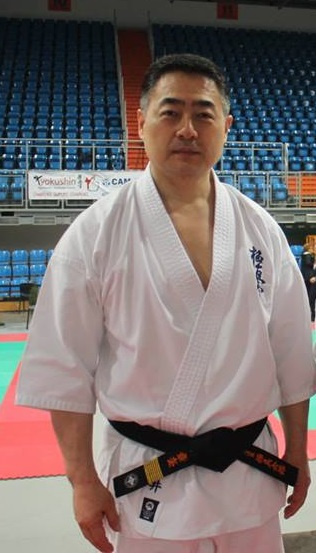
Shokei Matsui (head of IKO-1)

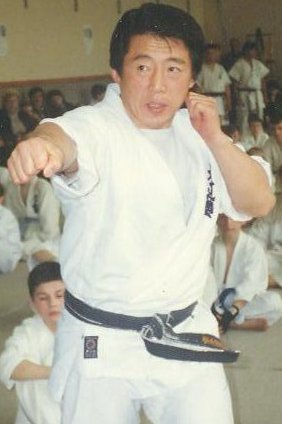
Takashi Azuma (Founder of Kudo Daidojuku)

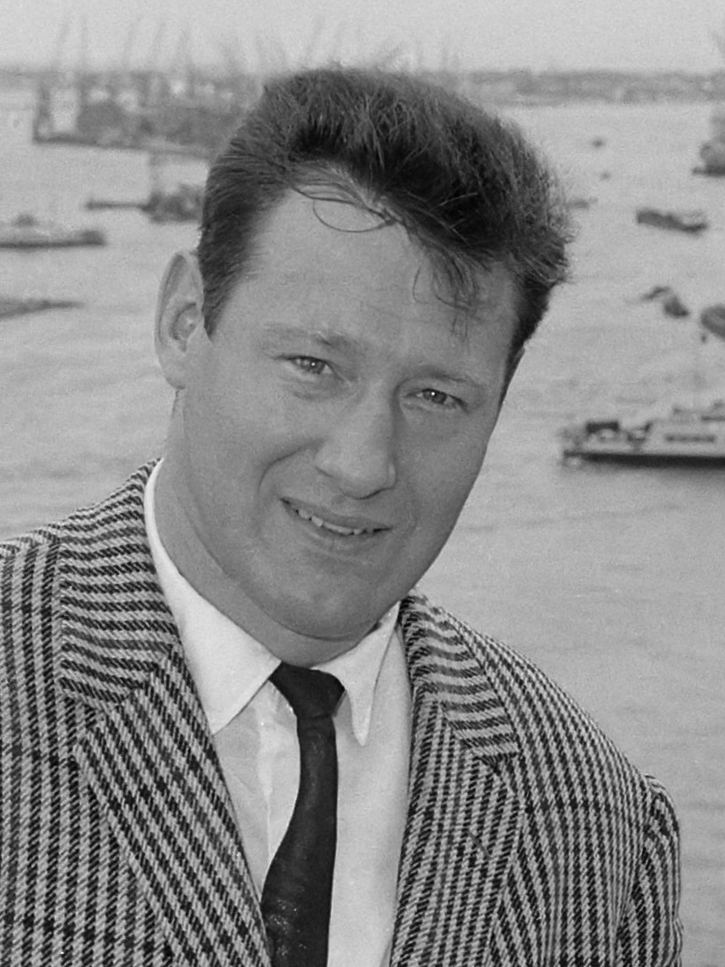
Jon Bluming (Founder of Kyokushin Budokai and IBK)

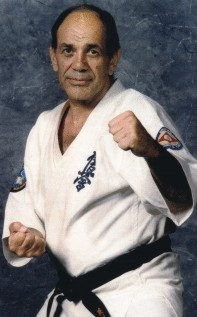
Steve Arneil (Founder of IFK)

=== Japanese nationals ===
- Terutomo Yamazaki – the first champion of the All-Japan Full Contact Karate Open Championships in 1969, and has promoted Kyokushin famous through his accomplishments. Because he fought and defeated Muay Thai boxers, he created a reputation for Kyokushin before the First All-Japan Open Full Contact Karate Championships was held. Yamazaki is highly skilled at and an authority on fighting and breaking. When he fought someone, it was usual that he knocked them out without receiving any injuries himself. He is nicknamed "The Genius Karate Fighter" or "The Dragon of Kyokushin", and when he was an active fighter, he was the most popular figure of the time. He has shown off his mixed karate and Muai Thai style of fighting at both full contact karate open championships and kickboxing, and has been noted internationally as a prominent fighter in karate's history, appearing in Black Belt Magazine in the United States.
- Yoshiji Soeno, founder of Shidōkan Karate.
- Hatsuo Royama – 9th dan, formerly Kancho (Director) and now Kaicho of the Kyokushin-kan International Honbu.
- Kenji Kurosaki – He is a 7th Dan Black Belt in Kyokushin Karate and operates various martial schools focusing in different arts. He is most well known as a pioneer of Full-Contact Karate and Kickboxing in both Japan and Netherlands.
- Hideyuki Ashihara – founder of Ashihara Karate
- Tsuyoshi Hiroshige – founder of Kyokushin Kenbukai
- Takashi Azuma – founder of the martial art Kūdō.
- Akira Masuda – 8th dan, Rijichō (chairman) of the International BudoMan Association (IBMA-KyokushinKai)
- Shokei Matsui (alias Matsui Akiyoshi, born Moon Jang-gyu) – 8th dan and current Kancho (Director) of the International Karate Organization Kyokushin-kaikan aka IKO-1.
- Katsuaki Satō – winner of the 1st World Full Contact Karate Open Championships and All-Japan Championships on two occasions
- Kenji Midori – winner of the 5th World Full Contact Karate Open Championships and current president of World Karate Organization (Shinkyokushinkai)
- Seiji Kanamura - 9th dan black belt, he began practicing Kyokushin Karate with Sosai Oyama in 1958. In 1971, he moved to the United States to teach Kyokushin Karate in the New York area. Prior to this, Shihan Kanamura was a special student (uchi-deshi) of Mas Oyama and served as Chief Instructor at the Hombu (the headquarters dojo) in Tokyo. He served as Head Instructor for the U.S. Kyokushin Karate team from 1975 to 1979 for the Tokyo Open Karate Tournaments. He is the founder of "All Japan Kyokushin Union".
- Tsutomu Wakiuchi - He is a 7th dan black belt (shihan), and he is director of the Italian Kyokushin Federation.

=== Japanese relocated overseas ===
- Shigeru Oyama – No relation to his teacher Mas Oyama, he was a karate practitioner and instructor who operated a dojo in New York and was head of the US Kyokushin organization for half a century. He taught Kyokushin karate for many years before forming his own organization World Oyama Karate in 1985.
- Jōkō Ninomiya – founder of Enshin Karate, he presides over the Enshin organization from the headquarters (honbu) in Denver, Colorado.
- Seiji Isobe – 8th dan, designated to Brazil, became Shihan after spread Kyokushin through South America, who taught and trained Francisco Filho, Glaube Feitosa and Everton Teixeira.
- Miyuki Miura – 8th dan, operates independently as Miura Dojo in Oak Park, Illinois, and works with other full contact dojo internationally through his Global Budo Karate Alliance.

=== Non-Japanese expatriates ===
- Daniel Bernhardt – Swiss actor and martial artist. A black belt in Taekwondo under Black Belt Hall of Fame member Hee-il Cho, he also studied Kyokushin karate under Mas Oyama.
- Jon Bluming – 10th dan and founder of the Kyokushin Budokai and IBK. In 1965, Bluming became the first non-Japanese in being awarded the 6º dan in karate from Masutatsu Oyama.
- Steve Arneil – 10th dan and founder of the International Federation of Karate (Kyokushin). He was the 1st person after Mas Oyama to successfully complete the 100-man Kumite.
- Howard Collins – in 1971 began training at the Kyokushin honbu dojo (headquarters training hall) under Oyama.
- Loek Hollander 10th dan.
- Bobby Lowe, 8th dan who served as branch chief of Hawaii for many years. He was the first uchi deshi (live-in student) of Masutatsu Oyama, and was also the first to establish a Kyokushin school outside Japan.
- Nicholas Pettas – Last Uchi Deshi.
- Peter Urban – Founder of USA Goju Karate; also a student of Gogen Yamaguchi.
- Peter Chong PBM (alias Peter Chong Seh Jam) – 9th dan and a former Assistant Superintendent of Police in Singapore. In 1965, Chong sailed to Japan to train in Kyokushin karate under Mas Oyama, without informing either his wife or his father of his intentions. He attained the 4th dan in 1972.
- Don Buck – American martial artist and early pioneer of Kyokushin in the United States. In 1957, he established one of the first Kyokushin dojos in the continental U.S. in San Francisco under Masutatsu Oyama. Promoted to 4th dan in 1960, he was later awarded 7th dan by Oyama and served as U.S. Branch Chief. In 1989, he was appointed Chairman for the United States, and in 1997 he founded the American Kyokushin Karate Organization (AKKO).

=== Celebrity ===
- Sir Sean Connery – was awarded an honorary Shodan in Kyokushinkai by Sosai Mas Oyama.
- Masashi "Milton" Ishibashi – worked as a Karate instructor at the Oyama Dojo and Kyokushin Kaikan during his early days as an actor. He was also instructor for Sonny Chiba and Terutomo Yamazaki.
- Sonny Chiba – popular Japanese actor and martial artist. While he was a university student, he began studying martial arts with Sosei Oyama (whom he later portrayed in a trilogy of films), which led to a first-degree black belt on 15 October 1965, later receiving a fourth-degree on 20 January 1984. Although supervised by Oyama, Chiba was mainly trained by Masashi Ishibashi.
- Etsuko Shihomi – actress who specialized in action films
- Kyosuke Machida – Japanese actor. When he was a child, he became Mas Oyama's pupil. He now serves as an advisor for the International Karate Organization Kyokushin-kaikan.

== Knockdown Karate ==
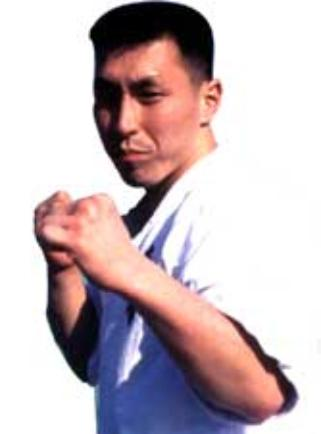
Hajime Kazumi

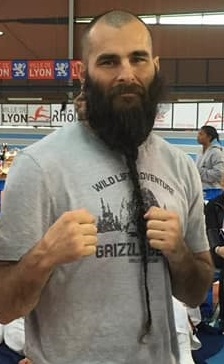
Alejandro Navarro

- Kazuyoshi Ishii – founder of Seidokaikan karate, as well as the K-1 fighting circuit. Began training in Kyokushin karate under Hideyuki Ashihara.
- Hajime Kazumi – a karate fighter who played an active part in the full-contact karate tournaments hosted by Kyokushinkaikan from the early 1990s to the early 2000s. Is recognized as one of Kyokushin Karate's most successful full-contact fighters.
- Lechi Kurbanov – is a Chechnyan-Russian karateka. He is a multiple Kyokushin European Champion and Japanese Champion.
- Willie Williams – Nicknamed the "Bear Killer", Williams is an American karateka, mixed martial artist and professional wrestler.
- Garry O'Neill – Australian karateka and kickboxer, O'Neill is one of the most prolific Kyokushin contestants of his country.
- Tomasz Kucharzewski
- Alejandro Navarro - Spanish Full-contact Karateka. He is a 14-time Kyokushin European Champion, of which Navarro has won the Open Championship eight times.
- Arthur Hovhannisyan
- Samson Muripo
- Jan Kallenbach – was a Dutch martial artist. He was a 7th Dan teacher of Taikiken, a Japanese off-shoot of Yiquan and had a significant history in Full contact Karate (Kyokushin-Kaikan). Veteran Kyokushin practitioners from Japan considered Kallenbach as one of the most dominant foreign fighters during the style's early stages in the 1960s and 1970s.
- Daniel "Tiger" Schulmann – American Kyokushin karateka and mixed martial arts trainer. Schulmann was the North American Mas Oyama Full-Contact Karate Champion for six consecutive years (1979–1984)

== Kickboxing ==
- Andy Hug – regarded as one of the best Kyokushin fighters of all time. He began practising Kyokushinkai karate from age 10 under Werner Schenker. At age 15, he won the 1979 Swiss Oyama Cup, a national Kyokushin competition. Competed in Kyokushin under Knockdown rules from 1977 to 1991. In 1992, he began pursuing Kickboxing, starting from Seidokaikan and later transitioned to fighting under K-1 Rules.
- Jérôme Le Banner
- Mark Reeder - 6th dan black belt in Kyokushin Karate. Known as one of the preeminent practitioners in the Boston metro area. Currently a Professor of Mathematics at Boston College.
- Francisco Filho – 7th dan black belt in Kyokushin Karate. Started Kyokushin kaikan around age of 10 and received black belt six and half years later. In 1995 Fancisco Filho completed 100-man kumite in Brazil and in Japan.
- Glaube Feitosa - Brazilian former kickboxer and a kyokushin full contact karate practitioner who was competing in K-1.
- Ewerton Teixeira – Brazilian professional kickboxer, mixed martial artist, and Kyokushin Kaikan karateka.
- Jan Plas – was a Dutch professional kickboxer, trainer and founder of the Mejiro Gym in Amsterdam. Started learning Kyokushin from Jon Bluming. He founded the Mejiro Gym in 1978 after learning kickboxing from Kenji Kurosaki.
- Thom Harinck – Dutch kickboxing trainer and founder of the Chakuriki Gym in Amsterdam. At the age of seventeen he worked as a bouncer at a local Club and began a partnership with Jan Stapper, a Kyokushin instructor.
- Lucien Carbin – Surinamese-Dutch former kickboxer, karateka and trainer. He was the first European Kyokushin karate champion, a world kickboxing champion and a European Savate and Muay Thai champion. Studied Kyokushin under Jon Bluming.
- Sam Greco – Australian retired full contact karateka, heavyweight K-1 kickboxer, mixed martial artist. Greco started training in Kyokushin karate at the age of 11 and commenced tournament fighting at the age of 18 establishing himself as one of Australia's best Kyokushin fighters in the late 1980s and early 1990s.
- Tenshin Nasukawa - Nasukawa was regarded as a pound for pound talent throughout most of his career as a professional kickboxer and is regarded as one of the greatest kickboxers in the modern history of the sport. He initially started learning Kyokushin Karate at age 5. He frequently utilizes the Do Mawashi Kaiten Geri (Rolling Thunder kick) from Kyokushin.
- Semmy Schilt
- Peter Smit
- Michael Thompson (karateka)
- Jan Soukup
- Nicholas Pettas
- Marek Piotrowski
- Peter Graham
- Masahiro Yamamoto
- Takayuki Kohiruimaki
- Tsogto Amara
- Leona Pettas
- Baboo Da Silva
- Hiroki Akimoto
- Mike Bernardo
- Aleksandr Pitchkounov
- Yūji Nashiro
- Kengo Shimizu
- Shota Takiya
- Yuki Yoza

== Mixed Martial Arts ==
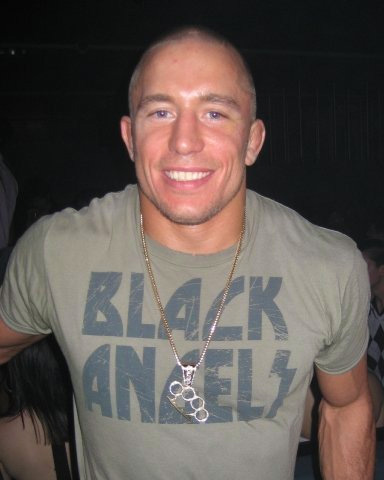
Georges St-Pierre

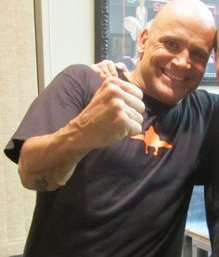
Bas Rutten

- Jiří Procházka — Czech professional mixed martial artist who competes in the Light Heavyweight division of the Ultimate Fighting Championship (UFC) where he is a former UFC Light Heavyweight Champion.
- Georges St-Pierre – UFC Hall of Famer (Modern-Era Wing, Class of 2020). He began learning Kyokushin Karate at age seven to defend himself against a school bully.
- Bas Rutten – UFC Hall of Famer (Pioneer wing, 2015 inductee) and three-time King of Pancrase Openweight Champion. After earning a 2nd Dan Black in Taekwondo, Rutten began learning Kyokushin karate and earned a 2nd-degree black belt.
- Ryo Chonan
- Nikita Krylov - Ukrainian mixed martial artist who competes in the light heavyweight division of the Ultimate Fighting Championship. He has Master of Sports in Kyokushin.
- Mariusz Pudzianowski – Held a fourth kyu green belt in Kyokushin in 2009.
- Gerard Gordeau – 9th Dan, currently the head of "Internationale Budo Kai" martial arts organization. Most well-known for his fight against Teila Tuli in the first televised Ultimate Fighting Championship bout on 12 November 1993.
- Manny Gamburyan – Armenian mixed martial artist who has competed in the UFC's lightweight, featherweight, and bantamweight divisions. He began training in Kyokushin Karate aged 15.
- Uriah Hall
- Mamed Khalidov
- Jan Soukup
- Katsunori Kikuno
- Marius Zaromskis

== Celebrity ==
This lists celebrities, who were not directly trained by Mas Oyama:

- Dolph Lundgren – He took up Kyokushin karate at the age of 10. He captained the Swedish Kyokushin karate team, and was a formidable challenger at the 1979 World Open Tournament (arranged by the Kyokushin Karate Organization) when he was only a green belt. He was the Swedish champion in Kyokushin in 1979, 1980 and 1981. He won the European championships in 1980 and 1981, and a heavyweight tournament in Australia in 1982.
- Batu Khasikov
- Michael Rooker
- Michael Jai White
- Seth Rogen
- Glen Murphy
- Hiroyuki Sanada
- Francesco Bellissimo
- Isaac Florentine
- Maryse Mizanin (née Ouellet) - holds a black belt in Kyokushin Karate.
- Jason Statham
- Minoru Fujita
- Mackenyu Arata
- Gordon Maeda
- Hennie Bosman
- William Vanderpuye – British actor, broadcaster, writer, voice-over artist and producer. Currently holds a 3rd Dan black belt in Kyokushin Karate.
- Zulkifli Hasan – an Indonesian politician and businessman. He served as chairman of the Board of Supervisors of Kyokushinkan International Indonesia. In June 2010, he received an honorary black belt from the supreme leader of Kyokushin International.
- Stephen Lang

== See also ==
- List of Karateka
