= Samson Muripo =

Zimbabwean karateka

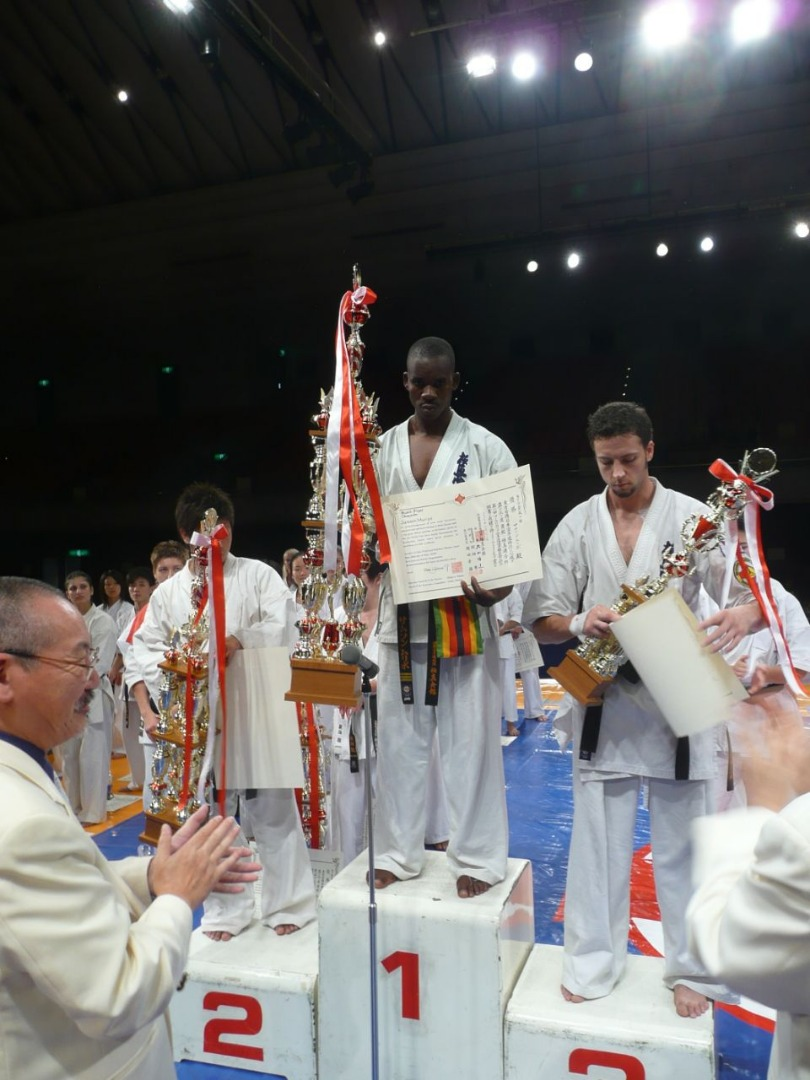
- Samson Muripo at the 1st World Cup Open Karate Tournament in Osaka, Japan in 2009
- Born: 5 May 1978 (age 48); Chimanimani, Zimbabwe
- Other names: Shihan Muripo
- Style: Kyokushin Karate
- Rank: 6th Dan Shihan

Other information
- Website: www.sokyokushin.org.zw

Shihan Samson Muripo - 6th Dan (born 5 May 1978) is a Zimbabwean two-time World Kyokushin Karate Champion. Samson Muripo became the first black African Kyokushin World Champion in Osaka, Japan 2009.

== Background ==
Samson Muripo was born in Chishiri Village in Chimanimani. He started training Karate in 1993 at Ndima Government High School.

In Japan 2009, Muripo won gold at the 1st World Cup Open Karate Tournament in Osaka, after defeating Japanese champion Kikuyama Yasumichi in the final match • Zimbabwe's ANSA 2009 and 2017 Sportsperson, Sportsman of the year 2009, 2013 and 2017 • Experienced trainer in mental and physical coordination • Skilled team and individual motivator • Team player • Dedicated to grassroots and international karate development • High regard for professionalism • Successful Trainer of Trainers • Successful local and regional karate event organizer • Sport Ethics – Zimbabwe Olympic Committee Coaching Certificate – 2019. • Train the Trainers - Zimbabwe Olympic Committee Coaching Certificate – 2015. .

In 2021 a documentary series about his karate career was announced, it was produced by Yakontent. According to the Zimbabwe Sports and Recreation Commission he is a 6th Dan Black Belt (ROKUDAN) in Kyokushin.

=== Sports administration ===
Muripo is the Branch Chief for the Zimbabwe So-Kyokushin Karate - Do Organization https://www.sokyokushin.net/wp/wp-content/themes/sokyokushin/world_samson.html, Africa Development Officer for the International Karate Organization Kyokushinkaikan: World So-Kyokushin, council member in the International Karate Organization Kyokushinkaikan: World So-Kyokushin, council member in the Zimbabwe Karate Union (Style representative), council member in the Harare Metropolitan Province Karate Association (style representative) and he is also a qualified technical Dan examiner.

He has organized local Kyokushin Karate tournaments and seminars. He organized the first International So-Kyokushin Karate Championship on July the 22nd of 2017 at The Aquatic Complex in Chitungwiza. He also organized the continental championships in 2015 and 2016. Shihan Muripo has also been active in attaining sponsorships for Zimbabwe from Arosume Property Development and Dr. Mnaba.

== Achievements ==
=== Regional and local achievements ===
Shihan Muripo has medals in competitions he participated in. He was also named Zimbabwe's Annual National Sports Awards (ANSA) Sportsperson of the years 2009 and 2017, and Sportsman of the year 2009; 2013 and 2017. In 2018, he came second at the Zimbabwe Annual National Sports Awards.

=== International achievements ===
- Gold Medallist in the All Africa Kyokushin Karate Championships in the senior men under 80 kg, Cape Town, Republic of South Africa, October 2006.
- Gold Medallist in the Last Man Standing, Knock out Karate Tournament in the Open Weight Category Cape Town, April 2008.
- Gold Medallist in the Ashihara International Full Contact Karate Open Championships in Cape Town, August, 2008.
- Gold Medallist in the Karate South Africa All Style Full Contact Championships in the Middleweight- men's category, September 2008.
- First African World Karate Champion at the 1st World Cup Open Karate Tournament in Osaka, Japan, June 2009.
- Best Technical Prize of the 1st World Cup Open Karate Tournament, Osaka, Japan, June 2009.
- Silver Medalist at the Higashi Nippon International Kyokushin Karate-do Senshukentaikai Open Weight Tournament in Shizuoka Prefecture, Japan, April 2010.
- Fighting Spirit Award of the 2nd World Cup Open Kyokushinkai Karate Tournament in Astana, Kazakhstan, July 2011.
- Silver Medalist in the Middleweight category of the 2nd World Cup Open Kyokushinkai Karate Tournament, Astana, Kazakhstan, July 2011.
- Gold Medalist in the Men's Open Weight Category of the Southern Africa Kyokushin Union Karate Championships, Thokoza, Johannesburg, Republic of South Africa, May 2012.
- Silver Medalist in the Men's Open of the 5th Len Barnes Memorial International Karate Tournament, June 2013 in Cape Town, South Africa.
- Bronze Medalist, Middleweight category of the World Kyokushin Union Karate Championships in Bulgaria 5–6 October 2013.
- Champion in the Heavyweight Category of the 2013 So-Kyokushin Cup Karate International Tournament in Shanghai, China.
- Silver Medalist in the Superheavyweight Category of the 2013 So-Kyokushin Cup International Karate Tournament in Shanghai, China.
- Silver Medalist in the Middle Weight of the 4th IKO Matsushima Group World Karate Tournament in Durban, RSA on the 6th and 7 September 2014.
- Bronze Medalist at the 46th All Japan International Karate Tournament in Shizuoka Prefecture, Japan, April 2015.
- Gold Medalist of the Men 35 years plus Open Weight in the 3rd So-Kyokushin International Karate Tournament in Ahvaz, Iran, February 2017.
- Silver Medalist of the Men 23 years plus Open Weight in the 3rd So-Kyokushin International Karate Tournament in Ahvaz, Iran, February 2017.
- Gold Medalist of the Men 35–40 years Over 75kilograms (Open Weight) in the 4th Ohishi Cup So-Kyokushin International Karate Championships in Ahvaz, Iran, February 28 – the 2nd of March 2018.
- Silver Medalist of the Men +18years Kata Competition (Open Weight Division), in the 4th Ohishi Cup So-Kyokushin International Karate Championships in Ahvaz, Iran, February 28 – the 2nd of March 2018.
- Gold Medalist in the Young Master Kumite Category (36-46years) Men Open of the 49th All Japan Karate Tournament in Shizuoka City, Japan, 14th and 15 April 2018
- Gold Medalist in the Open Weight Division of the IKOKU International Full Contact Karate Tournament in Cape Town, Republic of South Africa on the 25th of August 2018
- Gold Medal in the Men Over 80 kg Veterans Category (41–45 years) at the 6th Kyokushin Karate World Cup, Moscow, Russia on October 6 of 2019.

• He graded to 6th Dan on the 27th of November, 2023 together with Shihan George Mutambu - 5th Dan and Shihan Likhwa Khumalo - 5th Dan in Shizuoka City, Japan by Hanshi DAIGO Oishi - 9th Dan.
