= Sayokan =

Turkish martial art

- Focus: Hybrid, Striking
- Hardness: Full Contact
- Country of origin: Turkey
- Creator: Nihat Yiğit
- Parenthood: Ashihara Karate, Kurash
- Olympic sport: No

Sayokan is a contemporary Turkish martial art created by Nihat Yiğit in 1999. Sayokan has steered away from the memorization and rigidity of some traditional martial arts in favor of learning by concept. Their idea is not to count on a series of memorized moves because the odds are high that something will go wrong. Sayokan is a self-defense system developed from Central Asian principals in combination with Ottoman style strikes and grappling moves. Instead of memorizing many specific techniques, the Sayokan practitioner learns by strategy.

Some of the core concepts of Sayokan are twisting your core, knowing the angles of attack, being keenly aware of distance, and knowing when your opponent over-extends so you can use that to your advantage, to name a few.

Many martial artists begin their training in a traditional style, then move onto Sayokan to enhance their training. Practitioners of other martial arts can train alongside in Sayokan.

The word Sayokan stands for "Savaşçının Yolu ve Kanı" (English: the Warrior's Path and Blood). Sayokan focuses more on strategy rather than a singularized strict fighting technique. Behind this ideology, a practitioner would have an adaptive technique allowing for flexibility while pacifying opponents rather than a technique restricted to the realm of a particular style or rule.
