= Katsuaki Satō =

Martial artist

- Born: April 4, 1946 (age 80); Sakhalin, Japan
- Style: Kyokushin Karate, Judo, Satojuku Karate
- Teachers: Masutatsu Oyama, Terutomo Yamazaki
- Rank: 4th dan karate, 3rd dan judo

Other information
- Website: http://www.satojuku.com/

Katsuaki Satō (佐藤 勝昭, Satō Katsuaki; born April 4, 1946) is the founder and director of Satojuku Karate, also known as Odo (The Champion's Way) karate. The Satojuku honbu (headquarters) is located in Tachikawa, Japan.

Satō was born on April 4, 1946, on Sakhalin Island, then part of occupied Japan following the end of World War II. The Soviet Union had invaded the island during the closing stages of the war, but around 300,000 Japanese remained on the island, including Satō's family. In 1947, his family moved to Nakoso, in Fukushima Prefecture.

In high school Satō trained-in judo; after graduation, he continued to study it while working full-time as a journalist and studying part-time at Chuo University. However, at the age of 20, he injured his knee and shoulder and had to give up judo. Instead, he began training in Kyokushin karate in 1969. Satō studied karate from Terutomo Yamazaki for whom Satō has expressed much respect. Satō reached the rank of shodan (1st degree black belt) on October 1, 1971. He reached the rank of 3rd dan in karate on March 18, 1973 and he had also attained 3rd dan ranking in judo. He reached the rank of 4th dan in karate on May 1, 1974.

Satō excelled in tournament competition. He won the 1971 (Third) and 1974 (Sixth) All-Japan Full Contact Karate Championships (AJFCKC), as well as the 1975 First All-World Full Contact Karate Championships (AWFCKC). He was part of a Kyokushin training group nicknamed "The Seven Samurai," which included Jōkō Ninomiya. Satō defeated Ninomiya on his way to taking the 1975 Kyokushin title. In 1976, he was listed at 5 ft 10 1/2 in (179.1 cm) in height and 183 pounds (83 kg) in weight. A later source specifies 1.80 m (5 ft 11 in) and 90 kg (200 lb; 14 st). He then retired from full-time karate training and competition and devoted himself to assisting his family's business.

In 1977, Satō started his own karate style, Satojuku, in Mitaka, Tokyo, as a single dojo (training hall). Satojuku has now grown to include dojo in many locations in Japan. Satojuku is known as a similar style to Kyokushin, but emphasizes precise knockdown techniques over techniques designed to injure or "knock-out" one's opponent. The organization sponsors an annual tournament, the All-Japan Point & K.O. Tournament, held at Yoyogi National Gymnasium in Tokyo, Japan, with full-contact, knockdown rules of competition.

Describing his art in 1987, Satō wrote, "Odo means the way champions must behave. It is based on humane feelings and courtesy, on being honorable, on being devoid of selfishness or bias. It is the antithesis of any martial art that relies only on force to conquer an opponent."
