= Go Yokoyama =

Japanese kickboxer

- Born: Tsuyoshi Yokoyama; June 29, 1983 (age 43); Hyōgo, Japan
- Other names: Karate Prodigy
- Nationality: (Japan) Japanese
- Height: 5 ft 10 in (1.78 m)
- Weight: 154 lb (70 kg; 11.0 st)
- Division: Welterweight
- Style: Seidokaikan Karate, Shidokan Karate
- Team: Crazy Wolf
- Years active: 2008-present

Kickboxing record
- Total: 11
- Wins: 9
- By knockout: 4
- Losses: 1
- By knockout: 1
- Draws: 1

Tsuyoshi Yokoyama (born June 29, 1983), better known as Go Yokoyama (横山 剛, Yokoyama Gō) is a Japanese kickboxer who competes in the welterweight division. He comes from a Seidokaikan karate background and is known for his unorthodox kicks.

== Biography and career ==
Yamamoto began practicing karate at the age of 13. His brother Shingo Yokoyama is also a kickboxer. In 2003 he became the 5th All Japan Seidokaikan Lightweight Champion.

He made his professional kickboxing debut on August 16, 2008, when he defeated Marcelo Nascimento by a unanimous decision. In his following fight he made his debut in the K-1 promotion at 'the K-1 World MAX 2009 World Championship Tournament Final 8 and was knocked out by Jae Gil Noh. Following this he went on an eight fight unbeaten run consisting of seven wins and one draw. He returned to K-1 in a tournament reserve match at K-1 World MAX 2011 -70kg Japan Tournament Final on September 25, 2011. He defeated Yoshi via a unanimous decision.

== Titles ==
- 5th Seido Kaikan All Japan Lightweight Champion (2003)

== Kickboxing record ==
Kickboxing record
9 wins (4 KOs), 1 loss, 1 draw
Date	Result	Opponent	Event	Location	Method	Round	Time	Record	Notes
September 25, 2011	Win	(Japan) Yoshi	K-1 World MAX 2011 -70kg Japan Tournament Final	Osaka, Japan	Decision (unanimous)	3	3:00	9-1-1	
August 6, 2011	Win	(Japan) Kimuisaku	Gladiator 21	Japan	KO (left hook to the body)	1	2:27	8-1-1	
June 5, 2011	Win	(Japan) Yusuke Fukuda	HEAT 18	Osaka, Japan	Decision (Unanimous)	3	3:00	7-1-1	
May 2, 2011	Win	(Japan) Takeshi Yoshitsugu	ACCEL: Heavyweight Tournament Opening Round	Japan	KO (right hook)	2	-	6-1-1	
December 30, 2010	Draw	(Japan) Kosuke Yamauchi	Sengoku: Soul of Fight	Tokyo, Japan	Decision draw	3	3:00	5-1-1	
December 2010	Win	(Japan) Courage	Legend 1: Land of Fire	Japan	TKO	3	0:29	5-1	
October 9, 2010	Win	(Japan) Shingo Takayama	Gladiator 11	Japan	Decision (split)	3	3:00	4-1	
April 25, 2010	Win		Gladiator 6	Japan	TKO (corner stoppage)	2	2:29	3-1	
November 3, 2009	Win	(Japan) Munjefun	Gladiator Okayama: Japan-Korea Friendship	Okayama, Japan	Decision (unanimous)	3	3:00	2-1	
July 13, 2009	Loss	(South Korea) Jae Gil Noh	K-1 World MAX 2009 World Championship Tournament Final 8	Tokyo, Japan	KO (straight right)	3	2:01	1-1	
August 16, 2008	Win	(Brazil) Marcelo Nascimento	Gladiator: Korea Friendship International Martial Arts Tournament	Japan	Decision (unanimous)	3	3:00	1-0	
Legend: Win Loss Draw/No contest
