= Jōkō Ninomiya =

Japanese karateka

- Born: January 27, 1954 (age 72); Yawatahama, Shikoku, Japan
- Other names: Kancho
- Style: Enshin Karate
- Teacher: Hideyuki Ashihara

Other information
- Notable students: 10,000
- Website: www.enshin.com
- Koichi Ninomiya Jota Ninomiya

Jōkō Ninomiya (二宮 城光, Ninomiya Jōkō; born January 27, 1954) is the founder and director of Enshin Karate. He presides over the Enshin organization from the headquarters (honbu) in Denver, Colorado. His title as head of the Enshin organization is "Kanchō" (Grandmaster).

== Early history ==
Joko Ninomiya was born on January 27, 1954, in (Former Hizuchi village, Nishiuwa district) Yawatahama, Shikoku, Japan. Ninomiya was the youngest of 10 brothers and sisters. His family owned and tended to several fruit orchards. To augment the family's income, his father also worked as a carpenter.

In seventh grade, at age 12, Ninomiya began training in a Judo class taught by a teacher at his junior high school. He earned his first degree black belt by the end of eighth grade. After turning 14, Ninomiya did extra Judo training at the local police station gym on weekends and holidays. It was there that he met the man who would become his teacher and mentor in karate- Hideyuki Ashihara. One year later, in 1969, Ninomiya began training in Ashihara's Kyokushin dojo.

Hideyuki Ashihara began training in Kyokushin karate at the honbu dojo in 1971 when he was 16 years old. Kyokushin(kai) is a full contact, knockdown style of karate founded by Mas Oyama. Ashihara attained first degree black belt in Kyokushin in 1974. Two years after that he became an instructor, and two years after that he was allowed to open his own dojo in Ninomiya's home town of Yawatahama.

During this time, Ashihara was developing his own approach to the Kyokushin curriculum he was teaching his students as well as adding additional movements and techniques that he had devised. His techniques involved using circular patterns to move outside of an opponent's attack and then to counterattack from a position of advantage. These techniques also involved parries and sweeps intended to use the opponent's momentum against him. He always stressed getting the maximum impact from a minimum amount of force. Ashihara called these techniques, "Sabaki." Although many of these techniques were prohibited in Kyokushin Knockdown karate tournament rules, he taught them to his students, including Ninomiya, so that they would be more effective, all-around karate fighters. Many renowned karate students came to train at Ashihara's dojo because of his reputation as an extremely effective instructor.

When Ninomiya was 17, he received his brown belt in Kyokushin from Ashihara and was chosen to compete in the All-Japan Tournament as the youngest competitor. He lost in the second round to eventual tournament champion Katsuaki Satō.

Ninomiya trained hard for the next year's tournament, including spending three weeks living and training alone at a beach some distance from his home town. At his second All-Japan tournament in 1972 he lost in the third round to eventual tournament champion Miyuki Miura.

During this time, Ninomiya had continued to train and compete in judo, as well as in karate. However, with graduation from high school, he stopped training in judo and trained full-time in karate, when not working in various jobs, including as a nightclub security guard. Ninomiya was now a 1st degree black belt in Kyokushin. At the 1973 All-Japan tournament, he lost again in the third round, this time to eventual tournament champion Hatsuo Royama.

== Move to America ==
One month after the 1973 tournament, Ninomiya was chosen, along with five others, to go to live and train at the three Kyokushin dojo in New York City. Two of the American fighters that trained with them there were William Oliver and Willie Williams. The other five members of the group returned to Japan after two months, but Ninomiya stayed in New York to teach and train. Because of visa problems, he was unable to compete in the 1974 All-Japan tournament.

In October, 1975, 21-year-old Joko Ninomiya returned to Japan to compete in the first All-World Tournament. In the semi-finals, he once again faced Katsuaki Satō. After a three-overtime match, Satō won the match by judge's decision. Satō then won the subsequent title match against Hatsuo Royama. Ninomiya finished in third place. The tournament was filmed for a documentary, called Fighting Black Kings that also profiled several of the competitors, including William Oliver and Willie Williams.

Ninomiya returned to New York and prepared for the next year's All-Japan tournament. At the tournament, his quarter-final match went to three overtimes before he was awarded the decision. His semi-final match went two overtimes before he was again awarded the decision. Extremely fatigued, Ninomiya had only 10-minutes to rest and prepare for the final match against Toshikazu Satō which Satō won. Ninomiya returned to New York to resume teaching and training.

Ninomiya was unable to compete in the 1977 All-Japan due to a training accident involving a sword that almost severed his left thumb. Instead, he decided to move to Denver to open his own Kyokushin dojo. His first classes were held in a neighborhood health club. However, he was subsequently able to rent a vacant store to use as a training dojo. He soon had a dedicated core of students.

The next year, Ninomiya returned to Japan briefly for his father's funeral. Seven months later, he returned again for the 1978 All-Japan Tournament. In the final match, Ninomiya defeated Keiji Sanpei to win the All-Japan championship. He then retired from tournament competition to concentrate full-time on teaching karate.

== Ashihara and Enshin karate ==
In 1980 Hideyuki Ashihara left the Kyokushin organization and started his own style- Ashihara Karate. Ninomiya directed the US region of Ashihara Karate from Denver. Over the next eight years, Ashihara Karate slowly increased in size in the US and around the world.

During this time, Ninomiya states that he had developed strategies and ideas of his own that he was eager to implement in his training curriculum. He also wanted to develop his own tournament format that would provide what he felt to be a "true" test of karate skills. Therefore, in May, 1988, Ninomiya decided to leave Ashihara Karate and start his own style. Most of the instructors and students of Ashihara in the US decided to follow Ninomiya into his new organization Enshin kaikan, providing a strong base for the new style- Enshin Karate.

Since 1988, Enshin Karate has continued to be headquartered at Ninomiya's honbu in Denver. The organization has grown and now includes schools in Asia, South America, Europe, Africa, Australia, and the Middle East, as well as in the US. Ninomiya's idea for an open, knockdown-rules tournament that promotes the Sabaki method became the Sabaki Challenge which has been held annually in Denver since 1989.

Ninomiya travels extensively in his position as director of the Enshin organization. He attends the openings of new dojo, presides over Enshin sabaki tournaments, and conducts seminars on the sabaki method. When not traveling he trains and instructs at the honbu in Denver.
