= Yoshiji Soeno =

Japanese karateka (born 1947)

Yoshiji Soeno 添野 義二
- Born: September 29, 1947 (age 79); Tokorozawa, Japan
- Other names: The Tiger of Josai
- Nationality: (Japan) Japanese
- Height: 1.74 m (5 ft 8 1/2 in)
- Weight: 70 kg (150 lb; 11 st)
- Division: Welterweight
- Style: Shidōkan Karate (founder); Kyokushin, Judo, Wado-Ryu, Goju-Ryu, Shotokan, Kickboxing, Muay Thai
- Stance: Orthodox
- Fighting out of: Ikebukuro, Tokyo, Japan
- Team: Kyokushin Gym
- Rank: 9th dan black belt in Shidōkan Karate
- Years active: 1969 – 1970

Kickboxing record
- Total: 9
- Wins: 6
- Losses: 3
- By knockout: 0
- Draws: 0
- No contests: 0

Other information
- Occupation: Grandmaster
- University: Josai University
- Notable students: Miyuki Miura, Yasunori Matsumoto, Makoto Uehara
- Website: http://www.shidokan-hombu.com/
- Last updated on: March 20, 2010

Yoshiji Soeno (添野 義二, Soeno Yoshiji; born September 29, 1947) is a Japanese karateka and a retired professional welterweight kickboxer.

Soeno was a renowned practitioner of Kyokushin-kaikan style of karate, before branching out and founding his own style of Shidōkan Karate. Soeno is currently the director of The World Karate Association Shidokan, headquartered at Shizuoka-ken, Japan.

== Background ==
Yoshiji Soeno was born in Tokorozawa, Saitama Prefecture. From childhood, Soeno was very interested in martial arts, and learned Judo. Originally he found that Karate was not strong compared to Judo, but Karate was evolving and becoming much stronger. He first studied Wado-ryu Karate-Jujutsu a while.

He began the study of Kyokushin karate at the headquarters (honbu) of Kyokushin Kaikan at Ikebukuro, Tokyo, where founder Masutatsu Ōyama taught on September 1, 1964. Soeno practiced with the senior pupils who were Shigeru Ōyama, Yasuhiko Ōyama (both from The World Ōyama Karate in the United States - Shigeru is Sōshu and Yasuhiko is Saikō Shihan), Tadashi Nakamura and Hideyuki Ashihara at the time.

After entering Josai University, Soeno founded the Karate club and taught karate. Miyuki Miura was 2 years one's junior at the club. Soeno had reached the rank of shodan (1st degree black belt) on April 15, 1967.

=== Fighting career ===
Televised kickboxing was a huge boom from 1965 to 1975 when it was broadcast on the four TV stations, TBS, Nippon Television, TV Asahi and TV Tokyo all over Japan. TV Asahi requested a player from Kyokushin in February, 1969, and Masutatsu Ōyama elected Soeno and Terutomo Yamazaki to enter the competitions. Ōyama also founded a kickboxing gym called Kyokushin Gym where they practiced kickboxing about two months before entering the kickboxing competitions in April, 1969. Soeno fought in the welterweight division at kickboxing.

Kyokushin was planning to hold the First All-Japan Full Contact Karate Championships (AJFCKC) at the Tokyo Metropolitan Gymnasium in September, 1969. It was not only a karate championship, but martial artists of various kinds also participated in this competition. Athletes included Gidon Gaddary who was an Israeli Judo player weighing over 100 kilograms; Paul Jackson who was a heavyweight boxer from the United States; and three Muay Thai boxers from Lumpinee-ranked boxers including Birahon, Sakao and Samanso. The competition was fighting against other combative arts. The rules were simple: It was a foul to use a hand or elbow to the face and to attack a man's vital point. The players did not use any protection. They fought using bare hands, bare knees and bare legs. Soeno lost Yamazaki at finals and won 2nd place.

After graduating University, he opened ‘Soeno Dojo’ and ‘Soeno Gym’, giving lessons in both karate and kick-boxing. He also practiced Muay Thai in Bangkok, and Karate in the United States. He founded The World Karatedo Association Shidokan and The Japan Fighting Association New Fighting Shidokan in 1981.

== Personal life ==
Although had distanced himself from the Kyokushin Kaikan, he continued to have personal friendship with Mas Oyama, and the two would often meet at the sauna in Ikebukuro. When Mas Oyama died, Soeno had rushed to the Kyokushin headquarters and started crying on the spot.

He has tutored professional wrestlers Mitsuharu Misawa and Toshiaki Kawada in combat sports.

== Tournament history ==
- 1st Open Tournament All Japan Karatedo Championships, Runner-up
- 2nd All Japan Championship, 3rd place
- 4th All Japan Championship, 5th place

== See also ==
- Terutomo Yamazaki - another prestigious student of Mas Oyama.
- List of male kickboxers
- List of karateka
