= Miyuki Miura =

Japanese karateka

- Born: October 21, 1949 (age 76); Kisarazu, Chiba, Chiba Prefecture, Japan
- Style: Shotokan and Kyokushin Karate
- Teachers: Masutatsu Oyama, Yoshiji Soeno, Terutomo Yamazaki
- Rank: 8th dan karate

Other information
- Website: http://www.miuradojo.com

Miyuki Miura (三浦 美幸, Miura Miyuki; born October 21, 1949) is a prominent Japanese master of karate, first practising Shotokan, then Kyokushin, then World Ōyama, and now operating independently.

== Early life ==
Miura was born on October 3, 1949, in Kisarazu, Chiba, Japan, the son of a ship's engineer. He has one younger brother and one younger sister. Miura began training in Shotokan karate at the age of 13 years, and had been promoted to the rank of 2nd dan black belt by his 18th birthday. He also studied judo in his youth, achieving the rank of 1st dan in that art by the time he was 17. In 1967, aged 18, he began studying Kyokushin karate in a club at Josai International University. His teacher was Yoshiji Soeno at the university. Miura also studied this karate in summer vacation at the honbu dojo (headquarters training hall) of the Kyokushin in Tokyo.

== Kyokushin karate ==
After graduating from the university, Miura became an uchi deshi (live-in student) at the honbu dojo for two years. When Miura was an uchi deshi (live-in student), he studied karate from Terutomo Yamazaki, for whom Miura has expressed much respect. Miura entered the Third All-Japan Full Contact Karate Championships (AJFCKC) tournament and placed 4th in 1971. He won 1st at the Fourth AJFCKC in 1972, defeating Howard Collins, Toshikazu Satō, and Jōkō Ninomiya along the way.

Soon after Miura became champion, Masutatsu Oyama (founder and director of Kyokushin karate) asked him to participate in the 100-man kumite. The 100-man kumite involves fighting 100 karate practitioners, with each full contact match following immediately after the other. Miura completed the test in a little over 3 hours on April 13, 1972. In an interview, he recalled, "Mas Oyama told some of the younger students that if they beat me they would receive instant promotion. That made them very eager" (p. 48). He has also related that his entire body was swollen for several hours afterwards and that wherever on his body he placed his thumb, the swelling would rise to the second knuckle, and that for two days he required assistance when going to the toilet, as he could not bend on his own. He reached the rank of 4th dan black belt on March 18, 1973, and his physique is 1.80 m (5 ft 11 in), 75 kg (165 lb; 11.8 st).

== United States ==
After Miura completed the 100-man kumite, Oyama sent him to New York to study under Shigeru Oyama (a top Kyokushin instructor in America at the time), and from there he was sent to Chicago, Illinois, to run the Chicago Kyokushin dojo. In 1984, he began teaching as part of World Ōyama Karate, a new organization that had been founded by S. Ōyama. His Chicago dojo also served as the midwest headquarters for the organization.

In 2002, Miura parted company with S. Ōyama, and now no longer trains under the World Ōyama Karate organization. He operates independently as Miura Dojo in Elk Grove Village, Illinois, and works with other full contact dojo internationally through his Global Budo Karate Alliance. Miura holds the rank of 8th dan.
