= Tomasz Kucharzewski =

Polish-Canadian karateka and kickboxer

- Born: August 13, 1968; Częstochowa, Poland
- Died: March 8, 2008 (aged 39); Windsor, Ontario, Canada
- Nationality: Polish; Canadian
- Height: 6 ft 0 in (1.83 m)
- Weight: 225 lb (102 kg; 16.1 st)
- Division: Heavyweight; Heavyweight
- Style: Kyokushin karate, Shidokan karate
- Fighting out of: Windsor, Ontario

Tomasz Kucharzewski
Medal record

Representing Poland

Men's Kyokushin Karate

Polish National Championships
| Gold medal – first place | 1988 | Heavyweight |
| Gold medal – first place | 1989 | Heavyweight |
| Gold medal – first place | 1990 | Heavyweight |

European Oyama Cup
| Gold medal – first place | 1988 | Heavyweight |

Representing Canada

Men's Kyokushin Karate

Canadian National Championships
| Gold medal – first place | 1991 | Heavyweight |

Men's Enshin Karate

World Sabaki Challenge
| Gold medal – first place | Denver 1992 | Heavyweight |
| Silver medal – second place | Denver 1993 | Heavyweight |
| Gold medal – first place | Denver 1994 | Heavyweight |

Men's Shidōkan Karate

US International Championships
| Gold medal – first place | Chicago 1992 | Heavyweight |
| Gold medal – first place | Chicago 1993 | Heavyweight |
| Gold medal – first place | Chicago 1994 | Heavyweight |
| Gold medal – first place | Chicago 1995 | Heavyweight |
| Gold medal – first place | Chicago 1996 | Heavyweight |

World Championships
| Gold medal – first place | Tokyo 1994 | Heavyweight |

Australian Open
| Silver medal – second place | 1998 | Heavyweight |

Tomasz Kucharzewski (August 13, 1968 – March 8, 2008) was a Polish-Canadian martial artist. Kucharzewski initially gained fame while fighting competitively in Kyokushin kaikan and Shidōkan styles of karate. Though greatly successful in karate, he became more involved in kickboxing during his later career. A dominating force in the ring, Kucharzewski was described by the veteran karate instructor and journalist Roger Salick as "indestructible" following his fourth (of five) International Shidōkan Championship wins. He held notable victories over Glaube Feitosa and international karate champion Gerry Marketos.

== Early life and karate career ==
Born in Częstochowa, Kucharzewski began training in karate at the age of 14. He had won three Polish national titles in Kyokushin kaikan karate and one European title by the time he was 20. He moved to Canada in 1991 and settled in Windsor, Ontario, from where he participated in an estimated 300 fights. He achieved his greatest competitive success at this time, including two first-place wins in the annual US Sabaki Challenge and five consecutive gold medals at the International Shidokan Championships.

At the 1994 US International Shidokan Championships, Kucharzewski powered through opponent Christopher Harrison and knocked out Alain Grosdesormeaux with a knee strike en route to reaching the finals. The championship ended up being awarded to him without a fight, as his opponent Dontel Fleming forfeited the match in favor of hospitalization after experiencing concussion-like symptoms. The following year, Kucharzewski endured a bizarre, DQ-bound single round against Soneybourne Ali before knocking out international karate champion Gerry Marketos and claiming his fourth shidokan title in a hard-fought match against Akio Kobayashi.

== K-1 ==
With a substantial martial arts career already behind him, Kucharzewski accepted an invitation to K-1 - the era’s premier kickboxing organization. His initial bouts proved fruitless: he met Jean-Claude Leuyer and Lloyd van Dams at the K-1 USA Grand Prix '98 and K-1 Braves '99 events, and both defeated him with low kicks which injured his left knee. He fared considerably better at the K-1 USA Championships 2000 tournament, using substantial boxing skills to score TKO victories over American fighter Jason Johnson and future K-1 World Grand Prix finalist Glaube Feitosa. Despite a strong first round in the finals where he stunned opponent Andrei Dudko with a spinning back kick, Kucharzewski found his left leg under attack again and went to the canvas following two powerful low kicks, whereupon he was unable to meet the 10-count.

Kucharzewski fought twice more for K-1, his final match coming in the K-1 World Grand Prix 2001 Preliminary USA quarterfinals. After being pressed by opponent Duke Roufus throughout the first round, he suffered two knockdowns and the referee ended the fight.

== Death ==
During the later years of his life, Kucharzewski suffered a knee injury and ceased being as active in training and competition. He was found dead in his downtown Windsor apartment by family members on March 8, 2008. Although an autopsy was performed, the cause of death was not immediately known. Doctors claimed that his death could have been caused by cardiac arrhythmia.

== Personal life ==
Kucharzewski was known to his contemporaries for his calm and friendly demeanor. Albert Mady - his coach of 16 years - described him as "happy-go-lucky".

At his time of death, he worked at the Chromeshield steelmaking company in Windsor. He was unmarried and had no children.

== Titles ==
Karate

- 1988 Polish National Kyokushin Championships (Heavyweight) - 1st place
- 1988 3rd European Oyama Cup (Heavyweight) - 1st place
- 1989 Polish National Kyokushin Championships (Heavyweight) - 1st place
- 1990 Polish National Kyokushin Championships (Heavyweight) - 1st place
- 1991 Canadian National Kykokushin Championships (Heavyweight) - 1st place
- 1992 Sabaki Challenge US Open (Heavyweight) - 1st place
- 1992 US International Shidokan Championships (Heavyweight) - 1st place
- 1993 Sabaki Challenge US Open (Heavyweight) - 1st place
- 1993 US International Shidokan Championships (Heavyweight) - 2nd place
- 1994 Sabaki Challenge US Open (Heavyweight) - 1st place
- 1994 US International Shidokan Championships (Heavyweight) - 1st place
- 1994 Tokyo World Shidokan Championships (Heavyweight) - 1st place
- 1995 US International Shidokan Championships (Heavyweight) - 1st place
- 1996 US International Shidokan Championships (Heavyweight) - 1st place
- 1998 Australian Open Shidokan Championships (Heavyweight) - 2nd place

Kickboxing

- 1999 KICK World Super Heavyweight Muay Thai Champion
- K-1 USA Championships 2000 – Runner-up
- 2003 Tales of Pain Heavyweight Tournament - Runner-up

Amateur boxing

- 1993 Ontario Provincial Heavyweight Champion

== Kickboxing record (incomplete) ==
Kickboxing Record
| Date | Result | Opponent | Event | Location | Method | Round | Time | Record |
|---|---|---|---|---|---|---|---|---|
| 2003-06-28 | Loss | (United States) Carter Williams | Tales of Pain - Final | Chicago, United States | TKO (Doctor stoppage) | 1 | | |
Fight was for the Tales of Pain tournament title.
| 2003-06-28 | Win | (Canada) Giuseppe de Natale | Tales of Pain - Semifinals | Chicago, United States | | | | |
| 2003-06-28 | Win | (United States) Lane Collyer | Tales of Pain - Quarterfinals | Chicago, United States | TKO (Corner stoppage) | | | |
| 2001-05-05 | Loss | (United States) Duke Roufus | K-1 World Grand Prix 2001 Preliminary USA Quarterfinals | Las Vegas, United States | TKO (2 Knockdowns/Punches) | 1 | 2:26 | 69-8 |
| 2000-10-09 | Loss | (Japan) Hiromi Amada | K-1 World Grand Prix 2000 in Fukuoka Quarterfinals | Fukuoka, Japan | KO (Right Cross) | 1 | 1:49 | 69-7 |
| 2000-08-05 | Loss | (Belarus) Andrei Dudko | K-1 USA Championships 2000 Finals | Las Vegas, United States | KO (Right Low Kick) | 2 | 1:25 | 69-6 |
Fight was for the K-1 USA Championships 2000 title.
| 2000-08-05 | Win | (Brazil) Glaube Feitosa | K-1 USA Championships 2000 Semifinals | Las Vegas, United States | TKO (Referee Stoppage/Punches) | 1 | 2:03 | 69-5 |
| 2000-08-05 | Win | (United States) Jason Johnson | K-1 USA Championships 2000 Quarterfinals | Las Vegas, United States | TKO (2 Knockdowns/Right Cross) | 1 | 0:56 | 68-5 |
| 1999-06-20 | Loss | (Netherlands) Lloyd van Dams | K-1 Braves '99 Quarterfinals | Fukuoka, Japan | KO (Right Low Kick) | 2 | 1:48 | 61-4 |
| 1999-03-17 | Loss | (United States) Mike Vieira | Infusion '99 | Miami, Florida, United States | TKO (Doctor Stoppage/Right Overhand) | 1 | 3:00 | |
| 1998-08-07 | Loss | (United States) Jean-Claude Leuyer | K-1 USA Grand Prix '98 Quarterfinals | Las Vegas, United States | TKO (Corner Stoppage/Right Low Kick) | 1 | 3:00 | |
Legend: Win Loss Draw/No contest Notes

== Karate record (incomplete) ==
Karate Record
| Date | Result | Opponent | Event | Location | Method | Round | Time |
|---|---|---|---|---|---|---|---|
| 1996-00-00 | Win | (Japan) Shuji Abe | 1996 US International Shidokan Championships – Finals | Chicago, United States | TKO (Referee Stoppage/Knee) | 2 | |
Wins the 1996 US International Shidokan Heavyweight Championship.
| 1996-00-00 | Win | | 1996 US International Shidokan Championships – Semifinals | Chicago, United States | | | |
| 1996-00-00 | Win | | 1996 US International Shidokan Championships – Quarterfinals | Chicago, United States | | | |
| 1995-10-00 | Win | (Japan) Akio Kobayashi | 1995 US International Shidokan Championships – Finals | Chicago, United States | | | |
Wins the 1995 US International Shidokan Heavyweight Championship.
| 1995-10-00 | Win | (Canada) Gerry Marketos | 1995 US International Shidokan Championships – Semifinals | Chicago, United States | KO (Knee) | 1 | |
| 1995-10-00 | Win | (United States) Soneybourne Ali | 1995 US International Shidokan Championships – Quarterfinals | Chicago, United States | DQ | 1 | |
Ali was ejected from the arena after shoving the referee.
| 1994-00-00 | Win | (United States) Dontel Fleming | 1994 US International Shidokan Championships – Finals | Chicago, United States | Forfeiture (Unable to fight) | 1 | 0:00 |
Wins the 1994 US International Shidokan Heavyweight Championship. Fleming forfeited the match and was taken to the hospital after experiencing headaches and sensitivity to light.
| 1994-00-00 | Win | (Sint Maarten) Alain Grosdesormeaux | 1994 US International Shidokan Championships – Semifinals | Chicago, United States | KO (Knee) | 1 | |
| 1994-00-00 | Win | (United States) Christopher Harrison | 1994 US International Shidokan Championships – Quarterfinals | Chicago, United States | KO (Knee) | 1 | |
| 1993-04-17 | Loss | (United States) Patrick Smith | 1993 US Sabaki Challenge – Finals | Denver, United States | Decision | | |
Fight was for the 1993 US Sabaki Challenge Heavyweight Championship.
| 1993-04-17 | Win | (United States) Michael Gallant | 1993 US Sabaki Challenge – Semifinals | Denver, United States | Decision (Unanimous) | 1 | |
| 1993-04-17 | Win | (United States) Jay Pommrehn | 1993 US Sabaki Challenge – Quarterfinals | Denver, United States | Decision (Unanimous) | 2 | |
Legend: Win Loss Draw/No contest Notes
