= Tenkan =

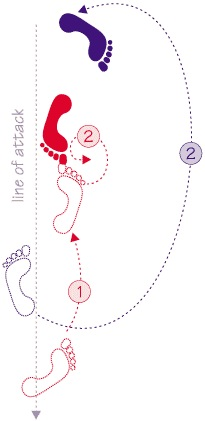
- Step diagram of technique

Technique name
- Rōmaji: Tenkan
- Japanese: 転換
- English: convert / divert

Tenkan (転換, lit. convert or divert) is the Japanese name of a movement practiced in several martial arts. It is a 180 degree pivot to the rear, on the lead foot. That is, if the left foot is forward, the pivot is clockwise, and if the right foot is forward, the pivot is counter-clockwise.

== Aikido ==
Tenkan is a very common foot move in aikido. Strategically, tenkan is most often used to place tori back-to-back with uke. A few attacks - techniques that commonly begin by executing tenkan include: shōmen'uchi - kaitennage; katate-dori - shihōnage; and morote-dori - kokyūnage.

Some styles of aikido practice six basic ashi sabaki (stepping/footwork) movements, of which tenkan is one.

Those six basic stepping techniques are:

- Tsugi-ashi (shuffle step)
- Ayumi-ashi (crossing step)
- Kaiten (hip shift to avoid attack)
- Tenshin (step and pivot to avoid attack)
- Tenkan (180 degree pivot to avoid attack)
- Ude-furi (spin step)

== Judo ==
Tenkan is a foot move used in judo.

== See also ==
- Aiki
- Irimi
- Uke
- Tori
- Throw
