= Kolyan Edgar =

Armenian martial artist (born 1986)

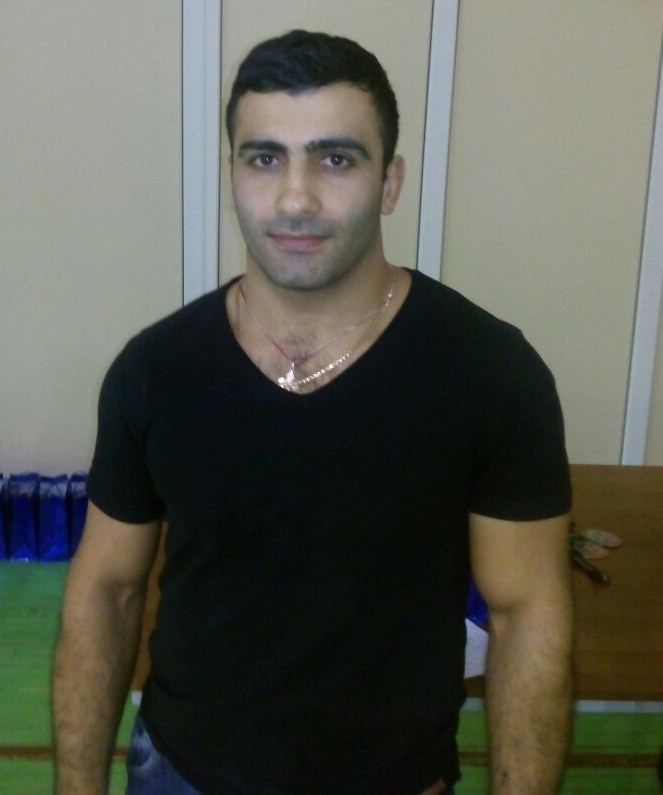
- Kolyan Edgar at the tournament in Kazan, October 29, 2016
- Born: Kolyan Edgar Rudikovich; January 9, 1986 (age 40); Artashat, Armenia, USSR
- Nickname: Kolyan
- Nationality: Russian
- Height: 1.61 m (5 ft 3 1/2 in)
- Weight: 67 kg (148 lb; 10.6 st)
- Style: Kūdō, Pankration, Armeyskiy Rukopashniy Boy
- Team: SK «Lider»
- Trainer: Sergey Maslov

Kolyan Edgar Rudikovich (Russian: Колян Эдгар Рудикович; born January 9, 1986) is an Armenian martial artist. His main focus is Kūdō and has had a prestigious history in Kudo competition. He has won various Kudo championships, namely has been a two-time world champion of kūdō in years 2005 and 2009. He also won the World Cup in kūdō (2011).

He participated in and won various tournaments in the Amateur Pankration and MMA. In all international tournaments since 2005 he has represented Russia. Prior to this, including the World Championships Kudo 2005, he represented Armenia.

He is a Honored Master of Sports of Russia in Kudo and Candidate for Master of Sports of Russia in Army hand-to-hand combat, Candidate for Master of Sports of Russia in Combat Sambo.
