= Footwork (martial arts) =

Concept in martial arts

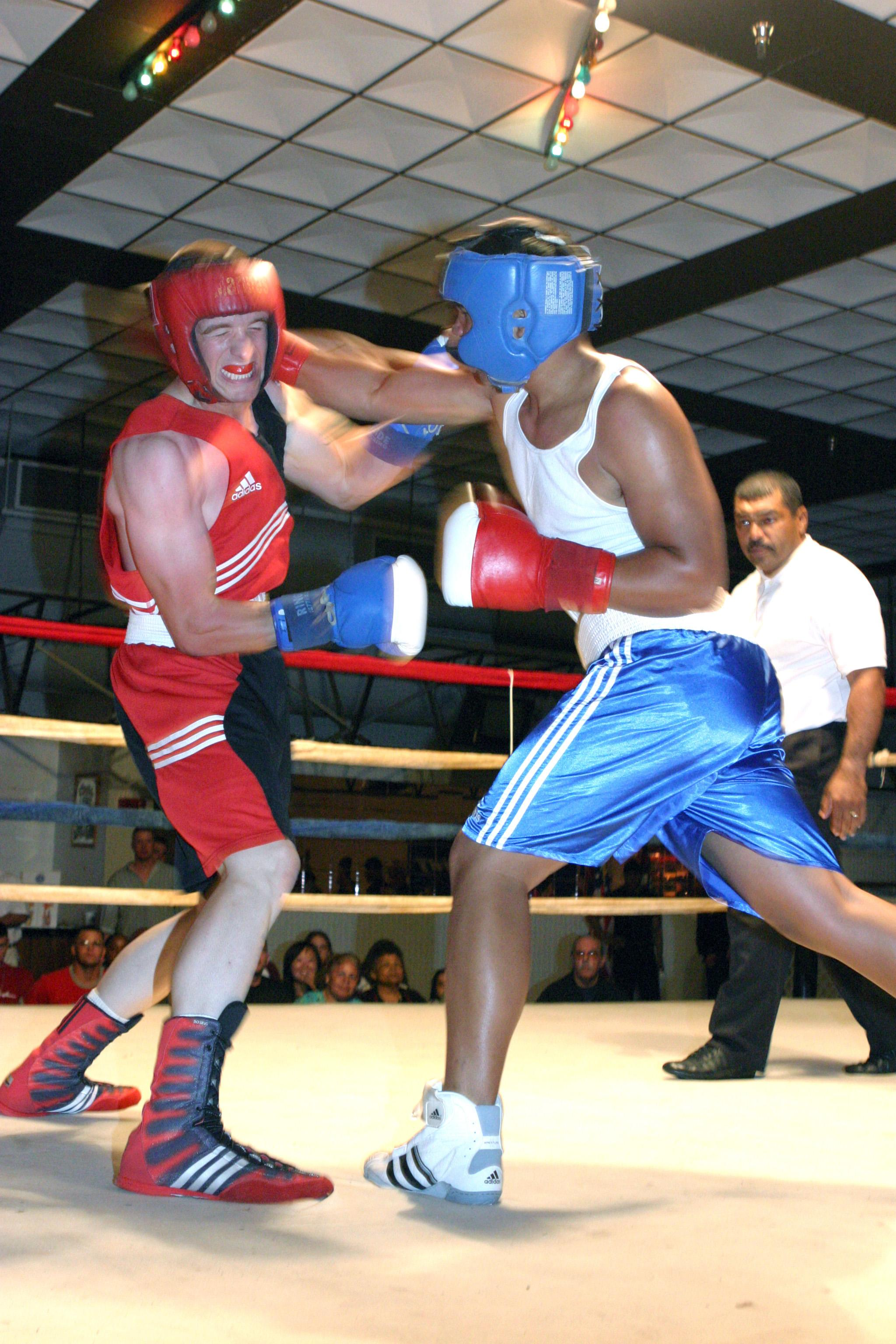
Footwork is essential in boxing.

Footwork is a martial arts and combat sports term for the general usage of the legs and feet in stand-up fighting. Footwork involves keeping balance, closing or furthering the distance, controlling spatial positioning, and/or creating additional momentum for strikes.

== Basic incarnations of footwork ==
=== Boxing footwork ===
The characteristic footwork employed by most of the world's major boxing and kickboxing styles, such as Western boxing and Muay Thai, has changed little over the centuries, and has remained largely invariable between radically different cultures. The boxer relies on 'push stepping'. In which the leading leg advances first, then the rear, with the feet coming to rest in the exact relative position.

Rear movement is a reversal of this step, and lateral movement involves push stepping in the same fashion, with the foot closest to the desired direction stepping laterally, followed by the opposite foot, which is used to move the body.

For the pugilist, footwork is to be deft and simplistic, allowing the fighter to move in and out of striking range as quickly as possible. Footwork is key to generating sufficient power in the basic strikes shared between the major boxing styles. During the jab, the lead foot can move forward to close distance or remain stationary. During the cross, the rear foot pivots inward to launch the rear shoulder forward, allowing the cross a good deal of its strength. During the left hook, the lead foot pivots in an inward manner to transfer body weight. The right hook's pivot is identical to the cross (assuming the boxer is orthodox). The lead uppercut, like the jab does not use any pivotal motion, the power comes from the transfer of body weight to the lead foot. The rear uppercut employs the same inward pivot as the cross. To maintain balance, both feet can step, pivot or slide as appropriate. The jab may be thrown while moving forward or backward; for the other punches it is advisable not to throw while in motion.

=== Kickboxing footwork ===
Kickboxing employs the same basic footwork pattern as the styles that focus only on the upper body, with the one key difference lying in the defense and positioning for lower body strikes. The kick-boxer will often shift his weight backward onto his rear leg to allow his leading leg to react more quickly to an incoming blow as in a 'shield,'(right) a defense used against a round kick, or to execute swift kicking maneuvers such as foot jabs and the Muay Thai teep or stop kick. Radical pivoting and sudden lead changes also accommodate the wider, more powerful movement of the knees and legs. In styles that allow for the clinch, the debased balance forces movement to be more squared, and footwork to be replaced by powerful thrusting or frenetic skipping movements with the sole purpose of keeping on one's feet.

In Thailand, Muay Thai fighters will often provoke attack by tapping their lead foot or by letting it rest in the air, both considered grievous insults within that nation.

=== Linear footwork ===
Linear movement is common to a great deal of the martial arts world, and is predominant in arts of Japanese and Korean influence such as many forms of Karate and Tae-Kwon-Do, as well as some grappling arts such as Jiu-Jitsu, Judo, Sambo and Shooto, and few forms of Chinese martial arts, such as Wing Chun and Bruce Lee's later incarnation, Jun Fan Gung Fu. Perhaps the most stark example of linear footwork, however, is that used in European fencing, especially within the modern sport aspect.

Dominated by the philosophy that the fastest and most economical way to an opponent is a straight line, arts that use linear movement as their focus adopt mostly rigid stances and behaviors, and focus primarily on the speed of advance and retreat to overcome an adversary. The striking arts of Japan and Korea utilize linear form quickly to overwhelm opponents with powerful, focused blows, whereas the Chinese arts primarily respect linear movement as a method of staying in reference to the opponent's centerline, and for its necessary use in trapping, or close-range grappling exchanges (See Chin Na).

Linear footwork's direct, sharp movements are natural for most grappling systems, which aim quickly to take an opponent to the floor with as little movement or adjustment as necessary. "Shooting," or rushing for the legs in order to execute a takedown, is a universal action that is an example of linear footwork's application.

=== Triangular footwork ===
This unique and highly versatile footwork pattern is popular within the arts that populate many of the nations that once composed the Majapahit Empire, including those of Malaysia, Indonesia, and the Philippines Principally Kali-Arnis-Escrima (see Escrima), Silat, Kuntao, and Panantukan. Diagonal or triangular footwork involves moving in triangular fashion as opposed to the direct forward or lateral movement present in boxing and other styles such as Karate or Tae-Kwon-Do.. For example, a user of triangular footwork will choose to advance or retreat at a diagonal to one's opponent, as to potentially set oneself into a superior position or attack or defense, and to disorient opponents that may not be familiar with this type of unconventional movement. Users of triangular footwork appear as if zigzagging along the points of many diamonds in randomized directions. The emphasis on evasion over blocking, as well as efficient counterattacking, is likely influenced by the significance of weapons, especially edged ones, in Kali-Arnis-Escrima and silat. Because the danger of exchanging weapon strikes is much higher risk than with empty hands, it is common practice to use triangular footwork to achieve a superior position to one's opponent to both avoid an attack as well as launching a counterattack before the opponent has a chance to recover.

There are three types of triangular movement: The male triangle pattern with involves retreating in a triangular pattern that is facing away from the practitioner, the female triangle pattern that has the practitioner advancing along an inverse triangle facing opposite of the fighter, and the lateral triangle, which involves moving in a triangular pattern to the right, and left of the practitioner.

Movement in a linear fashion is achieved, principally, by a "step and slide." The fighter will first move to the desired 'point' on the triangular matrix, then swiftly slide one's rear leg to meet his leading foot. From this position, the practitioner either rests one's foot to facilitate an attack or defense, or shoot his foot out to another point to complete another step and slide motion. Advanced users of triangular footwork literally "bounce" their rear feet off the ankle or heel area of their leading foot to jut out to another point as swiftly as possible, allowing for change of direction at incredible speed. The majority of the arts that utilize triangular footwork can effectively be practiced in either right or left leads interchangeably, so they are naturally suited for this manner of movement.

Panantukan, Filipino boxing, is an exception to the standard step and slide, as it features a hybrid footwork pattern that combines triangular movement with a boxing stance, and boxing's close attention to body mechanics. A Panantukan fighter will use his unique footwork to attempt to zone his opponent to achieve the perfect striking position.

=== Circular footwork ===
Circular movement patterns are an integral part of many forms of traditional Chinese martial arts, such as Baguazhang, Xingyiquan and Taijiquan, due principally to the strong influence of Tao philosophy. Circular footwork is also the basic method of movement in Enshin karate and derivative styles. Circular footwork functions in a way similar to triangular footwork, in that the martial artist advances towards his opponent at an angle in order to occupy the opponent's "blind spot." From here, the practitioner can strike more effectively while limiting his opponent's options for attack. Circular footwork is often considered more difficult to master than other types of footwork.

=== Unconventional footwork ===
Many styles of martial arts the world over contain footwork patterns that defy categorization. Such arts many Chinese Kung Fu styles that contain proliferant footwork methods that involve deep crouching, and closely mimic the movements and behaviors of animals, such as the tiger (harimau), monkey, or snake. The unique methods present within these arts make them philosophies unto themselves.

Brazilian martial art Capoeira uses footwork much like a dance to create offensive and defensive opportunities. Capoeirista use a side-to-side movement pattern known as ginga from which all other techniques are initiated.

An unconventional "dancing" style of footwork was popularized by heavyweight boxing champion Muhammad Ali in the 1960s. He moved side to side, and forward and back, while bouncing on the balls of his feet and dancing around his opponents. This allowed him to quickly move to wherever he wanted in the ring. He also occasionally shuffled his feet back and forth quickly, confusing his opponents before landing a blow, a move called the Ali shuffle. His unconventional footwork was referred to as the "dancing legs" at the time. The martial artist and actor Bruce Lee was influenced by Ali's footwork, which he studied and incorporated into his own Jeet Kune Do style of mixed martial arts. Ali's footwork also inspired a brief dance craze in Europe during 1966, mimicking Ali's footwork to a swinging up-tempo beat.

=== Footwork and weaponry ===
The presence of weapons can vastly influence how a fighter moves, in order to correctly accommodate the specific weapon in hand. Most forms of swordsmanship and stickfighting advocate that the lead foot be matched with the main hand, or hand that is currently clutching the weapon, as to allow the maximum possible reach to be achieved. This is also true for the use of knives and daggers, polearms, and flexible weapons. When using a weapon, reach is paramount to all other positioning options, thus the lead-to-lead rule is almost universally present, with few exceptions. Also, you generally want to shield your body with your weapon and not vice versa.

== See also ==
- Tai sabaki
