= Shidōkan Karate =

Style of knockdown karate

- Focus: Hybrid
- Country of origin: Japan
- Creator: Yoshiji Soeno
- Parenthood: Kyokushin Karate, Judo, Muay Thai
- Olympic sport: No
- Official website: https://shidokan.jp

Shidōkan (士道館) is an eclectic style of knockdown karate, founded by Yoshiji Soeno. Established in 1978, its governing body is the World Karate Association Shidokan, with its headquarters located in Ito City, Shizuoka Prefecture. Currently, it has branches in 68 countries.

Shidokan karate is sometimes described as the "Triathlon of Martial arts", as it encompasses full contact karate, Muay Thai, and grappling-based martial arts. Tournaments are full contact and are either held in a boxing ring or open mat.

== Overview ==
Yoshiji Soeno was a prestigious practitioner of Kyokushin Karate, having won second place in 1st Open All Japan Karatedo Championships. In addition to karate, he was also taught kickboxing and mixed martial arts.

Early on, his purpose was to create a style of karate that allowed strikes to face and use of knees.

Although Shidōkan is a stand-up fighting style that includes kicks, strikes, and punches found in most other styles of Karate combined with Muay Thai, it also utilizes numerous locks, sweeps, and throws often associated with Judo, Jiu-Jitsu and Wrestling.

== Ruleset ==
The main ruleset of Shidōkan Karate is a modified knockdown karate ruleset, performed without protective equipment. Like Kyokushin Karate, it allows punches and elbow strikes to the upper body, as well as kicks and knees to the leg, upper body and head. However unlike Kyokushin, it also allows 3 seconds of standing grappling; which encompasses Muay Thai, Judo, Wrestling as well as traditional Karate grappling techniques. Furthermore, 10 seconds of ground-based grappling with submissions and pins are also allowed.

However, Shidōkan Karatekas are encouraged to participate in a variety of rulesets as well as sparring no-rules for self-defence as well.

== Tournament ==
The "All Japan Karatedo Championships" and "Kanto Karatedo Championships" are held every year. At the Kanto Karatedo Championships, beginners and intermediates (from white belts to green belts) are allowed to participate. Their rules require wearing punching gloves and shin pads and ban throwing, ground fighting and sumo wrestling. In addition, the "National Boys and Girls Karatedo Tournament" is held every year in which boys and girls belonging to various karate groups including Shidokan participate.

== Karate and kickboxing divisions ==
The Shidokan has a dojo that combines a karate dojo and a kickboxing gym (Shido Murakami Juku, Iijima Dojo, Ueno Dojo, Shido Sekine Juku, Hibarigaoka Dojo, etc.). The karate and kick divisions are basically separated, but it is possible to practice both in the form of training (when a person who is a beginner from kick learns karate, of course, the basics of karate are one. Will learn from). Seidokaikan is different in that only advanced karate players can receive kick instruction.

There are many people who have actual experience as professional kickboxers in the Shidokan teachers and teachers.

== Famous practitioners ==
- Jean-Jacques Burnel, the bass guitarist of the English rock band The Stranglers - 7th degree black belt (nanadan) in Shidokan Karate and is head of Shidokan UK.
- Mitsuharu Misawa
- Toshiaki Kawada
- Shonie Carter - American mixed martial artist, UFC veteran.
- Tomasz Kucharzewski - Polish-Canadian martial artist with numerous gold medals from Full-Contact Karate events.
- Makoto Uehara
- Go Yokoyama - Japanese kickboxer who competes in the welterweight division.
- Masaaki Kato
- Masaaki Mochizuki

== See also ==
- Kūdō Daidōjuku - fairly similar style of full-contact Karate that allows grappling. In addition, it is practiced with headgear and headbutts are legal.
- Full contact karate
- Yoshiji Soeno
