= Karate South Africa =

Governing body of sport karate in South Africa

- Abbreviation: KSA
- Formation: 1992
- Legal status: Federation
- Location: South Africa
- Members: World Karate Federation
- President: Sonny Pillay
- Website: karate-sa.org

The Karate South Africa (KSA) is the governing body of sport karate in South Africa. The KSA was formed in June 2005 after the previous body (KASA) was disbanded by the then Minister of Sport. The new body came into being under the supervision of the South African Sports Council. It has membership to the World Karate Federation (WKF) which is the only body recognized by the International Olympic Committee (IOC) and was readmitted to the international arena in 1992. In May 2008, after three years of ups and downs, the interim structure was formalized at a General Elections held under the supervision of SASCOC and the current executive was voted in. The President of the KSA is Sonny Pillay.

== History ==
Karate is a martial arts which was introduced in South Africa in 1950 by people who developed an interest in this eastern culture through reading books and receiving information from sailors who visited South African ports. During the early 1960s, a few South Africans visited Japan and formally studied the art of karate. This international exposure was generally reciprocated with the visit by top Japanese karate instructors.

These pioneers initiated the development and expansion of karate to what today has become the sixth biggest sport in the country with a membership which exceeds 200,000 with more than 1,400 organised clubs throughout South Africa.

On 19 May 1992, the Karate Association of South Africa was formed, unifying karate as a sport among the various national karate bodies which existed. Today, through the initiatives of KASA, all the various styles of karate and provinces are totally unified under one body which controls karate in South Africa.

Karate South Africa was formed in June 2005, after the previous body (KASA) was disbanded by the then Minister of Sport. The new body came into being under the supervision of the South African Sports Council.
