= Irimi =

Direct entrance into technique, in martial arts

Japanese name
- Kanji: 入り身
- Hiragana: いりみ
Transcriptions
- Revised Hepburn: irimi

In Japanese martial arts, Irimi (入り身) is the act of entering straight into a technique, as opposed to the more indirect entrance into technique called tenkan. In basic training, irimi usually looks like a step forward, straight or at an angle but usually ending with the body facing the attacker, rather than in the direction of the step. To enter with irimi, the defender needs to move in the very moment of the attack or even himself initiate it.

== Aikido ==
Meaning: Entering or putting in the body.

Irimi (ee-ree-mee) is the second pillar of Aikido (Aikido techniques are structured around six main pillars). Irimi involves entering deeply around or behind an attack to defuse or neutralize the attack. The concept of irimi teaches one to blend with or enter into an opponent's attack to become one with the opponent's movement and leaving the opponent with nowhere to strike. This movement is utilized during the moment of the opponent's attack. To complete the movement, one moves out of the opponent's line of attack to the opponent's shikaku, or blind spot. When executed properly, one can strike an opponent with great force, combining his attacking momentum and one's forward movement.

The entering principle is basic to most Aikido movements as the postures and movements in Aikido contain quite a few oblique stances which are adapted from Sōjutsu (spear fighting).

In Aikido, there are numerous examples of techniques exhibiting the concepts of yin and yang. Irimi and tenkan are an example. Tenkan is the motion of turning (yin) and irimi is the motion of entering (yang).

Irimi is one of two motions Aikido students perform in the role of nage. Practicing irimi will help the Aikido student develop Hara, balance, and groundedness.

In Yoshinkan aikido irimi techniques are denoted by the number one (and tenkan as two).

In modern aikikai irimi techniques are referred to as omote (and tenkan as ura).
