= Kazuyoshi Ishii =

Japanese karateka

- Born: June 10, 1953 (age 73); Uwajima, Ehime Prefecture, Japan
- Style: Seidokaikan karate
- Teacher: Hideyuki Ashihara

Other information
- Notable students: Masaaki Satake, Nobuaki Kakuda

Kazuyoshi Ishii (石井 和義, Ishii Kazuyoshi; born June 10, 1953) is a Japanese karateka, promoter, and businessman.. He was born in Uwajima City, Ehime Prefecture. Graduated from Ehime Prefectural Uwajima Higashi High School.

He is known as the founder of Seidokaikan, a karate organization, and the founder of K-1, a martial arts promotion which became a pioneer in mixed martial arts events.

K-1 Founder and advisor/Director of Seimichi Kaikan/ARISF.GAISF. (IOC-recognized international federation of sports organizations, international sports federation) Kickboxing WAKO JAPAN/FIKA/Originally based on the manga "Dorukara".

== Early life ==
Ishii was born on June 10, 1953, in Uwajima, Ehime Prefecture, Japan. He is one of three siblings. As a boy, he was interested in sumo and baseball, and was also introduced to gymnastics. While Ishii was in junior high school, a book by Masatoshi Nakayama sparked his interest in Shotokan karate, but a Sonny Chiba film later inspired him to pursue training in Kyokushin karate.

== Karate debut ==
Ishii began training in Kyokushin karate under Hideyuki Ashihara, who was then a senior instructor in Kyokushin's International Karate Organization (IKO). By the time he was 16 years old, he had established a local Kyokushin dojo (training hall) under his instructor's supervision. Six years later, in 1975, he opened a Kyokushin dojo in Osaka, and this was a very successful venture.

When Ashihara left the IKO a few years later, Ishii followed, but then left Ashihara's organization after only a few months. He founded his own organization, Seidokaikan Karate, in 1980. Ishii's organization had dojo in the Kansai region. Within the next two years, he was promoting televised full-contact karate tournaments. In 1983, Ishii became the first Chairman of the newly formed All Japan Budo Promotion Association. Seidokaikan's reputation grew as Ishii's students, such as Masaaki Satake, Toshiyuki Yanagisawa, and Toshiyuki Atokawa, earned tournament victories.

== Ashihara Dojo ==
In January 1969, Entered Kyokushin Kaikan Shikoku Branch Ashihara Kaikan (Ashihara Dojo) Uwajima Branch and became a disciple of Hideyuki Ashihara. In the same year, there were Hikaru Ninomiyagi (Enshin Kaikan) and Nariaki Takami (Karate-do Takami Karate).

== Training period ==
With the legs and hips trained through baseball and the flexibility cultivated through gymnastics, he achieved his black belt (first degree) in just over a year. After failing the university entrance exam, he relied on his older brother who lives in Osaka to live as a ronin, and while attending art school, he aimed to enter Tokyo University of the Arts, but since most of the students at the school were good at drawing, he gave up on going to university and got a job at a trading company in Osaka.

== Osaka branch launched ==
In 1975, at the age of 22, at the behest of Ashihara, he established the Kyokushin Kaikan Ashihara Dojo Osaka branch in a cultural classroom inside the Osaka Stadium/Osaka Baseball Stadium.

In 1976, "He was an office worker during the day and a karate teacher at night, but due to an increase in the number of students, Ashihara asked him to devote himself to teaching karate, so he quit his job.

As Ashihara's right-hand man, he became the general manager of the Kansai region, and worked hard to expand the dojo, expanding branches to Kobe, Kyoto, Nara, Sakai, and Okayama, and instructing 50,000 students.

That year, Takeo Nakayama (runner-up at the 9th Open Tournament All-Japan Karate Tournament sponsored by Kyokushin Kaikan, winner of the 1st and 2nd Knockdown Open Tournament All-Japan Karatedo Championships sponsored by Seido Kaikan) and Hideki Matsumoto (Eibukan) became students."

== Seido Kaikan established ==
In June 1980, became independent and established New Japan Karatedo Federation Seidokan and New Japan Student Karatedo Federation in the Nishinari Sangyo Hall in Kishisato, Osaka, and became director.

In 1981, the name was changed to Seido Kaikan and the tournament was held every year. Afterwards, Masaaki Satake, Nobuaki Tsunoda, Satoshi Yanagisawa, and others participated in karate tournaments of other schools, and Seido Kaikan was known as the ``Ever-Winning Corps.''

In June 1990, after participating in the All Japan Kickboxing Federation tournament, the company entered the world of boxing (however, even before that, it had been inviting professional hopefuls to compete in kickboxing matches under the name Prince Gym). )

== As a promoter ==
Following almost a decade of development, Ishii staged the inaugural K-1 tournament in Yoyogi Hall, Tokyo, in April 1993. According to The Japan Times, the "K" element came from kakutogi (a Japanese collective noun for combat techniques) and the "1" element came from the competition's single weight division and the champion's unique position (given the single weight division). According to Black Belt magazine, Ishii said that he chose the "K" element since it was the first letter in the names of karate, kickboxing, kung fu, kempo, and many other combative arts. K-1's official website states that the "K" element also stands for "King."

Over the next ten years, the K-1 competition expanded to 24 events each year, across Japan, Europe, and North America. In January 2003, Black Belt magazine named Ishii as its Man of the Year for 2002. Together with late K-1 fighter Andy Hug (1964–2000), Ishii supported the production of Street Fighter II: The Animated Movie (where he voiced the character of Fei-Long in the original Japanese audio) by creating fight scenes that utilized real-life combat techniques. In the PlayStation video game titled K-1 Revenge, he also appears as the fighting boss "Master Ishii", whose character can be unlocked in the video game when completing the single player mode for the first time.

== Mixed martial arts battle ==
In 1990, entered the world of boxing after participating in the All Japan Kickboxing Federation tournament.

In 1991, partnered with Hiroaki Maeda's mixed martial arts entertainment company ``Rings'' and absorbed entertainment know-how.

In March 1992, it held the ``Martial Arts Olympics,'' which later became the predecessor of K-1, and is now regarded as the predecessor of K-1.

== K-1 launch ==
In April 1993, "K-1 GRAND PRIX '93" held as part of Fuji TV's event "LIVE UFO"

In 1996, Promoted from Sunday afternoon slot to weekend prime time. Nippon Television Broadcasting Network | Nippon Television, TBS Television | Broadcast begins on TBS and commercial stations.

In 1997, appeared as himself in the movie ``Ultraman Zeath #2 | Ultraman Zeath 2 Superhuman Wars: Light and Shadow'' along with Nobuaki Tsunoda and Andy Hug.

In 2001, serves as a Thursday radio personality on Nippon Broadcasting System's radio program "All Night Nippon R". In December of the same year, he planned "INOKI BOM-BA-YE 2001" as part of the K-1 Japan movement, contracted with Nippon Television, and participated in the production direction and as the commander-in-chief of the K-1 Army. The name "INOKI BOM-BA-YE 2001" was decided upon Antonio Inoki's request. This event also evolved into Dynamite!

== Dynamite held at the National Stadium with 100,000 people gathered ==
In August 2002, Holds "Dynamite! SUMMER NIGHT FEVER in Kunitachi" (sponsored by TBS) and serves as general producer (operation is entrusted to PRIDE (martial arts event)|Dream Stage Entertainment|DSE, which hosts PRIDE). The main character is Antonio Inoki. The event will draw 100,000 spectators (according to organizers) to the National Stadium, the largest crowd in martial arts history.

== Successfully held the three major dome tournaments in Tokyo, Osaka, and Nagoya. ==
In December 2002 On December 7, the K-1 World Grand Prix 2002 final was held at Tokyo Dome. Tickets sold out for 50,000 people, and total event sales were approximately 1 billion yen. It will be the largest martial arts event in the history of Tokyo Dome. On December 31, the hosting of "INOKI BOM-BA-YE 2002" was transferred from Nippon Television to TBS. Held at Saitama Super Arena. As a subprogram on NHK Kohaku, it achieved a viewership rating of 16.7%.

== Restart ==
In June 2009, the site launched the Kancho Channel on YouTube.

In June 2009, on June 10th, he published his autobiography "Karate Super Baka Ichidai". At the publication party on the 12th, he said, ``From now on, I will basically no longer be in the ring giving greetings, sitting in the commentary booth, or working as a producer for the current K-1 organization.K-1's amateur organization. "In order to spread the sport worldwide, we will focus our efforts on establishing the International K-1 Federation (FIKA), an organization similar to the International Federation of Football Associations (FIFA) and the International Olympic Committee (IOC)."

In July 2009, on July 22, Yukan Fuji's website ZAKZAK featured a column entitled "[Kancho Ishii's Kai! Diet School]" which talks about dieting methods that utilize the knowledge gained through healthy eating and reading. A weekly series has started.

In December 2009, on December 5, during the K-1 rules practical explanation before the opening ceremony of the K-1 WORLD GP 2009 FINAL, he entered the ring as the ``Special Competition General Producer'' in place of Nobuaki Tsunoda, who was suspended from work. This was his first return to the field in seven years since 2002.

In 2010, the content of the column often deviates from topics related to dieting, and since the content of these digressions was well-received by readers, the title was changed to ``[Kancho Ishii's Kai! Life School]'' to cover various topics and behind-the-scenes stories from the martial arts world. I also write about.

In 2011, after learning about K-1's unpaid fight money issue, it was reported that a new martial arts world tournament would be launched in 2012. It owned the trademarks for K-1 and the mixed martial arts event HERO'S, but has transferred the rights to real estate developer Barbizon. On November 3, the establishment of the International K-1 Federation (FIKA) was announced in Beijing.

== kickboxing - JKL (Japan Kickboxing League Organization) ==
In 2023, we talked about the world kickboxing world with Mr. Roy Baker, president of the World Associations of Kickboxing Organizations (WAKO), and provided various advice for the further development of the industry. Appointed as an advisor. This will be the official and only representative contact point for Japan. (*WAKO is the only organization in the kickboxing industry that is a member of the International Olympic Committee (IOC).WAKO member countries are 130 countries on five continents, of which 105 countries have national Olympic committees or government sports organizations. It is a unified kickboxing organization officially recognized by the authorities.

In October 2023, established Japan Kickboxing League Organizations (JKL), a general incorporated association. The purpose of this organization is to supervise, operate, and manage amateur kickboxing competitions in Japan, develop Japan's representative athletes and youth, build mutual communities, etc., and contribute to revitalizing the industry, improving the environment, and promoting sports. Signed a contract with the Japanese branch.

In November 2023, the Japan Kickboxing League (JKL), which is WAKO's only contact point in Japan, is a general incorporated association consisting mainly of administrative organizations in each prefecture that participate in the national tournament for selecting Japan's amateur kickboxing players. resolution body and Under the JKL general meeting of staff, an executive committee consisting of representatives from each prefecture under the board of directors, a third-party evaluation committee that is an advisory body to the JKL general meeting of staff, and planning, management, and training under the chairman of the board, various committees to conduct research and research, and a secretariat that will become a corporate organization will be established. In order to determine various policies related to the management of JKL, these organizations conduct various discussions, formulate future plans, conduct research, and carry out related practical work aimed at the development of JKL, Japanese Kickboxing, and Japanese sports.

In December 2023, he started the Japan Kickboxing League (JKL) with the three philosophies of "spreading kickboxing around the world," "promoting a rich sports culture," and "creating a peaceful world free of conflict." The kickboxing family around the world is formed with WAKO (World Kickboxing Association) at the top, WAKO Asia (Asian Kickboxing Association), and other continental associations and national organizations. Established with the aim of becoming a member organization of the Japanese Olympic Committee (JOC) and the Japan Sports Association (JSPO). As the only organization that trains amateur kickboxing athletes and sends them to world tournaments, we have begun sending athletes representing Japan to various international tournaments around the world.

== See also ==
- Sadaharu Tanikawa
- Pierre Andurand
- Chatri Sityodtong
- Simon Rutz
- Eduard Irimia
