= Tai sabaki =

Term from Japanese martial arts

Step diagram for a 180 degree taisabaki

Tai sabaki (体捌き) is a term used in Japanese martial arts for body movement or body management. It generally refers to repositioning the body in response to an attack, often by moving away from the line of attack while maintaining a position from which a technique can be applied.

Tai sabaki is used in martial arts such as kendo, jujutsu, aikido, judo, karate and ninjutsu. Although it is sometimes described as evasion, the term is broader than simply avoiding an attack because it also includes positioning the body for a counterattack, throw, or other technique.

An example of tai sabaki is 'moving off the line' of attack using irimi and tenkan movements rather than to 'move against' the attack. This implies the use of harmony rather than physical strength. See hard and soft (martial arts)

Tai sabaki is related to ashi sabaki (footwork) and te sabaki (handwork).

== Kata ==
Tai sabaki is also the name of a group of kata created by Yasuhiro Konishi under the tutelage of Ueshiba Morihei, the creator of aikido. These kata were named Tai sabaki Shodan, Tai sabaki Nidan and Tai sabaki Sandan and are some of the original kata of Shindo Jinen-ryu style of karate, created by Yasuhiro Konishi.

All three katas were created on the basis of the Tai sabaki movements and the circular motions of aikido. Although they do not contain complex movements, the whole kata is to be performed as a chain of movements without a specific pause.
