= Hideyuki Ashihara =

Japanese karateka

- Historical photo of Hideyuki Ashihara
- Born: December 5, 1944; Hiroshima, Japan
- Died: April 24, 1995 (aged 50); Matsuyama, Japan
- Style: Ashihara kaikan
- Teachers: Masutatsu Oyama; Jon Bluming

Other information
- Children: Hidenori Ashihara
- Notable students: Kazuyoshi Ishii, Jōkō Ninomiya

Hideyuki Ashihara (芦原 英幸, Ashihara Hideyuki; December 5, 1944 – April 24, 1995) was a Japanese master of karate who founded Ashihara karate in 1980 with the emphasis on Sabaki. He is often attributed as one of the originators of the tai sabaki (whole body movement) method, although the concept was already very common in other martial arts, such as judo. He was known for his weapon skills including shuriken and tonfa.

== Early life ==
Ashihara was born on December 5, 1944, outside Hiroshima in Japan. He was raised by his grandparents in a small village called Nomicho. As a boy he was a restless soul and often got into fights. He first came into contact with Budo when he started training in Kendo at the age of 10 to get an outlet for his energy.

In 1960, when Ashihara was 15 years old, he moved to Tokyo and started working at a petrol station. This was his working place for six years. In September 1961, he first entered a karate club. He saw karate practitioners train and spar hard and realistically, something he liked immediately. The club was Oyama Dojo, later the Kyokushinkai Honbu Dojo run by Masutatsu Oyama.

He allegedly trained intensely and participated in every possible training session. It is said that his stubbornness and perseverance finally made it possible for him to grade to Shodan on March 26, 1964. He was then only 19 years old, and no one at the dojo could defeat him in kumite.

== Kyokushin Instructor ==
In 1966, Ashihara was made instructor in Kyokushinkai Karate at the Honbu Dojo. He performed well, and it was decided that he would have the honour of travelling to Brazil to instruct and spread Kyokushinkai Karate, something he had dreamed of for years.

However, Ashihara got into a fight with five persons who attacked him on the street, all of whom he defeated. The police brought him into questioning, and the whole incident was reported to the Kyokushinkai Honbu Dojo. He was suspended from all training. After two months suspension he was pardoned and sent to Nomura on the island Shikoku in southern Japan.

After three months, he was called back to Tokyo and received a new chance to travel to Brazil. This time he declined. He wanted to return to Nomura and continue the work he had started there. This was granted, and his reputation as a fighter and instructor started to spread in that part of Japan.

Nomura soon became too small, and he moved to the neighbouring city of Yawatahama. He quickly founded one of the biggest Kyokushinkai clubs in Japan, and the activities were extended to two additional cities, Uwa and Uwajima.

It was during this period that the concept of Sabaki was developed by him. Three principal points for Ashihara Karate were formed. Preparation, and the use of the four positions represented by the circular symbol of Ashihara Karate became the first point. The importance of timing and evaluation of distance (maai) became the second point. The third point is the stance, which must always be maintained whatever the situation to give maximum mobility.

He expanded to the city of Matsuyama, and Ashihara Karate quickly became popular there as well. He started to instruct the police force, and universities started clubs in the area. Clubs were also established in Hiroshima, Osaka, Kyoto, Kobe, Nara, Shiga and other places.

In March 1978, the construction of the Dojo in Matsuyama commenced and he moved there at the end of the year. In 1979, the building was completed. He was still associated with the Kyokushinkai organisation, but instructors in neighbouring districts were complaining about his expansion of clubs. To avoid conflict within Kyokushinkai, he choose to resign from actively practising Karate at an official meeting in Tokyo in March 1978. He announced that he was willing to give up leadership for the clubs, as he had intended to concentrate on running his club in Matsuyama. It turned out that this was not enough, and he was expelled from Kyokushinkai shortly thereafter, following urge by competing instructors.

== Ashihara Karate ==
It was with this background that he created the New International Karate Organisation (NIKO) - Ashihara Karate Kaikan in September 1980 based at his Dojo in Matsuyama and adopted the title Kancho (Grandmaster).

Students include Joko Ninomiya, Kazuyoshi Ishii and Makoto Yoshida. Joko Ninomiya was a very successful tournament fighter (8th 1973 All-Japan, 3rd 1975 World Open, 2nd 1976 All-Japan and 1978 All-Japan champion) and would later go on to establish Enshin Karate in 1988. Ninomiya described him as his "first and only karate teacher". Kazuyoshi Ishii established the Seidokaikan karate style and later created the K-1 kickboxing competitions. Makoto Yoshida, who changed his name to Makoto Hirohara, was a successful tournament fighter (1987 Sabaki US Open Karate Challenge Heavyweight champion and again in 1988) and his student was the 1991 Middleweight Sabaki Challenge champion (Enshin karate). He established Shintaiikudo karate in 1995.

In 1987, he developed signs of illness. He had ALS, a rare disease of the nervous system also known as Lou Gehrig's disease. In the beginning of the 1990s, his condition worsened, until he died on April 24, 1995, in Matsuyama at only 50 years old. Over 1000 people attended his funeral.

Three autobiographies were written, the first in 1981 "Sasurai Karate. Kagiri naki Charenji Supirittu", the second in 1986 "Karate ni moe karate ni ikiru", and the third "inochi no kotoba : Karate o aisuru hitobito e" translated is titled "The Word of life: For those who love Karate" was published after his death with the final chapter written by senior Honbu instructor Hiroshi Harada.
