= Kūdō =

Japanese martial art

Kūdō (空道)
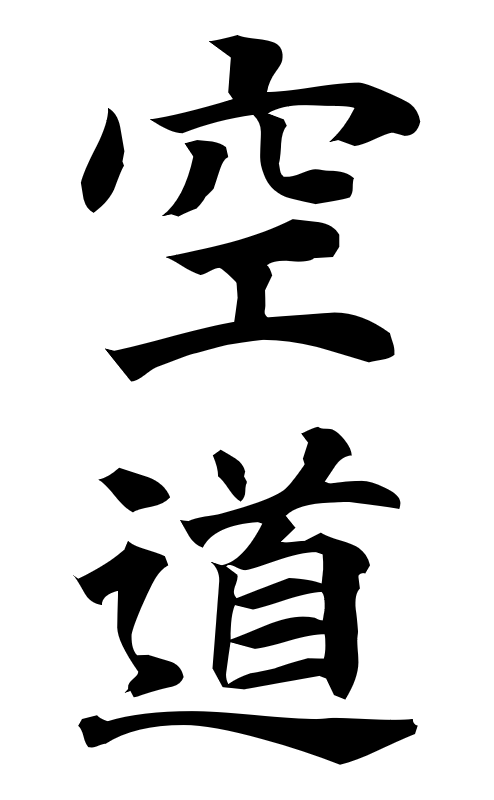
- Kūdō written in kanji
- Also known as: Kakuto Karate (1981–2001); Combat Karate Daidojuku
- Focus: Hybrid
- Country of origin: Japan
- Date of formation: 1981 (Daidojuku and Kakuto Karate); 2001 (Kudo)
- Creator: Takashi Azuma
- Parenthood: Karate, Judo, Boxing, Kickboxing, Muay Thai, Jiu-Jitsu, Brazilian Jiu-Jitsu
- Official website: Kudo International Federation (KIF); Daido Juku

Kūdō (空道) (formerly known as Daido Juku) is a Japanese hybrid martial art. It is a full-contact combat sport that aims to achieve safety, aggression and practicality, a style of mixed martial arts practised with headgear and gloves. It features stand-up striking, with throwing and grappling techniques being also allowed in the competition, including restraint, locks and chokeholds.

Kūdō is a form of budō (modern martial arts) that originated in the Daido Juku school, an organization founded by Azuma Takashi in 1981. The relationship between the Daido Juku school and kudo is similar to that between the kodokan school and judo.

Kūdō is found in more than 100 locations in Japan and is practised in more than 50 countries around the world. Although it is a martial art created by the Japanese, Russia currently has the largest number of Kūdō athletes, eclipsing the number of Japanese practitioners.

== History ==
=== Takashi Azuma and conception of Daido juku ===
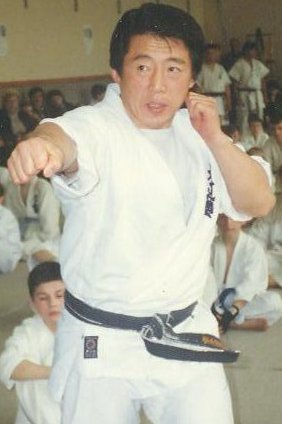
Azuma Takashi

Takashi Azuma (東孝, Azuma Takashi) (born 1949 in Kesennuma, Japan - 3 April 2021) was the founder of Kūdō and the President of the Kudo International Federation. He held a 9th degree black belt in Kyokushin Budokai (awarded by Jon Bluming), a 3rd degree black belt in judo, and a 9th degree black belt in Kūdō.

Azuma came in contact with budo for the first time when he entered the judo club of his school in Kesennuma at the age of 16 in 1965. In 1972 after his service in the Japanese armed forces, he joined Kyokushin Karate. That same year he founded a Kyokushin branch at Waseda University.

In 1981, Azuma founded his own martial art because he was unhappy with some characteristics of Kyokushin. Azuma was bothered that in Kyokushin serious head injuries are common. Azuma was also of the opinion that physically smaller fighters are at a disadvantage compared to bigger fighters. Especially he had his own experiences of receiving so many nasty blows that his nose got bent out of its place. In his book, he quotes that he was "good at grabbing the collar and head-butting in a fight" and felt full-contact rules of Kyokushin very limiting.

One of the fundamental precepts in Daidojuku was the creation of a realistic and versatile fighting style that encompassed effective offensive and defensive techniques including head punches, elbows, headbutts, throws and joint-locks from Judo combined with other ground fighting techniques. Azuma's early development of a martial art was first a hybrid of Kyokushin Karate and Judo. Kyokushin was the basis, however, the regulations changed dramatically. The style would not have been limited by the boundaries of a single style but would have used techniques from different martial arts, not just the initial judo and karate mix. Later in the 1980s and 1990s, this style began to include several martial arts techniques such as boxing, muay thai, jujitsu, wrestling, and others all merged in the style of Daidojuku. Protective clothing was introduced, which allowed hand techniques to the head, and provides sufficient protection to the head during kicking techniques.

=== Early Daido juku and Kakutō karate ===
The Daido Juku organization became operational on February 17, 1981. The first dojo was opened in Miyagi prefecture under the name "Karate-do Daidojuku." The in-house martial arts style was also known as Kakutō karate (格闘空手, eng. Fighting Karate) and/or Combat Karate Daidojuku.

In the same year, Daidojuku's alumni made its competition debut at the "1981 Hokutoki Karate Championships".

Daidojuku played a part in the late '80s and early '90s martial arts boom in Japan, being one of the few mixed martial arts organizations in the martial arts industry at the time. It is credited in helping K-1 and the "U-series" promotions to reach the Japanese mainstream. Minoki Ichihara was a Kakuto Karate practitioner from Daidojuku who fought in UFC 2, being the first Japanese fighter to participate in the UFC in a time when Japanese martial arts organizations were reluctant to take on the challenge of the UFC. However, Ichihara would lose to Royce Gracie.

In the 1990s, Daidojuku held kickboxing events known as THE WARS, which was centred on "gloved" ruleset of full contact karate, and showcased Daido juku's top talents.

In the media, there were many voices waiting for the dream confrontation between Kenichi Osada, who was the ace of Daido Juku, and Masaaki Satake of Seidokaikan. Athletes belonging to Daido Juku were displayed on the covers of various martial arts magazines, and in the martial arts world at that time, the Daidojuku along with Seidokaikan served as the forefront of Japanese martial arts.

In 1995 the name of the "Karate Do Daidojuku" association officially changed to "Kakuto Karate International Federation Daidojuku" (KKIF).

=== Kudo, the new direction and present ===
From the mid-1990s, Daidojuku would move away from media-centric promotion and return to the original course of developing the "safe yet practical" style that Daido Juku had been aiming for since its establishment.

In 2001, Takashi Azuma, founder and president of daidojuku, held an official press conference where he announced that the style promoted by daidojuku will be now referred to as Kudo, becoming its own budō martial art. The relationship between the Daido Juku school and kudo is similar to that between the kodokan school and judo. In the same year, Daidojuku launched the first world championship competition to great success, launching Kudo to the international stage.

Managed under the principles of budō, Kudo is governed globally by the Kudo International Federation (K.I.F.), which oversees the certification and registration of its instructors. The organization is recognized by the Japanese Ministry of Education, Culture, Sports, Science and Technology as a social and physical education entity.

On April 3, 2021, Azuma died due to stomach cancer, leaving the position of president of Daido Juku to Kenichi Osada.

== Exchange with other organizations ==
In the 1990s, Daidojuku would exchange talent with numerous martial arts organizations, until ceasing the activity after conception of Kudo. In the 1990s Daidojuku had agreements with Submission Arts Wrestling (SAW), and after that would interact with entities from Wushu, Sanshou, Aikido S.A., Paraestra and Hatenkai. In addition, certain fighters from Daidojuku would go fight in other martial arts organizations, such as RISE, etc.

Daidojuku used to compete with other martial arts bodies, such as Nippon Kempo and Shooto. In the past, the organization has had clashes with practitioners of Muay Thai, Sanshou and Taekwondo as well.

== International spread ==
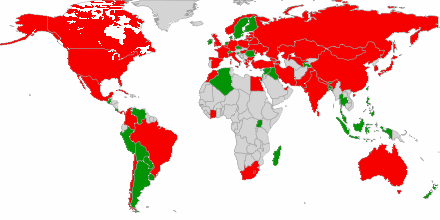
Member countries (red) and candidate member countries (green) of the Kudo International Federation (October 31, 2011)

Kudo has more than 100 locations in Japan and is practised in more than 50 countries around the world.

=== Kudo in Russia ===
In 1991, the first in Russia section of daido-juku karate-do was opened in Vladivostok. The founder of the style, Azuma Takashi, visited Moscow, after which a foreign branch of the Kudo Federation was opened there. On July 7, 1994, the Moscow Federation of Daido Juku Karate-do was registered by the Moscow Justice Department

In May 1994, the Moscow Cup was organized and held in Moscow, the first international Daido Juku tournament in Russia. The first victory of Russian athletes in Japan took place in 1996, Alexey Kononenko took 1st place in his weight category.

In 2004, the Russian Kudo Federation was established. Since 2001, the official championship of Russia in kudo has been held, in the same year Russian athletes won two gold, three silver and two bronze medals. Russian kudo wrestlers headed the refereeing team at the 2nd international tournament "Baltic States Open Cup", which took place in 2003 and brought together athletes from Russia, Japan, the Baltic countries, Azerbaijan, Italy, Germany and Poland.

The 1st Kudo World Cup was held in 2011 in Moscow. On January 13, 2013, Roman Anashkin qualified for 6th dan kudo, becoming the first non-Japanese to receive such a degree.

== Overview ==
The goal of Kūdō is to come as close as possible to realistic, real fighting, with appropriate protective clothing. To achieve this, Kūdō is fought with very few regulations, and has specialised techniques and actions. The techniques of Kūdō include the entire spectrum of a real struggle-fighting standing up, throwing techniques, grappling and ground fighting.

The training of Kūdō consists primarily of kihon, general fitness training and combat. The kata of Kyokushin were eliminated without replacement.

Kūdō is a comprehensive martial art and philosophy, in which both the physical as well as mental development are considered. Traditional Japanese etiquette in budō (as reigi) is followed, there are certain Japanese greeting rituals, a traditional training keikogi is worn, the names of the techniques are in Japanese, etc.

== Dojo kun ==
Dōjō kun is a Japanese martial arts term literally meaning "training hall rules". They are generally posted at the entrance to a dōjō or at the "front" of the dojo (shomen) and outline behaviour expected and disallowed.

The dojo kun of kudo is the following:

Through the pursuit of Kudo,
we develop great physical and mental strength,
educate ourselves and gain intelligence,
and bond with people and enrich our emotions.
Therefore, we shall be able to cultivate our personalities
and become positively contributing members of society.

== Equipment ==
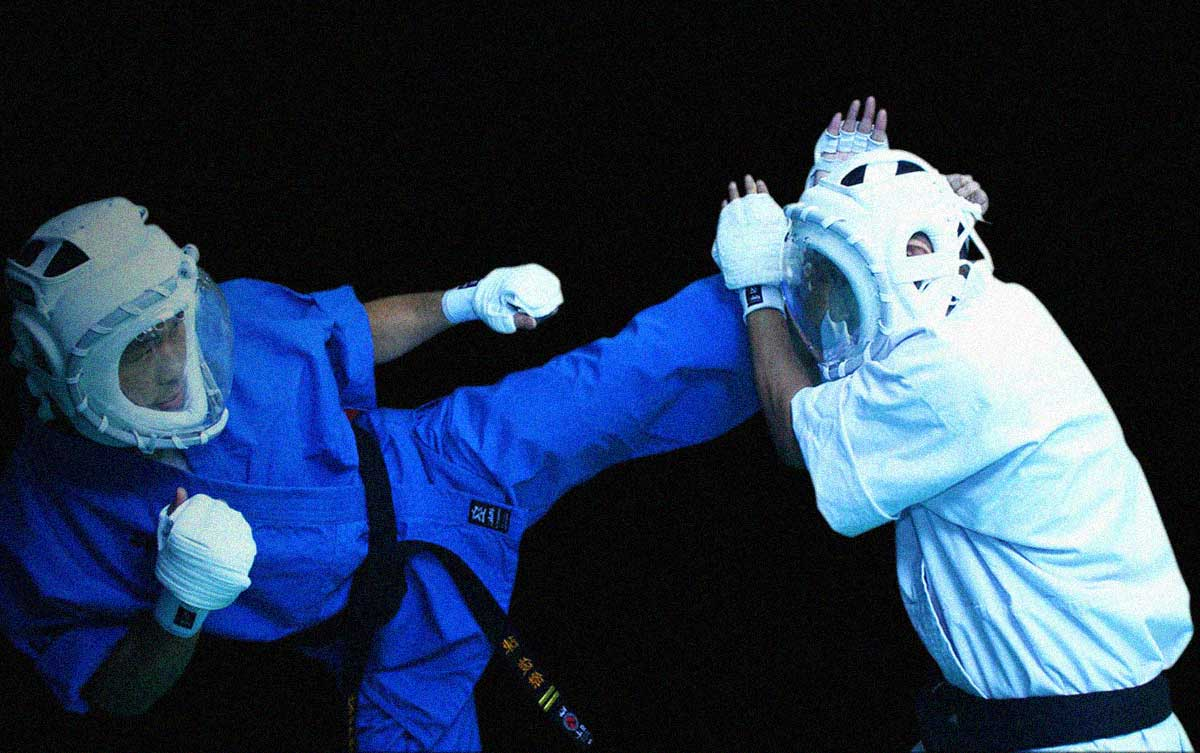
Kudo fighters engaging in combat

Kudo athletes, or kudoka, wear an official uniform, "dogi" or "kudogi" (similar to judo gi, resistant to throwing, but with shorter sleeves than a traditional karate gi). This design is ideal for gripping and throwing techniques. Kudo practitioners use white and blue Gi colors for easy identification.

All athletes must wear dogi, headgear, kudo bandage, a mouthguard, a K.I.F. approved gloves (which protect the knuckles but which leave the fingers free and uncovered to allow grappling) and a special K.I.F. approved Plexiglas visor to protect fighters from severe facial damage and brain trauma.

Underage athletes, in addition to the Kudo Gi, the Plexiglas helmet and the gloves, must wear the shin guards and the bodice. Regulations on the protection of underage athletes may vary from tournament to tournament.

== Combat categories ==
Athletes are not ranked by weight, but by physical index. The physical index (PI) is the sum of weight, in kilograms, plus height, in centimeters.

Category:	under 230
Category:	230–240
Category:	240–250
Category:	250–260
Category:	260–270
Category:	270 and over

This system for identifying categories in which to fight is the only one of its kind. Usually, in other combat sports or other martial arts, the categories in which to fight are classified according to the weight in kilograms. By means of this system of categories, we try to value not only the weight but also the height which, generally, is synonymous with a longer arm and therefore an advantage over long distances

== Regulations ==
There are definitive base rules in Kudo. Although each tournament uses its own rules, they too are rooted in the base rules. Regulation used at Kudo world championships state that: the fight on the ground only twice and respectively no more than thirty seconds, and blows to the back and/or private parts are prohibited.

The competitions are held on a 13x13 meter tatami mat with an internal 9×9 meter square, in which there is the fighting area. On the four corners of the contest area there are 4 referees plus one inside the tatami.

The principle with which points are awarded is based on the strength of moves, since it is a consequence of the technique and of one's physical abilities. Points are to be rewarded not by technique but by effectiveness, based on how much the opponent has felt the blow. The rating is from 1 to 8. The points, in Japanese, are called koka, yuko, wazari and ippon. They are worth 1 point, 2 points, 4 points and 8 points respectively (if the opponent scores 8 points he is awarded the victory).

In addition, victory can occur by submission or choke-out, a knock-out or whichever fighter at the end of the match has scored more points.

In the event of a tie, either a decision is made or another match takes place.

== Famous practitioners ==
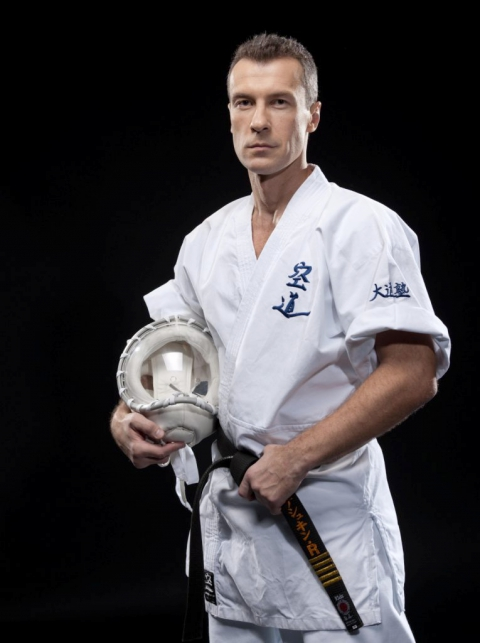
Roman Anashkin, famous Russian Kudoka

- Semmy Schilt, mixed martial artist and kickboxer. Hokutoki champion in 1996 and 1997.
- Roman Anashkin – prestigious Russian martial artist, holds 7 dan black belt in Kudo.
- Yoshinori Nishi, mixed martial arts fighter and founder of the Wajyutsu Keishukai gym. Hokutoki champion in 1984 and 1985.
- Lee Hasdell, mixed martial artist and kickboxer.
- Katsumasa Kuroki, professional wrestler better known as Magnum Tokyo.
- Minoki Ichihara, mixed martial artist and Ultimate Fighting Championship competitor.
- Disha Patani, Indian actress and fitness enthusiast
- Kolyan Edgar - Honored Master of Sports of Russia in Kudo, Candidate for Master of Sports of Russia in Army hand-to-hand fighting, Candidate for Master of Sports of Russia in Combat Sambo, two-time world champion in Kudo (2005, 2009), silver medalist of the World Kudo Championship (2014), bronze medalist of the championship World Kudo (2018), winner of the Kudo World Cup (2011), European Kudo champion (2008), five-time Russian Kudo champion.
- Hisaki Kato, Mixed Martial Artist who competes in Bellator MMA and Kickboxing.
- Akshay Kumar Bollywood super star and martial artist.
- Taapsee Pannu Bollywood actress and martial artist.
- Mehul Vora 5th Dan Black Belt in Kudo & Indian martial arts self promoter and self proclaimed celebrity
- Vladimir Zorin – coach of the Russian national martial arts team Kudo, judge of the international category in eastern martial arts kudo, vice-president of the Russian Kudo Federation, black belt, 6th dan in kudo, author of the book "Fundamentals of Kudo". Together with Roman Anashkin he is one of the progenitors of Kudo in Russia.
- Irina Bykova - World Kudo Champion 2005 in the women's absolute weight category, 18-time Russian Kudo champion, European Kudo champion 2008, holds 4th Dan in Kudo.

== See also ==
- Full contact karate
- Mixed Martial Arts
- Combat Sambo
- Shooto
- Shidokan Karate
- Nippon Kempo
