= Ashihara kaikan =

Style of karate

Ashihara
- Focus: Hybrid
- Country of origin: Japan
- Creator: Hideyuki Ashihara
- Parenthood: Kyokushin Karate, Muay Thai, Jujutsu, Pankration
- Descendant arts: Enshin Kaikan, Tsu Shin Gen
- Official website: ashihara-karate.net

Ashihara kaikan (芦原 会館) is a modern full contact street karate developed from Kyokushin karate by Hideyuki Ashihara with influences from various martial arts including Muay Thai, Pankration, and Jujutsu with an emphasis on Sabaki, using footwork and techniques to turn an opponent's power and momentum against them and to reposition oneself to the opponent's "blind" spot. The style is focused on practical application in a real fight including multiple attackers.

== Instruction guide ==
Kancho Ashihara published his first book in English in 1985 titled Fighting Karate. An instructional video was released in 1985 in English. A second instructional book titled More Fighting Karate was published in 1989. In Japanese, Kancho Ashihara published his first book in 1983 Jissen Ashihara Karate, his second book in 1984 Jissen Ashihara Karate 2 and his third book in 1987 Jissen Ashihara Karate 3. Kancho Ashihara released his first Japanese instructional video in 1984, his second in 1986 and third also in 1986.

The Ashihara Karate International Organisation led by Kaicho Hoosain Narker has also produced several instructional manuals which includes: Student Handbook, Kata Guide, Operations Manual, Administration Manual, Teaching Manual, Preparing for Black Belt & Tournament Preparation Manual Kata Guide, Theory Test Handbook

They have also produced several instructional DVD which includes: Ashihara Karate Sabaki, Ashihara Karate Blue Belt part 1, Ashihara Karate Blue Belt part 2, Ashihara Karate Kata 1

== Uniforms and ranking ==
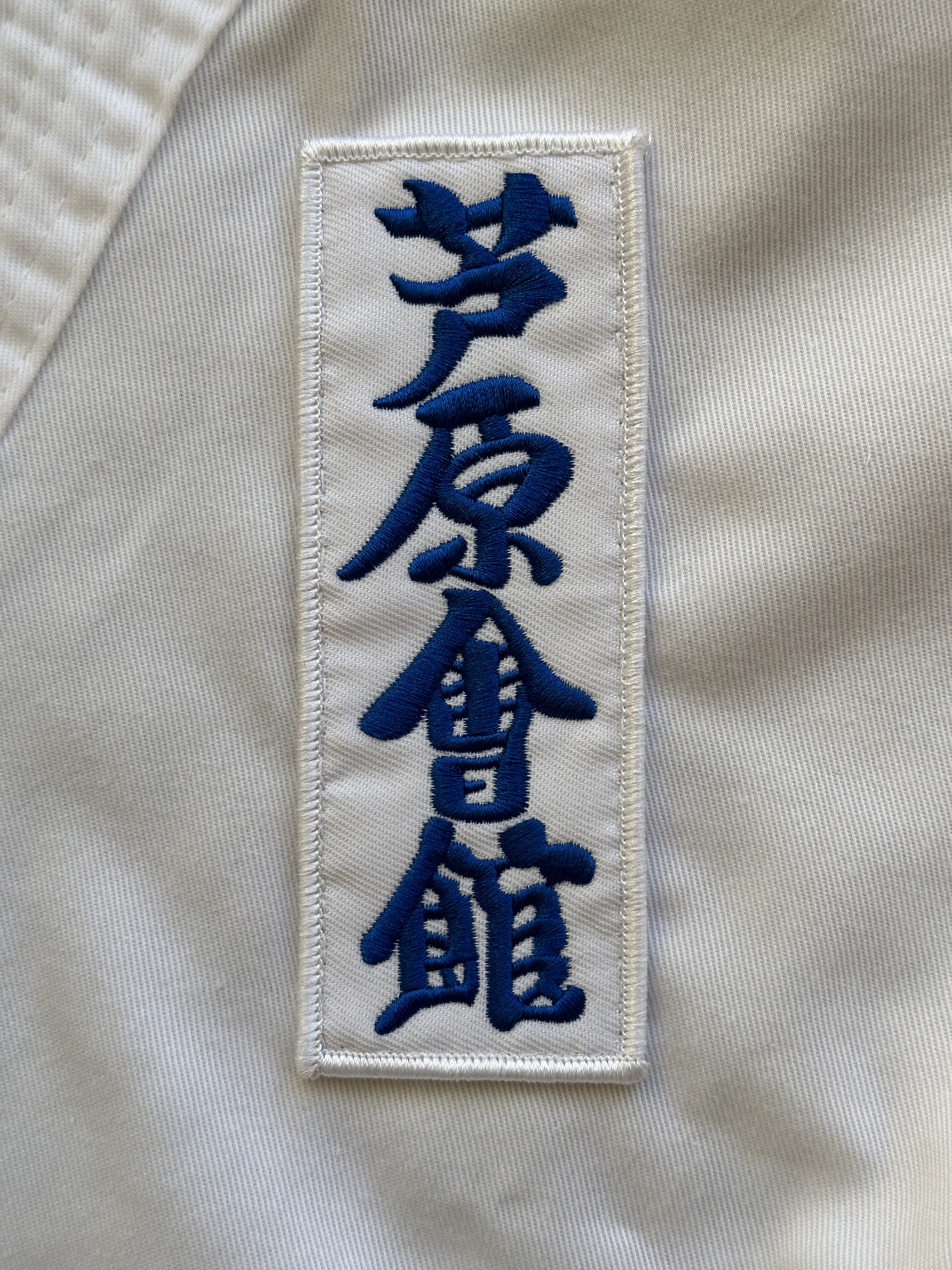
Ashihara Kaikan - kanji embroidery sewn on the top part of the gi (uwagi)

The karate gi was unique at the time as it featured the name of the style on the back of the jacket in English "Ashihara Karate", in addition to the Ashihara in kanji on the front of the jacket, and also on the left sleeve there was an Ashihara logo in colour and in English. The ranking and belt system is the same as Kyokushin.

The Karate Dogi is the outfit worn for karate training. It consists of a jacket (uwagi) and trousers (zubon) made of white cotton or canvas and a belt (obi), the colour of which indicates the rank of the student. The Ashihara school allows one to have badges (crests) on the left side of the chest and on the left sleeve. The belt worn indicates the rank of the karate ka according to the standard ranking system adopted in Ashihara Karate. The ten lower ranks (Mudansha) of Kyu or non-black belt holders are divided into the following colours: white, blue, yellow, green and brown. The upper ten ranks (Yudansha) of Dan have the holders wearing the black belt.

== Tournament ==
Kancho Ashihara did not initially create an annual World Tournament for the style. United States Shihan Joko Ninomiya had been holding an annual tournament in Denver since 1978 in Kyokushin rules which continued after NIKO was formed now in Ashihara rules. This tournament named the Sabaki U.S. Open Karate Challenge became the de facto World Tournament open to all styles with Ashihara rules and attracted international entrants including Japanese. The tournament was held until 1988.

The South African NIKO group held their first variant of the Sabaki Challenge Championships in 1987, followed by the second one in 1988. This was after two South Africans, Hoosain Narker & Brian Ebden competed in the last US Sabaki Challenge Championships organised by Joko Ninomiya shihan. Since then they held several others, but in 1990 started an Invitational International Championships supported by Kancho Ashihara with a foreword written by him in the first and second editions of the tournament. In 1996, this tournament merged with the Sabaki Challenge, by then the group had separated from NIKO and formed the AKI. In 2010, the AKI celebrated their dojo's 30th Anniversary by hosting its 30th Anniversary 1st World Championships in Cape Town, South Africa. In October 2018, they will host their 2nd World Championships in Pune, India.

In 1993, Kancho Ashihara gave permission to the Denmark Branch to organize a World Tournament naming it the Sabaki Challenge Spirit. In 1994, the first annual Sabaki Challenge Spirit was held in Denmark. The tournament was only open to NIKO karateka. No Japanese competitors ever entered preferring to compete in Kyokushin tournaments in Japan. In 2011, the tournament affiliation with NIKO ceased and ever since NIKO has organized their own tournament named the Sabaki World Championship.

Ashihara tournaments are similar to Enshin karate tournaments such as rules - weight divisions, winning by knockout or points, scoring, allowed techniques, one handed grabs and throws.

== Today ==
Ashihara has established branches in Japan and spread throughout the world. Kancho Ashihara died in 1995 at 50 years of age due to illness; before his death, he named his young son Hidenori to be his successor as Kancho of NIKO.

Karate schools derived from NIKO, include Enshin in the United States, Shintaiikudo in Japan, Josui International Karate Organisation in Japan, Ashihara International Karate Organization (AIKO) in Holland, International Ashihara Karate Association (IAKA) in Russia, Ashihara Karate International (AKI) in South Africa, Ashihara World Independent Union (AKWIU) in Holland/Australia, Ashihara BudoKai in Russia and TSG – Ashihara International Karate in Sweden.

Famous karateka include retired Dutch K-1 World Champion and Glory Champion kickboxer Semmy Schilt, Georgian Glory kickboxer Davit Kiria, Danish UFC fighter Nicolas Dalby, Russian UFC fighter Alexander Volkov and Russian Andrey Levandin five time Sabaki Challenge Spirit champion (2005–2010).
