= Enshin kaikan =

Style of full contact karate

Enshin
- Country of origin: United States
- Creator: (Japan) Joko Ninomiya
- Famous practitioners: Michael Ninomiya
- Parenthood: Ashihara Karate, Kyokushin Karate, Judo, Jujutsu
- Official website: enshin.com

Enshin kaikan (円心会館) is a style of "full contact karate", or knockdown karate, founded in 1988 with dojo and students in various countries around the world.

== Overview ==
The core emphasis in Enshin is use of the Sabaki Method, a system of techniques employed with the goal of turning an opponent's power and momentum against him or her and repositioning oneself to the opponent's "blind" spot to counterattack from a more advantageous position. Although Enshin is a "stand-up fighting" style that includes kicks, strikes, and punches found in most other styles of karate, it also utilizes numerous grabs, sweeps, and throws often associated with Judo or other grappling styles of martial arts.

Enshin was founded by Jōkō Ninomiya who directs the Enshin organization from the honbu in Denver, Colorado. The organization is noted for its annual tournament, the Sabaki Challenge, a full-contact, no pads/no gloves, knockdown karate rules competition held annually in Denver and open to advanced martial artists from any style or school.

=== Meaning of name ===
Enshin is derived from two Japanese words or kanji: "en," meaning "open or unfinished circle," and, "shin," meaning "heart" or "inner." "En" relates to the circular movement inherent in the Sabaki Method. However, the circle is "open" or "unfinished" to suggest that studying Enshin and Sabaki is a continuous journey, i.e. a process and not an end that is most important. "Shin" signifies that the Enshin students are not adversaries, but members of a mutually supportive family. "Kaikan" basically means "organization."

== History ==
Joko Ninomiya (二宮城光, Ninomiya Joko) was born on January 27, 1954, in Yawatahama City, Ehime Prefecture, Shikoku, Japan. At age 12 Ninomiya began training in a Judo class taught by a teacher at his junior high school. After turning 14, Ninomiya did extra Judo training at the local police station gym on weekends and holidays. It was there that he met the man who would become his teacher and mentor in karate Hideyuki Ashihara. One year later, in 1969, Ninomiya began training in Ashihara's Kyokushin karate dojo.

When Ninomiya was 17, he was chosen to compete in the 1971 All-Japan Tournament as the youngest competitor. Ninomiya subsequently competed in the 1972, 1973, and 1976 All-Japan Tournaments and the 1975 All-World Tournament, making it to the later rounds in all of them. Ultimately, he won the 1978 All-Japan and then retired from tournament competition.

In 1973 Ninomiya was selected to go train at the Kyokushin dojo in New York City. He stayed on in New York City as an instructor for several years. In 1977 he moved to Denver and opened his own Kyokushin dojo.

In 1980 Hideyuki Ashihara left the Kyokushin organization and started his own style Ashihara Karate. Ninomiya joined Ashihara's organization and directed the US region of Ashihara Karate from Denver. Over the next eight years, Ashihara Karate slowly increased in size in the US and around the world.

During this time, Ninomiya states that he had developed strategies and ideas of his own that he was eager to implement in his training curriculum. He also wanted to develop his own tournament format that would provide what he felt to be a “true” test of karate skills. Therefore, in May, 1988, Ninomiya decided to leave Ashihara Karate and start his own style. Most of the instructors and students of Ashihara in the US decided to follow Ninomiya into his new organization, providing a strong base for the new style Enshin Karate.

Since 1988, Enshin Karate has continued to be headquartered at Ninomiya's honbu in Denver. The organization has grown and now includes schools in Asia, South America, Europe, Africa, Australia, and the Middle East, as well as in the US. Ninomiya's idea for an open, knockdown-rules tournament that promotes the Sabaki method became the Sabaki Challenge that has been held annually in Denver since 1989.

== Technique ==
The techniques or kihon of Enshin include many of the same or similar kicks, punches, strikes, blocks, and parries found in most other karate styles. However, in contrast to many other karate styles, Enshin also includes sweeps, grabs, throws, and takedowns most often found in judo, Jujutsu, and other grappling styles. The core emphasis in applying all of these techniques is through the Sabaki Method.

Perhaps due to Ninomiya's background in Kyokushin, most, if not all, of the Kyokushin striking techniques are found in Enshin. The kicks include front kick, knee kick, roundhouse kick, axe kick, side kick, back kick, and spinning back hook kick. Groin and front-knee-joint kicks are taught for self-defense purposes, but, for safety reasons, aren't used in sparring (kumite) or tournament competition. The arm and hand strikes include forefist straight punch, hook punch, forefist underpunch, knifehand strike (the classic “karate chop”), and elbow strikes. These strikes can be delivered in a variety of ways. For example, a roundhouse kick can be directed at the lower, middle, or upper areas of the opponent's body.

The arms and legs are also used for various blocks and parries. These include the upper block, middle outside parry, lower parry, shin block, and foot stop.

Several throws, sweeps, and grabs are taught and often employed in combination with each other. The grabs are either with one or two hands to the opponent's head, neck, shoulder, arm, or leg. The throws include forward-rolling throw, front throw, back throw, and over-the-shoulder throw. The sweeps include foot sweep, inside thigh kick, and back-of-knee-joint kick.

Many of the principles of the Sabaki method were developed by Ashihara. The Sabaki method aims to employ all of these strikes, block, parries, grabs, sweeps, throws, and takedowns in a way that puts the opponent on the ground as quickly and efficiently as possible. Once on the ground, the opponent is “finished-off” or knocked-out with a strike to a vulnerable part of the body such as the neck or head (finish-off moves are simulated in Enshin training or tournament competition). Sabaki strategy combines rhythm, timing, position, and distance to parry and counterattack in one continuous motion. The ability to turn defense into offense by using an opponent's power and momentum against him lies at the heart of the Sabaki method.

The basic technique in the Sabaki method is to parry the opponent's attack in a way that redirects their attacking energy away from you. You then move to your opponent's weak side or blind spot that has been opened-up by your parry and execute a strike, throw, sweep, or combination of these to put the opponent on the ground. The combination of movements involve circular or pendulum motions of the body in order to redirect the opponent's attack without meeting it head-on (meeting force with force) and to counterattack with motions that generate energy and momentum. Many of the parries and sweeps are designed to put the opponent off-balance which makes it much easier to knock them to the ground as their own body and momentum assist in carrying him/her to the ground or floor.

== Sabaki Challenge ==
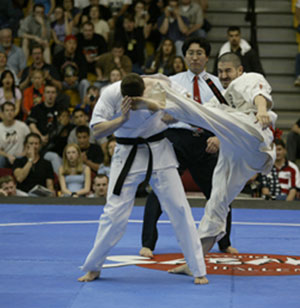
Michael Ninomiya competing in the Sabaki Challenge

Since 1989 Enshin Karate has held the Sabaki Challenge (officially called the Sabaki Challenge, World Open Tournament and often unofficially called the World Sabaki Challenge) in Denver, Colorado. The Sabaki Challenge is a full-contact single elimination tournament intended to fulfill Ninomiya's vision of a showcase of a "true," stand-up martial arts skills competition. The tournament is open to advanced male and female competitors of any style. The tournament competitors are divided into (male) lightweight, middleweight, heavyweight, and female divisions.

The rules of the Sabaki Challenge favor and promote use of the sabaki method including use of grabs (one handed), sweeps and throws, in addition to kicks, punches, and other strikes. A competitor is able to win by knockout of their opponent or by points scored against their opponent. 1 point is awarded for a sweep or takedown. 3 points are awarded for a sweep or takedown followed by a quick simulated strike to the opponent such as a punch. Hand and elbow strikes to the head and neck aren't permitted, but kicks are. Grabs are permitted to one side of the opponent's body for three seconds at a time. Since it is a full-contact tournament, knock-outs do sometimes occur.

In addition to the annual Sabaki Challenge in Denver, schools in the US also hold Regional Sabaki tournaments for karateka to compete in full contact tournaments to gain experience and for finalists to apply to compete in the World Sabaki Challenge. An annual Sabaki Challenge is held in Japan called the All Japan Sabaki Challenge tournament. Japan finalists can apply to compete in the World Sabaki Challenge. There are also Regional Sabaki tournaments held in Japan. An annual Sabaki challenge is held in a European country called the International European Sabaki Challenge with finalists able to apply to compete in the World Sabaki Challenge.
