= Full contact karate =

Competition format of karate

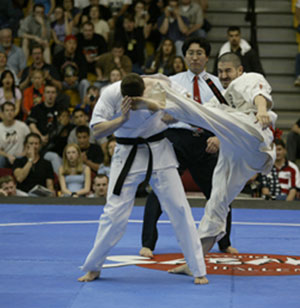
- Focus: Striking
- Country of origin: Japan
- Creator: Varies depending on subtype.
- Famous practitioners: American Rules: Joe Lewis, Bill Wallace, Benny "The Jet" Urquidez, Don Wilson, Olivier Gruner, Branko Cikatić, Michael Kuhr, Troy Dorsey; Knockdown: Terutomo Yamazaki, Akira Masuda, Hajime Kazumi, Francisco Filho, Andy Hug
- Parenthood: Varies depending on subtype.
- Olympic sport: No

Full contact karate is any format of karate where competitors spar (also called "Kumite") full-contact and allow a knockout as winning criterion.

== History ==
Full contact karate competition comes in several different formats developed for the art of karate at different times in different places. Some developed independently, others developed out of other full contact rule systems or from light contact rule systems.

There are no major unifying organizations in any of the different formats, and the rule details may change drastically between the many rival sport/style organizations and different promoters. Some organizations stick rigidly to one set of rules. Other use several rule formats harmoniously side by side. Some even have tournaments that switch rule formats between rounds of the same bout. Sometimes the differences between the different rules are large, and sometimes the only significant differences between different sport rules are the organizational structures that use them.

== Different formats ==
=== Knockdown ===
One major format of full-contact sport karate is known as knockdown karate or sometimes Japanese full contact karate. This style of sport fighting was developed and pioneered in the late 1960s by the Kyokushin karate organization in Japan, founded by Korean-Japanese Masutatsu Oyama (大山倍達, Ōyama Masutatsu). In fighting the competitors traditionally wear no gloves, padding or body protection other than groin guards (although local regulations sometimes enforce exceptions to this tradition), but it is bare knuckle fighting. Grabbing and holding the opponent, including clinching, is not allowed under the basic- knockdown karate rules as used in Kyokushin, but are occasionally allowed in some variations used in other styles.

Points are scored by knocking the opponent out, down to the floor, by sweep and controlled follow up for half a point, or by otherwise visibly incapacitating them. Unless there is a knockdown or sweep, the bout is continuous, with stoppages only to break up locked clinches or if the fighters leave the fight area. Unlike American full-contact karate, or point karate, clean hits are not counted in and by themselves, as the scoring depends entirely on the effect of the hits, not on the formal or stylistic appearance of the techniques. No matter the perfection in execution of a technique, it will not score unless it visibly affects the opponent. In the same manner, if a technique does show a visible effect, it does not matter if it is executed in a manner regarded as inferior.

Common, minor variations to the basic-knockdown rules include Ashihara Karate and Enshin Karate knockdown rules that allow one-handed grabbing in order to execute throws to score points. Many other variations exist, some so extensive that they can no longer be classified as knockdown rules, and several other branches of full-contact karate (typically included in the "gloved", "MMA inspired" and "others" groups) originate as such a variation of the Knockdown karate rules.

Although this sport format originated with the Kyokushin karate organization, it has spread until now and it's used by many karate styles and organizations. Karate styles embracing these rules are often called knockdown karate styles, and these include both organizations that originated from Kyokushin, such as Shidōkan Karate, Ashihara Karate, Enshin Karate, Shindenkai and Seidokaikan (the style that originated the K-1), as well as styles that originated independently from Kyokushin such as Ryukyukan from Okinawa and Muso-Kai karate. (Muso-Kai started with Shorin Ryu, Knockdown styles were a huge influence later)

Though severely divided by rivaling styles and organizations (several of which use their own minor variations of the basic rules), and lacking a unifying sport organization, the sport of knockdown karate today is common all over the world. Despite the lack of a unifying sport organization to hold unifying championships (and the friction between the different styles and organizations), there is a long tradition in most knockdown karate organizations to hold special open-tournament knockdown karate events, where fighters from any knockdown karate (or any other) style and organization are welcome to participate.

=== American ===
A second full contact karate competition format is American full contact karate which was developed in the US by the Professional Karate Association during early 70s by borrowing rules, settings and gloves from western boxing, and adapting it. It is continuous fighting, where the bout is not broken for scoring, but point scores are summed up at the end of the bout. Protective equipment used is boxing gloves and often foot-pads, shin pads, and amateur boxing helmets.

It had its origin when Joe Lewis, a traditional Shorin Ryu black belt, was disappointed with scoring in point karate and wanted to prove that traditional martial artists could fight to a knockout. For his role in promoting and organizing the first full contact bout, Joe Lewis is considered the father of American full contact karate and full contact kickboxing, both important predecessor to modern-day mixed martial arts fighting.

American full contact karate is closely related to American kickboxing, and it is often difficult to separate the two sports. As a guideline, both do not allow kicks below the waistline, or the use of knees or elbows.

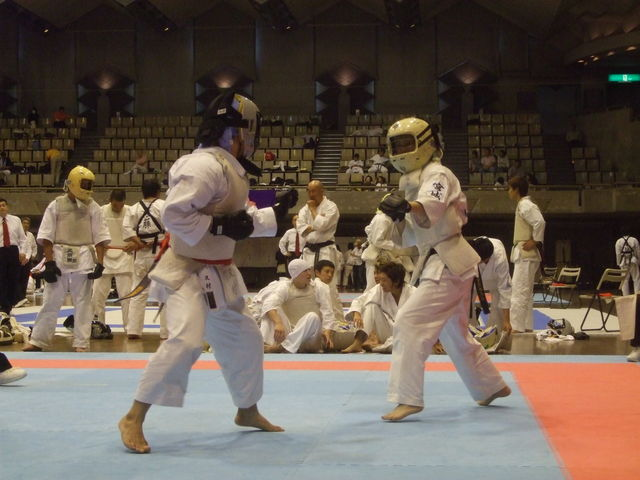
Bōgutsuki - a form of full-contact karate fought with armour

=== Gloved ===
One more recent system of full contact karate that has gained in popularity is Gloved karate or Glove karate. Sometimes called Shin-karate/Shinkarate (or "new" karate, in a partial translation) depending on sport organization and promoter -with the largest sport organizations being Shinkaratedo renmei and All Japan Glove Karate Federation This system originates in Japan where it has become a popular amateur sport for karate fighters wishing to enter professional kickboxing. Outside Japan it has gained some momentum in Europe, but is still very small compared to other forms of karate.

The rules are based on the knockdown karate rules explained above, but modified to use boxing gloves and allow punches to the face, although it may be argued that it is unclear where this karate competition format ends and kickboxing begins. This is especially true since many gloved karate fighters seamlessly go on from their amateur gloved karate career to professional kickboxing careers. Many Japanese gloved karate fighters have in recent years become well known as pro-kickboxers, and many of the most successful Japanese kickboxers in K-1, such as Kozo Takeda, Yoshihiro Sato, Yasuhiro Kido, Hinata, Yuya Yamamoto, originated in gloved karate.

=== Bogu Kumite ===
Still another form of full contact karate is Bogu kumite, which is most often associated with a few traditional Okinawan styles of karate like Chito-ryu, Isshin-ryu, Shorinji-ryu and Nippon Kempo. This format of continuous competition uses heavy protective padding to avoid injuries. In the beginning, this protective padding was based on the helmet and armor of Japanese kendo with gloves to protect the knuckles from the helmet's steel bars, although in modern days more specific padding has been developed. While allowing knockout as winning criterion, the protective equipment reduces the chances for it, and points are usually scored for clean techniques and techniques knocking the opponent off his feet. Nippon Kempo also allows grappling.

Nevertheless, compared to most other major full contact karate sports, Bogu Kumite is still very small.

=== Full contact point karate ===
One format of full contact karate competition is full contact point karate. It is similar to non full contact competition karate; the only difference from light contact and semi contact karate bouts is that if the opponent is knocked out, it is a win instead of a disqualification for excessive contact. Points are scored for clean hits to the specified target zones, and unless there is an evident knockout or knockdown, the referee breaks the bout after each exchange to score the hits. The blows are delivered with full contact, although gloves, foot-pads, and in some cases body padding, are worn. This form of full contact karate competition is mainly found in North America, where it originated, although it has a minor following in Europe. It is also similar to the competition format used in full contact Shotokan, Taekwondo, and the sport karate competitions using this format often blur the line between these two related arts.

=== Karate Combat ===
In 2018, a new professional league was launched with a new full contact rule set, called Karate Combat. The rules were developed by Hungarian karateka Adam Kovacs and allow full contact, with gloves, knockouts, and no grappling. Fighters who have joined the league include Rafael Aghayev of Azerbaijan, Davy Dona of France, Josh Quayhagen of Lake Charles, LA, and Achraf Ouchen of Morocco. Bas Rutten, the UFC Hall of Famer and actor on CBS's Kevin Can Wait, is part of the organization and has served as commentator for events in Budapest, Miami, Athens, Hollywood and New York City. The New York City event was held at the top of One World Trade, the first sporting event ever held there. UFC star Chuck Liddell has acted as an ambassador for the league.

The rules of this contest is punches, kicks to the calf (not thigh) and to the head and body, as well as knee strikes. If a fighter gets knocked down the opponent can punch them on the ground for 5 seconds before the referee stops the fight or stand them back up.

In December 2019, the league announced an extended schedule of fight events for the year around the world with an event in Kyoto, Japan, planned for the Spring. The Kyoto fight was cancelled and the promotion held two events that year, one in Orlando, Florida and one in Hollywood with guest announcer Danny Trejo. In April 2020, the league announced a new plan that would hold all of a season's fights in one location and use CGI to add the exotic atmosphere; the plan was partially in response to the COVID-19 pandemic.

=== Hybrid fighting karate ===
Hybrid fighting karate is a form of full contact karate allows the use of both striking (Karate) and grappling (Judo / Jujutsu) techniques, both standing and on the ground.

In 1981, Grandmaster Takashi Azuma created "Karatedo Daido Juku" in Sendai city, Miyagi prefecture. Daido Juku introduced "Kakuto Karate (Combat Karate)" a safe, practical and popular form of tournament karate using the face protector and allowing attacks to the head level attack, throws and grabs. Since then joint locks and chokes were included. Ever since, Daido Juku became a leading organization in the mixed martial arts boom in Japan. Daido Juku competition format, Kudo, allows any strike (including headbutts and groin kicks), throws and limited time grappling on the ground.

Other groups combining traditional karate striking with grappling are Zendokai Karate with their "Vale Tudo Karate" and Kyokushin Budokai with their "all-round fighting" rules, as well as a multitude of lesser known minor rule systems. Another hybrid karate style is Seireikai Karate, founded by a Kyokushin and Oyama Karate practitioner. The style is primarily Kyokushin and Oyama Karate striking techniques, combined with the throws and grappling of Judo. The characteristics of this modified kyokushin fighting style relies on punch counters, multi-range kicking, throws and take-downs, and joint locks. Another hybrid Full Contact Karate form is Ashigaru-Ryu founded by Sensei Bob Peppels in the Netherlands.

=== Others ===
Other sport rules, including versions allowing full contact bare knuckle strikes to the unprotected head, exists, but tend to be small and obscure compared to the above listed major formats. These rules tend to be restricted to a single small style organization or even individual sport event promotions.

Examples of minor full contact rules system are the Irikumi Go as used by some Gōjū-ryū organizations (most notably the International Okinawan Gōjū-ryū Karate-dō Federation and the Jundokan Goju-Ryu organization), and the rules of Mumonkai Karate. Kyokushinkan shinken shobu uses a variation of knockdown karate using thin gloves, and allows headpunches, clinching and throws. Irikumi Go is a traditional continuous fighting using full contact, gloves and face-punches, used in Gojuryu karate. Mumonkai use rules similar to knockdown karate, but modified to allow head-punches with protective headgear and thin gloves.

In France, a full contact karate promotion called pro fight karate, has been formed for professional karate with MMA style gloves, clinching and limited grappling.

An example of full contact karate rules unique to a single promotion is the now defunct Chaos Madmax special event in Japan, arranged by the FSA Kenshinkan style organization. Here fighters fight without gloves or protective equipment, and head-punches allowed. Chaos Madmax has been replaced by Pro KarateDo, an organization using similar bareknuckle rules.

The Shotokan Karate-Do International Association (SKDIA) run events called FullContact Shotokan. The competitors wear protective equipment and fight under the full contact ruleset. Punches, kicks, knees, throws and sweeps are all allowed, with a 5 second rule for attacks on a grounded opponent. Rumours say these rules influenced the idea of the first Karate Combat ruleset.

== See also ==
- List of martial arts
- 100-man kumite
