= Kyokushin World Cup in Weight Categories =

World Karate Championship in Weight Categories is the second largest competition in Kyokushin Karate. This tournament is arranged by several kyokushin organisations and usually held every fourth year in between World Tournaments which do not have any weight classes.

== Rules ==
All world cup tournaments operates under knockdown karate rules which involves standup bareknuckle fighting with basically no protection. The more characteristical rules in knockdown karate compered to other styles is that you are not allowed to punch in the face and a point system that only count hits that actually "hurt" the opponent. This makes knockdown fighting very physical but at the same time quite safe considering that there are very few hits to the head. There can be slight variances in the rules between the different organizations responsible for a tournaments but the basics are the same. The rules has also been modified over the years.

=== Normally knockdown rules includes ===
- No protectors or guards are used, with exception to groin guards and teeth protection.
- 3 minutes match-time
- The fighter that achieves an Ippon (one point) will win the match and the fight is stopped. An Ippon is achieved when an attack that knocks down the opponent for more than 3 seconds or renders the opponent being reluctant to continue the fight. An ippon can also be granted if an illegal technique is used and the other fighter is disqualified.
- A fighter can also win the fight by Waza-ari (half point) which is awarded if the opponent is knocks down by less than 3 seconds and is able to continue the fight. If two Waza-aris is achieved during the fight it is counted as an Ippon and the fight is stopped.
- If no knockdowns occurs, the judges can declare one fighter as winner by overall efficiency of techniques, force and dynamics.
- In case of a draw there can be up to 3 extensions (each 2 minutes long). Some tournaments will also settled draws by weight different and result of Tamaeshiwari (breaking of tiles)

=== Illegal techniques are ===
- Punches to the face
- Kicks to the groin
- Grappling, grabbing of any form
- Headbutts
- Kick to knee
- Kick to rear of head
- Pushing
- Strike to spine from rear
- Elbow to face

Read more about various full contact karate rules

== Before split of IKO ==
Only world tournaments in open weight was organized by IKO (International Karate Organization Kyokushinkaikan) led by Sosai Masutatsu Oyama. After the death of Sosai, IKO was split in different fractions and several has since then started to organise world tournaments in weight categories from 1997 and onwards.

== All Japan Weight Category Tournament ==
IKO All Japan Weight Category Karate Championships is the annual Kyokushin Karate Japan Championship. It has been held in Osaka since 1984 and is held in four different weight classes. Exceptionally, the 2014 tournament was held in Tokyo. Earlier in 1969, the Japanese Championships were established, in which the championship is played in the open weight class. Between 1984 and 1996, there were three weight classes: light, medium and heavy. After the first World Weight Championships in 1997, the weight classes were increased by one.

=== Super Heavyweight (+85 kg) ===
Year	Gold	Silver	Bronze
1998	Kiyoyuki Shida	Yasuhiko Kimura	Gun Irisawa
1999	Kiyoyuki Shida	Tadateru Sano	Gun Irisawa
2000	Hirokazu Kondo	Hideki Tokumoto	Satoshi Higuchi
2001	Atsushi Kadoi	Shinji Adachi	Tsuneya Ichikawa
2002	Letši Kurbanov	Hideki Tokumoto	Hirokazu Kondo
2003	Hirokazu Kondo	Norihito Satoh	Shinji Adachi
2004	Jan Soukup	Andrei Stepin	Oleg Lukyanenko
2005	Mihail Kozlov	Keiji Higuchi	Yoshiaki Uchida
2006	Darmen Sadvokasov	Makoto Akaishi	Arthur Hovhannisyan
2007	Makoto Taniguchi	Makoto Akaishi	Yuji Kogure
2008	Makoto Akaishi	Zahari Damyanov	Kentaro Aso
2009	Tadakuni Tokuda	Hideo Sawada	Tadateru Sano
2010	Syoki Arata	Makoto Taniguchi	Hideo Sawada
2011	Makoto Taniguchi	Seijyun Kinoshita	Norio Matsumura
2012	Syoki Arata	Sergei Uvitski	Satoru Araki
2013	Oleksandr Ieromienko	Kirill Kotšnev	Masahiro Ohe
2014	Shōhei Kamada	Mikio Ueda	Steven Cujic
2015	Steven Cujic	Satoru Araki	Kenta Nanbara
2016	Shōhei Kamada	Yuta Takahashi	Tatsuma Yamagawa
2017	Goderzi Kapanadze	Oleksandr Ieromenko	Seiya Tanigawa
2018	Anton Gulyaev	Kenta Nanbara	Ryunosuke Hoshi
2019	Goderzi Kapanadze	Anton Gulyaev	Danil Goryushkin

=== Heavyweight (-85 kg) ===
Year	Gold	Silver	Bronze
1984	Yasuhiro Shichinohe	Yoshitaka Nishiyama	Shinichi Sotodate
1985	Yasuhiro Shichinohe	Yoshitaka Nishiyama	Hirofumi Kanayama
1986	Yoshitaka Nishiyama	Hirofumi Kanayama	Katsutoshi Iguchi
1987	Yasuhiro Shichinohe	Hiroki Kurosawa	Masashi Kimoto
1988	Masashi Kimoto	Takehisa Iriki	Hirofumi Kanayama
1989	Yasuhiro Shichinohe	Yoshihiro Tamura	Iwao Takita
1990	Tatsuya Iwasaki	Iwao Takita	Yoshiharu Eguchi
1991	Yoshihiro Tamura	Yasuhiro Shichinohe	Yutaka Ishi
1992	Yoshihiro Tamura	Takehiro Minami	Kiyoshi Nemoto
1993	Kenji Yamaki	Kunihiro Suzuki	Hiroki Kurosawa
1994	Niiho Satoshi	Kunihiro Suzuki	Nicholas Pettas
1995	Tatsuya Iwasaki	Yoshihiro Tamura	Hiroki Kurosawa
1996	Masayoshi Takaku	Kiiyoyuki Shida	Yasuhiko Kimura
1997	Kyokushin World Championships held simultaneously		
1998	Atsushi Kadoi	Naoji Mikoshiba	Keiichi Hayashi
1999	Shinji Adachi	Osamu Sumitani	Kentaro Tanaka
2000	Kentaro Tanaka	Osamu Sumitani	Tetsuya Kano
2001	Yoshinori Ikeda	Masashi Nakagawa	Fumihiro Sugiyama
2002	Naoji Mikoshiba	Masashi Nakagawa	Osamu Sumitani
2003	Masato Ikeda	Yoshinori Ikeda	Masataka Ino
2004	Kenshin Morimura	Yuji Kogure	Masataka Ino
2005	Hiroyuki Kidachi	Yasushi Itatani	Yoshitatsu Beppu
2006	Osamu Sumitani	Toshihiro Kanamori	Yoshitatsu Beppu
2007	Osamu Shiojima	Kengo Shimizu	Naoki Ichimura
2008	Yoshitatsu Beppu	Nurmamed Mamedov	Yoshikazu Muraoka
2009	Yoshitatsu Beppu	Osamu Sumitani	Kyohei Yasujima
2010	Tariel Nikoleishvili	Zenjyuro Mori	Yoshikazu Muraoka
2011	Kyohei Ajima	Yoshikazu Muraoka	Yoshitatsu Beppu
2012	Daiki Kobayashi	Shōhei Kamada	Tatsuya Murata
2013	Mikio Ueda	Koinosuke Ishizaki	Kyohei Ajima
2014	Yuta Takahashi	Masanaga Nakamura	Farukh Turgunboev
2015	Masanaga Nakamura	Takuya Takeoka	Yota Higuchi
2016	Koinosuke Ishizaki	Takuya Takeoka	Chihiro Nakajima
2017	Chihiro Nakajima	Yutaro Ishizuka	Kyohei Ajima
2018	Andrei Luzin	Kyohei Ajima	Kashin Osawa
2019	Kashin Osawa	Andrei Tširkov	Youta Takahashi

=== Middleweight (-75 kg) ===
Year	Gold	Silver	Bronze
1984	Hideaki Kakinuma	Mitsuaki Satoh	Satoshi Yui
1985	Takehisa Iriki	Hidehiko Hashizume	Jyun Miwa
1986	Hidehiko Hashizume	Hideki Okamoto	Makoto Kusakai
1987	Yasuhiro Kuwajima	Hidehiko Hashizume	Masahiro Oga
1988	Hideki Shibata	Masahiro Oga	Takuya Akimoto
1989	Hiroyuki Miake	Niiho Satoshi	Masaaki Yoshii
1990	Kyouichi Taguchi	Shinegori Sakamoto	Toshiya Sasaki
1991	Naoyuki Sonoda	Takhiroh Katoh	Eiji Kawamoto
1992	Eiji Kawamoto	Hidenori Aoki	Shinichi Ogawa
1993	Hidenori Aoki	Toshiaki Iizumi	Masanori Ngatomo
1994	Hiroyuki Miake	Yoshinori Ikeda	Yoshikazu Koi
1995	Tetsuo Seto	Masato Ikeda	Garry O'Neill
1996	Ryū Narushima	Atsuya Fukuda	Hiroyuki Kidachi
1997	Kyokushin World Championships held the same year		
1998	Yuji Arai	Khosro Yaghoubi	Tadashi Honma
1999	Hiroyuki Kidachi	Shin Ito	Masahiro Kaneko
2000	Hiroyuki Kidachi	Khosro Yaghoubi	Yoshinori Ikeda
2001	Yuji Shin	Tatsuya Fukuda	Tadashi Honma
2002	Shin Ito	Hisashi Noka	Toshihiro Kanamori
2003	Toshihiro Kanamori	Hisashi Noka	Joji Hibino
2004	Takamitsu Sakurai	Makoto Ikemoto	Adlan Abzotov
2005	Tomohiko Matsuoka	Zenjyuro Mori	Atsutomo Mori
2006	Zenjyuro Mori	Tomohiko Matsuoka	Dmitri Startsev
2007	Yuzo Suzuki	Yuto Watanabe	Zenjyuro Mori
2008	Yuzo Suzuki	Tomohiko Matsuoka	Takaichi Onuma
2009	Yuta Mita	Yuichi Sugimura	Masaru Shitanda
2010	Yuta Takahashi	Yuki Fukui	Tomohiko Matsuoka
2011	Takuya Takeoka	Takaichi Onuma	Yuki Inaoka
2012	Zenjyuro Mori	Yuta Sawamura	Yuta Takahashi
2013	Masanaga Nakamura	Takuya Takeoka	Yuta Takahashi
2014	Igor Titkov	Takehiro Kaga	Andrei Luzin
2015	Yuta Sawamura	Yukou Harada	Kasin Osawa
2016	Takuma Yamada	Kashin Osawa	Chiharu Higuchi
2017	Takuya Takeoka	Chiharu Higuchi	Takuya Yagihashi
2018	Chiharu Higuchi	Yuki Yoza	Yuki Usuda
2019	Takehiro Kaga	Yuki Shimizu	Kazutaka Watari

=== Lightweight (-65 kg) ===
Year	Gold	Silver	Bronze
1984	Masahiro Oga	Tatsumi Nakae	Haruo Nakijima
1985	Kenji Midori	Hiroyuki Miake	Yoshikuni Toyoda
1986	Takahiro Kajiwara	Masahiro Sakurazawa	Toshhiko Imanishi
1987	Kenji Midori	Hiroyuki Miake	Hisayoshi Tsuda
1988	Takahiro Kajiwara	Taichi Nishimura	Toshhiko Imanishi
1989	Seiji Yamame	Toshhiko Imanishi	Hisayoshi Tsuda
1990	Kenji Midori	Kensaku Yamamoto	Ken Kato
1991	Kensaku Yamamoto	Masanori Nagatomo	Naoki Kuniyoshi
1992	Kensaku Yamamoto	Kohtara Arinaga	Kou Tanigawa
1993	Kensaku Yamamoto	Seiji Yamane	Katae Minoru
1994	Kou Tanigawa	Ryū Narushima	Kohtara Arinaga
1995	Ryū Narushima	Takeshi Fukuda	Nobuyuki Kamio
1996	Masafumi Tagahara	Nobuyuki Kamio	Hiromitsu Takano
1997	World Kyokushin Championships the same year		
1998	Hiroyuki Kidachi	Koji Yasuda	Masafumi Tagahara
1999	Ryū Narushima	Koji Yasuda	Masafumi Tagahara
2000	Masafumi Tagahara	Makoto Ozaki	Hisashi Noki
2001	Yuuki Fukui	Shiro Yaginuma	Koji Yasuda
2002	Osamu Shiojima	Ryo Ozaki	Tomohiko Matsuoka
2003	Osamu Shiojima	Atsushi Ono	Takahiro Fukuda
2004	Yuuki Fukui	Tomohiko Matsuoka	Makoto Ozaki
2005	Makoto Ozaki	Atsushi Ono	Shintarou Koyama
2006	Yuzo Suzuki	Makoto Ozaki	Kunitomo Kondou
2007	Yuuki Fukui	Yuya Fujita	Makoto Ozaki
2008	Roman Semtšenko	Nikolai Krush	Yuta Mita
2009	Yuzo Suzuki	Tomohiko Matsuoka	Takaichi Onuma
2010	Yuya Fujita	Yuta Sawamura	Masato Osugi
2011	Yuta Sawamura	Kazumasa Aizawa	Yuko Harada
2012	Takaichi Onuma	Naoya Kimura	Aleksandr Mihailov
2013	Yukou Harada	Yoshimasa Tokushige	Hiroisa Nishino
2014	Genki Kamei	Yuki Shimizu	Yuya Konishi
2015	Yuki Shimizu	Takaichi Onuma	Yuki Yoza
2016	Yuki Yoza	Yuki Fukui	Yuki Shimizu
2017	Kazutaka Watari	BeyNoah	Alexander Aristov
2018	BeyNoah	Alim Junusov	Jevgeni Gluhov
2019	Alexander Aristov	Alim Junusov	Kento Kobayashi

== U.S. Weight Category Karate Championships (USWC) ==
The Kyokushin U.S. Weight Category Karate Championships (USWC) is the annual Kyokushin Karate U.S. Championship. It has been held in Los Angeles since 2005 and is held in four different weight classes. Previously, the All American Open was held in 1996, where the championship is played in the open weight class. In the first year, there were three weight classes.

=== Super Heavyweight (+90 kg) ===
Year	Gold	Silver	Bronze
2006	Marek Kosowski	Michael Martinez	Slawomir Was
2007	Slawomir Was	Luis Giralt	Daymon Miller
2008	Slawek Was	Petar Martinov	Hristo Hristov
2009	Marcin Sieradzki	Petar Martinov	Yordan Yanev
2010	Marcin Sieradzki	Mark Berg	Joe Nguyen
2011	Arkadiusz Szir	Daniel Milicevic	Kris Erickson
2012	Daniel Milicevic	Mark Berg	Seiichiro Fujimoto
2013	Daniel Milicevic	Matth Payne	Mark Berg
2014	Daniel Milicevic	Patryk Sypien	Mark Berg
2015	Mark Berg	Damian Kolano	Lucas McKinnon
2016	Taiga Yanagisawa	Ryan Powell	Seiichiro Fujimoto
2017	Goderzi Kapanadze	Daniel Milicevic	Taiga Yanagisawa
2018	Miguel Rodriguez	Taiga Yanagisawa	Stanimir Kondov
2019	Taiga Yanagisawa	Stanimir Kondov	
2020	Stanimir Kondov	Woo Cheol Roh	

=== Heavyweight (-90 kg) ===
Year	Gold	Silver	Bronze
2005	Luis Giralt	Slawomir Was	Stephane Parent
2006	Johnny LeBlanc	Katsuhiko Nakakuki	Steven Cujic
2007	Zahari Damjanov	Shohei Yamamoto	Carlos Castro
2008	Masaru Sato	Zensaku Munn	Victor Potvin
2009	Shohei Yamamoto	Jordan Forget	Kiril Boev
2010	Shohei Yamamoto	Maxime Demeautis	Jordan Forget
2011	Nicolae Stoian	Krzysztof Galka	Pasha Mykhaylov
2012	Darmen Sadvokasov	Nicolae Stoian	Marek Mroz
2013	Mohamed Chikh	Evgenii Savin	Nicolae Stoian
2014	Tornike Kurtsikidze	Anthony Tockar	Damian Kolano
2015	Mohamed Chikh	Pasha Mykhaylov	Marek Mroz
2016	David Navojan	Jahnmaine Christie	Stanimir Kondov
2017	Sota Nakano	Achemi Chikh	Brett Burris
2018	Chihiro Nakajima	Sota Nakano	Robin Hussey
2019	Igor Lyashenko	Sota Nakano	Yuji Ishikawa
2020	Yuji Ishikawa	Johnerick Sanchez	Mohammad Saleh

=== Middleweight (-80 kg) ===
Year	Gold	Silver	Bronze
2005	Katsuhiko Nakakuki	Seiji Hori	Michihiro Nagase
2006	Masahiro Ito	Seiji Hori	Michihiro Nagase
2007	Damian Kolano	Tomasz Pelczar	Arnold Koh
2008	Stilian Petrov	Mladen Banushev	Eddie Potter
2009	Nicolae Stoian	Stiliyan Petrov	Daniel Bukowy
2010	Sota Nakano	Michihiro Nagase	Daniel Bukowy
2011	Mirel Iacob	Michi Nagase	Mauricio Alvarado
2012	Sota Nakano	Mirel Iacob	Kiril Boev
2013	Shohei Yamamoto	Mirel Iacob	Skander Youssfi
2014	Reece Henderson	David Tockar	Luigi Scarcella
2015	Kashin Osawa	Sota Nakano	Simon Deguire
2016	Sota Nakano	Enrique Mayers	
2017	Luigi Scarcella	Hoang Nguyen	Jiang Zhu
2018	Luigi Scarcella	Hoang Nguyen	Tanner Nordin
2019	Luigi Scarcella	Shosei Sugiura	Monet Garrett
2020	Anton Torres	Blagovest Petkov	Maksim Osadchenko

=== Lightweight (-70 kg) ===
Year	Gold	Silver	Bronze
2005	Tomofusa Yamakawa	Tomasz Pelczar	Masa Nakao
2006	Masa Nakao	Baldalip Thind	I-Shing Wu
2007	Julio Del Valle	Michiaki Motegi	Piotr Jasica
2008	Alexandar Petrov	Piotr Jasica	Nikola Kirov
2009	Julien Marquette	Nikola Kirov	Masashi Odate
2010	Victor Teixeira	Kotaro Zushi	Adel Al-Tamimi
2011	Taison Naito	Piotr Jasica	Paeden Sakauov
2012	Cyril Zubarev	Sithembiso Majozi	Piotr Jasica
2013	Alim Junusov	Alexander Mikhailov	Kirill Zubarev
2014	Ašot Zarinjan	Tomasz Pelczar	Enrique Mayers
2015	Showta Moriyama	Kohtaro Zushi	Cruz Plata
2016	Alim Junusov	Showta Moriyama	Grzegorz Kedzierski
2017	Alexander Mikhailov	Kirill Zubarev	Ilias Astamirov
2018	Shosei Sugiura	Chrsat Allogho	
2019	Chrsat Allogho	Salamat Demeuov	Sergei Galkin
2020	Christian Buffaloe	Omar Mohammed Alduaij	Kotaro Zushi

== European Weight Category Karate Championships ==
The Kyokushin European Weight Category Karate Championships is the annual Kyokushin Karate European Championship. It has been organized since 1978 and is held in four different weight classes. The first European Championships in 1978 were known as the European Championships in London. After Oyama's death in 1994, the Kyokushi organization disbanded into several other organizations. The original IKO1 organization continued the European Championships under a new name in 1996. Between 1978 and 1996, there were mainly three weight classes, the light series (less than 70 kg), the middle series (less than 80 kg) and the heavy series (more than 80 kg). Exceptionally, the first European Championships had only two weight classes.

=== Super Heavyweight (+90 kg) ===
- The weight limit for the super heavyweight series in 1982 was over 85 kg

Year	Host	Gold	Silver	Bronze
1982	England	Julian Baker	H. Hernandez	Michael Thompson; Gabriel Marxer
1997	Poland	Oleksandr Lapko	Rafal Czerniakowski	Alexander Bielecki; Ion Gorgoiu
1998	Spain	Pavel Mandok	Eusebio Barbero	Siegfied Elson
1999	Ukraine	Oleksandr Lapko	Mihai Gorgoiu	Alexei Drobyazko; Tibor Naby
2000	Portugal	Tomasz Najduch	Florian Ogunade	Alexei Drobyazko; Fabrice Fourmont
2001	Hungary	Tomasz Najduch	Alexei Drobyazko	Marek Kosowski; Adam Solyom
2002	Bulgaria	Tomasz Najduch	Marek Kosowski	Rudolf Conquet; Lucian Sopiridon
2003	Ukraine	Sveto Dekovic	Marek Kosowski	Karol Ciesluk; Arthur Hovhannisyan
2004	Germany	Sokat Sulejmanov	Valentin Krastev	Eduard Wallmen; Alexandre Rodrigues
2005	Bulgaria	Arthur Hovhannisyan	Jan Soukup	Artem Pukas; Rudolf Conquet
2006	Spain	Petar Martinov	Sergej Nikishaev	Piotr Banasik; Alexej Kiushkin
2007	Greece	Jan Soukup	Petar Martinov	Djema Belkhodja; Karol Ciesluk
2008	Spain	Krzysztof Habraszka	Petar Martinov	Djema Belkhodja; Vldyslav Plyasonytsya
2009	Ukraine	Zahari Damjanov	Dmitry Lunev	Djema Belkhodja; Petar Martinov
2010	Romania	Zahari Damjanov	Sergej Uwitskij	Charley Quinol; Daniel Milicevic
2011	Italy	Alejandro Navarro	Djema Belkhodja	Semen Haran; Maxime Demeautis
2012	Hungary	Djema Belkhodja	Marchin Prachino	Nikolai Davydov; Ibragim Gogaev
2013	Ukraine	Zahari Damjanov	Alejandro Navarro	Patryk Sypień
2014	Bulgaria	Zahari Damjanov	Djema Belkhodja	Alejandro Navarro
2015	Germany	Alejandro Navarro	Zahari Damjanov	Djema Belkhodja
2016	Bulgaria	David Sarkoshyan	Tornike Kurtsikidze	Farukh Turgunboev
2017	France	Konstantin Kovalenko	Damian Galinski	Alejandro Navarro
2018	Bulgaria	Konstantin Kovalenko	Goderzi Kapanadze	Alejandro Navarro
2019	Poland	Oleksandr Ieromienko	Constantin Dogari	Maxim Kuzyaev
2020		Canceled due to COVID-19 pandemic		
2021	Poland	Igor Zagainov	Danil Goriushkin	Patryk Sypień

=== Heavyweight (-90 kg) ===
- Years 1978–1995 heavyweight weight limit was +80 kg.
- The weight limit for the heavy series in 1982 was 76–85 kg

Year	Host	Gold	Silver	Bronze
1978	England	Howard Collins	Jeff Whybrow	François Kappeler; Ceno Marxer
1982	England	Ceno Marxer	J. Hernandez	Heinz Forster; A. Lewandowsky
1985	Spain	Andy Hug	Klaus Rex	Lars Jensen; G. Falkenhann
1987	Poland	Michel Wedel	Michael Thompson	Andy Hug; Gabor Peko
1989	Hungary	Andy Hug	Michael Thompson	Juhani Vepsäläinen; Thomas Retsack
1991	Spain	Michael Thompson	Andy Hug	Colm Daly; Juhani Vepsäläinen
1993	Bulgaria	Juhani Vepsäläinen	Igor Timofiev	Rafal Szlazak; Benno Rasmussen
1995	Romania	Nicholas Pettas	Assen Assenov	Oleksandr Lapko; Mikael Wallberg
1996	Greece	Tomasz Najduch	Egil Arne Okland	Georgi Georgiev
1997	Poland	Marek Kosowski	Cayetano Mateo	Egil Arne Okland; Lucian Spiridon
1998	Spain	Mateusz Wojcik	Marek Kosowski	Zeljo Micakovic
1999	Ukraine	Paul Kasprowski	Cayetano Mateo	Lechi Kurbanov; Rafal Szlazak
2000	Portugal	Hitoshi Kiyama	Pavel Mandok	Marek Kubek; Andrej Onopchenko
2001	Hungary	Lechi Kurbanov	Sergej Melyuk	Tomasz Glowacki; Semen Haran
2002	Bulgaria	Akos Aladics	Mark Kubek	Pablo Estensoro; Semen Haran
2003	Ukraine	Krzysztof Habraszka	Pablo Estensoro	Lorant Paksi; Jan Soukup
2004	Germany	Krzysztof Habraszka	Igor Titkov	Pablo Estensoro; Piotr Banasik
2005	Bulgaria	Goderzi Kapanadze	Krzysztof Habraszka	Alejandro Navarro
2006	Spain	Lucian Gogonel	Pablo Estensoro	Alejandro Navarro; Oleksiy Pryhodko
2007	Greece	Lucian Gogonel	Krzysztof Habraszka	Alejandro Navarro; Olexiy Pryhhdko
2008	Spain	Alejandro Navarro	Lucian Gogonel	Pablo Estensoro; Marcin Sieradzki
2009	Ukraine	Alejandro Navarro	Lucian Gogonel	Oleksiy Prikhodko; Pablo Estensoro
2010	Romania	Tariel Nikoleishvili	Mirel Iacob	Oleksandr Ieromienko; Nurmagamed Mamedov
2011	Italy	Oleksandr Ieromienko	Daniel Bukowy	Pablo Estensoro; Marcin Prachnio
2012	Hungary	Oleksandr Ieromienko	Ilja Karpenko	Daniel Bukowy; Marian Negrescu
2013	Ukraine	Oleksandr Ieromienko	Andrei Chirkov	Alexei Medvedev
2014	Bulgaria	Oleksandr Ieromienko	Darmen Sadvokasov	Andrei Chirkov
2015	Germany	Oleksandr Ieromienko	Patryk Sypień	Nicolae Stoian
2016	Bulgaria	Eldar Ismailov	Ivan Mezentsev	David Navoian
2017	France	Antonio Tusseau	Patryk Sypień	Kirill Kotšnev
2018	Bulgaria	Andrei Luzin	Ivan Aksenenko	Kiril Boev
2019	Poland	Andrei Luzin	Alejandro Navarro	Antonio Tusseau
2020		Canceled due to COVID-19 pandemic		
2021	Poland	Alejandro Navarro	Aleksei Fedoseev	Nikita Butko

=== Middleweight (-80 kg) ===
- The weight limit for the middle series in 1982 was 68–76 kg

Year	Host	Gold	Silver	Bronze
1982	England	Fleming Jensen	Nick Da Costa	Jean-Pierre Louisset; Istvan Bodi
1985	Spain	Nick Da Costa	Stanislaw Gwidz	Jose Luna; Heinz Muntwyler
1987	Poland	Peter Smit	Nick Da Costa	Stanislaw Gwidz; Istvan Bodi
1989	Hungary	Nick Da Costa	Miroslav Zuziak	Hans Mars; Jose Luna
1991	Spain	Georgi Georgiev	George Karmazin	Remmert De Vit; Jose Luna
1993	Bulgaria	Hans Mars	Robert van Boxtel	Göran Mohlin
1995	Romania	Paulius Klapatauskas	Eugeniusz Dadziburg	Robert van Boxtel; Dmitar Trampov
1996	Greece	Eugeniusz Dadziburg	Fernando Perez	Pavel Mandok
1997	Poland	Vladimir Zadarozhniy	Florescu Tiberiu	Johannes Berget; Iulian Nichalache
1998	Spain	Emil Kostov	Florescu Tiberiu	Sylwester Sypień
1999	Ukraine	Vadim Jakovenko	Emil Kostov	Ionel Stancu; Mustafa Oksuz
2000	Portugal	Emil Kostov	Semen Haran	Sylwester Sypień; Nicolae Stoian
2001	Hungary	Sylwester Sypień	Aleksandr Goulevich	Ivan Sidoti; Valerij Vasjin
2002	Bulgaria	Emil Kostov	Plamen Jeliazkov	Erik Grindheim; Javier Lezcano
2003	Ukraine	Sylwester Sypień	Nicolae Stoian	Lucian Gogonel; Javier Lezcano
2004	Germany	Lucian Gogonel	Volodymyr Mashov	Otto Megrelishvili; Javier Lezcano
2005	Bulgaria	Lucian Gogonel	Javier Lezcano	Mikhail Tretyakov; Nicolae Stoian
2006	Spain	Evgenyi Shevnin	Volodymyr Mashkov	Nicolae Stoian; Otto Megrelishvili
2007	Greece	Hussein Elikhanov	Javier Lezcano	Nicolae Stoian; Rustam Unezhev
2008	Spain	Nicolae Stoian	Nikita Tomchuk	Stilian Petrov; Michal Krzak
2009	Ukraine	Nicolae Stoian	Aleksandar Komanov	Vusau Ismailov; Michal Krzak
2010	Romania	Giga Shamatava	Vusal Ismailov	Pawel Biszczak; Michal Krzak
2011	Italy	Sultanamet Yunusov	Mirel Jacob	Vusal Ismailov; Lucian Gogonel
2012	Hungary	Mirel Iacob	Lucian Gogonel	Dzhamshed Ulfatov; Skander Youssfi
2013	Ukraine	Gerrard Will	Vladislav Jekimov	Vusal Ismailov
2014	Bulgaria	Antonio Tusseau	Andrej Zubarev	Igor Titkov
2015	Germany	Eldar Ismailov	Lucian Gogonel	Mykyrta Peshenko
2016	Bulgaria	Ašot Zarinjan	Andrej Zuborev	Igor Titkov
2017	France	Alexei Galiev	Lascha Gabarev	Yerbolat Kanapin
2018	Bulgaria	Ašot Zarinjan	Lascha Gabaraev	Dilyan Ivanov
2019	Poland	Ašot Zarinjan	Lascha Gabaraev	Mahmut Tarik Keskin
2020		Canceled due to COVID-19 pandemic		
2021	Poland	Lascha Gabaraev	Grzegorz Kędzierski	Artsem Urbanovitš

=== Lightweight (-70 kg) ===
- The weight limit for the lightweight series in 1982 was 68 kg

Year	Host	Gold	Silver	Bronze
1978	England	Lucien Carbin	Lloyd Payne	Lee Costa; Kent Carlson
1982	England	Lloyd Payne	Hans Biéth	Alan Payne; J. Gonzales
1985	Spain	Marek Drodzowski	Frank Peterson	Csaba Toth; Erdint Arslantas
1987	Poland	Wlodzmierz Roj	Josef Borza	Harald Skog; Eric Wentink
1989	Hungary	Janusz Morys	Luigi D'Amico	Sandor Brezovai; Bessam Ibrahim
1991	Spain	José María Gómez	Janusz Morys	Marino Deflorin; Santiago Alacorn
1993	Bulgaria	Antal Bencze	Martijn Mellaert	Eric Constancia; Christophe Van Schependom
1995	Romania	Antal Bencze	Piotr Sawicki	Michel St. Martory; Mark Goodwin
1996	Greece	Piotr Sawicki	Leszek Zgrzebniak	Plamen Jeliazkov
1997	Poland	Piotr Sawicki	Leszek Zgrzebniak	Lucian Gogonel; Ionel Stancu
1998	Spain	Piotr Sawicki	Michael Biskos	Ahmed Alinak
1999	Ukraine	Lucian Gogonel	Stefan Mocanu	Dimo Tenev; Alon Shualy
2000	Portugal	Piotr Sawicki	Christian Luissint	Ronny Holf; Leszek Zgrzebniak
2001	Hungary	Dmitry Startsev	Waldemar Wiszynski	Artur Szychowski; Shamil Lakaev
2002	Bulgaria	Lucian Gogonel	Semen Jakovenko	Raymond Mikkelsen; Georgi Vasilev
2003	Ukraine	Semen Jakovenko	Juri Lavrinenko	Karen Giadukin; Georgi Vasilev
2004	Germany	Piotr Moczydlowski	Vusal Ismailov	Artyr Babaev; Radovan Bosko
2005	Bulgaria	Dmitry Kuteka	Piotr Moczydlowski	Stilijan Petrov; Piotr Sawicki
2006	Spain	Piotr Moczydlowski	Alexander Shikhalejev	Victor Teixeira; Alexej Linchenko
2007	Greece	Shamil Lakaev	Piotr Moczydlowski	Ionut Mihalache; Stilijan Petrov
2008	Spain	Piotr Moczydlowski	Victor Teixeira	Alexander Mikhailov; Ionut Mihalache
2009	Ukraine	Jevgeni Jakovenko	Victor Teixeira	Piotr Moczydlowski; Antonio Griegorescu
2010	Romania	Stanislav Romanchev	Victor Teixeira	Antonio Griegorescu; Oleksyi Burlutskiy
2011	Italy	Piotr Moczydlowski	Antonio Grigorescu	Marius Stochitoiu; Stheimbisio Majozi
2012	Hungary	Eldar Ismailov	Oleksandr Kostenko	Konrad Will; Alberto Anzalone
2013	Ukraine	Guillaume Gründler	Cyril Zuborev	Alexander Grushenko
2014	Bulgaria	Alexander Mikhailov	Ašot Zarinjan	Eldar Ismailov
2015	Germany	Guillaume Gründler	Anton Khyzhynskyi	Alexander Grushenko
2016	Bulgaria	Kirill Psarev	Alim Junusov	Ilias Astamirov
2017	France	Alim Junusov	Andrei Kotov	Guillaume Gründler
2018	Bulgaria	Kirill Psarev	Alim Junusov	Albert Reyes
2019	Poland	Jevgeni Gluhov	Alim Junusov	Guillaume Gründler
2020		Canceled due to COVID-19 pandemic		
2021	Poland	Georgii Krutykh	Askar Artemev	Wiktor Kolaja

=== Featherweight (-60 kg) ===
Year	Host	Gold	Silver	Bronze
2021	Poland	Kirill Psarev	Daniil Hrabovik	İsmet Durmuş

== IKO1 (Matsui branch) ==
From 1997, the World cup in weight categories has been organized by IKO1 led by Shokei Matsui.

- 1st World cup in weight categories IKO1 (1997, Osaka, Japan)
- 2nd World cup in weight categories IKO1 (10 June 2001, Osaka, Japan)
- 3rd World cup in weight categories IKO1 (1 May 2005, Tokyo, Japan)
- 4th World cup in weight categories IKO1 (23 August 2009, Tokyo-Chiba, Japan)
- 5th World cup in weight categories IKO1 (28 April 2013, Tokyo, Japan)
- 6th World cup in weight categories IKO1 (16 April 2017, Tokyo, Japan)
- 7th World cup in weight categories IKO1 (29 April 2025, Tokyo, Japan)

=== Super Heavyweight (+90 kg) ===
Year	Gold	Silver	Bronze
1997	Francisco Filho	Glaube Feitosa	Nicholas Pettas
2001	Hajime Kazumi	Atsushi Kadoi	Sergei Plehanov
2005	Ewerton Teixeira	Lechi Kurbanov	Alexandre Pichkunov
2009	Mihail Kozlov	Zahari Damjanov	Makoto Akaishi
2013	Shoki Arata	Goderzi Kapanadze	Zahari Damjanov
2017	Shōhei Kamada	Oleksandr Ieromenko	Shoki Arata

=== Heavyweight (-90 kg) ===
Year	Gold	Silver	Bronze
1997	Masayoshi Takaku	Norihisa Horiike	Fumihiro Sugiyama
2001	Hitoshi Kiyama	Sergei Osipov	Naoki Ichimura
2005	Kentaro Tanaka	Maxim Dedik	Fabiano Da Silva
2009	Kentaro Tanaka	Alejandro Navarro	Eduardo Tanaka
2013	Alejandro Navarro	Shōhei Kamada	Ilja Karpenko
2017	Andrei Luzin	Yuta Takahashi	Mikio Ueda

=== Middleweight (-80 kg) ===
Year	Gold	Silver	Bronze
1997	Hitoshi Kiyama	Shinji Adachi	Marcos Costa
2001	Emil Kostov	Hiroyuki Kidachi	Khosro Yaghoubi
2005	Andrews Nakahara	Takamitsu Sakurai	Hiroyuki Kidachi
2009	Zenjūrō Mori	Hiroyuki Kidachi	Shohei Yamamoto
2013	Zenjūrō Mori	Yuta Sawamura	Igor Titkov
2017	Kashin Osawa	Andrei Zuborev	Ašot Zarinjan

=== Lightweight (-70 kg) ===
Year	Gold	Silver	Bronze
1997	Piotr Sawicki	Leszek Zgrzebiniak	Ryū Narushima
2001	Takehara Masafumi	Yuuki Fukuii	Shiro Yaginuma
2005	Lucian Gogonel	Yuzo Suzuki	Osamu Shiojima
2009	Yuzo Suzuki	Tomohiko Matsuoka	Piotr Moczydlowski
2013	Takaichi Onuma	Piotr Moczydlowski	Eldar Ismailov
2017	Yuki Yoza	Alim Junusov	Ilias Astamirov

== WKO (Shinkyokushinkai) ==
From 1997, the World cup in weight categories has been organized by WKO (World Karate Organization Shinkyokushinkai) led by Kenji Midori.

- 1st World cup in weight categories WKO (1997, Chiba, Japan)
- 2nd World cup in weight categories WKO (23 June 2001, Budapest, Hungary)
- 3rd World cup in weight categories WKO (18-19 June 2005, Osaka, Japan)
- 4th World cup in weight categories WKO (20-21 June 2009, St. Petersburg, Russia)
- 5th World cup in weight categories WKO (13-14 April 2013, Vilnius, Lithuania)
- 6th World cup in weight categories WKO (1-2 July 2017, Astana City, Kazakhstan)

Results to be added

== IKO3 (Matsushima branch) ==
From 2002, the World Open Tournament has also been organized by IKO3 led by Yoshikazu Matsushima.

- 1st World cup in weight categories IKO3 (June 2002, Maine, USA)
- 2nd World cup in weight categories IKO3 (4 - 5 November 2006, Sydney, Australia)
- 3rd World cup in weight categories IKO3 (19-20 June 2010, Malaga, Spain)
- 4th World cup in weight categories IKO3 (6-7 September 2014, Durban, South Africa)
- 5th World cup in weight categories IKO3 (17-18 November 2018, Shanghai China)

Results to be added

== Kyokushin Union (Rengokai) ==
From 2009, the World Open Tournament has also been organized by All Japan Kyokushin Union (Kyokushin Rengōkai) led by Yasuhiro Shichinohe.

- 1st World cup in weight categories Rengokai (28 June 2009, Japan)
- 2nd World cup in weight categories Rengokai (6 July 2011, Japan)
- 3rd World cup in weight categories Rengokai (?)
- 4th World cup in weight categories Rengokai (24 October 2015, Schweinfurt, Germany)
- 5th World cup in weight categories Rengokai (12-13 November 2017, Jakarta, Indonesia)
- 6th World cup in weight categories Rengokai (5 -6 October 2019, Moscow, Russia)

Results to be added

== Kyokushin-kan (Royama branch) ==
Results to be added

== So-Kyokushin (Ohishi branch) ==
Results to be added

== IFK ==
Results to be added

== KWF ==
Results to be added

== Ibutz Oyama Cup (IBUSZ Oyama Kupa) ==
The Ibutz Oyama Cup was a Kyokushin karate tournament held in Hungary. It was held three times between 1983 and 1986 at the National Sports Arena in Budapest. The tournament was held in three different weight classes. Kyokushin founder Masutatsu Ōyama first visited Hungary in 1983 and was also involved in overseeing the next two tournaments.

=== Heavyweight (+80 kg) ===
Year	Host	Gold	Silver	Bronze
1983	Hungary	Michel Wedel	Michael Thompson	Janos Boros; Roman Keska
1985	Hungary	Andy Hug	Michel Wedel	Janos Boros; Gabriel Marxer
1986	Hungary	Michel Wedel	Artur Lenda	Michael Thompson; Thomas Rathsack

=== Middleweight (-80 kg) ===
Year	Host	Gold	Silver	Bronze
1983	Hungary	Andy Hug	Margk Niedziokka	Nick Da Costa; D. Nedjalka
1985	Hungary	Nick Da Costa	Glenn Sharpe	Heinz Muntwyler; Istvan Bodi
1986	Hungary	Nick Da Costa	Istvan Bodi	J. Warchol; Martin Holder

=== Lightweight (-70 kg) ===
Year	Host	Gold	Silver	Bronze
1983	Hungary	Josef Borza	David Pickthall	Eric Constancia; Hans Biéth
1985	Hungary	Josef Borza	Erdint Arslantas	Mac Mierzejewski; Csaba Toth
1986	Hungary	Josef Borza	Eric Constancia	J. Szeman; Frank Pettersen

== See also ==
- Kyokushin World Tournament Open
