= Kyokushin World Tournament Open =

Karate event

World Open Karate Championship is the largest competition in Kyokushin Karate. This tournament is arranged every fourth year in Tokyo.

== Rules ==
All world open tournaments operate under knockdown karate rules which involve standup bareknuckle fighting with basically no protection. In contrast to other styles, knockdown karate prohibits punches to the head, and it uses point system that only counts hits that actually "hurt" the opponent. This makes knockdown fighting very physical, but at the same time quite safe considering that there are very few hits to the head. There can be slight variances in the rules between the different organizations responsible for a tournaments although the basics are the same. The rules have also been modified over the years.

Normally knockdown rules include:

- No protectors or guards are used, with the exception of groin guards and protection of the teeth.
- 3 minutes match time
- The fighter that achieves an Ippon (one point) will win the match and the fight is stopped. An Ippon is achieved when an attack either knocks down the opponent for more than 3 seconds or renders the opponent reluctant to continue the fight. An ippon can also be granted if an illegal technique is used or the other fighter is disqualified.
- A fighter can also win the fight by Waza-ari (half point) which is awarded if the opponent is knocked down for less than 3 seconds and is able to continue the fight. If two Waza-aris are achieved during the fight by the same fighter it is counted as an Ippon and the fight is stopped.
- If no knockdowns occur, the judges can declare one fighter as the winner by overall efficiency of techniques, force and spirit.
- In case of a draw there can be a maximum of 3 extensions (each 2 minutes long). Some tournaments will also settle draws by weight difference and the result of Tamaeshiwari (breaking of tiles)

Illegal techniques are

- Punches to the face
- Kicks to the groin
- Grappling, grabbing of any form
- Headbutts
- Kick to knee
- Kick to rear of head
- Pushing
- Strike to spine from rear
- Elbow to face

Read more about various full contact karate rules

== Results ==
=== Before split of IKO ===
Between 1975 and 1991, the World Open Tournament was organized by IKO (International Karate Organization Kyokushinkaikan), led by Mas Oyama. The event was held five times:

- 1st World Open Tournament (1–3 November 1975) with 128 competitors from 32 countries
- 2nd World Open Tournament (23–25 November 1979) with 187 competitors from 62 countries
- 3rd World Open Tournament (20–22 January 1984) with 192 competitors from 60 countries
- 4th World Open Tournament (6–8 November 1987) with 207 competitors from 77 countries
- 5th World Open Tournament (2–4 November 1991) with 250 competitors from 105 countries

Place	1st World Open	2nd World Open	3rd World Open	4th World Open	5th World Open
1	Katsuaki Satō	Makoto Nakamura	Makoto Nakamura	Akiyoshi Matsui	Kenji Midori
2	Hatsuo Royama	Keiji Sanpei	Keiji Sanpei	Andy Hug	Akira Masuda
3	Joko Nimoniya	Willie Williams	Akiyoshi Matsui	Akira Masuda	Hiroki Kurosawa
4	Daigo Oishi	Takashi Azuma	Ademir Da Costa	Michael Thompson	Jean Riviere
5	Toshikazu Sato	Howard Collins	Yasuto Onishi	Ademir Da Costa	Kenji Yamaki
6	Takashi Azuma	Bernard Creton	Nicholas Da Costa	Hiroki Kurosawa	Yutaka Ishii
7	Charles W. Martin	Ceno Maxer	Keizo Tahara	Yasuhiro Shichinohe	Yasuhiro Shichinohe
8	Frank Clark	Koichi Kawabata	Dave Greaves	Nicholas Da Costa	Johnny Kleyn

After the death of Mas Oyama in 1994, IKO split up into several factions. The World Open Tournament has continued to be held but organised in parallel by several organizations.

=== IKO1 (Matsui branch) ===
From 1995, the World Open Tournament has been organized by IKO1 led by Shokei Matsui.

- 6th World Open Tournament IKO1 (3–5 November 1995) with 168 competitors from 85 countries
- 7th World Open Tournament IKO1 (5–7 November 1999) with 192 competitors from 86 countries
- 8th World Open Tournament IKO1 (1–3 November 2003) with 240 competitors from 63 countries
- 9th World Open Tournament IKO1 (16–18 November 2007) with 192 competitors from 65 countries
- 10th World Open Tournament IKO1 (4–6 November 2011) with 192 competitors from 43 countries
- 11th World Open Tournament IKO1 (20–22 November 2015) with 192 competitors from 46 countries
- 12th World Open Tournament IKO1 (22–24 November 2019) with 164 competitors from 38 countries
- 13th World Open Tournament IKO1 (17–19 November 2023) with 166 competitors from 35 countries

Place	6th World Open	7th World Open	8th World Open	9th World Open	10th World Open	11th World Open	12th World Open	13th World Open
1	Kenji Yamaki	Francisco Filho	Hitoshi Kiyama	Ewerton Teixeira	Tariel Nikoleishvili	Zahari Damyanov	Mikio Ueda	Aleksandr Eremenko
2	Hajime Kazumi	Hajime Kazumi	Sergey Plekhanov	Jan Soukup	Ewerton Teixeira	Djema Belkhodja	Aleksandr Eremenko	Kaito Nishimura
3	Francisco Filho	Alexander Pichkunov	Ewerton Teixeira	Artur Oganasian	Goderzi Kapanadze	Darmen Sadvokasov	Andrei Luzin	Andrei Luzin
4	Garry O'Neill	Glaube Feitosa	Glaube Feitosa	Darmen Sadvokasov	Makoto Akaishi	Kiril Kochnev	Yuta Takahashi	Antonio Tusseau
5	Nicholas Pettas	Nicholas Pettas	Lechi Kurbanov	Andrey Stepin	Zahari Damyanov	Ashot Zarinyan	Konstantin Kovalenko	Igor Zagainov
6	Hiroki Kurosawa	Yasuhiro Kimura	Yasuhiro Kimura	Alejandro Navarro	Nikolai Davydov	Mikio Ueda	Ryunosuke Hoshi	Konstantin Kovalenko
7	Luciano Basile	Ryuta Noji	Sergey Osipov	Eduardo Tanaka	Alexander Yeremenko	Ivan Mezentsev	Igor Zagainov	Maksim Ekimov
8	Glaube Feitosa	Ryu Narushima	Hiroyuki Kidachi	Tatsuya Murata	Ilya Karpenko	Shoki Arata	Shoki Arata	Aleksei Fedoseev

=== WKO (Shinkyokushinkai) ===
From 1996, the World Open Tournament has also been organized by WKO (World Karate Organization Shinkyokushinkai) led by Kenji Midori.

- 6th World Open Tournament WKO (February 1996) with 172 competitors
- 7th World Open Tournament WKO (5–6 December 1999) with 128 competitors from 53 countries
- 8th World Open Tournament WKO (4–5 October 2003) with 128 competitors from 63 countries
- 9th World Open Tournament WKO (13–14 October 2007) with 128 competitors
- 10th World Open Tournament WKO (4–6 November 2011) with 129 competitors from 52 countries
- 11th World Open Tournament WKO (31 October – 1 November 2015) with 164 competitors from 60 countries
- 12th World Open Tournament WKO (9–10 November 2019) with 161 competitors from 71 countries
- 13th World Open Tournament WKO (14–15 October 2023)

Place	6th World Open	7th World Open	8th World Open	9th World Open	10th World Open	11th World Open	12th World Open	13th World Open
1	Norichika Tsukamoto	Toru Okamoto	Kunihiro Suzuki	Takayuki Tsukagoshi	Norichika Tsukamoto	Yuji Shimamoto	Yuji Shimamoto	Kembu Iriki
2	Kunihiro Suzuki	Muzaffer Bacak	Yuichiro Osaka	Donatas Imbras	Tsutomo Muruyama	Kembu Iriki	Maciej Mazur	Valeri Dimitrov
3	Kou Tanigawa	Satoshi Niiho	Takayuki Tsukakoshi	Valeri Dimitrov	Roman Nesterenko	Lukas Kubilius	Daiki Kato	Edgard Secinski
4	Tsuyoshi Murase	Kouji Abiko	Valeri Dimitrov	Roman Nesterenko	Lukas Kubilius	Shota Maeda	Valeri Dimitrov	Anton Zimarev
5	Akira Masuda	Kunihiro Suzuki	Francisco Jose Carpena	Maxim Shevchenko	Brian Jakobsen	Kazufumi Shimamoto	Kosei Ochiai	Kosei Ochiai
6	Hiroyuki Miake	Tadashi Ishihara	Muzaffer Bacak	Darius Gudauskas	Andrey Materov	Nazar Nasirov	Eventas Guzauskas	Yuki Okada
7	Toru Okamoto	Yuichiro Osaka	Norichika Tsukamoto	Norichika Tsukamoto	Yuji Shimamoto	Edgard Sečinski	Yuto Eguchi	Ryuji Toda
8	Kouji Abiko	Viktor Karasyuk	Daniel Torok	Denis Grigoriev	Yevgeniy Andrushko	Maciej Mazur	Ilya Yakovlev	Yusaku Watanabe

=== IKO3 (Matsushima branch) ===
From 2000, the World Open Tournament has also been organized by IKO3 led by Yoshikazu Matsushima.

- 6th World Open Tournament IKO3 - Not held, info needed?
- 7th World Open Tournament IKO3 (25-26 November 2000, Tokyo, Japan)
- 8th World Open Tournament IKO3 (27-28 November 2004, Isesaki City, Japan)
- 9th World Open Tournament IKO3 (29-30 November 2008, Isesaki City, Japan)
- 10th World Open Tournament IKO3 (23-24 June 2012, Tokyo, Japan)
- 11th World Open Tournament IKO3 (26-27 November 2016, Maebashi, Japan)
- 12th World Open Tournament IKO3 -info needed

Place	6th World Open	7th World Open	8th World Open	9th World Open	10th World Open	11th World Open	12th World Open
1	?	Thorsten Domke	Hadi Azikhani	Anzor Shikhabakhov	Reza Goodary	Ali Orace	?
2	?	Bela Haszmann	Hassan Nazemi	Issa Parvari	Artur Tilov	Sajjad Mohajeri	?
3	?	Raoul Strikker	Arash Sharifi	Sajad Heidari	Aleksander Karshigeev	Denis Morozevich	?
4	?	Igor Struikhim	Haidar Mohammed	Sergey Doronin	Aleksander Ibragimov	Mehrdad Ramzani	?
5	?	Alexander Sitnikov	Andrey Noskov	Rasim Samedov	Amin Azimi	Mdliduzi Mseleku	?
6	?	Diego Beltran	Anatoly Boronnikov	Saeid Sefari	Naser Karami	Denys Maxymov	?
7	?	Yevgeny Pechenin	Eissa Oghani	Gia Gvenetadze	Sajjad Heidarinaghdali	Thondwaylakosi Ndlovu	?
8	?	Kiko Muira	Alexander Ibragimov	Laszlo Hacsko	Amir Reza Moradian	Reza Goodary	?

=== Kyokushin Union (Rengokai) ===
From 2004, the World Open Tournament has also been organized by All Japan Kyokushin Union (Kyokushin Rengōkai) led by Yasuhiro Shichinohe.

- 1st World Open Tournament Rengōkai (18 January 2004, Shizuoka, Japan)
- 2nd World Open Tournament Rengōkai (19–20 January, Japan, 2008) - held in weight categories
- 3rd World Open Tournament Rengōkai (10–11 November, Toyama, Japan, 2012)
- 4th World Open Tournament Rengōkai (20–21 January, Toyama, Japan, 2017)

They decided though to renumber the event starting with World Open Tournament 1. Also note that the second event in 2008 was organized in weight categories and is therefore not presented here.

Place	1st World Open	2nd World Open	3rd World Open	4th World Open
1	Masaake Shimajiri	several	Takuma Koketsu	Yuya Nagata
2	Anzor Shikhabakhov	several	Jonathan Tineo	Timur Raiymbekov
3	Alexander Ibragiumov	several	Kevin Wiklund	Yudai Ishimine
4	Jiri Onoue	several	Yuhei Ashitaka	Shi Shigematsu
5	Hiroshi Sugiyama	several	Akihito Teruya	Yasumichi Kikuyama
6	Yasumichi Kikuyama	several	Jonathan Redondo	Akihito Teruya
7	Takeshi Miyagi	several	Masaru Sato	Kim Jong Kil
8	Timofei Tsyganov	several	Syota Yamaguchi	Yuhei Ashitaka

=== So-Kyokushin (Oishi branch) ===
Results to be added

== See also ==
- Kyokushin World Cup in Weight Categories
