= Tsuyoshi Hiroshige =

Korean-born Japanese martial artist

- Born: November 1, 1947; Kitakyushu, Fukuoka prefecture
- Died: April 18, 2018 (aged 70)
- Style: Kyokushin, Yiquan
- Rank: 9th dan karate

Other information
- Notable students: Kenji Midori, Hajime Kazumi, Garry O'Neill

Tsuyoshi Hiroshige (廣重 毅, Hiroshige Tsuyoshi)(born November 1, 1947 – April 18, 2018) was a Japanese martial artist and karate instructor. Hiroshige is the founder and first chairman of Kyokushin Budo Karate Organization Kyokushin Kenbukai.

== History ==
Tsuyoshi Hiroshige was born in Kitakyushu, Fukuoka Prefecture on November 1, 1947. In June 1973, when Hiroshige was 25 years old, he entered the Kyokushin Kaikan General Headquarters.

While Mas Oyama was alive, Hiroshige was in charge of the Tokyo Jonan Branch of the International Karate Organization. During his time as the head of the Jonan Kawasaki branch, he tutored many future legends of the Kyokushin Karate. These include Kenji Midori (currently Shinkyokushinkai representative), and Hajime Kazumi. After the death of Kyokushin founder Mas Oyama in April 1994, Hiroshige was the director of the Kanto Headquarters of the Kyokushin Kaikan, during the time when organization was headed by Shokei Matsui. In December 2002, having disagreed with the direction Shokei Matsui was taking Kyokushin, Hiroshige, along with Hatsuo Royama, quit Matsui's Kyokushin organization.

The following year, in January 2003, he joined the Kyokushin-kan International Organization Honbu, which was established by Hatsuo Royama, and served as the organization's deputy director. In Kyokushin-Kan, he would again tutor many martial artists that would later win Karate championships, including Ryosuke Tokaibayashi, Nozomu Natsuhara, Yusuke Fujii, and Masaki Fujii. To honour for his prestige in martial arts instruction, the 1st Hiroshige Dojo Cup Kyokushin Karate Championship was held at the Kawasaki Gymnasium in August 2013.

In February 2017 he resigned from the post of deputy director, voluntarily withdrew from Kyokushin-kan. Hiroshige would subsequently establish the "Kyokushin Budo Karate Organization Kyokushin Kenbukai". Hiroshige died on April 18, 2018, at the age of 70.
