= Czech Samurai =

Nickname the Czech Samurai may refer to:

- Jan Soukup (born 1979), a Czech karateka and a retired kickboxer, the branch chief for International Karate Organization World Kyokushin Kaikan in Czech Republic, the president of the Czech Karate Kyokushinkai Association and the vice president of the Czech Fullcontact Karate Organization.
- Jiří Procházka (born 1984), a Czech professional mixed martial artist, former UFC Light Heavyweight champion and former amateur Muay Thai kickboxer.
- František Kollman (1947-2023), a Czech jujutsuka (1965 world champion and 9th dan), judoka (1963 national champion and 6th dan), bodyguard of the last Czechoslovak and first Czech president Václav Havel, security chief for the Civic Forum and painter.

== See also ==
- The Blue-Eyed Samurai
