= Hajime Kazumi =

Karate instructor

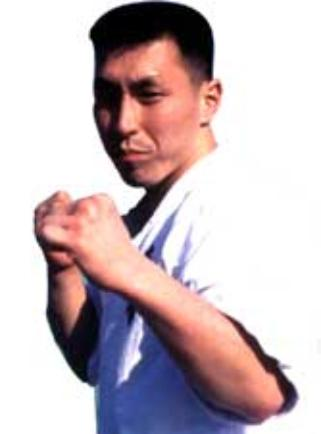
- Kazumi in the 1990s
- Born: Kazumi Hajime; December 14, 1971 (age 54); Kawasaki, Kanagawa, Japan
- Nationality: Japanese
- Height: 1.80 m (5 ft 11 in)
- Weight: 100 kg (220 lb; 16 st)
- Style: Kazumi Karate (founder); Kyokushin Karate, Taikiken (Yiquan)
- Teacher: Tsuyoshi Hiroshige
- Rank: 6th Dan Black Belt in Kyokushin Karate

Hajime Kazumi (数見 肇, Kazumi Hajime) (born December 14, 1971) is a Japanese karateka. Born in Kanagawa prefecture, Kazumi is a karate fighter who played an active part in the full-contact karate tournaments hosted by Kyokushinkaikan from the early 1990s to the early 2000s.

He started Kyokushin karate at age of fifteen and at age twenty Kazumi defeated many top fighters to reach the finals of the 24th All Japan Championship in 1992. Since then Kazumi has never finished outside of the top two places in any tournament. His effective punching and kicking combinations helped him reach the finals of six All Japan Tournaments in a row, winning four of these to break Keiji Senpai's record. He also reached the finals of two World Open Tournaments where he lost to Francisco Filho on boards and Kenji Yamaki, training partner and fellow student of Tsuyoshi Hiroshige's Jonan Branch.

Kazumi is recognized as one of Kyokushin Karate's most successful full-contact fighters. He is currently director of Hajime Kazumi Dojo, where he works as an instructor of karate fighting techniques. Kazumi currently holds 6th dan black belt.

== Background ==
Born in Kawasaki, Kanagawa Prefecture. He had aspirations to become strong and as soon as he began elementary school, his father, who was also a Karate practitioner, pressured him to join the Kyokushin Kaikan General Headquarters Dojo. However, in the second grade of elementary school, he decided to quit Kyokushin. His sport interests then laid in soccer and sumo, but at the age of 13, he became interested in Kyokushin again after reading the manga Karate Baka Ichidai. In particular, he admired the scene of special training in the mountains and wanted to try it out himself.

At that time, Shokei Matsui was instructing at the General Headquarters. While Matsui cautioned Kazumi to reconsidered, he also told Kazumi that if he invested in the art, Kazumi would be rewarded by it.

After entering high school, he transferred to the Tokyo Jonan Kawasaki branch near his home and studied under Tsuyoshi Hiroshige. His seniors in Kyokushin included Kenji Midori, Sadao Sakai, Kenji Yamaki, Masahiro Kaneko, and Tatsuya Iwasaki. In particular, having a large senior like Yamaki train him made Kazumi very confident in himself. Kazumi, who participated in the first high school tournament at the age of 17, was runner-up. Around this time, he was doing kumite, such as jumping knee kicks and jumping backward kicks.

== Career ==
=== Debut up to 6th World Championship ===
In 1992, Kazumi's first entry in a Karate tournament was participating in the 24th Open Tournament All Japan Karate Championships. At the time, Kazumi's only accolade was winning FTV Cup Tohoku Tournament in the same year, but was otherwise deemed as a unremarkable participant. He fought and won against also fresh Akira Masuda in the third round on the second day. Kazumi gained momentum and defeated other successive open tournament World Open Karate Championship representatives. He beat Hiroyuki Miake in the 4th round. After defeating Yutaka Ishii in the quarterfinals and Yasuhiro Shichino in the semifinals, Kazumi advanced to the finals.

Although he lost to Yoshihiro Tamura in the final match, he won second place in his first appearance and was named the break-out sportsman of the event. Kyokushin founder Mas Oyama praised Kazumi's performance, quote "To think [Kazumi] is still in his 20s and yet is so strong? I'm looking forward to [his] future."

In 1993, he participated in the 1st Open Tournament All Kanto Karatedo Championships, and won two of the five tournament games with a left middle mawashi geri and a left lower mawashi geri. In the same year, he participated in the 25th All Japan Championship as a seed player for "Number 1". Again, Kazumi reached the finals and final match was against Yoshihiro Tamura, the same opponent whom he lost to last year. The fight was intense and dragged on, requiring two extensions. Kazumi would be declared the winner by 5–0 decision and achieved his first victory at the youngest age of 21 in history. In addition, he became the last champion to win the championship cup when Mas Oyama was still alive.

In the 26th All Japan Championship of 1994, his final match was against Kenji Yamaki, his Kyokushin senior. Kazumi lost the match by decision and ended up as the runner-up. He was elected as the representative of the World Championship the following year.

In the 6th World Championship of 1995, he successfully won from the D block, and in the 4th round, he took the judgment victory from Norihisa Horiike of the Hyogo branch and won against Brazilian Glaube Feitosa in the quarterfinals. Kazumi would fight Francisco Filho in the semi-finals. Filho fought fiercely in overtime and two extensions. Kazumi won by split decision. In the final match, he faced Yamaki yet again, but Kazumi was defeated and ended up as the runner-up.

=== All Japan Championship 3 consecutive victories ===
The 28th Open Tournament All Japan Karatedo Championships in 1996 would be dominated by the Australian Garry O'Neill. All Japanese fighters had lost to him and O'Neil would advance to finals.

Kazumi on the other-hand had defeated Norihisa Horiike in the quarter-finals and Masaki Takao and the Hyogo branch in the semi-finals. However, the fights had left his body in very bad condition, with Kazumi having his left toenail peeled off, his right knee ligament stretched, and his right arm broken. Kazumi would win his fight against O'Neil by 3–0 decision, earning Kazumi his second victory of his career.

In 1997, he had cruised the 29th All Japan Championship without any real challenge, until reaching the finals, where Kazumi would fight Gary O'Neil again. The fight was intense and would go overtime. With 30 remaining in overtime, O'Neil would collapse following left side mawashi-geri kicks from Kazumi, having now won his third overall and second consecutive victory.

At the 30th All Japan Championship in 1998, Kazumi would overwhelming win all the fights and he achieved his fourth overall victory with three consecutive victories. Kazumi was elected to the representative of the World Open Karate Championships the following year.

=== 100-man kumite and the 7th World Championships ===
On March 13, 1999, Kazumi challenged the 100-man kumite. One person fought 100 people in 1 minute 30 seconds. Opponents include Francisco Filho, Hitoshi Kiyama, Ryuta Noji, Yasuhiko Kimura, Masayoshi Takaku, Yoshihiro Tamura, Naoki Ichimura, Ryu Narushima, Shinji Adachi, who were selected as representatives of the 7th World Open Karate Championship. Kenji Yamaki served as the 100th opponent. Kazumi completed the 100-kumite. Immediately after the completion, he went straight to the hospital because of chills, nausea and pain.

At the 7th World Championship held in November of the same year, he defeated Glaube Feitosa in the semi-finals, advanced to the finals, and rematched with Filho. The match with Filho dragged through various overtimes, eventually brought to split decision. Kazumi lost and become the runner, whereas Filho would be the first foreigner to win the Kyokushin World Championship in 27 years of its inception from 1975.

== Subsequent championship participation and retirement ==
In June 2001, he participated in the heavyweight class of the 2nd Open Tournament All Japan Weight Category Karatedo Championships as a representative of Japan and won the championship.

In the 34th All Japan Championship in November 2002, he won the championship for the fifth time by winning a close battle with Hitoshi Kiyama until the re-extension in the final match. Kazumi was elected to represent the 8th Open Tournament World Open Karate Championship the following year. However, Kazumi decided to retire from karate at the end of the championship and declined to participate in the world championship. Then, in December of the same year, he left the Kyokushin Kaikan (Matsui school).

In January 2003, he temporarily acted as a deputy director at the Kyokushin-kan. He left the organization and subsequently opened the Japan Karate-do Kazumi Dojo.

== Personal life ==
Hajime Kazumi is said to be humble and discreet, a spiritually and mentally strong person who doesn't put himself above others.

On 24 November 2002, Kazumi officially resigned from Kyokushin-kaikan (Kanchō Shokei Matsui) to join a new organization led by Hatsuo Royama and his instructor Tsuyoshi Hiroshige. Kazumi's reason for leaving the IKO1 was to "pursue true Budo Karate". He later resigned from the newly established Kyokushin-kan organisation to become the leader of an independent group of dojos operating in the Tokyo area.

With Tatsuya Iwasaki, Kazumi is the author of Shinseki Real Karate Bible, a manual for instruction of full-contact kumite (fighting) with accompanying DVD. He also produces Internet training videos for full-contact instruction.

== Fighting Style ==
Kazumi has integrated Taikiken (off-shoot of Yiquan created by Kenichi Sawai) training into his karate practice, and has modified his fighting style to rely on punching and low kicks instead of the high kicks that are characteristic of Kyokushin karate. This strategy made him a successful fighter, demonstrated by his record of wins.

He specializes in executing thrusting and kicking techniques with high accuracy and delicate timing. In his early full-contact career, his main methods of attack were a lower, middle and upper mawashi-geri, the kakato otoshi geri (axe kick) and Ushirogeri (back kick).

== Tournament history ==
- 2nd World Weight Tournament 2001 (IKO1) – 1st Place
- 7th World Open Tournament 1999 (IKO1) – 2nd Place (lost to Francisco Filho)
- 6th World Open Tournament 1995 (IKO1) – 2nd Place (lost to Kenji Yamaki)
- 1st World Team Cup 1998 (IKO1) – 1st Place (Defeated Brazil)
- 34th All Japan Open Karate Tournament 2002 (IKO1) – 1st Place (Defeated Hitoshi Kiyama)
- 30th All Japan Open Karate Tournament 1998 (IKO1) – 1st Place (Defeated Yoshihiro Tamura)
- 29th All Japan Open Karate Tournament 1997 (IKO1) – 1st Place (Defeated Garry O'Neill)
- 28th All Japan Open Karate Tournament 1996 (IKO1) – 1st Place (Defeated Garry O'Neill)
- 26th All Japan Open Karate Tournament 1994 – 2nd Place (lost to Kenji Yamaki)
- 25th All Japan Open Karate Tournament 1993 – 1st Place (Defeated Yoshihiro Tamura)
- 24th All Japan Open Karate Tournament 1992 – 2nd Place (lost to Yoshihiro Tamura)

== 100 man kumite ==
Hajime Kazumi completed his 100 man kumite at the new IKO1 Honbu in 1999. Results were obtained from the official IKO1 site and are as follows:

- Time per Kumite 1 minute 30 seconds
- Time Started 11:38
- Time Finished 15:42
- Total Fighting Time 3 hours 20 minutes 40 seconds
- Total Spending Time 4 hours 4 minutes
- Results 58 wins, 42 draws, no losses
- Ippons: 16 (Ippon: 2, Awase-Ippon: 14)
- Wins by decision: 42 (Waza-ari: 15)

== See also ==
- Hatsuo Royama
- Kenichi Sawai
