= Kyeok Sul Do =

North Korean martial art

Kyeok Sul Do 격술도
- Also known as: Kyeok Sul, Gjogsul, Kyŏksul, Gyuksul
- Focus: Striking, Throwing, Joint Locks
- Country of origin: North Korea
- Date of formation: 1960s
- Creator: No single creator
- Parenthood: Shotokan Karate, Boxing, Wrestling, Karatedo Kendokai, Taekwondo (ITF), Sambo
- Olympic sport: No

- Kyeok Sul Do
- Hangul: 격술도
- Hanja: 撃術道
- Revised Romanization: Gyeok sul do
- McCune–Reischauer: Kyŏk sul to

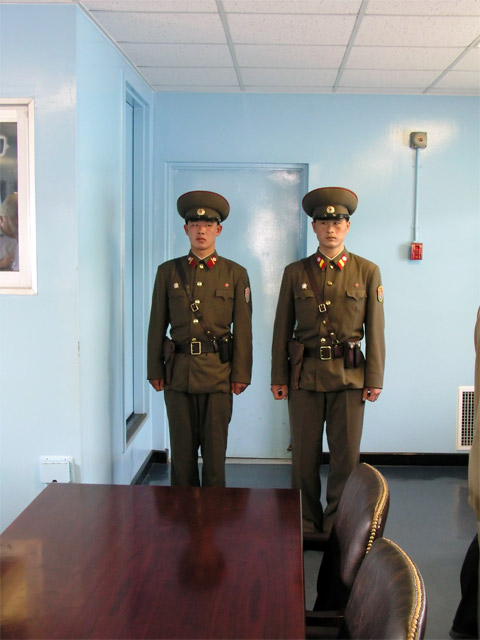
Kyeok Sul Do is generally associated with North Korean military personnel.

Kyeok Sul Do (Hangul: 격술도), also often romanized as Kyeok Sul or Gjogsul, is a martial art and a combat sport created in the Democratic People's Republic of Korea (i.e. North Korea) that is practised primarily by personnel of the Korean People's Army and its intelligence agencies.

Kyeok Sul Do was also taught to the armies of Eastern European states that were part of the former Warsaw Pact.

Kyeok Sul Do bears no historical or organizational relationship to the South Korean martial art Kuk Sul Do, despite their similar names.

== History ==
Kyeok Sul originated in North Korea during the 1960s, influenced by Shotokan Karate, Wrestling, and Boxing It is known to have further evolved in the 1970s through the influence of Hideo Nakamura’s Karatedo Kendokai, ITF Taekwondo, and Sambo. News of Kyeok Sul first reached South Korea toward the end of the Park Chung-hee administration, following accounts of a wartime hand-to-hand combat experiment conducted by the Ministry of National Defense; in these encounters, South Korean Special Forces soldiers trained in Taekwondo were reportedly defeated and knocked unconscious in a single blow by a North Korean defector skilled in Kyeok Sul. Additionally, testimonies from North Korean defectors recount an incident—likely occurring in 1979—where operatives from a North Korean special forces light infantry brigade (attached to the IV Corps) got into a fight in Kaesong, North Korea, with Olympic boxing medalists, resulting in the death of one of the boxers. The altercation involved three light infantry operatives and two boxers, and it is said that one of the Olympic medalists died after being struck by a fist hardened like steel.

According to defector An Myeong-jin, the trainees hit each other's bodies with thick ropes and exercised striking by hitting on concrete and/or a haystack, with reportedly some trainees dying from these exercises.

In the 1980s, there was a North Korean Movie called Order No. 027 that lead to influx of young North Koreans becoming interested in Kyeok Sul Do. (Note: The movie is about North Korean special forces that infiltrate South Korea and carry out intelligence activities. The movie features Kyeok Sul Do and its throwing techniques used by the protagonists. The movie was very impactful, as there was limited entertainment in North Korea.)

There are martial arts competitions in North Korea built around Kyeok Sul Do. According to historical records referred by Mookas martial arts magazine, "the earlier contests were about the same as boxing, but in 1987's 7th contest, it evolved to the level of kickboxing."

Among North Korea, operatives called "guides" who escort operatives during landing operations, and 24 reconnaissance battalions belonging to the Reconnaissance General Bureau. These sorts of operatives are believed to be involved in fushin-sen cases in Japan.

Korean Central Television often broadcasts North Korean soldiers performing Kyeok Sul Do techniques. In addition, North Korean internet sites also distribute videos of demonstrations on YouTube and other media as part of their propaganda efforts.

There are also cases where the militaries of the former Warsaw Pact countries were introduced and taught Kyeok Sul Do. It was adopted by the National People's Army of the German Democratic Republic (East Germany) in 1988, with instructors from the Korean People's Army brought to the country. This began when Colonel-General Horst Stechbarth took a three-week course in the DPRK after negotiations with the Korean People's Army, during which close National People's Army (or NVA) wrestling instructors were trained in Kyeok Sul Do.

Earlier, the martial art was already successfully introduced in the Polish People's Republic. At the same time, the NVA instructors tuned the Kyeok Sul Do and introduced the system as a whole, primarily for the airborne forces like Luftsturmregiment 40. For close quarters training, the Die Nahkampfweste Modell 1985 (English: Melee Vest Model 1985) was used for protection.

== Technique ==
Kyeok Sul is based on striking mostly. However, despite being a standup fighting style, it was influenced not only by Boxing, Karate and Taekwondo but also by Wrestling and Sambo. While the early tournaments resembled boxing matches, the sport evolved to a kickboxing-like level by the 7th tournament in 1987, and by the 19th tournament in 1990, it had progressed to the point where gloves were eliminated entirely. Matches consist of three 3-minute rounds, and any type of strike is permitted, with the exception of eye-gouging and strikes to the groin.
