= Kenichi Sawai =

Kenichi Sawai (澤井 健一, Sawai Ken'ichi; 1903–1988) was a Japanese martial artist and a colonel in the Japanese army. Sawai is known for his background in the martial art style Yiquan, his association with founder of Kyokushin Karate, Mas Oyama and influence on various notable early Kyokushin practitioners. Sawai also found his own martial art named Taiki Seisei Kenpo, called Taikiken for short.

== Background ==
Kenichi Sawai was born in 1903 at the Fukuoka prefecture. He studied martial arts from an early age and acquired fifth-dan grade in judo under Sanpo Toku fourth-dan in kendo, and fourth-dan in Iaido.

In 1931, he moved to Manchuria (China). In Beijing, he met and witnessed Wang Xiangzhai, the founder of Yiquan. He made several attempts to defeat Wang, including one where he fought with a shinai whilst Wang used only a stick. However, Kenich was soundly defeated each time. Kenichi subsequently pleaded for a week to be taught Yiquan by Wang.

Initially, Wang had principle of not accepting foreign students, but saw Sawai's enthusiasm as earnest and took him as his pupil. However, virtually all of his training was provided by Wang's student, Yao Zongxun.

After Japan's defeat during World War II, Sawai was contemplating about committing suicide with his family, but on that day Wang Xiangzhai visited Sawai's home and managed to talk Sawai out of the suicide attempt. Instead, Wang wanted Sawai to leave to Japan and spread the essence of Yiquan to its people.

== Taikiken ==
Taikiken
- Focus: Striking, Throws, and Joint Locks
- Hardness: Full contact
- Country of origin: Japan
- Creator: Kenichi Sawai
- Famous practitioners: Toshio Fujiwara
- Parenthood: Yiquan

Kenichi subsequently returned to Japan in 1947. Since Yiquan was a foreign style, Sawai had to rename the style in order to spread it to native Japanese people. Initially, the style was to be called Taiseiken, but with permission from Wang Xiangzhai, he added a single letter "ki", and founded Taiki Seiseikenpo, also known as Taikiken. Subsequently, he started practising with a few disciples at Meiji Shrine. Following the Taoist teachings of his teacher, he practiced in nature and did not have a permanent dojo.

== Impact on early Kyokushin practitioners ==
Sawai had a great influence on many martial artist, and was praised for his martial arts expertise. There was a deep working relationship with Mas Oyama, the founder of the Kyokushinkai, and various disciples of the early days of the Kyokushinkai trained under Sawai to learn Taikiken. These include Hatsuo Royama and Jan Kallenbach (who would become one of the notable teachers of Taikiken) and others. He also interacted with Dutch Judoka Anton Geesink, when he was involved with Kyokushinkai and learned Taikiken from Sawai. Hajime Kazumi, while not directly taught by Sawai, integrated the elements of Taikiken into his Kyokushin fighting style.

== Books ==
- Taiki-Ken: The Essence of Kung-Fu (Japan Publications 1976). ISBN 978-0870403736
