= Hiroto Okazaki =

Zainichi Korean karateka (born 1961)

- Born: April 8, 1961 (age 65); Fukushima prefecture (Born in Japan)
- Style: Kyokushin, Iaido
- Teacher: Hatsuo Royama
- Rank: 9th dan Kyokushin-kan Karate

Other information
- Website: https://www.kyokushinkan-intl.org/

Hiroto Okazaki (Hiroto Okazaki, born 8 April 1961) is a master of Kyokushin Karate, who is the current Kancho (Director) of the Kyokushin-kan International Organization Honbu, one faction of the International Karate Organization (IKO) founded by Mas Oyama (1923–1994). He is also a 16th-generation grandmaster of Mugai-Ryu Iai Hyodo, a style of Iaido carried forward since 17th-century Japan.
