= Hideo Nakamura =

Korean Japanese karateka (1913–2013)

Hideo Nakamura (中村 日出夫, Nakamura, Hideo; born Kang Chang-Soo (Korean: 강창수; Hanja: 姜昌秀); June 16, 1913 – January 8, 2013) was a karateka from the Korean Peninsula. He was the first president of the Karatedo Kendokai, being ranked 10th dan.

== Biography ==
- June 16, 1913 - Born in Pyongyang, the Korean Peninsula, which was Japanese territory at the time.
- 1921 - Began practising martial arts at age of 9, under the guidance of his uncle who was a martial artist.
- 1926 - When he moved to mainland Japan alone at the age of 14, he started karate in earnest.
- 1930 - At the same time as entering Third Higher grade in School, he entered Budo Senmon Gakko.
- 1933- Enrolled in the Faculty of Law at Kyoto Imperial University, and in the same year became a karate instructor at the Budo Senmon Gakko.
- 1937 - Graduated from Kyoto Imperial University.
- 1943 - Awarded a 6th Dan Renshi by the Dai Nippon Butoku Kai.
- 1947- while running a construction business in Kofu, Yamanashi Prefecture, he established Karate Dojo "Shutokukan" (修得館 shūtoku-kan).
- 1957 - The Yamanashi Karatedo Federation was formed and he became its first chairman and full-time instructor.
- 1968 - Moved the base of activities from Yamanashi prefecture to Tokyo.
- 1983 - Established Karatedo Kendokai and became its first chairman.
- 1997 - Leaves the chairmanship to his disciple Kei Ishiyama and becomes the president of the Kendokai. For a long time since then, he has been actively instructing the younger generation of the entire society.
- Died on January 8, 2013, at 99 years old.

== Personal life and anecdotes ==
He was known for the performance of "Rafter cutting", in which he cuts timber with bare hands. This is named because Nakamura's straight fist thrust left a smooth cross section cut that was as if it was cut by a blade than broken with a punch.

According to "Why did Masahiko Kimura not kill Rikidozan?", Nakamura had a friendship with Rikidozan, who also from the northern part of the Korean Peninsula. It is said that Rikidozan adore Nakamura and called him "Hyun Nim" which means his brother in Korean. Apparently, training alongside Nakamura birthed the professional wrestling move "karate chop", which became synonymous with Rikidozan during his professional wrestling career.

Former Kyokushin Kaikan All Japan Champion Hatsuo Royama was practicing as an uchideshi of Nakamura when Royama was banned from Kyokushin. It is said that his legendary lower kick was learned during this period. Royama has written in his memoirs about times when practicing under Nakamura.

At the age of 61, when he suffered from laryngeal cancer, he refused to be treated by a doctor and heated a hook-shaped wire until it turned bright red. It was introduced in "The Soul of the Ring" that the burnt wire was used to groping for the cancer to be completely cured.

Manga artist Keisuke Itagaki interviewed Nakamura when Itagaki was starting the serialization of Baki the Grappler, and at that time he witnessed the technique of rafter cutting.

Nakamura had extremely little exposure to the media during his lifetime.

On April 22, 2015, North Korea's Korean Central News Agency reported that, "The remains of former Chongryon executives were enshrined in the Patriotic Martyrs' Cemetery. This includes the karateka Kang Chang-Soo, who is known as Hideo Nakamura."

It is speculated that Nakamura may have (knowingly or unknowingly) trained a Kyeok Sul Do instructor in Karate at Chongryon, who would have later returned to North Korea with the knowledge.

== Karate-do Kendokai ==
Karatedo Kendokai is a karate organization headquartered in Ikebukuro, Toshima-ku, Tokyo. It was founded by Hideo Nakamura in 1983 with the strong support of his disciples. Although it is a karate organization, Nakamura's motto, "There is no school in karate," does not call itself a school. The name "Kendo" (拳道, eng. fist way) was given to mean "to seek the essence of karate from the fist and complete the path of the fist." It has branches such as dojos and clubs in various places, and national competitions are also held.

It is known for its unique shape not found in the karate schools, and for "part training" in which a hard object such as a sandbag is attacked to train a fist. The art is full contact, except for stipulation that strikes to the face should be either semi-contact or no-contact. Momentary grappling, clinching, and throwing techniques are also permitted.

The founder, Nakamura, handed over the chairman to his high-ranking younger brother Kei Ishiyama in 1997, and was instructing the entire society as a general teacher until his death in 2013. Ishiyama, who was recognized by Nakamura as the 9th Dan of Kendokai Karatedo, is still in the chairmanship as of 2019.

Notable practitioners are

- Makoto Fujioka - A detective writer. Kendokai Ikebukuro Headquarters Dojo Juku Head.
- Yu Yagami - a Manga artist. 2011 25th National Championship Masters Kumite Division Winner.

== See also ==
- Rikidozan
- Hatsuo Royama
- Chongryon

== Notes ==
1.Rikidozan was born Kim Sin-rak (Korean: 김신락)
2.Hatsuo Royama was banned from the organization after getting into a physical altercation with Jan Kallenbach.
