= Full contact =

Full contact may refer to:

- Full-contact sport
- Full contact karate
- Full Contact (1992 film), a 1992 Hong Kong action film directed by Ringo Lam
- Full Contact (2015 film), a Dutch-Croatian film starring Grégoire Colin
- Full Contact (video game), a 1991 beat 'em up videogame for Amiga by Team17
- FullContact, a US-based technology company
