= An Myeong-jin =

North Korean agent and defector

- Born: 1968 (age 57–58); North Korea
- Disappeared: September 30, 2016 (aged 47–48); China
- Status: Missing for 9 years, 11 months and 29 days

Korean name
- Hangul: 안명진
- Hanja: 安明進
- RR: An Myeongjin
- MR: An Myŏngjin

An Myeong-jin (Korean: 안명진; 1968 – disappeared September 30, 2016) - alternatively Ahn Myung-jin - is a former North Korean agent and a defector.

After getting asylum in South Korea, he started working at the Agency for National Security Planning (currently the National Intelligence Service). Following his intelligence career, he acquired a position in Korea Gas Corporation. In late 2016, he disappeared in China and may have been killed by North Korean and/or Chinese intelligence operatives.

== Overview ==
In 1993, the Operations Department of the Central Committee of the Workers' Party of Korea ordered him to infiltrate South Korea. As a member of a special forces infiltrating South Korea, he deserted the unit while secretly acting in the demilitarized zone.

He surrendered to South Korean troops on the south side of the demilitarized zone and went into exile. After that, in 1997, he testified in Seoul that he saw Megumi Yokota, who was missing, at Kim Jong Il Political and Military University from September 1988 to early 1991. This statement was a major breakthrough and revealed that a series of Abek disappearances that occurred in 1978 and that the Japanese people who went missing while studying abroad in Europe had been abducted by North Korea. However, An Myeong-jin's statements raised some questions.

The reason for this is that when I was interviewed in the October 17, 1994 issue of AERA, I did not mention Megumi Yokota's abduction victims at all. In 2003, when Mr. and Mrs. Yokota, a family member of the abductees, spoke in a weekly magazine, they said, "Megumi Yokota lives as a Japanese tutor in the Kim Jong Il family." He commented on the North Korean military facility as if he knew the structure.

Kaoru Hasuike, one of the victims of the abduction, also said, "I have never met him in North Korea" in response to the testimony that "I saw him at the military university with 10 other Japanese people" ( July 29, 2005). In 2006 a Fuji TV program about the North-South separated family reunion event in June 2006, An Myeong-jin was mistakenly identified as a South Korean government (Ministry of Unification) employee who was attending a discrete person was a "northern agent in charge of surveillance."

In response to a protest from the Korean Ministry of Foreign Affairs, an incident occurred in which Fuji TV apologized. Since the abduction issue boiled in Japan in 2002, he quit his job. He began to live in Japan with the help of the "Saving Society" (a national council to rescue Japanese abducted by North Korea). Although he is a public corporation employee, he has almost no actual work, and is engaged in work related to North Korea (lectures on anti-North Korea promotion in various places) under the direction of the National Intelligence Service.

On July 9, 2007, he was arrested with a woman living with him for violating the "Narcotics Control Law" for smuggling North Korean stimulants obtained from a collaborator in China (Yonhap News Agency). An Myeong-jin pleads guilty. On August 17, a first instance sentenced to 4 years and 6 months in prison (3 years in prison). In the appeal decision on October 19, he was commuted to 3 years in prison and 5 years suspended sentence, and was released on the same day. Since the incident, he has not appeared in the Japanese media.

On September 30, 2016, Kazuhiro Araki, a professor at Takushoku University and the representative of the Investigation Commission on Missing Persons in Specified Disappearance, announced information that he had "already died in China".

== See also ==
- List of people who disappeared mysteriously: post-1970

== Notes ==
1."Why did you suddenly give Megumi Yokota's eyewitness testimony four years after she went into exile?", "Are you (Myeong-jin) saying that you have heard from a third party as if you had heard it?", "Isn't it representing the remarks of the asylum seekers who were higher up or the officials of the National Intelligence Service?"

== Books ==
- "30 former North Korean agents who have been kidnapped by North Koreans" << Chosun Ilbo >> Chinese version 2005 07 28
- "Impact of" Arrest of Anmei Susumu "" 2007 07 10 "THE JOURNAL"

== See also ==
- North Korean defectors
