= Tadashi Nakamura (martial artist) =

Japanese karateka

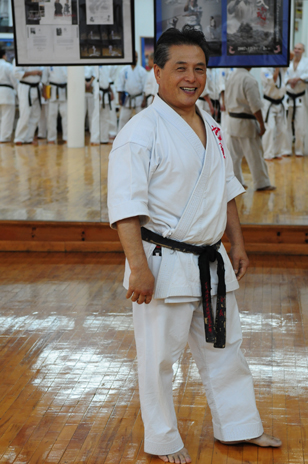
- Tadashi Nakamura at Honbu, 2009
- Born: February 22, 1942 (age 84)
- Style: Seidō juku Karate
- Teacher: Ōyama Masutatsu

Other information
- Website: www.seido.com

Tadashi Nakamura (中村 忠, Nakamura Tadashi; born February 22, 1942) is the founder and Kaicho (chairman) of World Seidō Karate Organization headquartered in New York City.

== Early years ==
Tadashi Nakamura was born on February 22, 1942, in the town of Maoka on the island of Karafuto. Nakamura trained in various martial arts including Goju-Ryu, Kendo, and Kyokushin. In 1956 he started studying with Mas Oyama (founder of the Kyokushin style of karate) and he had reached the rank of shodan (1st degree black belt) on May 6, 1962.

When he was 19 years old (1961) he made his first tournament appearance, the All-Japan Student Open Karate Championship, where he was placed first. In 1962, he took part in a match against a Muay Thai of the Lumpinee Boxing Stadium. The contest had been to determine which country had the 'best' martial art.

It was around this point in his life that Nakamura started passing his knowledge and experience onto others. Firstly at Camp Zama (a U.S. military base near Tokyo) from 1961 to 1965. He also coached the karate team for the Toho Medical University for three years. He also served as chief instructor at the Kyokushin Karate Honbu in Tokyo while earning his seventh dan.

== Kyokushin ==
On April 5, 1966, the head of Kyokushin Karate, Masutatsu Oyama, selected Nakamura to go to the US and spread the spirit of karate. Aged 24, he moved to New York City to begin teaching Kyokushin Karate. His first dojo was at the Brooklyn Academy of Music. Over the next 10 years he served as the American head of Kyokushin Karate. In 1971, he established the North American Kyokushin Karate headquarters on 14th Street in Manhattan.

As the Kyokushin style became more popular, Nakamura started to feel the quality of the instruction was slipping. He also began questioning the philosophy of his mentor Mas Oyama. In 1976, he respectfully withdrew from Kyokushin Karate, severed links with the Japanese Karate world and established his own style, Seidō juku.

== Seido ==
Seido means 'Sincere Way' and aims to develop students not just physically but also mentally, helping create 'complete' and 'balanced' individuals committed to improving themselves and the communities they live in.

Seido karate's three main principles are Love, Respect, and Obedience. Love for one's family and friends. Respect for your fellow karateka, your seniors, your parents and their knowledge and experience. Obedience (not subservience) to the laws and moral rules of life. Seido is headquartered in New York City, but has many branch dojos around the world.

An important part of the Seido World Seido Karate Organization is the Seido Juku Benefit Foundation which performs many good works for charity, including the annual benefit tournament. Nakamura has received praise and recognition from city, state, national and international leaders for the good works of the benefit foundation.

== Books and articles ==
Nakamura has authored several books and articles on Seido Karate, as well as related topics such as meditation, breathing, and teaching. Some of these include;

- One Day, One Lifetime (1995) (ISBN 0-8048-3064-9)
- The Human Face of Karate (1989) (ISBN 4-07-975055-2)
- Karate: Technique and Spirit (2001) (ISBN 0-8048-3282-X)
- Karate Kyohon (2001) (ISBN 4-07-231722-5)
