= Hatsuo Royama =

Zainichi Korean karateka (1948–2026)

- Born: Noh Cho-woong; March 31, 1948; Gyōda, Saitama Prefecture, Allied-occupied Japan
- Died: August 3, 2026 (aged 78)
- Style: Kyokushin, Yiquan, Kickboxing
- Teachers: Mas Oyama, Hideo Nakamura (Kang Chang-Soo), Kenichi Sawai
- Rank: 9th dan Kyokushin-kan Karate

Other information
- Website: https://www.kyokushinkan-intl.org/

Hatsuo Royama (盧山 初雄, Royama Hatsuo; March 31, 1948 – August 3, 2026) also known by his Korean name of Noh Cho Woong (Korean: 노초웅; Hanja: 盧初雄) was a master of Kyokushin Karate, was Kancho (Director) and then Kaicho (Honorary Director) of the Kyokushin-kan International Organization Honbu, one faction of the International Karate Organization (IKO) founded by Mas Oyama (1923–1994) until April 2022.

== Background ==
Hatsuo Royama was born in Yago, Gyoda City of the Saitama Prefecture. During the fall of his first year of high school in 1963, Royama was introduced to Oyama Karate Dojo, which would be renovated into the Kyokushin Shogakukai Foundation, under umbrella of Kyokushin-kaikan, in April 1964.

In 1967, after the dojo at Kyokushin headquarters was opened, Royama was appointed one of the headquarters instructors. However, Royama would be banned from the organization due to an incident involving a physical confrontation with Jan Kallenbach, in which Royama was beaten, and left the Kyokushin Kaikan for a while.

After that, he began kickboxing under the ring name Arashi Goro, and received training from Kenichi Sawai, a practitioner of Taikiken (Yiquan), who had a working relationship with Mas Oyama. He was later reintroduced to Karate when he began to study under Hideo Nakamura. During this time, he developed a good friendship with Nariharu Kuramoto.

In 1973, Royama's ban from Kyokushin was lifted, which allowed him to rejoin the organization. He then participated in the 5th Open Tournament All Japan Karatedo Championships for the first time after returning. After defeating Jōkō Ninomiya and Katsuaki Satō, Royama advanced to the finals, where his opponent was Terutomo Yamazaki. Royama achieved victory over Yamazaki with 4 to 1 decision.

In the 6th All Japan Championship in 1974, he lost to Takashi Azuma in the semi-finals and finished 3rd overall. Regardless of the defeat, Royama was elected as the representative of the 1st Open Tournament World Open Karate Championship the following year.

Royama remained in Japan while his teammates from the national karate team participated in the US expedition. Royama continued to practice in preparation for the 1st World Championship.

In the 1st World Open Karate Championships in 1975, he fought against Charles Martin (currently the most senior student in the United States of Tadashi Nakamura's Seido Juku), one of the American national team's players. In the quarterfinals, Royama defeated Charles in the first extension. In the final match, Royama fought against Katsuaki Satō. The battle was fierce and involved the extension again, but this time, Royama lost by 3-2 decision.

Royama participated in the 2nd World Championship in 1979 but withdrew in the 2nd round.

After battling illness since 2025, Royama's condition suddenly worsened, and he died on August 3, 2026, at the age of 78.

== Organizational director duties ==
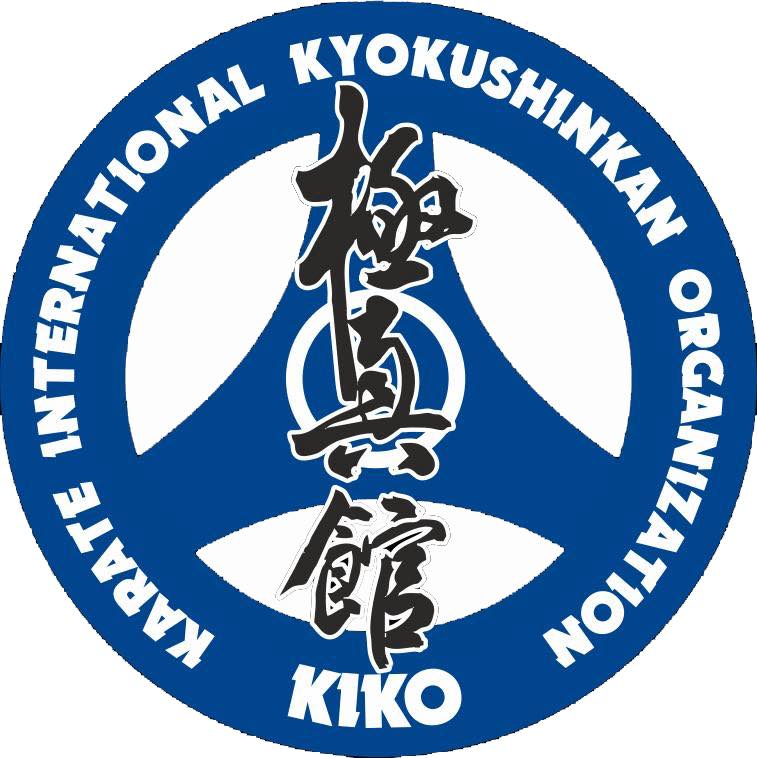
Kyokushin-Kan Official Symbol

In April 1994, after the death of Mas Oyama, a new system was established in which Shokei Matsui became the director and Royama became the chief advisor and chief instructor. In order to fulfill Oyama's will, Royama strongly wished for the revival of the foundation of Kyokushin, which had laid dormant due to the tradition of the original Kyokushin Karate going against the spread and development of karate. Royama tried to urge Matsui many times, but was not heard, as Matsui gradually commercialized the organization against Royama's will.

Royama eventually grew fed up with Matsui's direction and left Matsui's Kyokushin organization with Hiroto Okazaki (currently Kancho of Kyokushin-Kan International) and others. In December 2002, Royama established the Kyokushin-kan International Honbu, which was to follow Kyokushin's original spirit which Oyama's envisioned, and became the organization's first director. After that, Royama revived the Kyokushin Shogakukai Foundation, which was a public interest incorporated foundation, for the purpose of popularizing and developing Kyokushin Karate. In April 2004, the Kyokushin Shogakukai Foundation awarded him the 9th dan of the Kyokushin.

With the reform of the new public interest incorporated foundation under the jurisdiction of the Cabinet Office, which came into effect on April 10, 2014, from December 2008, the Kyokushin Shogakukai Foundation has been registered as a general incorporated foundation.

At the Mas Oyama's 23rd memorial service, held on April 23, 2016, at Gokokuji Temple, Royama, who attended, stated his greatest desire was to "pass on the martial arts spirit learned from the [Mas Oyama] to future generations."

On January 20, 2017, it was announced on the official website that the Kyokushinkan-related trademark was announced as a public property by the Kanto Shinetsu National Taxation Bureau. On February 7, the same year, with the withdrawal of the deputy director and several branch managers, Royama declared that he would work under the new system with the mission of continuing the will of President Oyama.

== Fighting style ==
During his active career, he used Gedan mawashi geri, crescent kicks and fist thrusts as his main weapons. His use of low roundhouse kicks earned him the nickname "Low Kick Royama".

== Tournament history ==
- 5th Open Tournament All Japan Karatedo Championships (1973) - Winner (defeated Terutomo Yamazaki by decision)
- 6th All Japan Karatedo Championship (1974) - 3rd place (lost to Takashi Azuma)
- 1st Open Tournament World Open Karate Championship (1975) - 2nd Place (lost to Katsuaki Satō by decision)
- 2nd World Open Karate Championship (1979) - Advanced to the 2nd round before withdrawing from competition

== Books ==
- Lifelong Karate-do: In Search of True Strength (Sports Life, 1980)
- New Lifelong Karate-do (Critique, 1996)
- My Martial Arts Karate (Gakken 1996)
- Recommendation of Martial Arts (Kitensha 1997)
- What is Karate: My Lifelong Karate-do (Kitensha 1998)
- Daily Study: Kyokushin Karate Kyokushin (Kyokushin 2000)
- Actual Battle Secrets: Hatsuo Royama's Karate Secrets (Kitensha 2001)
- The Royal Road to Live in the Truest (co-authored by Tsuyoshi Hiroshige, Chikuma Shubansha, 2004)
- Dawn of Shin-Oyama Dojo Gokushinkan (co-authored by Tsuyoshi Hiroshige, Sakuranohana Publishing, 2003)
- Living in the Royal Road: Recommendation of the New Samurai Road (co-authored by Tsuyoshi Hiroshige, Chikuma Shubansha, 2004)
- Karate-do Learned From Molds of Karate-do (Kitensha 2005)
- Introduction to Kyokushin Hand Practice (Oizumi Shoten, 2007)
- Introduction to Junior Kyokushin Kyokushin-Kyokushin Kyokushin Strengthens the Mind and Body (Natsumesha 2007)

== Film appearances ==
- Kenka karate gokushin-ken (a.k.a. Champion of Death) (1975, Tōei) - as himself
- Chijōsaikyōnokarate shiri - as himself

== Honors ==
- In 2024, Kaicho Hatsuo Royama was awarded the Life time Achievement Award by Black Belt magazine.
