= Alejandro Navarro (karateka) =

Spanish Full Contact Karateka

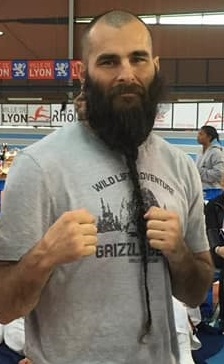
- Navarro 2017
- Born: September 15, 1976 (age 50); Fuerteventura, Canary Islands
- Nationality: Spain
- Height: 180 cm (5 ft 11 in)
- Weight: 87–92 kg
- Division: Super Heavyweight (2011–2019); Heavyweight (2003–2009, 2013, 2021); Middleweight (1996–2002)
- Style: Kyokushin, Kickboxing
- Rank: 3. dan Black
- Years active: 1996 - present

Alejandro Navarro (born 15 September 1976 in Gran Canaria, Canary Islands) is a Spanish Full-contact Karateka. He is a 17-time Kyokushin European Champion, of which Navarro has won the Open Championship nine times. He has also once won the 2013 World Cup.

== Biography ==
Navarro was born in Gran Canaria, where he began to practice martial arts such as taekwondo and Hapkido. Since then, at the age of 16, Navarro visited his relatives at Fuerteventura, where he became interested in Kyokushin karate. Four years later, after turning 20, Navarro moved to Fuerteventura to practice Kyokushin.

Navarro is also a long-time kickboxing enthusiast and had ambitions to pursue a K-1 career. However, Navarro is known for his long braided beard, which under K-1 terms he would have had to cut to be allowed to compete. However, Navarro refused and his career in kickboxing is still open.

== Competition career ==
Navarro finished sixth in the second Open Series of the 2002 European Championships. He also won the Polish championship in the under-80 kg series that same year. Two years later, he was sixth in the same competition, which was also held in Poland.

Navarro won his first medal at the Kyokushin European Championships in 2005. At that time, he won bronze in the under-90 kg series. In November of the same year, Navarro advanced to the finals of the European Championship Open, where he lost to Krzysztof Habraszka. Navarro won the European Championship bronze medal at the "Under 90 Kg Weight Class" in his homeland in Spain in May 2006.

=== European Champion (2006-2009) ===
Navarro won his first European Championship in late 2006 in Italy. He fought in the open weight class, where Navarro defeated Piotr Banasik in the finals.

In May 2007, Navarro won his third European Championship bronze medal in Greece. Navarro won the second European Championship after defeating Lucian Gogonel in the finals.

In 2008 Navarro won two European Championships, the first of which he won at his home race in Spain in May. Navarro defeated Lucian Gogonel in the finals. The duo also faced off in the finals of the European Championships in Bulgaria at the end of the year.

2009 Navarro continued its success after winning two European championships in a year for the second time in a row. He also won silver at the World Championships and silver at the Japanese Championships. Navarro started the year by winning silver at the World Championships in April in the "under 90kg" series. He lost to the previous year's champion Kentaro Tanaka in the finals.

In May, Navarro advanced for the second time in a row in the European Championships to the finals, where he faced Lucian Gogonel again. Navarro won the championship for the second time in a row in the under-90 series. It was also his Fifth European Championship. Towards the end of the year, Navarro won silver at the Japan Championships, where he lost to Kentaro Tanaka like the World Championships. Navarro ended his year by winning the European Championship in France. He defeated his compatriot Pablo Estensoro in the finals.

=== European-Japanese and World Championships (2011-2013) ===
Navarro's European Championship tube ends in Serbia in 2010. He advanced to the final of the European Championships in the Open, where he lost to Nicolae Stoian. Later in November, Navarro also won the European Open Championship when he won the final Zahari Damjanov.

In 2012, Navarro did not win a medal in the European competitions, but instead achieved success in Japan after winning the Japanese Championship and bronze at the All American Open. In Japan, Navarro defeated Goderzi Kapanadze in the finals.

2013 was a more successful year for Navarro when he won the World Heavyweight Championship in Tokyo in April. Navarro defeated Shohei Kamada (karateka) in the finals. In May, Navarro also advanced to the finals of the European Championships, where he lost to Zahari Damjanov.

In the summer, Navarro won his second bronze at the All American Open, and in November, he advanced to the final for the second time in a row at the Japanese Championships, but lost to Ajima Kyohei. At Christmas, Navarro won his second European Championship in France in the Open, defeating Sergey Uvitskiy in the finals.

=== Return to European Championship and Super Heavy Series (2014-2017) ===
In May 2014, Navarro won the European Championship bronze medal in the super heavyweight series after winning the Patryk Sypień medal. In the summer, he finished fifth in the All American Open.

In March 2015, Navarro won the Lyon Open, where he faced Djema Belkhodja in the finals. In May, he achieved the tenth European Championship of his career after winning the previous year's champion Zahari Damjanov in the final. Navarro also won bronze in the European team at the World Championships. Navarro won bronze in the Seiken Cup in Russia in 2016 after beating Artem Lyalikov in the medal battle.

In the weightlifting European Championships, he was left without medals, but won his career in the open weight class at the end of the eleventh European Championship. He defeated Andrei Luzin in the final. Navarro was invited to take part in the 2017 World Cup, where he faced the American Sota Nakano in the first round. Navarro lost the fight and fell from the competition. In May, Navarro won his fifth European Championship bronze medal after defeating Goderzi Kapanadze. In June, Navarro took part in the All American Open, where he advanced until the final. Navarro advanced straight to the second round and was faced with Ilya Polyakov, which he also won. In the third round, Navarro was met by another Russian, Aleksandr Bedshvil, whom he also managed to beat. In the semifinals, Navarro defeated Japan's Takehiro Kaga and advanced to the finals, where he lost to France's Antonio Tusseau.

Towards the end of the year, Navarro still won the European Championship silver in the open series after losing in the finals to Konstantin Kovalenko, for which he also lost the final place in the May European Championships.

=== Moving to Russia and the European Championship (2018 -) ===
Navarro had trained previously in the Mad Max dojo in Russia, but after getting married, Navarro decided to move to Russia to teach Karate in Khabarovsk. In May, Navarro took the European Championship bronze after defeating Andrzej Winiarska. In June, he won the All American Open for the first time. In the finals, he faced the multiple U.S. champion Daniel Milicevic. Navarro won the 8th European Open Championship, defeating Dzmitryi Varabei in the finals.

Navarro won the European Championship silver in the heavyweight series in May 2019 after losing to Andrei Luzin in the final. Since then, in November, he was again involved in Kyokushin's biggest tournament at the World Open, where he advanced to the top 32. Navarro tournament fell short after losing to Yuta Takahashi, who finished fourth.

Navarro made history by winning the European Heavyweight Championship at the age of 45. After beating Alexei Fedoseev in the finals, he also became tied with most heavyweight championships with Lucian Gogonel.

After the tournament, he was still in the Open Baltic Cup in December, where he finished sixth. Navarro lost his last match to Andrei Luzin after two extra innings. Regardless, Navarro was awarded the trophy of "best fighting spirit" in the tournament.

== Kickboxing ==
Navarro fought two matches in kickboxing in 2004 and 2005. The matches organized by IchiGeki and took place in Japan, in which the rules of fights varied. The first match was fought on K-1 rules, with Navarro facing Taichi Furuta. Navarro won the match in the first set with a technical knockout. In his second match, Navarro faced Sergey Precakinov, and the fight who followed more of Kyokushin rules. Navarro lost by three-vote decision in the match.

== Private life ==
Navarro has been married to Ksenija Zasorina. The couple married in Khabarovsk, Russia, on April 14, 2018.

== Kickboxing records ==
Result	Record	Opponent	Method	Event	Date	Round	Time	Note(s)
Loss	1–1	Sergey Precakinov	Decision (unanimous)	3.19 Ichigeki	19.3.2005	3	2:00	Kyokushin rules
Win	1–0	Taichi Furuta	TKO	Ichigeki Kyokushin vs K-1 All Out Battle	30.5.2004	1	2:15	
