= Jan Soukup =

Czech karateka

- Born: September 17, 1979 (age 47); Prague, Bohemia, Czechoslovakia (now Czech Republic)
- Other names: Czech Samurai
- Nationality: (Czech Republic) Czech
- Height: 1.85 m (6 ft 1 in)
- Weight: 100.0 kg (220.5 lb; 15.75 st)
- Division: Heavyweight
- Style: Kyokushin Karate
- Stance: Orthodox
- Fighting out of: Tokyo, Japan; Prague, Czech Republic
- Team: Ichigeki Academy; Lanna Gym; Kakutogi Academy
- Trainer: Jayson Vemoa
- Rank: 2nd degree black belt in Kyokushin; Branch Chief for International Karate Organization World Kyokushin Kaikan in Czech Republic; President of the Czech Karate Kyokushinkai Association; Vice President of the Czech Fullcontact Karate Organization
- Years active: 2001-2011, 2014-2019

Kickboxing record
- Total: 22
- Wins: 15
- By knockout: 5
- Losses: 7
- By knockout: 2
- Draws: 0
- Last updated on: November 23, 2011

Jan Soukup
Medal record

Representing Czech Republic

Men's Kyokushin

All-Japan Championships
Gold medal – first place	Tokyo 2004	+90 kg

European Championships
Bronze medal – third place	Uzhhorod 2003	+90 kg
Silver medal – second place	Varna 2005	+90 kg
Gold medal – first place	Volos 2007	+90 kg

European Open
Bronze medal – third place	Belgrade 2005	Open

World Open
Silver medal – second place	Tokyo 2007	Open

Jan Soukup (born September 17, 1979) is a Czech karateka, the branch chief for International Karate Organization World Kyokushin Kaikan in Czech Republic, the president of the Czech Karate Kyokushinkai Association and the vice president of the Czech Fullcontact Karate Organization, and also a retired kickboxer who competed in the heavyweight division. Soukup's first noteworthy accomplishment was a third-place finish at the European Kyokushin Championships in 2003 and he followed this by winning the All-Japan Kyokushin Championships the next year. After finishing as runner-up in the European Championships and in third place in the European Open in 2005, Soukup had his most successful year in 2007 when he won the European Championships and lost to Ewerton Teixeira in the final of the 9th Kyokushin World Open. Beginning in 2008, he embarked on a career in kickboxing which included a stint in K-1.

== Career ==
=== Karate career (2001–2007) ===
Jan Soukup began his karate training in Shotokan at the age of eleven before moving to Kagoshima, Japan in April 2001 to study Kyokushin in an uchi-deshi program. After training for four years and attaining the rank of second dan black belt, which he earned by completing a twenty-man kumite among other tests, he returned to the Czech Republic and opened his own Kyokushin dojo in August 2005.

During this period, Soukup also achieved respectable finishes in numerous tournaments; in 2003, he finished in third place in the +90 kg/198 lb division at the 17th European Kyokushin Championships, in 2004 he won the 21st All-Japan Kyokushin Championships at +90 kg/198 lb and 2005 saw him take bronze at the 5th Kyokushin European Open and silver at the 21st European Kyokushin Championships.

Soukup had his most successful year in 2007 when he won the 21st European Kyokushin Championships at +90 kg/198 lb and finished as runner-up in the 9th edition of most prestigious tournament in the sport, the Kyokushin World Open. He avenged his loss to Arthur Hovhannisyan, who beat him in the final of the European Championships back in 2005, in the semi-finals before losing out to Ewerton Teixeira via low kick ippon in the final.

=== Transition to kickboxing (2008-2019) ===
Making the transition to professional kickboxing, Jan Soukup debuted in his native Czech Republic in 2008 with a first round knockout of Tonda Ungerman. Following this, he was recruited by K-1 and returned to Japan to train under Jayson Vemoa at the Ichigeki Academy where his sparring partners included Glaube Feitosa, Takumi Sato and former foe Ewerton Teixeira.

In his first K-1 match, Soukup faced reigning K-1 Heavyweight Champion Keijiro Maeda in non-title bout at the K-1 World Grand Prix 2009 in Tokyo Final 16 Qualifying GP in Tokyo, Japan on August 11, 2009. He was dropped with a short right hand towards the end of round two before being knocked out with a right hook in three.

After rebounding with a unanimous decision win over Espedito da Silva at Ichigeki Brazil 2009 in São Paulo, Brazil on October 3, 2009, he returned to K-1 to fight Tsutomu Takahagi in a non-tournament match at the K-1 World Grand Prix 2009 Final in Yokohama, Japan on December 5, 2009, and won by a second consecutive unanimous decision. In his third and final outing in the promotion, Soukup lost to Mladen Brestovac by way of unanimous decision after being knocked down with a third round knee strike in the tournament reserve match at the K-1 World Grand Prix 2010 in Bucharest in Romania on May 21, 2010.

Soukup lost his second fight in a row when he dropped a unanimous decision to Jhonata Diniz after surviving knockdowns in rounds one and three at Ichigeki Brazil 2010 in São Paulo on July 31, 2010.

After over a year out of the ring, Soukup made his comeback to enter the RISE Heavyweight Tournament 2011 held at RISE 85 in Tokyo on November 23, 2011. He had a close fight with Fabiano Cyclone in the quarter-finals but scoring a knockdown in round two was enough to earn him the nod via majority decision and advance to the semis where he faced Makoto Uehara. This was another closely contested affair and was called a majority draw after the regulation three rounds. With the fight going to an extension round to decide the winner, Uehara did enough to take a unanimous decision and eliminate Soukup from the tournament.

== Championships and awards ==
=== Kickboxing ===
- 2014 Yangame's Fight Night Heavyweight Tournament Champion +94,1 kg

=== Karate ===
==== Kyokushin ====
- All-Japan Kyokushin Championships
  - 21st All-Japan Kyokushin Championships +90 kg/198 lb Champion (gold)
- European Kyokushin Championships
  - 17th European Kyokushin Championships +90 kg/198 lb 3rd Place (bronze)
  - 19th European Kyokushin Championships +90 kg/198 lb Runner-up (silver) (lost to Artur Hovhannisyan)
  - 21st European Kyokushin Championships +90 kg/198 lb Champion (gold) (Defeated Petar Martinov)
- Kyokushin European Open
  - 5th Kyokushin European Open 3rd Place (bronze)
- Kyokushin World Open
  - 9th Kyokushin World Open Runner-up (silver) (lost to Ewerton Teixeira)

==== Shotokan Karate ====
- Shotokan Karate Bohemia Cup
  - Shotokan Karate Bohemia Cup 2000 (Prague Team) 3rd Place (bronze)
- Shotokan Karate Scandinavia Cup
  - Shotokan Karate Scandinavia Cup 1999 3rd Place (bronze)
- Shotokan Karate World Cup
  - Shotokan Karate World Cup 1999 (-Mladá Boleslav) Champion (gold)

== Kickboxing record ==
Kickboxing record
15 wins (5 KO), 8 losses, 0 draws
Date	Result	Opponent	Event	Location	Method	Round	Time	Record
2019-11-01	Win	(Russia) Timur Gastashev	Battle of Champions 11	Moscow, Russia	Decision (Unanimous)	4	3:00	15-8
2019-03-29	Loss	(Azerbaijan) Bahram Rajabzadeh	XFN LEGENDS	Prague, Czech Republic	KO (Right cross)	2	0:18	14-8
2018-07-26	Win	(Netherlands) Peter Aerts	Yangames 6	Prague, The Czech Republic	Decision (Unanimous)	3	3:00	14-7
2018-04-19	Loss	(China) Hao Guanghua	XFN: Czechia vs China	Prague, The Czech Republic	Decision (Unanimous)	3	3:00	13-7
2016-10-08	Loss	(France) Freddy Kemayo	W5 Grand Prix "Legends in Prague"	Prague, The Czech Republic	KO	3		13-6
2015-12-19	Win	(Suriname) Donegi Abena	Večer Bojovníků Thajského Boxu VII.	Liberec, Czech Republic	Decision (Unanimous)	3	3:00	13-5
2015-11-07	Win	(Czech Republic) Georgi Fibich	Night Of Warriors 8	Liberec, Czech Republic	Decision (Unanimous)	3	3:00	12-5
2015-09-26	Loss	(Czech Republic) Ondrej Hutnik	Mistroství ČR v K1 WAKO pro	Prague, Czech Republic	Decision (unanimous)	3	3:00	11-5
2015-07-30	Win	(Czech Republic) Luboš Raušer	Yangame's Fight Night 3	Prague, Czech Republic	Decision (Unanimous)	3	3:00	11-4
2015-05-30	Win	(Croatia) Toni Milanović	Obračun u Ringu 13	Split, Croatia	Decision (Unanimous)	3	3:00	10-4
2015-04-25	Win	(Croatia) Mario Jagatić	Night Of Warriors 7	Liberec, Czech Republic	Decision (Unanimous)	3	3:00	9-4
2014-12-11	Win	(France) Faycal Hucin	Noc Válečníků	Kladno, Czech Republic	Ext. R. Decision	4	3:00	8-4
2014-07-31	Win	(Slovakia) Radovan Kulla	Yangame's Fight Night, Final Fight	Prague, Bohemia, Czech Republic	KO (low kicks)	1		7-4
Wins Yangame's Fight Night Heavyweight Tournament Championship +94,1 kg.
2014-07-31	Win	(Czech Republic) Jiří Havránek	Yangame's Fight Night, Semi Finals	Prague, Bohemia, Czech Republic	KO (spinning hook kick)	1		6-4
2014-07-31	Win	(Slovakia) Peter Baláž	Yangame's Fight Night, Quarter Finals	Prague, Bohemia, Czech Republic	KO (high kick)	1		5-4
2011-11-23	Loss	(Japan) Makoto Uehara	RISE 85: RISE Heavyweight Tournament 2011, Semi Finals	Tokyo, Japan	Extension round decision (unanimous)	4	3:00	4-4
2011-11-23	Win	(Brazil) Fabiano Cyclone	RISE 85: RISE Heavyweight Tournament 2011, Quarter Finals	Tokyo, Japan	Decision (majority)	3	3:00	4-3
2010-07-31	Loss	(Brazil) Jhonata Diniz	Ichigeki Brazil 2010	São Paulo, Brazil	Decision (unanimous)	3	3:00	3-3
2010-05-21	Loss	(Croatia) Mladen Brestovac	K-1 World Grand Prix 2010 in Bucharest, Reserve Match	Bucharest, Romania	Decision (unanimous)	3	3:00	3-2
2009-12-05	Win	(Japan) Tsutomu Takahagi	K-1 World Grand Prix 2009 Final	Yokohama, Japan	Decision (unanimous)	3	3:00	3-1
2009-10-03	Win	(Brazil) Espedito da Silva	Ichigeki Brazil 2009	São Paulo, Brazil	Decision (unanimous)	3	3:00	2-1
2009-08-11	Loss	(Japan) Keijiro Maeda	K-1 World Grand Prix 2009 in Tokyo Final 16 Qualifying GP	Tokyo, Japan	KO (right hook)	3	1:20	1-1
2008-04-19	Win	(Czech Republic) Antonín Ungerman	Galavečer Bojovníků 2008	Mladá Boleslav, Bohemia, Czech Republic	KO (left hook)	1	1:22	1-0
Legend: Win Loss Draw/No contest Notes
