= Kenji Midori =

Japanese martial artist

- Born: April 18, 1962 (age 64); Amami Ōshima, Japan
- Native name: 緑健児
- Style: Shinkyokushinkai Karate
- Teachers: Mas Oyama, Tsuyoshi Hiroshige
- Rank: 8th dan karate

Kenji Midori (緑 健児, Midori Kenji; born April 18, 1962) is a Japanese martial artist and an instructor of the Full-contact Karate. He has an 8th Dan black belt in World Karate Organization Shinkyokushinkai.

== Career ==
Midori was a student of Mas Oyama, the founder of Kyokushin kaikan. He lost in the 4th World Tournament to British Michael Thompson. After the 4th World Tournament, Midori went on to claim his third All Japan Weight title and reached the final of the All Japan Tournament. Four years later, Midori entered the 5th World Tournament, where he defeated the reigning All Japan Champion Akira Masuda to become the 5th Kyokushin Karate World Champion.

After the death of Masutatsu Oyama, the founder of Kyokushin Karate, the International Karate Organization (IKO) initially broke into three groups, one of which is known as IKO-2, initially led by Yukio Nishida. After Nishida resigned, he was succeeded by Keiji Sanpei, who was in turn succeeded by Yasuhiro Shichinohe and then eventually Kenji Midori. Under Midoris leadership the organization formally changed its name to NPO (Non-Profit Organization) World Karate Organization (WKO) Shinkyokushinkai in 2003. Today, Midori holds the position of Daihyo (President) of the WKO Shinkyokushinkai (新極真会).

== Tournament achievements ==
- 5th Kyokushin Karate World Tournament 1991 – Champion
- 4th Kyokushin Karate World Tournament 1987 – Last 16 (lost to Michael Thompson)
- 22nd All Japan Tournament 1990 – 2nd place
- 17th All Japan Tournament 1985 – 5th place
- 7th All Japan Weight Tournament 1990 – Champion
- 4th All Japan Weight Tournament 1987 – Champion
- 2nd All Japan Weight Tournament 1985 – Champion
- Sursee Cup 1988 – 2nd place (lost to Andy Hug)
