= Arthur Hovhannisyan (karateka) =

Russian karateka

- Born: September 13, 1975 (age 51); Gyumri, Armenian SSR, Soviet Union
- Native name: Արթուր Հովհաննիսյան; Артур Оганесян
- Other names: Highlander
- Nationality: (Armenia) Armenian (Russia) Russian
- Height: 1.85 m (6 ft 1 in)
- Weight: 100 kg (220 lb; 16 st)
- Division: Heavyweight
- Style: Kyokushin Karate
- Stance: Orthodox
- Rank: 5th degree black belt in Kyokushin
- Years active: 1990–present

Arthur Hovhannisyan (Armenian: Արթուր Հովհաննիսյան, Russian: Артур Оганесян) is an Armenian-Russian Kyokushin karateka (5th dan).

Hovhannisyan began competing in swimming and boxing at age of eight before beginning kyokushin at fifteen. He won both the Moscow and the Armenian championships in 1995, the Russian championship in 1996, the British National Open Tournament in 1997, and the European Championship in 2005. He has been vice-president of Kyokushinkai Federation of Armenia since 1999. In 2005, he moved to the International Karate Organization (IKO) headquarters in Tokyo.

In 2008, Russian TV channel Боец ("Fighter", boets.ru) made a film about Hovhannisyan, entitled Горец ("Highlander", Hovhannisyan's nickname referring to his Armenian heritage).

In 2009, he completed a 100-man kumite under the supervision of Shokei Matsui.
