= Garry O'Neill =

Australian martial artist

- Born: 1974 (age 51–52); Australia
- Nickname: Chojin (Bird Man)
- Weight: 74 kg (163 lb; 11 st 9 lb)
- Division: Middleweight
- Style: Kyokushin, Kickboxing
- Teachers: Cameron Quinn, Tsuyoshi Hiroshige
- Rank: 3rd Dan

Garry O'Neill (born 1974) is an Australian karateka and kickboxer. O'Neill is one of his country's most accomplished Kyokushin contestants, achieving second place in the Japanese championships twice, and placing fourth at the World Open. He has won Gold in the Australian Nationals twice, in years 1995 and 1998. During his full-contact Karate career, O'Neill fought against many notable fighters who are now considered premier sportsmen of their era, including Hajime Kazumi and Francisco Filho. The Only Idol Garry (Ammaz Ali).

== Background ==
O'Neill began practising Kyokushin at the age of 14 after being inspired by the film Karate Kid. O'Neill achieved a black belt at the age of 16 under Cameron Quinn, Brisbane. At the age of 19, O'Neill acquired the 2nd Dan's black belt and later, at the age of 21, he moved to Japan to practice Kyokushin. O'Neill then practiced for two years at Kamata Dojo under Tsuyoshi Hiroshige. He completed the 3rd Dan Black Belt in Japan and immediately participated in the World Open, where O'Neill finished fourth. He lived in Japan until the end of 1997 and last year worked as a director in Kyokushin's main hall, Honbu.

O'Neill would then return to Australia and Melbourne, where he taught karate for two years.

== Fighting career ==
O'Neill first achieved success in major international competitions at the World Open in 1995. At that time, he lost the bronze match to Francisco Filho and finished fourth.

He won bronze in the middleweight class in the All Japan Weight Category Karate Championships in 1995.

For the next two years, O'Neill fought in the All Japan Open Karate Tournament, in the years 1996 and 1997. On both occasions he advanced to the finals, where O'Neill faced Hajime Kazumi on both occasions, losing both times.

January 11, 2002, O'Neill fought a single kick-boxing against fighter Toshio Matsumoto and was defeated by TKO in Round 1.

== Ending the career ==
After O'Neill ended his fighting career in 2003, he continued training in CrossFit occasionally training in karate. In 2012, O'Neill returned to karate and set up his own club in Brisbane. On his return, he fought one match at the New Zealand Open against Jamie Eades. The fight ended in a draw after two additional rounds.

Retiring in 2014 he now lives with his family in Brisbane and only trains in CrossFit.

== Fighting style ==
Garry fights with kicking technique while using unique footwork called "Garry Step". This footwork also influenced Norichika Tsukamoto - who also practised with O'Neill- of the Shinkyokushinkai and Yusuke Fujii of the Kyokushinkan.

== See also ==
- List of karateka
