= Boxing training =

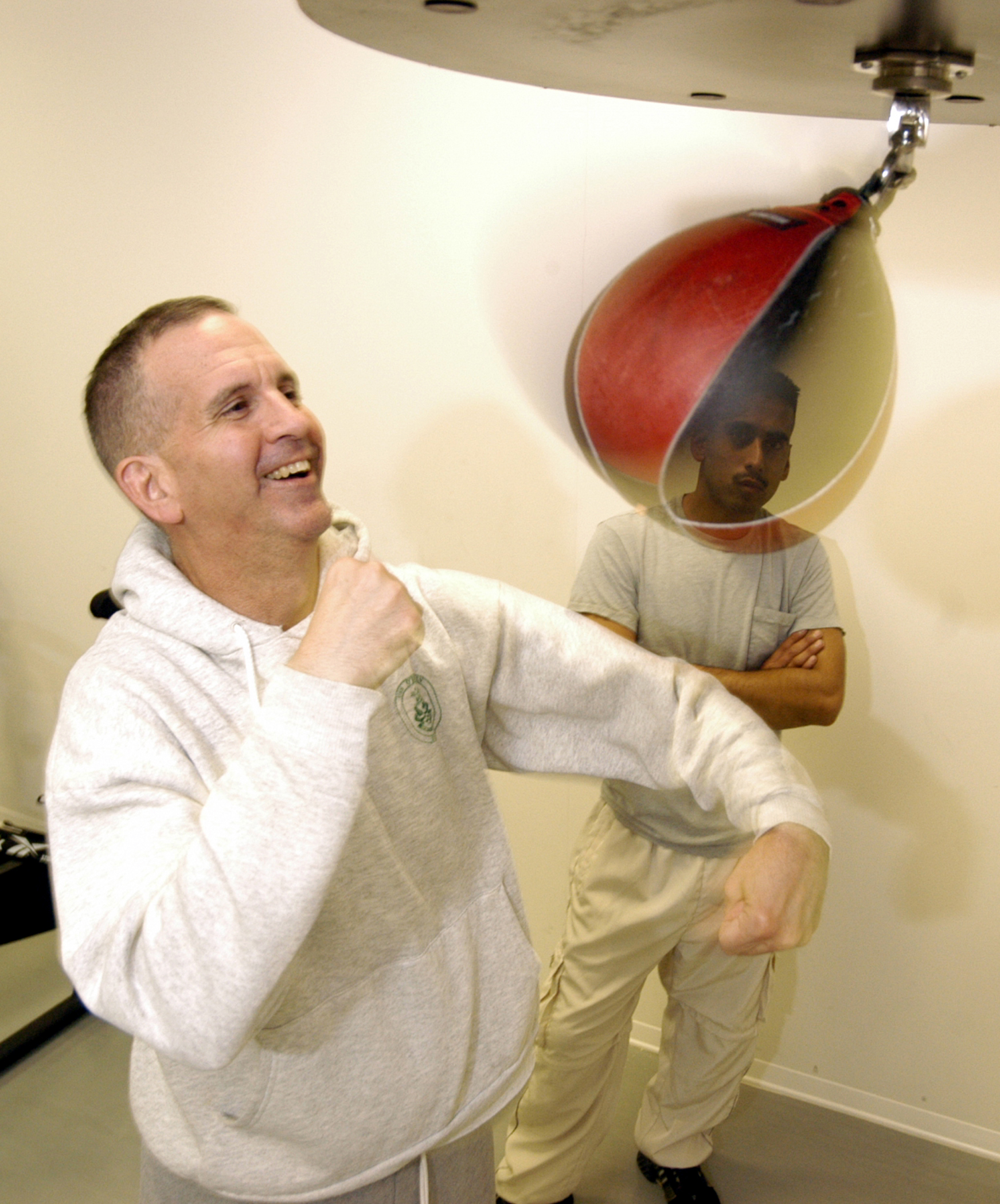
Lt. Cmdr. Philip Creider (US Navy), demonstrates the use of a Speed bag, a tool prominently used in training for boxing.

Boxing training is the training method that boxers use in order to improve their boxing skills and physical ability.

== Training ==
A boxer's training depends largely on the point in their career at which they are situated. If the boxer is just a beginner, a minimal training routine might consist of learning how to hit a heavy bag, a speed bag, or a double end bag (a small bag with a cord on top and bottom connecting it to the floor and ceiling) as well as doing shadowboxing in front of a mirror, skipping rope, calisthenics and jogging every day, as well as an occasional practice bout inside the ring (sparring). Most beginning boxers will spend most of their early careers conditioning and establishing the fundamentals. For the amateur or professional boxer preparing for a competition or bout, however, training is much more stringent. Boxing is widely considered one of the most physically demanding sports in the world.

=== Weight ===
Boxing, like several other fighting sports, categorizes its competitors into weight classes. Some fighters try to take advantage of this by dieting before weigh-in so that they can be bumped down a weight class. In extreme cases, a fighter may forgo solid food before the official weigh-in ceremony, and eat a lot afterward to compensate. In some very extreme cases, boxers have been forced to stop eating solid food up to three days before the weigh-in ceremony, in order to make weight for the fight. Sometimes, if a boxer doesn't make the weight agreed for on the first weight-in, they might go to a sauna or to jog with a jacket to sweat and lose the extra pounds, however this is mainly water that the body holds. After weigh-ins, competitors will in general add on weight before the fight, resulting in them weighing anywhere from 5 to 25 lbs above the weight class.

A boxer will generally try to have the maximum weight possible within the Boxing weight classes they are fighting in, as a good boxer will be able to use their weight to their advantage.

=== Sparring ===
Sparring is "practice fighting" with the aim of training skills and fitness, not to determine a winner. Sparring should always involve use of a mouth-guard, head-guard and groin-guard. Sparring gloves are often more padded than gloves used in actual bouts. Sparring partners sometimes agree to practice particular types of punches or defense moves to focus their training.

== Equipment ==
Basic boxing training equipment includes:

=== Safety Equipment ===
- Hand wraps: Protect the knuckles and wrists when training and sparring.
- Speed Bag Gloves: Created to prevent the hands from getting hurt while hitting the speed bag, these gloves are the lightest gloves, yet offer more protection than hand wraps alone.
- Heavy Bag Gloves: Created to prevent the hands from getting hurt while hitting the heavy bag, and are insulated for your knuckles to reducing the risk of wrist, hand, and knuckle injury while hitting the Heavy bag. Normally bag gloves weigh anywhere from 10–12 ounces (280–340 g), but some prefer to train in both the 14–16-ounce (400–450 g) varieties.
- Sparring Gloves: Contrary to popular belief, these gloves were designed to protect the boxer's hands, not the opponent's head. Generally weigh much more than professional fight gloves (16 oz.) in order to cushion blows and accustom boxers to added weights.
- Headgear: Used to protect boxers from soft tissue damage, (bruises, cuts, etc.), during sparring - also used in competition in amateur boxing. Headgear offers no protection from the effects of hard punches (stunning, knockdowns, KOs). It is important that boxers are aware of this otherwise headgear can produce a false sense of security leading a boxer to take punches rather than defend themselves.
- Groin Guard (or No-Foul Protector): Protects the groin against low punches, offers more comprehensive protection than a simple 'cup' guard.
- Mouthpiece: (Sometimes known as gumshield, mouthguard). Used to protect the inside of the mouth and lips from getting cut by the teeth when a hard punch to the face is received. The mouthguard also helps to lock the top and bottom jaws together preventing painful damage to the jaw joint capsule when a boxer is struck by a hook. Important that it is worn in both sparring and its tough competition.

=== Training Equipment ===
- Jump Rope or Skipping rope: It is used to improve footwork and agility, and for aerobic fitness. also helps maintain stamina
- Focus mitts: Padded targets worn on the trainer's hands for the boxer to strike and practice combinations.
- The Heavy Bag: Used to teach young boxers where exactly to hit an opponent and for all kinds of boxers to practice their combinations.
- The Speed Bag: Used to improve hand speed, hand-eye coordination and shoulder endurance.
- The Double End Bag: Also known as the floor-ceiling bag, crazy bag, or the reflex bag, the double end bag is hooked up by two thin elastic ropes to the gym's ceiling and floor, and because of that, it moves around easily, giving the boxer good equipment for target practice and timing.
- The Maize Bag: Used to practice head movement and close-range combinations, such as uppercut/hook combinations.
- The Slam Man: Used to practice combinations of punches on a human shaped bag
- Medicine Ball: Used for plyometric training - often used when training in pairs (quick throwing/passing of the ball) or with a trainer.
- Mirror: Used by boxers to do shadow boxing.
- Boxing ring: When boxers are training, used to stage practice or competition bouts.
- Automated Boxing Scoring System: The first use of technology in boxing for training purposes. Monitors the boxers in real-time recording information on each blow.

== See also ==
- Boxercise
- Sports training
- Aliveness (martial arts)
- Combat sport
- Punching bag
