= Shadowboxing =

Sports training exercise

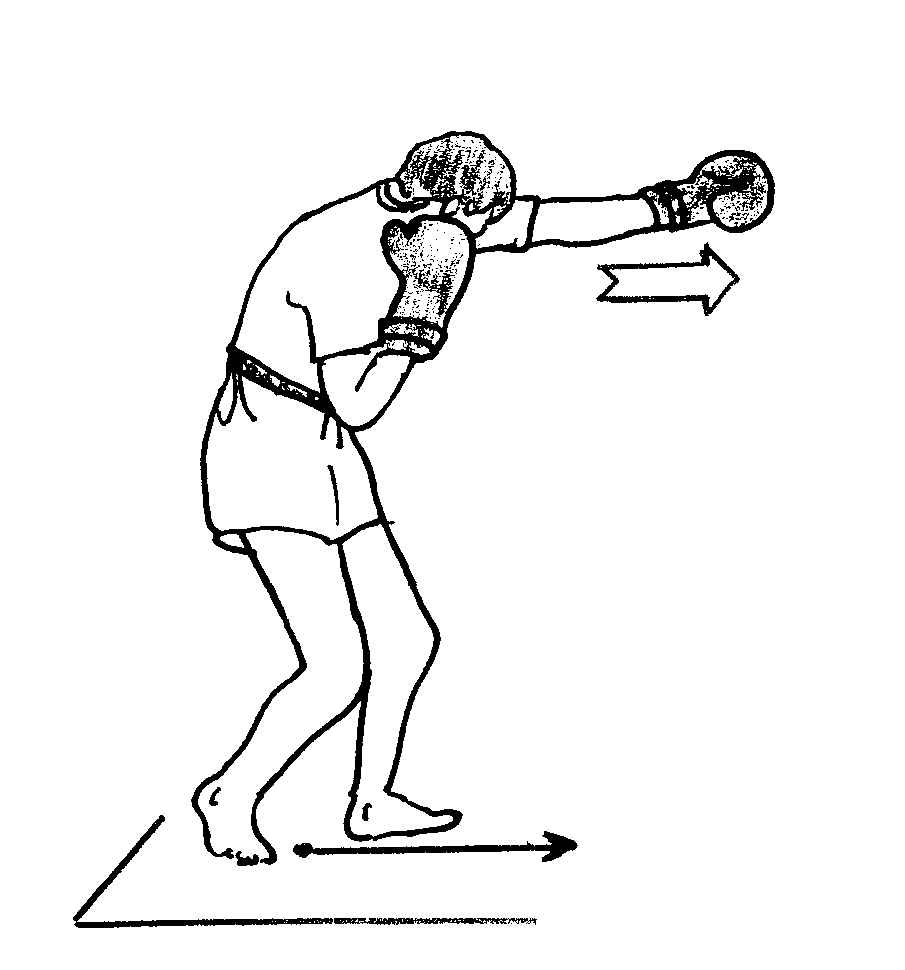
Shadowboxing

Shadowboxing is a combat sport exercise in which a person throws punches at the air as though there is an opponent, and is commonly used as a warm-up exercise. Practised primarily in striking-based martial arts or sports such as boxing, it serves mainly to develop and refine one's punching technique. Muhammad Ali once performed a now famous shadowboxing routine next to Howard Cosell for ABC's Wide World of Sports television cameras. Black Nova Scotian boxer George Dixon is widely credited for developing the technique.

== Details ==
Most boxing trainers prefer that their fighters do their shadow boxing before engaging in any other daily exercise routines. The main purpose of this exercise, apart from getting the muscles ready for another activity, is usually to maintain a fighter's rhythm and show the fighter how they would look at that stage of training against a certain opponent. This could be important as fighters envision themselves facing their immediate future opponents: it usually gives fighters an idea of what is, and what is not, to be fixed. It is also beneficial to sometimes incorporate dumbbells as you shadow box, so punches can flow quicker without them. It is also good to look in a mirror as you shadowbox so you can catch slight errors in your rhythm.

Fighters may want to do some shadowboxing of their own after their daily routines are over, either inside a boxing gym's ring, or wherever they please to at home without having to look directly at a mirror.

Each boxing round is 3 minutes. Shadowboxing is all about flowing offensively and defensively and it is also important to not throw full punches all the time, it can drain an individual out before the actual training starts.

Shadowboxing is not limited to boxers and fighters. Many fighters from other striking-based martial arts also use the exercise as part of their daily routines and aside from punches and perhaps dependent upon fighting style they will use kicks, knees, elbows, or even throws. Bruce Lee was often seen practicing his kicks in front of a mirror in his films, and he incorporated other concepts from boxing into his Jeet Kune Do style such as footwork and live sparring. Shadowboxing with swords and other weapons, referred to as a floryshe, is a major training tool among Historical European Martial Arts groups such as the Association for Renaissance Martial Arts and the HEMA Alliance.

Fighters of other more grappling-based martial arts also shadowbox as part of their daily training regimen. Freestyle wrestlers also practice many drills simulating specific wrestling moves without the aid of a partner such as shooting, sprawling, hip switches and bridging.

=== Styles ===
The long method involves a shuffle of the feet that rocks the body back and forth. This is a style favored by fighters with long reach, who use more jabs and straight shots. The short method sees the fighter move his head and body to the left and right, constantly slipping punches and moving in for closer body shots. Joe Frazier and Mike Tyson are among the best examples of fighters who use this method.

== In popular culture ==
In 2024, baseball player Tommy Pham of the Chicago White Sox shadowboxed after an altercation with William Contreras of the Milwaukee Brewers.

== Use beyond boxing ==
Although shadowboxing is most closely associated with boxing, it is also used in other combat sports as a solo drill for practicing movement, striking sequences, and body awareness. Academic discussion of the exercise describes shadowboxing as a training practice used across combat sports and emphasizes its role in developing awareness of movement and positioning without an opponent.

Shadowboxing is also used as another term for the straw man fallacy, in which one attacks a nonexistent position, usually with the intent of side-stepping the original topic.

The term may be used in the field of analytical psychology to describe a type of Shadow work.
