= ABSS =

ABSS may refer to:

- Alamance-Burlington School System, a school district
- Administration of the Property of the Holy See, or Amministrazione dei Beni della Santa Sede in Italian
- Agent-based social simulation, in social science
- Automated Boxing Scoring System, an electronic computer-based scoring system for amateur boxing
