= Kapap =

Israeli self-defense system

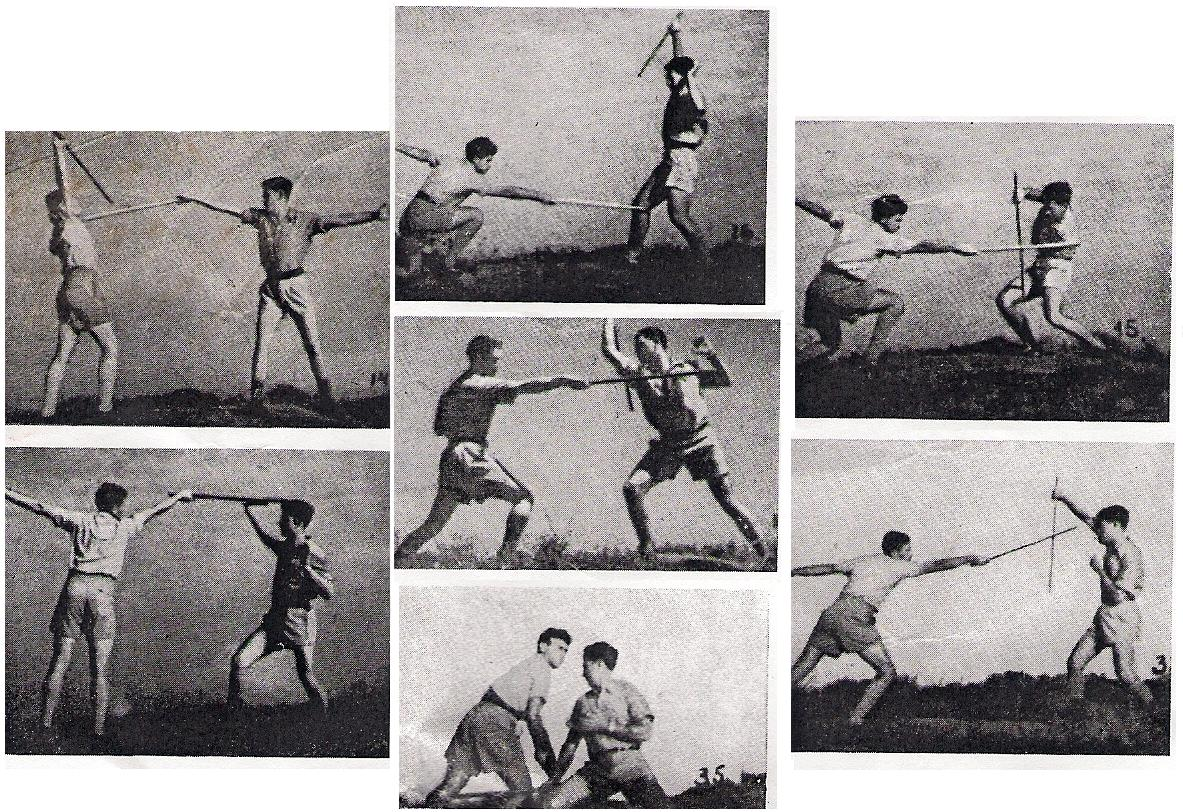
- Palmach soldiers practicing Kapap stick-fighting
- Focus: Hybrid martial arts
- Country of origin: Israel
- Olympic sport: No

Kapap (Hebrew: קפ"פ, קפא"פ), often written KAPAP, a Hebrew acronym for Krav Panim el Panim (lit. 'face-to-face combat'), is a close-quarter battle system of defensive tactics, hand-to-hand combat and self-defense.

== History ==
The Kapap system was developed in the late 1930s, within the Jewish Aliyah camps as part of preparatory training before their arrival in Mandatory Palestine. It was primarily considered a practical skill set that was acquired during the training period of the Palmach and Haganah fighters. The main focus was to upgrade the physical endurance, to elevate and strengthen the spirit, and to develop a defensive and offensive skill set. It included cold weapon practical usage, boxing, judo, jujutsu, karate, as well as fighting with knives and sticks.

In the 1930s, Maishel Horovitz, the leader of HaMahanot HaOlim youth movement, developed a short stick fighting method in order to deal with the British policemen who were armed with clubs. Later, his method became one of the main components of hand-to-hand combat training for all the Haganah fighters, therefore making a major contribution to the development of Kapap. According to the historian Noah Gross, however, Horovitz did not even know that his stick-fighting system was taught to the soldiers until 1959.

Chaim Pe'er is the President and founder of the International Kapap Federation. He is recognized internationally as a Soke – founder of the modern Kapap system.

== International Kapap organizations ==
=== Kapap Europe ===
Kapap Europe is organized and headed by Kapap Level 4 instructors, Sam Markey and William Paardekooper. Sam and William are the highest-ranking members of the International Kapap Federation in Europe. Markey holds monthly seminars in the United Kingdom to train and develop the European Kapap Instructor Team. Paardekooper holds courses in mainland Europe.

Sam Markey met Avi Nardia in the USA. He introduced Kapap to the United Kingdom and he was the first person authorized by Major Avi Nardia and Lt. Col. Chaim Pe'er to open an authorized Kapap training center.

=== Kapap Asia ===
Kapap Federation Asia is headed by Master Teo Yew Chye (Kapap Level 3 Instructor) and his training team on behalf of Major Avi Nardia and Lt. Col. Chaim Pe'er.

== See also ==
- Krav Maga
- Sayeret Matkal (Special Forces Unit of Lt. Co. Chaim Pe'er, Head of the International Kapap Federation)
- Yamam (Special Forces Police Unit)
