= Automated Boxing Scoring System =

The Automated Boxing Scoring System (ABSS) is a research and development project being developed by a group of Australian institutions and private companies. It aims to provide a training aid and unbiased scoring for the sport of amateur boxing, and potentially other combat and martial art sports.

== Development organisations ==
- Australian Institute of Sport (AIS)
- PWP Designs Pty. Ltd.
- Commonwealth Scientific and Industrial Research Organisation (CSIRO)

Previous involvement in the project:

- CRC for microTechnology
- Swinburne University of Technology (Melbourne)
- Griffith University (Brisbane)

== Overview ==
The system uses wireless communication, micro sensors, smart integration, and computer scoring in an attempt to encourage accuracy and safety in the sport of amateur boxing based on a concept initially developed at Griffith University by Kurt Pope. The "boxing suit" also aims to provide a powerful training aid for coaches and sports scientists.

The system allows monitoring of performance in real-time and is able to indicate the location of hits, display basic statistics on hit locations, and show the current score of each boxer. The advanced software package allows further analysis and playback of recorded bouts which allows the boxing coach and sports scientists to analyse and compare bouts blow-by-blow. The system comprises two suits, each of which includes a pair of standard boxing gloves, head guard protector, and thin light weight vests. Each suit has been instrumented to allow detection of impacts.

A new sport derived from boxing but modified for safety, called Box'Tag, is now using the system to score competitions.
