= Martial arts =

Codified systems and traditions of combat

Martial arts are codified systems and traditions of combat. They are practiced for a number of reasons ranging from self-defense, street fighting, military, and law enforcement to non-violent exercising, ceremonial, competition; physical, mental, and spiritual development; entertainment; and to preserve the intangible cultural heritage of a nation. The term "martial arts" was originally used to refer to the traditions of East Asia, but has subsequently been applied to other practices which originated outside that region.

== Etymology ==
According to John Clements, the term martial arts itself is derived from an older Latin term meaning the "arts of Mars", in reference to the Roman god of war, and was used to refer to the combat systems of Europe as early as the 1550s.

The term martial arts was popularized by mainstream popular culture during the 1960s to 1970s, notably by Hong Kong martial arts films and martial artists such as Bruce Lee, during the so-called "chopsocky" wave of the early 1970s.

The term martial science, or martial sciences, was commonly used to refer to Asian martial arts up until the 1970s, with the term Chinese boxing also being used to refer to Chinese martial arts until then.

Some authors have argued that fighting arts or fighting systems would be a more appropriate term as many martial arts were never "martial" in the sense of being used or created by professional warriors.

== Variation and scope ==
Martial arts may be categorized using a variety of criteria, including:

- Traditional/historical arts vs. contemporary styles: e.g., folk wrestling compared to modern hybrid martial arts.
- Techniques taught: armed vs. unarmed, and within these categories
  - armed: by type of weapon (swordsmanship, stick fighting etc.)
  - unarmed: by type of combat (grappling, striking, stand-up fighting, ground fighting)
- By application or intent: self-defense, combat sport, choreography or demonstration of forms, physical fitness, meditation, etc.
- Within Chinese tradition: "external" vs. "internal" styles

=== By technical focus ===
==== Unarmed ====
Unarmed martial arts can be broadly grouped into those focusing on strikes, those focusing on grappling, and those that cover both fields, often described as hybrid martial arts.

Strikes: punching and kicking techniques displayed at the Banteay Srei (967 A.D.) in Cambodia.

Strikes

- Punching: Boxing, Wing Chun, Kickboxing, Muay Thai, Karate, Taekwondo, Tang Soo Do, Kempo Karate, Taekkyon, Kyeok Sul Do, Kajukenbo
- Kicking: Kickboxing, Taekwondo, Muay Thai, Capoeira, Savate, Karate, Kung Fu, Taekkyon, Tang Soo Do, Kempo Karate
- Elbow Strike: Bokator, Kung Fu, Karate, Muay Thai, Kickboxing
- Knee Strike: Lethwei, Muay Thai, Bokator, Kung Fu, Karate, Taekwondo, Kickboxing
- Others using strikes: Bokator, Lethwei, Muay Thai, Kung Fu, Pencak Silat, Taijiquan, Vovinam

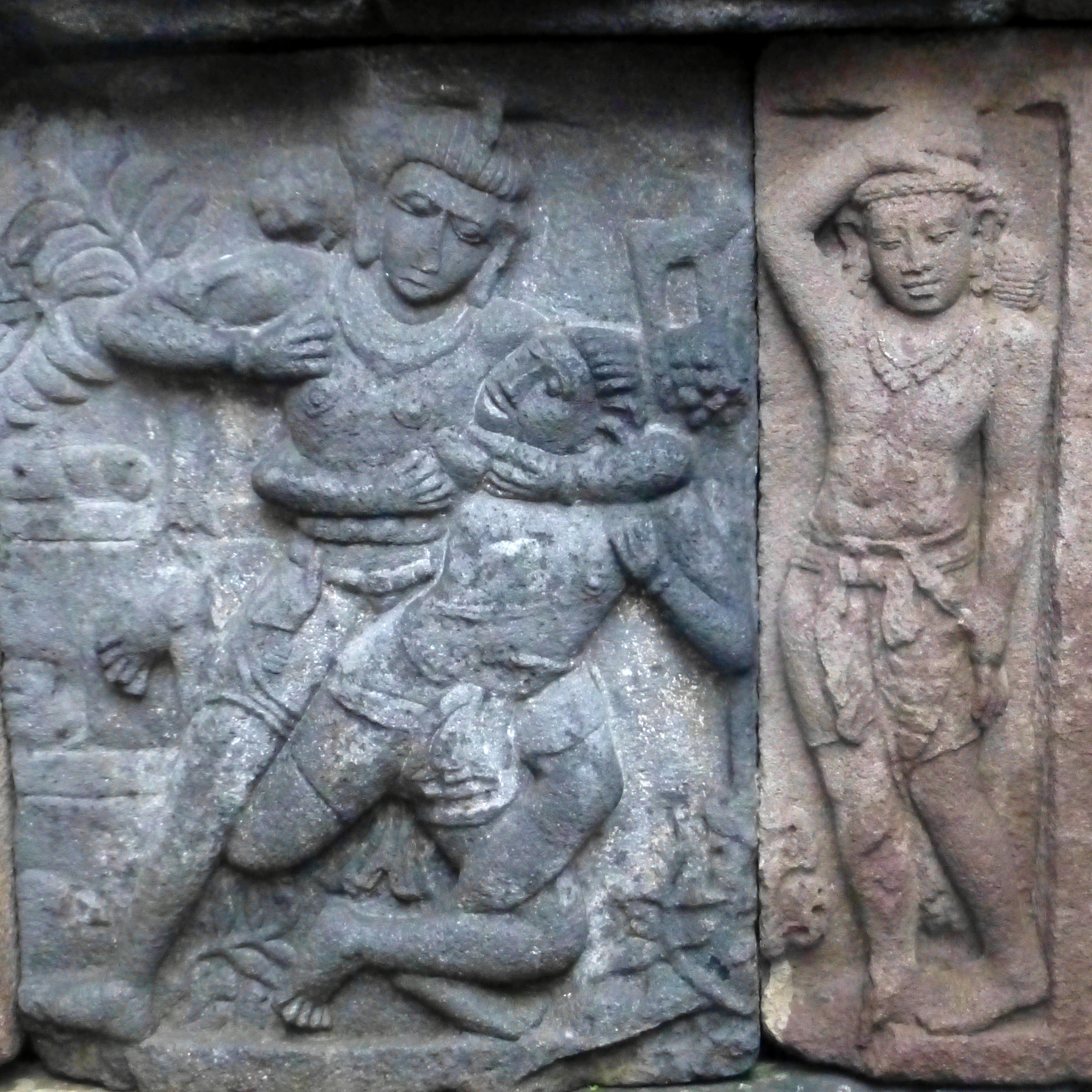
Grappling: bas-relief of grappling techniques at Prambanan (9th century) in Indonesia.

Grappling

- Throwing: Hapkido, Judo, Sumo, Wrestling, Aikido, Shuai Jiao, Taijiquan
- Joint lock/Chokeholds/Submission holds: Jujutsu, Brazilian jiu-jitsu, Aikido, Catch wrestling, Judo, Chin-na, Taijiquan, Karate, Hapkido
- Pinning Techniques: Judo, Wrestling, Aikido
- Trapping/Clinch fighting: Wing Chun, Filipino Martial Arts, Jeet Kune Do, Muay Thai, wrestling, Judo

==== Armed ====
The traditional martial arts that include armed combat often use a wide array of melee weapons such as bladed weapons and polearms. Such traditions include eskrima, silat, Kalaripayattu, kobudo, and historical European martial arts, especially those of the Italian Renaissance. Many Chinese martial arts also feature weapons as part of their curriculum.

Sometimes, the use and handling of a single weapon is considered a martial art, for example Japanese martial arts such as kenjutsu, kendo (sword), bojutsu (staff), and kyūdō (archery). Other similar modern martial arts and sports include modern fencing, Armored combat (sport), stick-fighting systems like canne de combat, modern competitive archery and practical shooting.

=== By application or intent ===
==== Spirituality-oriented ====
Traditional Korean martial arts place great emphasis on the practitioner's spiritual development. A common theme in most Korean styles, such as Taekkyon, taekwondo, and Hapkido is the focus on "inner peace", which is said to be achievable only through meditation and training. Korean martial arts believe that the use of physical force can only be justified in self defense. Japanese martial arts are called "Budō". The suffix "-do" translates to "way" or "path", as the martial art is meant to lead the practitioner towards a spiritually fulfilling life.

Pahlevani and zourkhaneh rituals is the UNESCO term for the Persian martial art of varzesh-e pahlavāni (Persian: آیین پهلوانی و زورخانه‌ای, "heroic sport") or varzesh-e bāstāni (ورزش باستانی; varzeš-e bāstānī, "ancient sport"), a traditional system that was originally used to train warriors in Iran (Persia), first appearing in its current name and form during the Safavid era, it has similarities to other systems in the region and is referred to by different names in those places.

== History ==
=== Historical martial arts ===
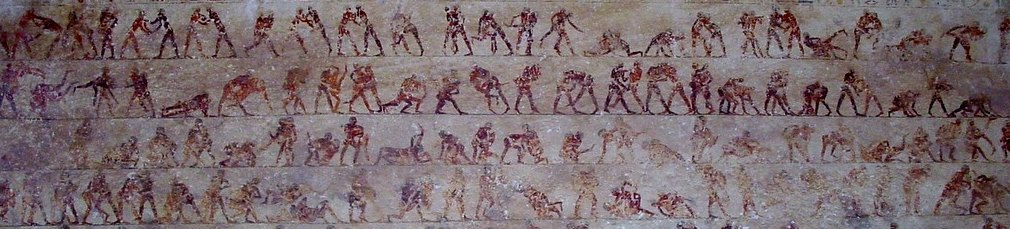
Detail of the wrestling fresco in tomb 15 at Beni Hasan

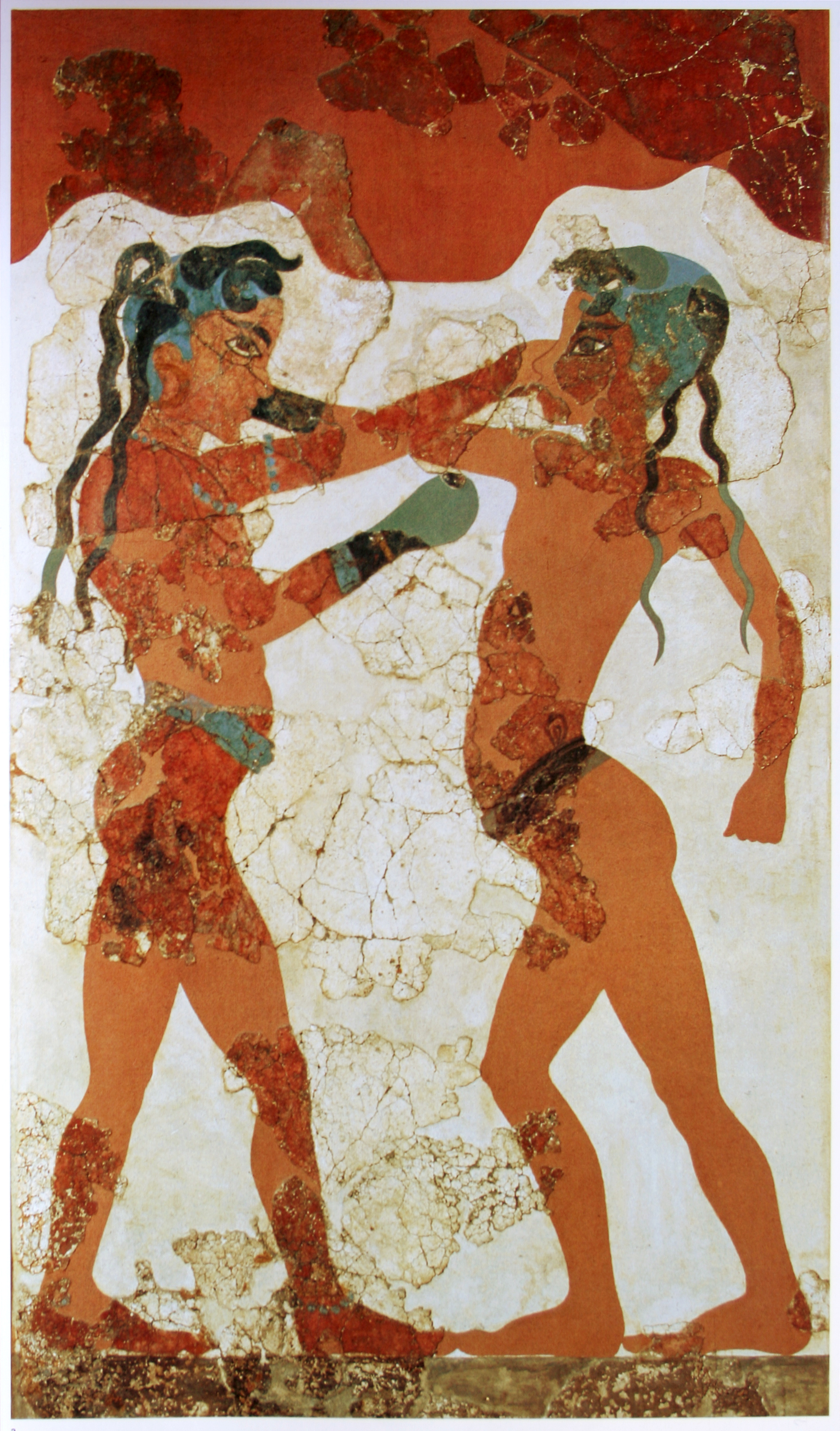
The martial art of boxing was practiced in ancient Thera (1600–1500 BC).

Human warfare dates back to the Epipalaeolithic and early Neolithic era. The oldest works of art depicting scenes of battle are cave paintings from eastern Spain dated to between 10,000 and 6,000 BCE that show organized groups fighting with bows and arrows. Similar evidence of warfare has also been found in Epipalaeolithic to early Neolithic era mass burials, excavated in Germany and at Jebel Sahaba in Northern Sudan.

Wrestling is the oldest combat sport, with origins in hand-to-hand combat. While its foundational origins lie in global prehistory, it existed throughout human history in various parts of the world in many different styles that are independently developed. Depictions of Belt wrestling can be found in Mesopotamian and Ancient Egyptian works of art dating to c. 3000 BC, and later in the Sumerian Epic of Gilgamesh. The earliest known depiction of boxing is a Sumerian relief found in Mesopotamia dating to the 3rd millennium BC.

The development of modern Chinese and Indian martial arts was likely facilitated by early cultural exchanges between China and India. During the Warring States period (480–221 BC) in China, extensive development in martial philosophy and strategy took place, as mentioned by Sun Tzu in The Art of War (c. 350 BC). Legendary accounts link the origin of Shaolinquan to the spread of Buddhism from ancient India during the early 5th century AD, and the coming of Bodhidharma, to China. Written evidence of martial arts in Southern India dates back to the Sangam literature (2nd century BCE - 2nd century AD). The combat techniques of the Sangam period are the earliest precursors of Kalaripayattu.

In Europe, the earliest martial arts traditions date to Ancient Greece. Boxing (pygme, pyx), wrestling (pale) and pankration featured in the Ancient Olympic Games. The Romans produced gladiatorial combat as a public spectacle.

A number of combat manuals have survived from the European Middle Ages, and include such styles as sword and shield, two-handed swordfighting and other types of melee weapons in addition to unarmed combat. Amongst these are transcriptions of Johannes Liechtenauer's mnemonic poem on the longsword dating back to the late 14th century. Likewise, Asian martial arts became well-documented during the medieval period; Japanese martial arts beginning with the establishment of the samurai nobility in the 12th century, Chinese martial arts during the Ming era with treatises such as Ji Xiao Xin Shu, Indian martial arts in medieval texts such as the Agni Purana and the Malla Purana and Korean martial arts during the Joseon era with texts such as the Muyejebo (1598).

European swordsmanship always had a sportive component, but the duel was always a possibility until World War I. Modern sport fencing began developing during the 19th century as the French and Italian military academies began codifying rules. The Olympic games led to standard international rules, with the Féderation Internationale d'Escrime being founded in 1913. Modern boxing originates with the rules of Jack Broughton in the 18th century, and reached its present form under the Rules of the Marquess of Queensberry in 1867.

=== Folk styles ===
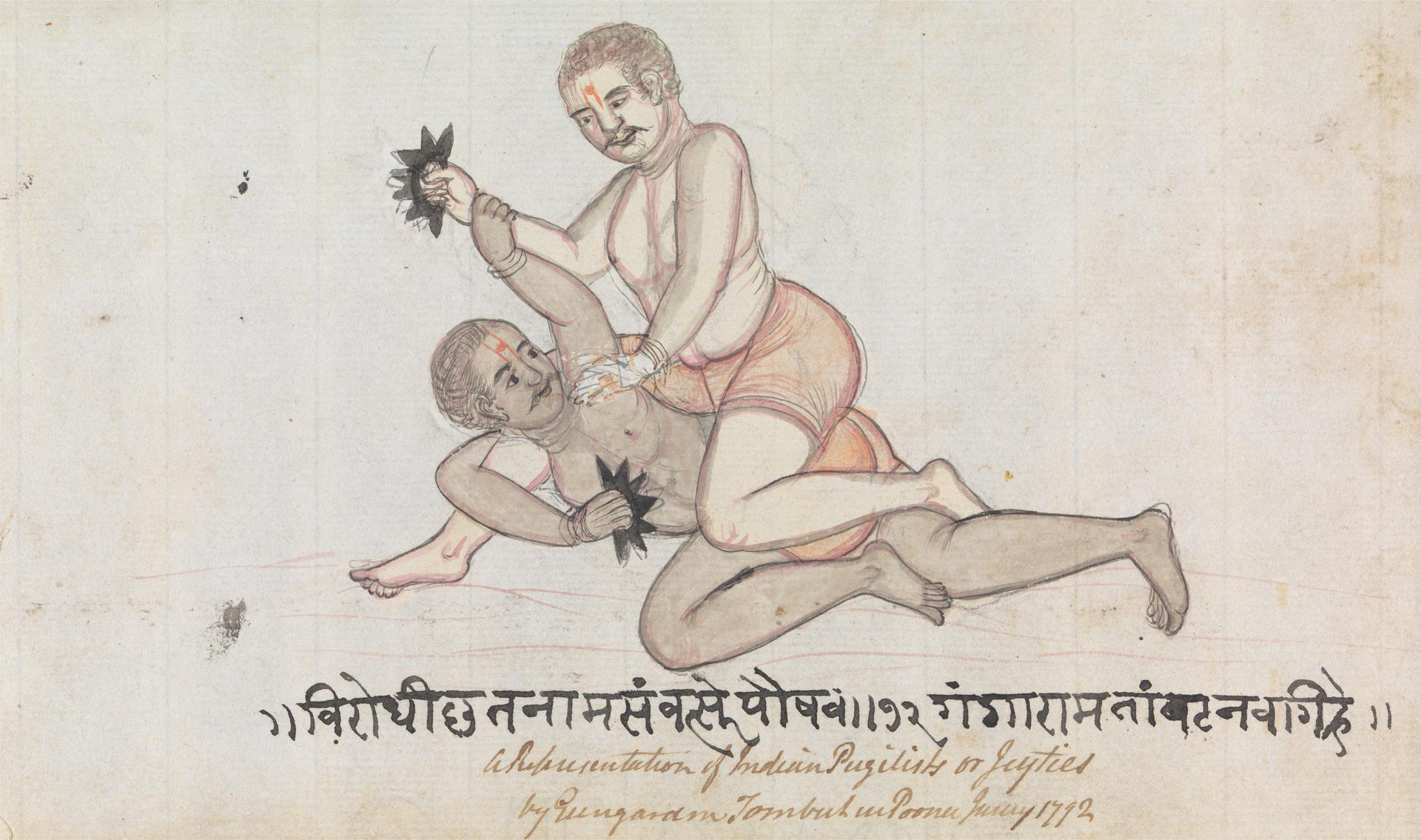
Drawing of Indian wrestlers carrying vajra-mushti (1792 A.D.)

Certain traditional combat sports and fighting styles exist all over the world, rooted in local culture and folklore. The most common of these are styles of folk wrestling, some of which have been practiced since antiquity and are found in the most remote areas. Other examples include forms of stick fighting and boxing. While these arts are based on historical traditions and folklore, they are not "historical" in the sense that they reconstruct or preserve a historical system from a specific era. They are rather contemporary regional sports that coexist with the modern forms of martial arts sports as they have developed since the 19th century, often including cross-fertilization between sports and folk styles; thus, the traditional Thai art of muay boran developed into the modern national sport of muay Thai, which in turn came to be practiced worldwide and contributed significantly to modern hybrid styles like kickboxing and mixed martial arts. The English martial art of Singlestick, can often be seen used in morris dancing. Many European dances have elements derived from martial arts, these include the Ukrainian Hopak, Polish Zbójnicki (use of ciupaga), the Czech dance odzemek, and the Norwegian Halling.

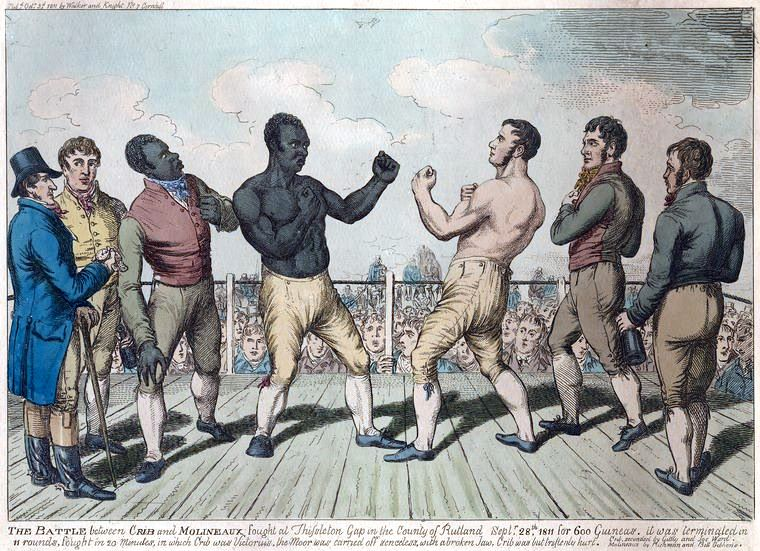
Boxing in England, 1811

=== Modern history ===
==== Late 19th to early 20th century ====
The mid to late 19th century marks the beginning of martial arts as modern sports, developing out of earlier traditional fighting systems. In Europe, this included the development of boxing, wrestling and fencing as sports. In Japan, the same period marks the creation of modern judo, jujutsu, karate, and kendo based on earlier schools of martial arts which existed during the Edo period and which had been suppressed during the Meiji Restoration. In 1882, Kano Jigoro established the Kodokan School of judo, thus starting the sport of judo. Kano Jigoro had studied old forms jujutsu before establishing his judo school.

Modern Muay Thai rules date to the 1920s. In China, the modern history of martial arts begins in the Nanjing decade (1930s) following the foundation of the Central Guoshu Institute in 1928 under the Kuomintang government.

Western interest in Asian martial arts arises towards the end of the 19th century, due to the increase in trade between the United States with China and Japan. Relatively few Westerners actually practiced the arts, considering it to be mere performance. Edward William Barton-Wright, a railway engineer who had studied jujutsu while working in Japan between 1894 and 1897, was the first man known to have taught Asian martial arts in Europe. He also founded an eclectic style named Bartitsu which combined jujutsu, judo, wrestling, boxing, savate and stick fighting.

Fencing and Greco-Roman wrestling was included in the 1896 Summer Olympics. FILA Wrestling World Championships and Boxing at the Summer Olympics were introduced in 1904. The tradition of awarding championship belts in wrestling and boxing can be traced to the Lonsdale Belt, introduced in 1909.

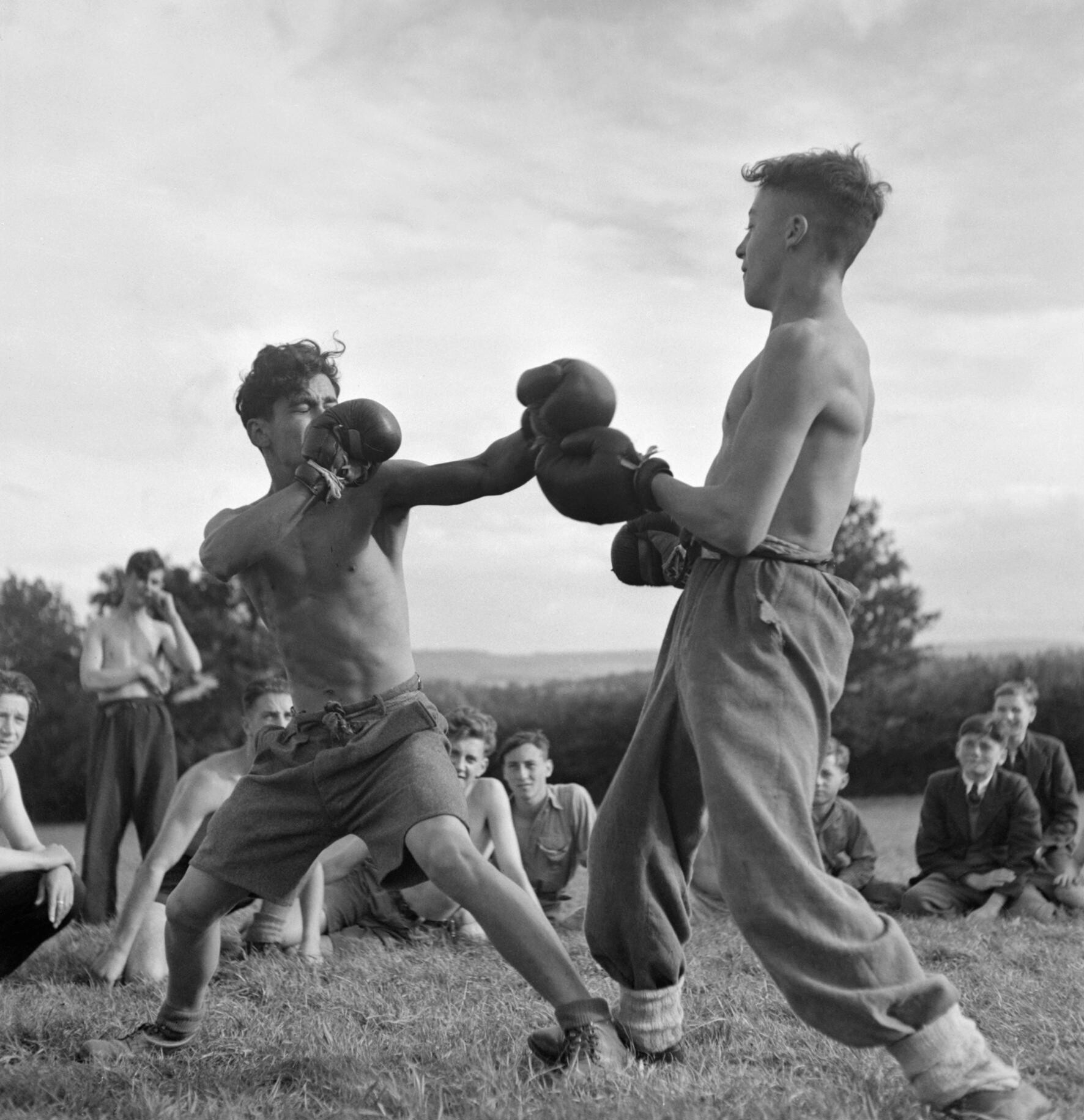
Boxing in 1943

==== Rest of the 20th century (1914 to 1999) ====
The International Boxing Association was established in 1920 and the World Fencing Championships have been held since 1921. As Western influence grew in Asia a greater number of military personnel spent time in China, Japan and South Korea during World War II and the Korean War and were exposed to local fighting styles. Jujutsu, judo and karate first became popular among the mainstream from the 1950s–1960s. Due in part to Asian and Hollywood martial arts movies, most modern American martial arts are either Asian-derived or Asian influenced. The term kickboxing (kikku bokushingu キックボクシング) was created by the Japanese boxing promoter Osamu Noguchi for a variant of Muay Thai and Karate that he created in the 1950s. American kickboxing was developed in the 1970s, as a combination of boxing and karate.Taekwondo was developed in the context of the Korean War in the 1950s.

The late 1960s and the 1970s witnessed an increased media interest in Chinese martial arts, influenced by martial artist Bruce Lee. Bruce Lee is credited as one of the first instructors to openly teach Chinese martial arts to Westerners. World Judo Championships have been held since 1956, and Judo was introduced to the Summer Olympics in 1964. Karate World Championships were introduced in 1970.

The "kung fu wave" of Hong Kong action cinema in the 1970s, especially Bruce Lee films, popularized martial arts in global popular culture. A number of mainstream films produced during the 1980s also contributed significantly to the perception of martial arts in Western popular culture. These include The Karate Kid (1984) and Bloodsport (1988). This era produced some Hollywood action stars with martial arts background, such as Jean-Claude Van Damme and Chuck Norris.

Also during the 20th century, a number of martial arts were adapted for self-defense purposes and for military hand-to-hand combat. World War II combatives, KAPAP (1930s) and Krav Maga (1950s) in Israel, Systema in Soviet-era Russia, and Sanshou in the People's Republic of China are examples of such systems. The US military de-emphasized hand-to-hand combat training during the Cold War period, but revived it with the introduction of LINE in 1989.

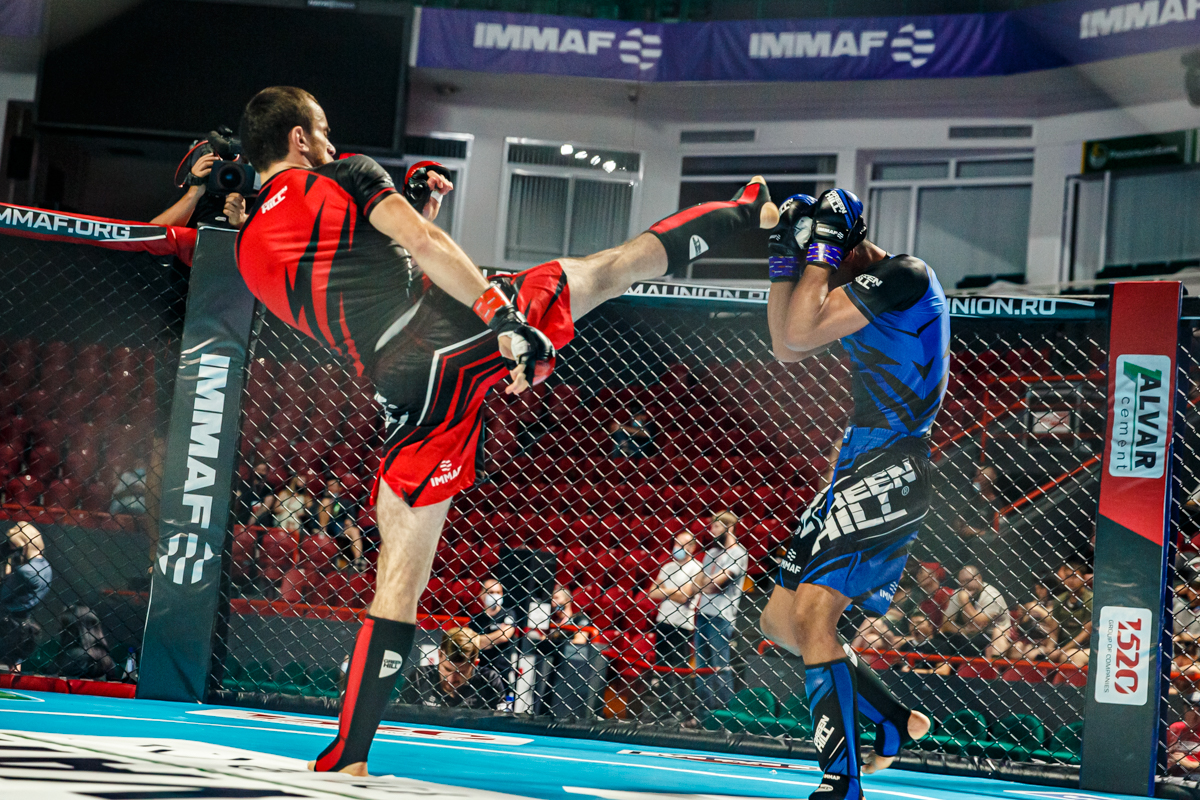
Mixed martial arts championship in Russia in 2021

In 1993, the first Pancrase event was held in Japan. The K-1 rules of kickboxing were introduced, based on 1980s Seidokaikan karate.

During the 1990s, Brazilian jiu-jitsu and proved to be effective in UFC and PRIDE. Brazilian jiu-jitsu and the sport of Mixed Martial Arts sparked a revolution in martial arts that started to spread internationally in the 90s.

Jackie Chan and Bruce Lee were prominent martial artists who became major movie stars during the 20th century. They have played a pivotal role in popularizing and promoting Chinese martial arts in the West.

The continual discovery of medieval and Renaissance fighting manuals has led to the practice of Historical European Martial Arts and other Western Martial Arts, which have since gained popularity across the United States and Europe.

==== 21st century ====
By the early 2000s, Brazilian jiu-jitsu became a sport that is known worldwide. Dana White became the CEO of UFC in 2001 and brought success to the promotion. This caused the modern MMA to become known worldwide from the early 21st century and afterwards. Both of these factors caused the revolution in martial arts to be globally present.

On 29 November 2011, UNESCO inscribed Taekkyon onto its Intangible Cultural Heritage of Humanity List.

=== Revival ===
Many Indian martial arts were banned by the colonial authorities during the period of British rule, which led to their decline. Some, such as Kalaripayattu, were able to resist this decline by practicing in secret. Other Indian martial art, such as Silambam, while not widely practiced in India, continue to be practiced in other countries in the Indian cultural sphere such as Indonesia and Malaysia. Many other Indian martial arts such as Mardhani Khel and Paika Akhada survived by practitioners practicing the art in secret, or by telling the colonial authorities that it was a form of dance. While many regional Indian martial arts forms are fading into obscurity, martial arts such as Gatka and Kalaripayattu are experiencing a gradual resurgence.

== Testing and competition ==
Testing or evaluation is important to martial artists of many disciplines who wish to determine their progression or own level of skill in specific contexts. Students often undergo periodic testing and grading by their own teacher in order to advance to a higher level of recognized achievement, such as a different belt color or title. The type of testing used varies from system to system but may include forms or sparring.

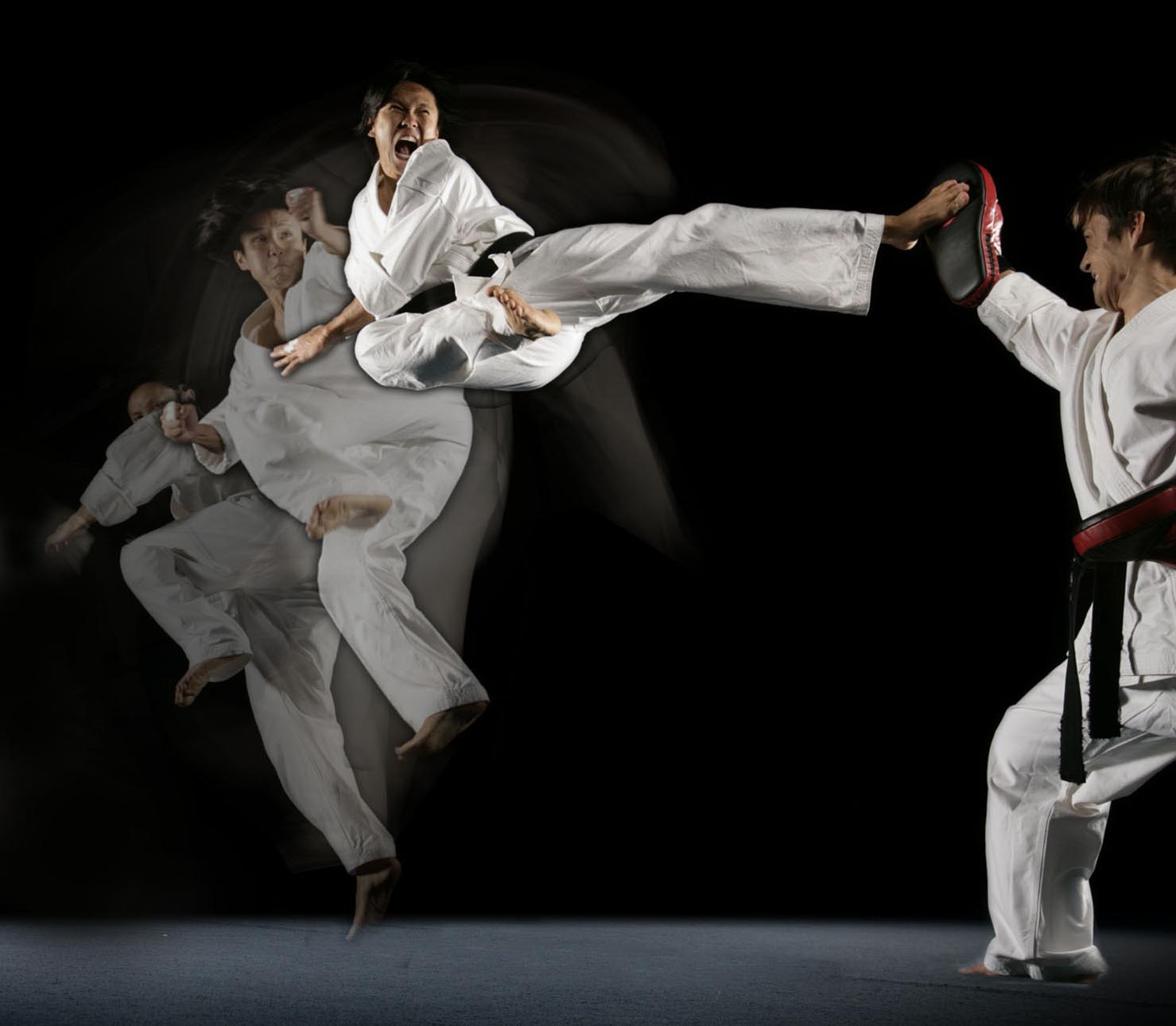
Steven Ho executing a Jump Spin Hook Kick

Various forms and sparring are commonly used in martial art exhibitions and tournaments. Some competitions pit practitioners of different disciplines against each other using a common set of rules, these are referred to as mixed martial arts competitions. Rules for sparring vary between art and organization but can generally be divided into light-contact, medium-contact, and full-contact variants, reflecting the amount of force that should be used on an opponent.

=== Light- and medium-contact ===
These types of sparring restrict the amount of force that may be used to hit an opponent, in the case of light sparring this is usually to 'touch' contact, e.g. a punch should be 'pulled' as soon as or before contact is made. In medium-contact (sometimes referred to as semi-contact) the punch would not be 'pulled' but not hit with full force. As the amount of force used is restricted, the aim of these types of sparring is not to knock out an opponent; a point system is used in competitions.

A referee acts to monitor for fouls and to control the match, while judges mark down scores, as in boxing. Particular targets may be prohibited, certain techniques may be forbidden (such as headbutting or groin hits), and fighters may be required to wear protective equipment on their head, hands, chest, groin, shins or feet. Some grappling arts, such as aikido, use a similar method of compliant training that is equivalent to light or medium contact.

In some styles (such as fencing and some styles of taekwondo sparring), competitors score points based on the landing of a single technique or strike as judged by the referee, whereupon the referee will briefly stop the match, award a point, then restart the match. Alternatively, sparring may continue with the point noted by the judges. Some critics of point sparring feel that this method of training teaches habits that result in lower combat effectiveness. Lighter-contact sparring may be used exclusively, for children or in other situations when heavy contact would be inappropriate (such as beginners), medium-contact sparring is often used as training for full contact.

=== Full-contact ===
Full-contact sparring or competition, where strikes or techniques are not pulled but used with full force as the name implies, has a number of tactical differences from light and medium-contact sparring. It is considered by some to be requisite in learning realistic unarmed combat.

In full-contact sparring, the aim of a competitive match is to knock out the opponent or to force the opponent to submit. Where scoring takes place it may be a subsidiary measure, only used if no clear winner has been established by other means; in some competitions, such as the UFC 1, there was no scoring, though most now use some form of judging as a backup. Due to these factors, full-contact matches tend to be more aggressive in character, but rule sets may still mandate the use of protective equipment, or limit the techniques allowed.

Nearly all mixed martial arts organizations such as UFC, Pancrase, Shooto use a form of full-contact rules as do professional boxing organizations and K-1. Kyokushin karate requires advanced practitioners to engage in bare-knuckled, full-contact sparring allowing kicks, knees and punching although elbows, groin strikes, joint strikes, and punching to the head is disallowed, and mouthguard, groin guard are required for males, and a chest guard must worn under the karate gi for females. Brazilian jiu-jitsu and judo matches do not allow striking, but are full-contact in the sense that full force is applied in the permitted grappling and submission techniques. Competitions held by World Taekwondo requires the use of Headgear and padded vests, but are full contact in the sense that full force is applied to strikes to the head and body, and win by knockout is possible.

Within Kyokushin Karate, one of the defining aspects is the level of challenge and contact within kumite. The ultimate challenge in Kyokushin Karate is the 100-man kumite challenge, this is where a challenger must complete a total of 100 continuous rounds with ideally a new partner in each round. This challenge is considered one of the ultimate tests of endurance, strength, technique and spirit in martial arts with only 30 people to have successfully completed this feat.

=== Martial sport ===
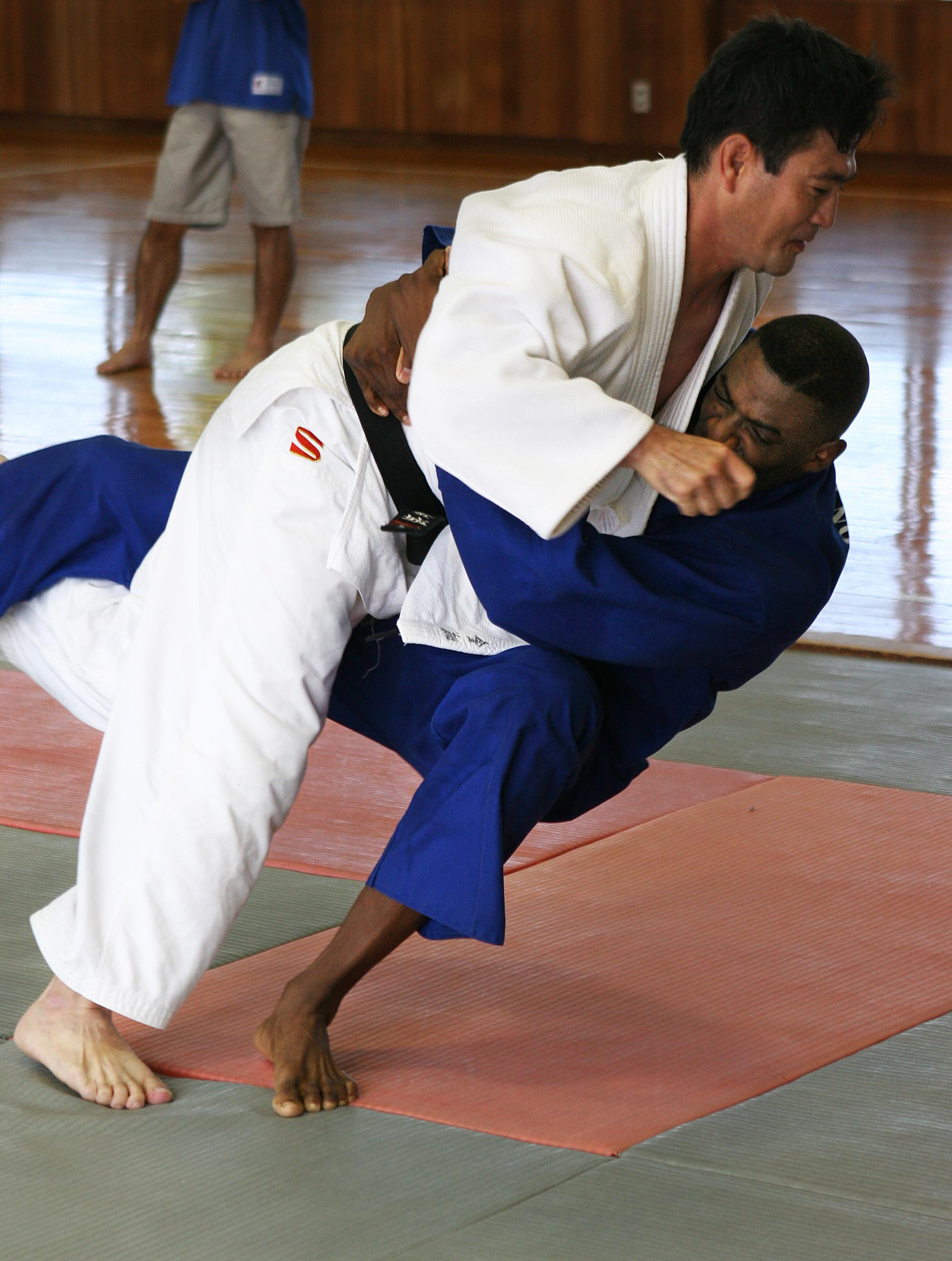
Several martial arts, such as judo, are Olympic sports.

Martial arts have crossed over into sports when forms of sparring become competitive, becoming a sport in its own right that is dissociated from the original combative origin, such as with western fencing. The Summer Olympic Games includes judo, taekwondo, western archery, boxing, javelin, wrestling and fencing as events, while Chinese wushu recently failed in its bid to be included, but is still actively performed in tournaments across the world. Practitioners in some arts such as kickboxing and Brazilian jiu-jitsu often train for sport matches, whereas those in other arts such as aikido generally spurn such competitions. Some schools believe that competition breeds better and more efficient practitioners, and gives a sense of good sportsmanship. Others believe that the rules under which competition takes place have diminished the combat effectiveness of martial arts or encourage a kind of practice which focuses on winning trophies rather than a focus such as cultivating a particular moral character.

The question of "which is the best martial art" has led to inter style competitions fought with very few rules allowing a variety of fighting styles to enter with few limitations. This was marketed as the origin of the first Ultimate Fighting Championship tournament (later renamed UFC 1: The Beginning) in the USA inspired by the Brazilian Vale tudo tradition and along with other minimal rule competitions, most notably those from Japan such as Shooto and Pancrase, have evolved into the combat sport of Mixed Martial Arts (MMA).

Some martial artists compete in non-sparring competitions such as breaking or choreographed routines of techniques such as poomse, kata and aka, or modern variations of the martial arts which include dance-influenced competitions such as tricking. Martial traditions have been influenced by governments to become more sport-like for political purposes; the central impetus for the attempt by the People's Republic of China in transforming Chinese martial arts into the committee-regulated sport of wushu was suppressing what they saw as the potentially subversive aspects of martial training, especially under the traditional system of family lineages.

== Health and fitness benefits ==
Martial arts training aims to result in several benefits to trainees, such as their physical, mental, emotional and spiritual health.

Through systematic practice in the martial arts a person's physical fitness may be boosted (strength, stamina, speed, flexibility, movement coordination, etc.) as the whole body is exercised and the entire muscular system is activated. Beyond contributing to physical fitness, martial arts training also has benefits for mental health, contributing to self-esteem, self-control, emotional and spiritual well-being. For this reason, a number of martial arts schools have focused purely on therapeutic aspects, de-emphasizing the historical aspect of self-defense or combat completely.

Bruce Lee viewed martial arts as an art form, emphasizing that it involves not only physical mastery but also emotional and mental expression. Through fluidity, balance, and spontaneous reaction, martial artists communicate emotionally, transcending mere technique and transforming combat into a deeply personal and expressive form of communication.

== Self-defense, military and law enforcement applications ==
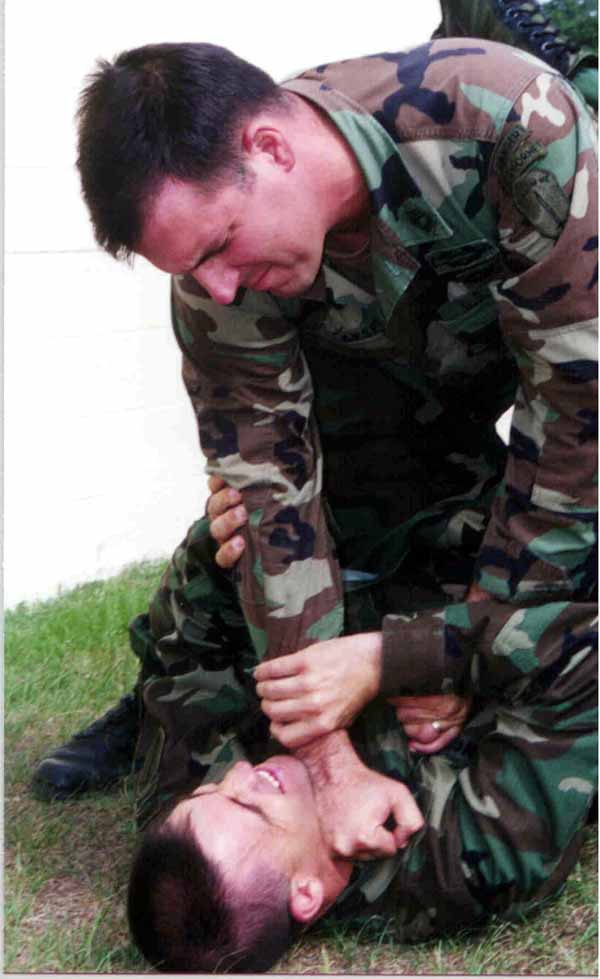
U.S. Army combatives instructor demonstrates a chokehold.

Some traditional martial concepts have seen new use within modern military training. Perhaps the most recent example of this is point shooting which relies on muscle memory to more effectively use a firearm in a variety of awkward situations, much the way an iaidoka would master movements with their sword.

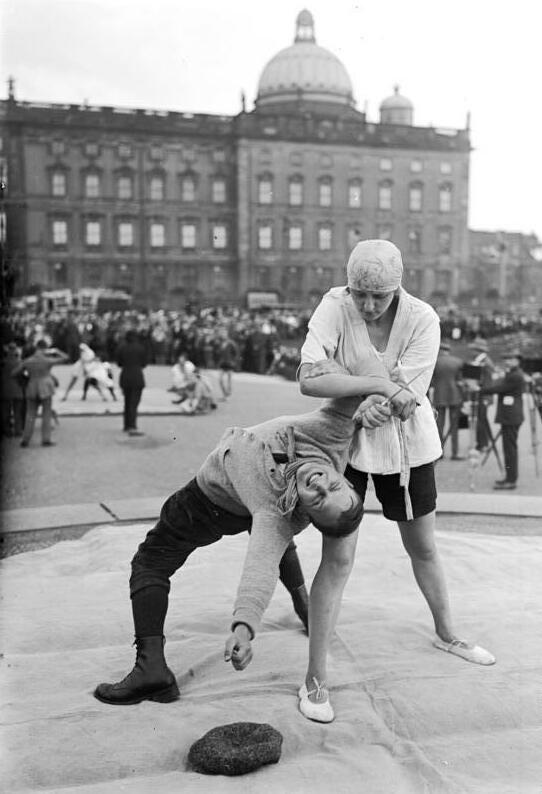
Demonstration of a Ju-Jitsu defense against a knife attack. Berlin 1924

During the World War II era William E. Fairbairn and Eric A. Sykes were recruited by the Special Operations Executive (SOE) to teach their martial art of Defendu (itself drawing on Western boxing and Jujutsu) and pistol shooting to UK, US, and Canadian special forces. The book Kill or Get Killed, written by Colonel Rex Applegate, was based on the Defendu taught by Sykes and Fairbairn. Both Fairbairn's Get Tough and Appelgate's Kill or Get Killed became classic works on hand-to-hand combat.

Traditional hand-to-hand, knife, and spear techniques continue to see use in the composite systems developed for today's wars. Examples of this include European Unifight, the US Army's Combatives system developed by Matt Larsen, the Israeli army's KAPAP and Krav Maga, and the US Marine Corps's Marine Corps Martial Arts Program (MCMAP). Unarmed dagger defenses identical to those found in the manual of Fiore dei Liberi and the Codex Wallerstein were integrated into the U.S. Army's training manuals in 1942 and continue to influence today's systems along with other traditional systems such as eskrima and silat.

The rifle-mounted bayonet which has its origin in the spear, has seen use by the United States Army, the United States Marine Corps, and the British Army as recently as the Iraq War.

Many martial arts are also seen and used in Law Enforcement hand-to-hand training. For example, the Tokyo Riot Police's use of aikido.

== Martial arts industry ==
Martial arts since the 1970s has become a significant industry, a subset of the wider sport industry (including cinema and sports television).

Hundreds of millions of people worldwide practice some form of martial art. Web Japan (sponsored by the Japanese Ministry of Foreign Affairs) claims there are 50 million karate practitioners worldwide. The South Korean government in 2009 published an estimate that taekwondo is practiced by 70 million people in 190 countries.

The wholesale value of martial arts related sporting equipment shipped in the United States was estimated at US$314 million in 2007; participation in the same year was estimated at 6.9 million (ages 6 or older, 2% of US population). R. A. Court, CEO of Martial Arts Channel, stated the total revenue of the US martial arts industry at US$40 billion and the number of US practitioners at 30 million in 2003.

=== Equipment ===
Martial arts equipment can include that which is used for conditioning, protection and weapons. Specialized conditioning equipment can include breaking boards, dummy partners such as the wooden dummy, and targets such as punching bags and the makiwara. Protective equipment for sparring and competition includes boxing gloves, headgear and mouthguards.

=== Martial arts fraud ===
Asian martial arts experienced a surge of popularity in the West during the 1970s, and the rising demand resulted in numerous low quality or fraudulent schools. Fueled by fictional depictions in martial arts movies, this led to the ninja craze of the 1980s in the United States. There were also numerous fraudulent ads for martial arts training programs, inserted into comic books circa the 1960s and 1970s, which were read primarily by adolescent boys.

In the seventies, lower ranks (Kyū) began to be given colorful belts to show progress. This proved to be commercially viable and colored-belt systems were adopted into many martial arts schools and systems, this also led to exploitation within many martial arts degree mills (also known as McDojos and belt factories) as a means to generate additional cash. This was covered in the Penn & Teller: Bullshit! episode "Martial Arts" (June 2010).

Fraudulent martial arts practitioners are still common across the world. Martial arts fraudsters will often run their classes with a cult-like mentality. They often teach techniques which are ineffective, potentially dangerous, and that are likely to give practitioners a false sense of security. Some claim supernatural abilities, such as the "no-touch K.O's". Instructors of "McDojo's" often make outlandish claims about their own success or in many cases self-promote themselves without a background to defend such claims.

== See also ==
- Martial arts timeline
- History of martial arts
- List of martial arts
- List of sports

== Bibliography ==
- Corcoran, John (1992). The Martial Arts Companion: Culture, History, and Enlightenment. Mallard Press. ISBN 0-7924-5762-5.
