= Headgear (martial arts) =

Padded helmet

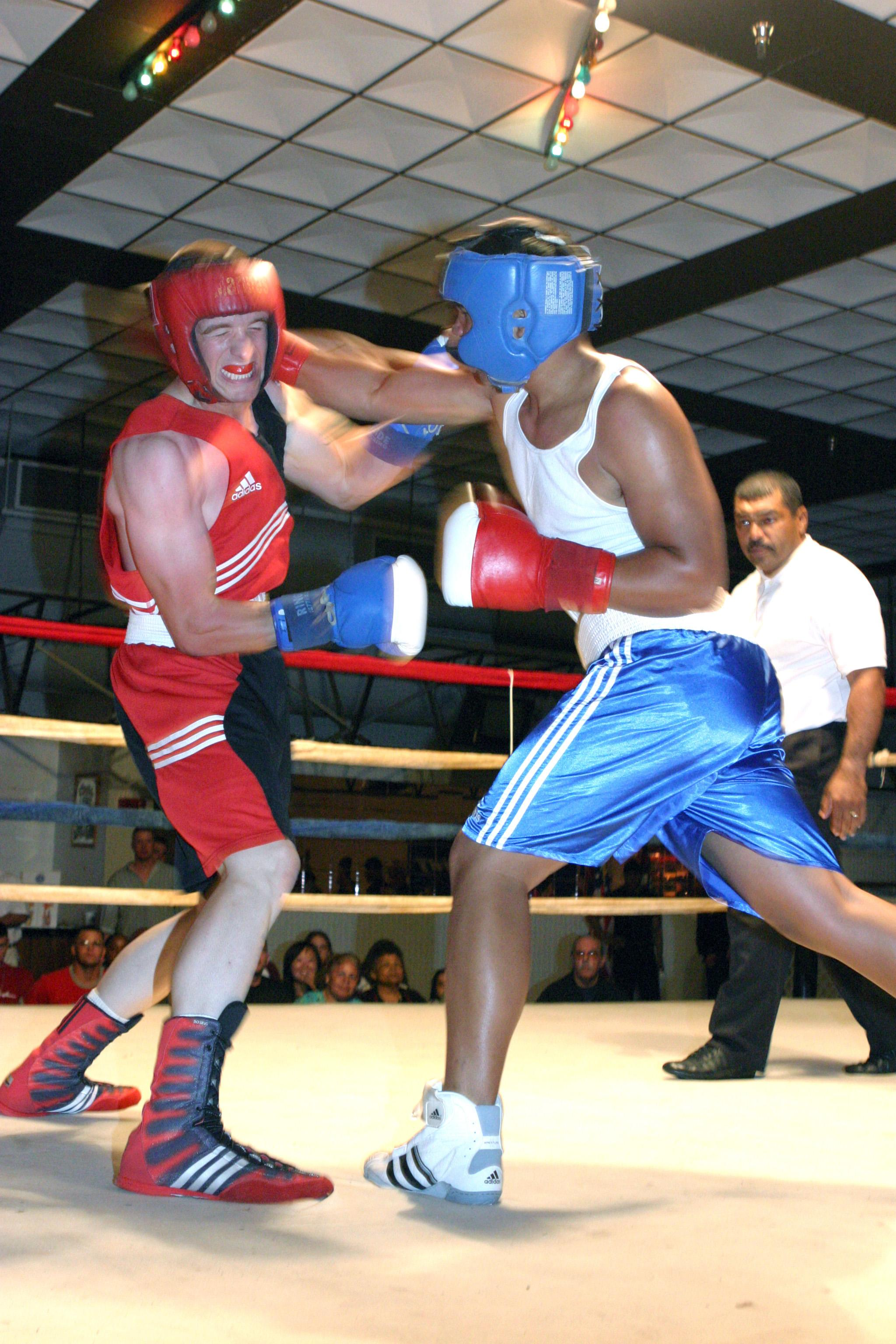
The fighters in this Amateur boxing bout are wearing headgear.

Headgear is a padded helmet worn during sparring in the martial arts.

== Boxing ==
Headgear is a padded helmet, worn on the head by contestants in Amateur and Olympic boxing. It effectively protects against cuts, scrapes, and swelling, but it does not protect very well against concussions. It will not protect the brain from the jarring that occurs when the head is struck. Also, most boxers aim for the chin on opponents, and the chin is usually not protected by headgear.

There are different types of boxing headgear available. Some headgear is open-faced. This is the style normally used in amateur boxing competitions. Unlike open-faced headgear, training headgear covers the cheek. "Face-saver" headgear features a pad across the face so that no direct contact is made to the face. As the amount of padding in headgear is increased, visibility is reduced.

=== Usage mandates ===
In 1984, the International Boxing Association (AIBA) began to mandate the use of headguards in all amateur matches at the national, continental and international levels.

In March 2013, the association announced that it would end the use of headgear in senior men's boxing (19–40 years old), while remaining mandatory for women and junior men. It cited recent studies finding that headgear actually increased the risk of concussions and head injuries, as they provided a false sense of security that encouraged boxers to take more risks (including harder punches at the head, and headbutts) than they otherwise might, and created vision obstructions that made their heads an easier target. The change was implemented in June 2013, and was adopted at the Olympics for the first time in 2016.

The changes faced a mixed reaction, with critics believing that the headgear ban was to help make amateur boxing closer resemble professional boxing for marketing reasons, and would increase the risk of cuts. During the 2014 Commonwealth Games, the team of Daniel Lewis called for the decision to be reevaluated after he was ruled out after sustaining a cut during a match. In 2017, Boxing Canada reinstated the headgear mandate for senior men's boxing below the provincial level, in order to "ease our elite national boxers and prospects into competition without headgear."

== Wrestling ==
Wrestling headgear is designed to protect the ears from damage. It features either soft or hard plastic ear covers and straps around the chin and back of the head. It is commonly used in grappling sports such as amateur wrestling, submission wrestling and Brazilian jiu-jitsu.

== Point fighting ==
Point fighting headgear, which is commonly required in sport karate tournaments is made of a molded and dipped foam. This type of headgear is most common in no contact and semi contact fighting. It is designed to protect against accidental impact, including the head hitting the floor after a slip or knockdown. This sort of headgear can be open face, full faced and sometimes even a full plastic face shield.

== Taekwondo ==
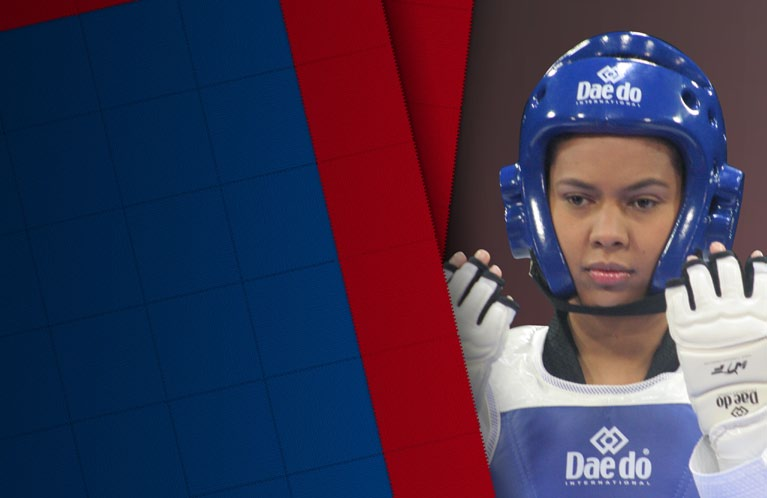

World Taekwondo requires red or blue head protectors. They can be provided with electronic sensors to register hits.

== See also ==
- Sportswear (activewear)
