= Sparring =

Type of training for combat sports

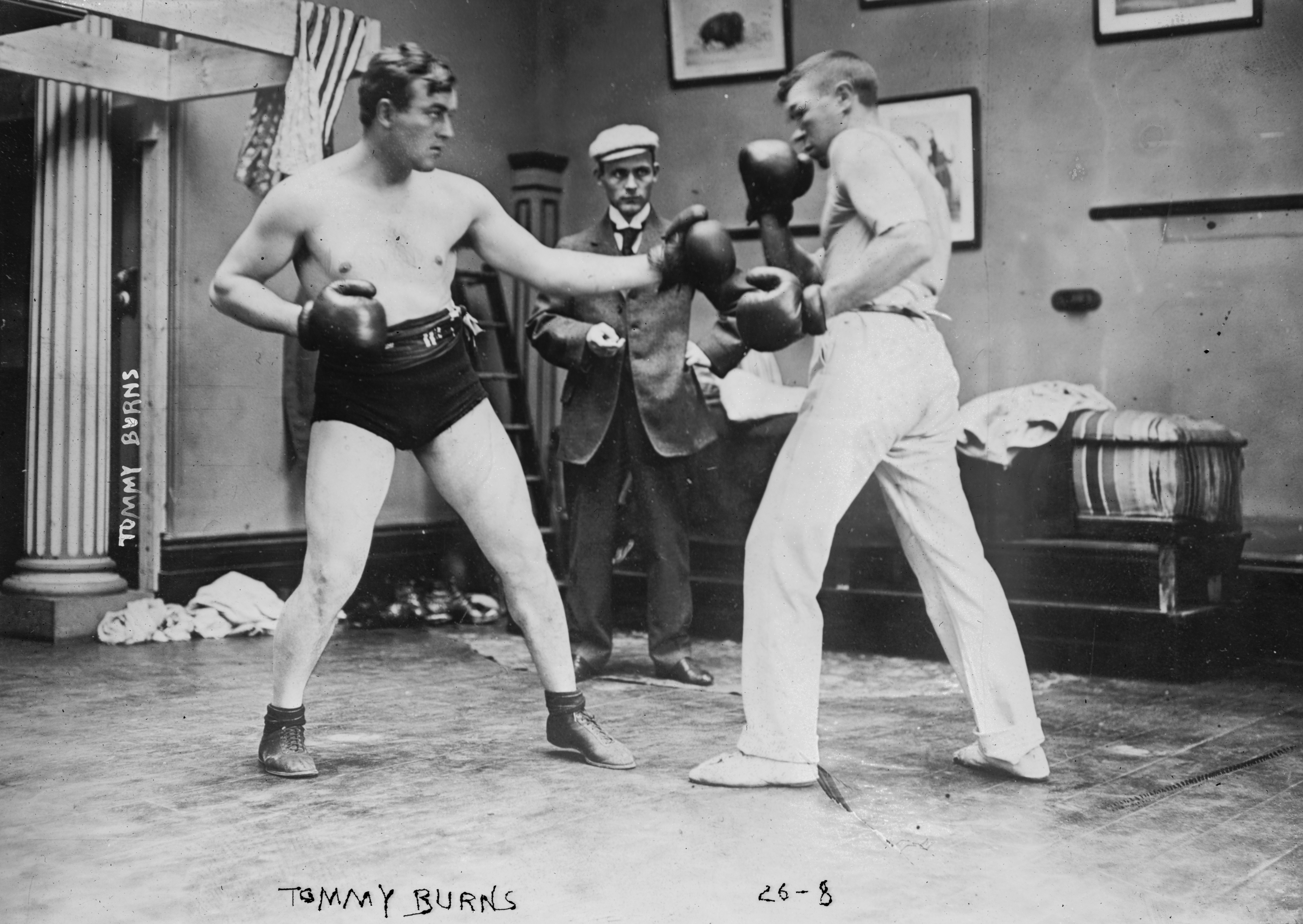
Tommy Burns during a sparring session.

Sparring is a form of training common to many combat sports. It can encompass a range of activities and techniques such as punching, kicking, grappling, throwing, wrestling or submission work dependent on style. Although the precise form varies, it is essentially relatively 'free-form' fighting, with enough rules, customs, or agreements to minimize injuries. By extension, argumentative debate is sometimes called sparring.

== Differences between styles ==
The physical nature of sparring naturally varies with the nature of the skills it is intended to develop; sparring in a striking art such as Karate will normally begin with the players at opposite sides of the mat and will be given a point for striking the appropriate area and will be given a foul for striking an inappropriate area or stepping out of the area. Sparring in a grappling art such as judo might begin with the partners holding one another and end if they separate.

The organization of sparring matches also varies; if the participants know each other well and are friendly, it may be sufficient for them to simply play, without rules, referee, or timer. If the sparring is between strangers, there is some emotional tension, or if the sparring is being evaluated, it may be appropriate to introduce formal rules and have an experienced martial artist supervise or referee the match.

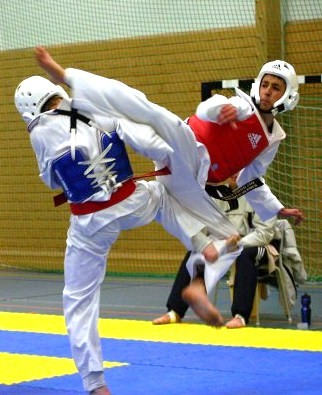
A WT taekwondo sparring match

In some schools, permission to begin sparring is granted upon entry. The rationale for this decision is that students must learn how to deal with a fast, powerful, and determined attacker. In other schools, students may be required to wait a few months, for safety reasons, because they must first build the skills they would ideally employ in their sparring practice.

Sparring is normally distinct from fights in competition, the goal of sparring normally being the education of the participants.

== Safety ==
In any sparring match, precautions are often taken to protect the participants. For Olympic-style taekwondo sparring, participants should wear chest protectors, headgear, shin protectors, instep protectors, forearm protectors, and mouthguards. They are also forbidden from having long fingernails, long untied hair, or eyeglasses.

Despite precautions, injuries are still common, especially to the head, face, or neck. One 2024 study found that mixed martial arts practitioners in Brazil who sparred at least twice a week had worse cognitive functioning.

== Brazilian Jiu Jitsu ==
Brazilian Jiu Jitsu sparring is full contact. It does not involve striking but rather forcing the opponent to submit using grappling techniques.

== MMA ==
There is much controversy in mixed martial arts about the benefits of full contact sparring vs career-threatening injuries. Former Ultimate Fighting Championship fighter Jamie Varner came to an early retirement because of head trauma from full contact sparring.

UFC former welterweight champions Robbie Lawler and Johny Hendricks do not do full contact sparring.

== Names and types ==
Sparring has different names and different forms in various schools. Some schools prefer not to call it sparring, as they feel it differs in kind from what is normally called sparring.

Brazilian Jiu-Jitsu practitioners 'Rolling'

- In Western fencing, including historical fencing, the combat is called in English "free play," "sparring," the "assault," or simply "fencing," depending on the form of fencing studied.
- In Brazilian Jiu-Jitsu sparring is commonly called rolling.
- In Capoeira, the closest analogue to sparring is jogo (playing in the roda).
- In Chinese martial arts, sparring is usually trained at first as individual applications, eventually combined as freestyle training of long, medium and short range techniques. See sanshou, pushing hands, chi sao.
- In many Japanese martial arts, a grappling-type sparring activity is usually called randori.
  - In judo, this is essentially one-on-one sparring.
  - In most forms of aikido, it is a formalized form of sparring where one aikidoka defends against many attackers.
- In Karate, sparring is called kumite (組手), see also randori.
- In Kūdō, it is called sparring
- In Taekwondo, sparring is called kyorugi by the World Taekwondo Federation (WTF) or matsogi by the International Taekwon-Do Federation (ITF).
  - In the WTF, the majority of the attacks executed are kicking techniques, whereas the ITF encourages the use of both hands and feet. The ITF does not always spar with head guards, but it is known to occur in some organizations practicing this form.
- In Silat, the act of sparring may either be referred to as berpencak or bersilat. Another form of competition is silat pulut in which the practitioners take turns reversing each other's moves.
- In the Indian martial art, Shastarvidya, sparring is done in the form of martial games called Sonchi. The level changes from indicating strikes, to touches and in advanced level, landing full contact blows. However, caution is always maintained in order to avoid any kind of injury or trauma.

== See also ==
- Aliveness (martial arts)
